= Ted (franchise) =

Film franchise article

- Official franchise logo
- Created by: Seth MacFarlane
- Original work: Ted (2012)
- Owner: Universal Pictures
- Years: 2012—present

Films and television
- Films: Ted (2012); Ted 2 (2015)
- Short film: Danganronpa/Ted: Bears Take Over Japan (2013)
- Television series: Ted (2024–2026)
- Animated series: Ted: The Animated Series (2026)

Audio
- Soundtrack: Ted

Ted (stylized in all lowercase) is an American fantasy comedy media franchise created by Seth MacFarlane and distributed by Universal Pictures. It centers around the eponymous teddy bear that magically comes to life, after the child he was gifted to wishes on a shooting star. Together, the pair form a friendship that lasts into their adulthood. The films star Seth MacFarlane and Mark Wahlberg as the two best friends, Ted and John Bennett, respectively, while the television series stars MacFarlane (reprising his role) with Max Burkholder as a younger John, alongside an ensemble cast of the wider Bennett family.

The first film in 2012 was met with generally positive critical reception, and was deemed a box office success based on a smaller production budget. The 2015 sequel was met with mixed critical reception, and while still a box office success, generated less income from ticket sales.

The franchise continued with a television series set prior to the events of the films. Its first season was released on Peacock in 2024, the second and final in 2026. MacFarlane reprised his role as the voice of Ted Clubber-Lang alongside a new ensemble cast, in addition to being credited in various creative roles for the series. Additionally, an animated series based on the films is scheduled to premiere on December 17 on Peacock, Jordan Kerridge and Bradley McSweeney also join the family in the latter stages. Gowdy Cameron Adam also joins the ragtag group in their quest for a good monday.

== Films ==
Film	U.S. release date	Director	Screenwriters	Story by	Producers
Ted	June 29, 2012	Seth MacFarlane	Alec Sulkin, Wellesley Wild & Seth MacFarlane	Seth MacFarlane	John Jacobs, Jason Clark, Scott Stuber & Seth MacFarlane
Ted 2	June 26, 2015	Seth MacFarlane	Alec Sulkin, Wellesley Wild & Seth MacFarlane	Alec Sulkin, Wellesley Wild & Seth MacFarlane	John Jacobs, Jason Clark, Scott Stuber & Seth MacFarlane

=== Ted (2012) ===
In 1985 Boston, a lonely, friendless child named John Bennett wishes that his Christmas gift jumbo teddy bear named Ted, would come to life and be his new best friend. As he makes his wish, a shooting star crosses the sky and his toy gains sentient intelligence. The pair quickly form a brother-like friendship and call themselves "Thunder Buddies". As the public becomes aware of the reality of Ted's life, he gains a brief celebrity status and fame. Twenty-seven years later, a now foul-mouthed, alcoholic Ted is still John's roommate and greatest friend. John's live-in girlfriend named Lori, grows tired of the constant presence of Ted, as the pair plan to start a family together. Though John wants to marry her, Lori is apprehensive while the best friends remain roommates. Ted attempts to regain control of his destiny and acquires a job at a local grocery store and begins dating his co-worker named Tami-Lynn. The tensions are amplified by John and Ted's regular consumption of beer and weed. Following a series of unfortunate circumstances instigated by Ted, Lori breaks up with John. As he blames Ted for the occurrence, Ted fights to right his wrongs to save his best friend's future. Ted may prove to be the one to give John the intervention he needs, to finally help each other grow up.

=== Ted 2 (2015) ===
Life has recently changed drastically for "Thunder Buddies", John and Ted. John is now a bachelor, after newly divorcing Lori, while Ted is a married man after wedding the woman of his dreams Tami-Lynn. When the newlyweds decide to adopt a child, legal problems arise when the state declares Ted as property and not a person. Scrambling for a resolution, the sentient teddy bear seeks for a lawyer to help him prove his ability to care for a child. Together, a young lawyer named Samantha "Sam" Jackson and an esteemed civil-rights attorney named Patrick Meighan, serve as legal counsel on the court case. In the process, the once-heartbroken John overcomes the tragedy of his failed marriage and becomes romantically involved with Sam. Combined in purpose, the group search for a way to salvage Ted and Tami-Lynn's plans for parenthood, and attaining the justice he deserves.

=== Future ===
In June 2015, Collider asked if the studio was already planning a third film; MacFarlane replied: "It's all based on appetite. If Ted 2 does as well as the first one, it means people want to see more of these characters. If that happens, then there would likely be a Ted 3. The franchise, to me, is one that's more character-based than premise-based. If you look at it like episodes in television, if you have characters that people like and they want to see them, again and again, you can tell any number of different stories. If there's a desire for it, then yeah, we would do a Ted 3."

On October 27, 2015, during an interview on Today MacFarlane, again, did not rule out the possibility of Ted 3, stating: "We don't know, I like to kind of have some space between Ted [films], so it's possible there will be another one but there are no immediate plans."

In January 2024, Seth MacFarlane explained that there had never really been any serious talks about doing a third Ted film, saying that he wasn't sure if there was still an insatiable appetite for more Ted.

== Short film (2013) ==
In 2013, to promote Ted in Japan, NBCUniversal Entertainment Japan teamed up with Spike Chunsoft in a short film marketing campaign involving Ted and the bear-antagonist Monokuma from Danganronpa, with Nobuyo Ōyama reprising her role as the latter. Titled Danganronpa/Ted: Bears Take Over Japan, the film follows Monokuma as he watches "Ted" while sitting at home on a sofa and eating popcorn. After remarking on what a "vulgar" movie it is, he nonetheless blushes in response to Ted and elects to "buy 3 Blu-ray discs: one for viewing, one for home use, and one for smashing!".

== Television series ==
Series overview
Series	Season	Episodes	Originally released	Network	Showrunners
Ted	1	7	January 11, 2024	Peacock	Seth MacFarlane, Paul Corrigan and Brad Walsh
Ted	2	8	March 5, 2026	Peacock	Seth MacFarlane, Paul Corrigan and Brad Walsh
Ted: The Animated Series	1	TBA	December 17, 2026	Peacock	Seth MacFarlane, Paul Corrigan and Brad Walsh

=== Ted (2024–2026) ===
In June 2021, it was announced that a television series centered around the titular character is in development and will be released as a Peacock exclusive. MacFarlane originally asked Mark Wahlberg to reprise his role as John, but due to being too occupied on other projects, the show became a prequel to the film series. MacFarlane served as a writer for the project in addition to serving as an executive producer with Erica Huggins.

In April 2022, as principal photography approached, it was revealed that the series plot will be set in 1993 in the years where the "Thunder Buddies", Ted and John, grew through the pains of adolescence as a family. Ted and John live in a working-class home in Boston with the latter's parents, Matty and Susan, and cousin named Blaire. While Ted isn't the best influence, the pair learn that their friendship can overcome anything. Max Burkholder was cast as a young John Bennett. Additionally, Scott Grimes, Alanna Ubach, and Giorgia Whigham will appear in supporting roles as Matty Bennett, Susan Bennet, and Blaire Bennett, respectively. MacFarlane will serve in various roles for the series, reprising his role as the voice of Ted from the films, which he developed from an idea that originated in a conversation he had with NBCUniversal content chairwoman Susan Rovner. MacFarlane will also serve as creator, showrunner, writer, and director on the 10-episode series. Paul Corrigan and Brad Walsh will serve as co-showrunners, additional screenwriters, and executive producers. Erica Huggins, Alana Kleiman, and Jason Clark also serve in executive producer roles for the series. The project will be a joint-venture production between Fuzzy Door Productions, Universal Content Productions, and MRC Television. The show was released as a Peacock Original Series. MacFarlane has stated that the tone of the show will be along the lines of the first movie, while stating that it's "a R-rated comedy".

Production was scheduled to begin in June 2022, with principal photography confirmed to have commenced by July of the same year. In May 2024, the series was renewed for a second season. In August 2024, it was reported by Puck that the second season was nearly cancelled due to high production costs around $8 million per episode, with Universal opting to continue the franchise with an animated series in addition. In January 2025, MacFarlane confirmed that the filming for the second season had wrapped. In March 2026, the second season was released on Peacock, with 8 episodes total. MacFarlane confirmed that there were no plans for a third season, citing the show's high production costs.

=== Ted: The Animated Series ===
In August 2024, it was announced that an animated series based on the franchise was in development. In January 2025, Mark Wahlberg joined the cast. In May 2025, the show was formally announced as Ted: The Animated Series and it was announced to be streaming on Peacock. Paul Corrigan and Brad Walsh were announced to be executive producers. An official teaser was released by Peacock on September 30, 2026 with the series set to premiere on December 17 of the same year.

== Cast and characters ==
List indicators

This section includes characters who will appear or have appeared in the franchise in noteworthy roles.

- An empty grey cell indicates the character was not in the film, or that the character's official presence has not yet been confirmed.
- ^{A} indicates an appearance through archival footage or audio.
- ^{C} indicates a cameo role.
- ^{P} indicates an appearance in onscreen photographs.
- ^{U} indicates an uncredited appearance.
- ^{V} indicates a voice-only role.
- ^{Y} indicates a younger version of the character.

Character	Film series		Television series	
Character	Ted	Ted 2	Ted	Ted: The Animated Series
Theodore "Ted" Clubber-Lang (née Bennett)	Seth MacFarlane^{V} Zane Cowans^{V}^{Y} Tara Strong^{V}^{U}	Seth MacFarlane^{V} Tara Strong^{V}	Seth MacFarlane^{V} Tara Strong^{V}^{U}	Seth MacFarlane^{V} Tara Strong^{V}
John "Johnny" Bennett	Mark Wahlberg Colton Shires^{Y} Bretton Manley^{Y}	Mark Wahlberg	Max Burkholder Colton Shires^{Y}^{A}	Mark Wahlberg^{V}
Tami-Lynn Clubber-Lang (née McCafferty)	Jessica Barth	Jessica Barth		Jessica Barth^{V}
Donny	Giovanni Ribisi	Giovanni Ribisi		
Frank Stevens	Bill Smitrovich	Bill Smitrovich		
Guy	Patrick Warburton	Patrick Warburton		
Sam J. Jones	Himself	Himself	Himself^{P}	TBA
Lori Collins	Mila Kunis			
Rex	Joel McHale			
Robert	Aedin Mincks Taylor Lautner^{P}			
Thomas Murphy	Matt Walsh			
Steve / Matty Bennett	Ralph Garman		Scott Grimes	TBA
Helen / Susan Bennett	Alex Borstein		Alanna Ubach	TBA
Jared	Ryan Reynolds^{U}			
Samantha "Sam" Jackson		Amanda Seyfried		Amanda Seyfried^{V}
Mr. Tom Jessup		John Carroll Lynch		
Patrick Meighan		Morgan Freeman		
Shep Wild		John Slattery		
Rick		Michael Dorn		
KITT		Seth MacFarlane^{V}^{U}	William Daniels^{V}^{A}	
Apollo Creed Clubber-Lang		Uncredited infant actor		Kyle Mooney^{V}
Blaire Bennett			Giorgia Whigham	
Andrew			Ara Hollyday	
Polly			Liz Richman	
Sarah			Marissa Shankar	
Erin			Francesca Xuereb	
Sheila Borgwort			Charly Jordan	
Clive			Jack Seavor McDonald	
Principal Bernard			Penny Johnson Jerald	
Mrs. Gert Fetchco			Gail Goldberg	
Bert			Don Lake	
Ruth				Liz Richman^{V}
Mikey Clubber-Lang				Tara Strong^{V}

== Additional crew and production details ==
Film	Crew/Detail					
Film	Composer	Cinematographer	Editor(s)	Production companies	Distributing company	Running time
Ted	Walter Murphy	Michael Barrett	Jeff Freeman	Bluegrass Films; Universal Pictures; Smart Entertainment; Media Rights Capital; Fuzzy Door Productions	Universal Pictures	106 min
Ted 2	Walter Murphy	Michael Barrett	Jeff Freeman	Bluegrass Films; Universal Pictures; Media Rights Capital; Fuzzy Door Productions	Universal Pictures	115 min
Ted (TV series)	Walter Murphy	Jeffrey C. Mygatt	Tom Costantino	MRC Television; Universal Television; Fuzzy Door Productions; Peacock Original Series; Universal Content Productions	Peacock	34-51 per episode

== Reception ==
=== Box office and financial performance ===
Film	Box office gross			Box office ranking		Home video sales gross	Total gross income	Budget	Ref.
Film	North America	Other territories	Worldwide	All-time North America	All-time worldwide	North America	Total gross income	Budget	Ref.
Ted	$218,815,487	$330,552,828	$549,368,315	#171	#209	$132,162,871	$688,179,498	$50,000,000	
Ted 2	$81,476,385	$134,387,221	$215,863,606	#972	#689	$25,210,774	$242,424,917	$68,000,000	
Totals	$300,291,872	$464,940,049	$765,231,921	x̄ #572	x̄ #449	$157,373,645	$930,604,415	$118,000,000	

=== Critical and public response ===
Film	Rotten Tomatoes	Metacritic	CinemaScore
Ted	68% (223 reviews)	62/100 (37 reviews)	A−
Ted 2	45% (208 reviews)	48/100 (38 reviews)	B+
Ted (TV series)	73% (37 reviews)	51/100 (18 reviews)	—
