= Ted (soundtrack) =

Ted (Original Motion Picture Soundtrack)

Soundtrack album by Walter Murphy and various artists
- Released: June 26, 2012
- Studio: Newman Scoring Stage, 20th Century Fox
- Genre: Film soundtrack
- Length: 56:34
- Label: Universal Republic
- Producer: Walter Murphy; Seth MacFarlane; Leslie Lewis; Vanessa Curwen (asst.)

Walter Murphy chronology
Family Guy: Live in Vegas (2005)	Ted (Original Motion Picture Soundtrack) (2012)	Ted 2 (Original Motion Picture Soundtrack) (2015)

Ted (Original Motion Picture Soundtrack) is the soundtrack to the 2012 film Ted directed by Seth MacFarlane. The soundtrack featured musical score composed by Walter Murphy and songs from Queen, Hootie & The Blowfish, Rita Coolidge, Tiffany amongst others; an original song "Everybody Needs a Best Friend" written by MacFarlane and Murphy and performed by Norah Jones, which was later nominated for an Academy Award for Best Original Song. The soundtrack was released through Universal Republic Records on June 26, 2012, three days ahead of the film's release.

== Background ==
Walter Murphy was roped in to compose the film's musical score as he previously did the same for MacFarlane's animated television series: Family Guy, American Dad! and The Cleveland Show. When MacFarlane sent the script to Murphy, he mentioned that he wanted an old school orchestral score that would have themes for the individual characters and a main title song which he could quote throughout the film, that eventually became the song "Everybody Needs a Best Friend".

MacFarlane sent different sets of lyrics than the one he used for the actual song, and he wrote the theme based on it. But he rewrote them so as the song being sung from the standpoint of Ted, and also felt it funnier if a woman sung it track. MacFarlane then discussed it to singer Norah Jones who agreed to perform it, and Murphy arranged in the style of Nelson Riddle's work. According to Murphy, "It's not only well sung, but Norah's attitude also just fit the main title section perfectly."

The score was recorded at the Newman Scoring Stage in the 20th Century Fox Studios with an 80-piece string orchestra conducted by John Elg. Besides the accompanying music, the album featured songs from Queen, Hootie & The Blowfish, Rita Coolidge, Tiffany and more musical numbers that were not in the album, but in the film. Universal Republic Records released the soundtrack on June 26, 2012.

== Reception ==
Heather Phares of AllMusic wrote "Witty and distinctively MacFarlane, the soundtrack shows he can translate his musical ideas, as well as his comedy, to the big screen." Daniel Schweiger of Assignment X wrote "Walter Murphy hits all the right Williams and Mancini notes for a foul-mouthed Teddy Bear".

== Track listing ==
All tracks are written by Walter Murphy, except where indicated.

No.	Title	Writer(s)	Performer(s)	Length
1.	"Everybody Needs a Best Friend"	Seth MacFarlane and Walter Murphy	Norah Jones	2:28
2.	"The Power of Wishes"	Walter Murphy		3:11
3.	"Thunder Buddies for Life"			1:56
4.	"John & Lori at Work / A Walk in the Park"			1:36
5.	"Magical Wish"			0:51
6.	"Rex's Party (Everybody Needs a Best Friend)"			2:30
7.	"The Breakup"			1:01
8.	"Never be Scared of Thunder Again"			1:06
9.	"Ted is Captured"			3:48
10.	"The Car Chase / Fenway Pursuit"			3:27
11.	"Climbing the Tower / She's Your Thunder Buddy Now"			3:59
12.	"Saving Ted / Lori's Wish"			3:39
13.	"The Proposal / The Wedding"			2:56
14.	"End Titles"			5:14
15.	"Flash's Theme"	Brian May	Queen	2:31
16.	"Sin"	Mike Burdge, Scott Garapolo and Tim Mercer	Daphne	2:23
17.	"Only Wanna Be with You"	Mark Bryan, Everett Felber, Darius Rucker and James Sonfeld	Hootie & The Blowfish	3:48
18.	"Come Away with Me"	Norah Jones	Norah Jones	3:07
19.	"All Time High"	John Barry	Rita Coolidge	3:03
20.	"I Think We're Alone Now"	Ritchie Cordell	Tiffany	3:46
21.	"Thunder Buddies for Life"	Walter Murphy	Seth MacFarlane and Mark Wahlberg	0:14
Total length:				56:34

== Original score ==
The complete score was released by Universal Pictures as a part of their For Your Consideration (FYC) campaign for the 2012–13 film awards season.

No.	Title	Length
1.	"The Power of Wishes"	1:28
2.	"Meet John"	0:39
3.	"Christmas Morning"	1:17
4.	"Now, If There's One Thing..."	0:58
5.	"Suprise! A Talking Teddy Bear"	1:00
6.	"His Wish Came True"	0:25
7.	"In the Tent"	1:05
8.	"Driving to Work"	0:26
9.	"Lori Walks into Work"	0:29
10.	"At the Aquarium"	0:23
11.	"Snuggle's Accountant"	0:37
12.	"At the Commons"	0:52
13.	"Moving In"	1:19
14.	"Magic Wish"	0:52
15.	"Ted and Creepy Donny"	0:18
16.	"Death to Ming"	0:15
17.	"Ted Alone"	1:04
18.	"Never Be Scared of Thunder Again"	1:05
19.	"Donny at the Door"	0:12
20.	"Teddy the Hostage"	0:35
21.	"Welcome Home"	0:45
22.	"In Robert's Creepy Room"	1:12
23.	"Robert Does The Van Gogh"	0:29
24.	"Playtime"	1:03
25.	"Ted Sees Door"	0:08
26.	"Staples"	0:27
27.	"Creeping Around"	0:18
28.	"Donny in the Doorway"	0:10
29.	"Urgent Phone Call"	0:37
30.	"Kidnapped Ted"	0:34
31.	"Car Jump"	1:05
32.	"The Chase"	0:51
33.	"After the Crash"	0:28
34.	"They Make a Run for It"	0:30
35.	"Run Up to Punch"	0:26
36.	"Run into Stadium"	0:30
37.	"Climbing Up"	0:29
38.	"Hanging Off the Scoreboard"	0:30
39.	"John Runs After Him / Ted Falls"	0:49
40.	"Teddy on the Ground"	0:44
41.	"She's Your Thunderbuddy Now"	1:23
42.	"Rainy Drive-Life Support"	1:41
43.	"You Did All You Could / Lori's Secret Wish"	2:05
44.	"Teddy's Eyes Open"	0:09
45.	"The Proposal / Wedding Bells"	2:52

== Personnel ==
Credits adapted from liner notes

- Music Composer and Arranger – Walter Murphy
- Producer – Walter Murphy, Leslie Lewis
- Assistant Producer – Vanessa Curwen
- Executive Producer – Seth MacFarlane
- Orchestrator - Todd Sheidenberger
- Orchestra Conductor – John Elg
- Concertmaster – Joel Derouin
- Music Contractor - Murray Adler
- Music Editors – Moira Marquis, Stan Jones
- Music Scoring Mixer – Armin Steiner
- Recordist – Christine Sirois
- Pro Tools Operator - Steve Hallmark
- Pre-Record Engineer – Richie Raposa
- Mastering – Chris Bellman

Instruments

- Bass – Chuck Berghofer, Dave Stone, Dominic Genova, Ken Wild, Richard Shaw, Steven Edelman*, Trey Henry
- Bassoon – Rose Corrigan
- Cello – Cecilia Tsan, Dennis Karmazyn, Earl Madison, Jen Kuhn, Jerome Kessler, Maryanne Steinberger, Matthew Cooker, Maurice Grants, Miguel Martinez, Nancy Stein-Ross, Vanessa Freebairn-Smith
- Clarinet – Gary Bovyer
- Drums – Bernie Dresel
- French horn – James Thatcher, Joe Meyer, Justin Hageman, Tawnee Lillo, William Lane
- Guitar – Thom Rotella
- Harp – Katie Kirkpatrick, Marcia Dickstein
- Percussion – Bob Leatherbarrow, Brian Kilgore, David G. Shank, Greg Westhoff
- Piano – David Loeb, Tom Ranier
- Trombone – Alex Iles, Alex Kaplan, Ira Nepus, Bill Reichenbach, John Van Houten
- Trumpet – Chuck Findley, Gary Grant, Jon Lewis, Larry Hall, Rick Baptist, Rob Schaer
- Tuba – Bill Reichenbach, John Van Houten
- Viola – Andrew Duckles, Dan Neufeld, Darrin McCann, Denyse Buffum, Harry Shirinian, Jimbo Ross, Jorge Moraga, Lynn Grants, Michael Nowak, Michelle Jiao Liu, Ray Tischer, Robert Berg, Victor De Almeida
- Violin – Ana Landauer, Bob Peterson, Cameron Patrick, Charlie Bisharat, Cheryl Norman, Chris Reutinger, Christine Frank, Daphne Chen, Franklyn D'Antonio, Gil Romero, Helen Nightengale, Isabelle Senger, Jeremy Cohen, John Wittenberg, Kathleen Robertson, Kenneth Yerke, Kevin Connolly, Lorenz Gamma, Marcy Dicterow Vaj, Marina Manukian, Mark Baranov, Mark Robertson, Michele Richards, Miran Kojian, Nancy Roth, Ovsep Ketendjian, Phillip Levy, Razdan Kuyumjian, Serena McKinney, Sharon Cooper, Songa Lee
- Woodwind – Alan Estes, Bob Carr, Chris Bleth, Dan Higgins, Fred Selden, Jennifer Hall, John Yoakum, Steve Kujala

== Accolades ==
List of awards and nominations
Award / Film Festival	Category	Recipients	Result	Ref.
International Film Music Critics Association Award (2012)	Best Original Score for a Comedy Film	Walter Murphy	Won	
Georgia Film Critics Association Award (2013)	Best Original Song	"Everybody Needs a Best Friend" — Seth MacFarlane and Walter Murphy	Nominated	
Academy Award (85th)	Best Original Song	"Everybody Needs a Best Friend" — Seth MacFarlane and Walter Murphy	Nominated	
