= Bone Symphony (EP) =

Bone Symphony EP

EP by Bone Symphony
- Released: 1983
- Studio: Westlake Audio; The Lighthouse
- Genre: Synthpop, new wave
- Length: 21:04
- Label: Capitol
- Producer: Brian Fairweather, Martin Page

Singles from Bone Symphony EP
- 1. "It's a Jungle Out There"

Bone Symphony EP is an EP by Bone Symphony released in 1983. It was their only commercial release. The release spawned a successful dance hit in Europe with the single "It's a Jungle Out There".

The album lost the punchy techno-garage sound found in the group's live performances in Hollywood – the production was smoother, fatter and more commercial. This was due largely to the replacement of the original Roland 808 and Linn drum machines by drummer Robert Williams. The single "It's a Jungle Out There" received a music video which was played on MTV and would later be played on MTV2. The single peaked at No. 62 on the Dance Club Songs chart.

== Reception ==
The EP was given a positive review stating "The catchy pop hooks of the opening 'It's A Jungle Out There' – certain to be a hit – gives way to more serious work in Wilk's 'I'll Be There For You,' after the quixotic 'Everything I Say is a Lie,'... All three had a hand in composing the two tunes on side two, the slightly pompous 'Piece of My Heart' whose music and lyrics don't seem to match very well, and he heightened pop consciousness of 'Dome of the Spheres.' While the album is not perfect, it shows some very exciting potential in very substantial present work. The album's most commercial cut is the opening 'It's a Jungle Out There' which has a different producer – and feel – than the rest of the album. It's more appealing, but less cerebral than the rest of the album, just as it was intended."

Another review stated: "Its sound is high-tech, pulsing and snappy, notably in 'It's a Jungle Out There.' The group is heavy on repetitious rhythms and light on substance, despite its claims otherwise." As well as rating it 2½ stars.

== Track listing ==
1. "It's A Jungle Out There" – 4:55
2. "Everything I Say Is A Lie" – 3:52
3. "I'll Be There For You" – 3:54
4. "Piece Of My Heart" – 4:10
5. "Dome Of The Spheres" – 5:33

== Personnel ==
- Lead vocals, backing vocals, keyboards, synthesizer, drum programming – Scott Wilk
- Synthesizer, Bass synthesizer, guitar, drum programming, backing vocals, sequencers – Marc Levinthal
- Keyboards, synthesizer – Jacob Magnússon
