= Big Apple Band =

Big Apple Band may refer to:

- Walter Murphy, whose "A Fifth of Beethoven" was credited to Walter Murphy & The Big Apple Band
- Chic (band), which changed its name from The Big Apple Band after Murphy's single
