= Livin' on a Prayer (Family Guy) =

- Family Guy episode
- Episode no.: Season 10; Episode 12
- Directed by: Pete Michels
- Written by: Danny Smith
- Production code: 9ACX09
- Original air date: January 29, 2012

Guest appearances
- Max Burkholder as Scotty Jennings; Gary Cole; Rob Corddry as Ben Jennings; Judy Greer as Hope Jennings; Jonathan Morgan Heit as Kid 1; Kevin Michael Richardson as Tyrone; Sage Ryan as Kid 2; Tara Strong as Kid 3; Nicole Sullivan as Louise Sawyer; Josh Robert Thompson

Episode chronology
| ← Previous "The Blind Side" | Next → "Tom Tucker: The Man and His Dream" |
- Family Guy season 10

"Livin' on a Prayer" is the twelfth episode of the tenth season of the animated comedy series Family Guy, and the 177th episode overall. The episode originally aired on Fox in the United States on January 29, 2012. In this episode, Stewie befriends another boy named Scotty. When Scotty falls ill, Peter and Lois take him to the hospital. His parents disagree with this action, due to their religious beliefs.

The episode was well received by critics for its cutaway gags, cultural references, and themes. This episode was written by Danny Smith and directed by Pete Michels. The episode features guest performances by Max Burkholder, Gary Cole, Rob Corddry, Judy Greer, Jonathan Morgan Heit, Kevin Michael Richardson, Sage Ryan, Tara Strong, Nicole Sullivan, and Josh Robert Thompson along with several recurring voice actors for the series. This episode was named after the Bon Jovi song of the same name.

== Plot ==
The Griffin family goes to the Quahog Public Library for the Children's Sing-a-long activity held by Bruce. While there, Stewie meets a boy named Scotty Jennings and his parents Ben and Hope, whom Lois and Peter befriend. Both Lois and Hope organize a play date for both their sons. Everything goes well until Scotty suddenly falls ill whilst playing with Stewie and passes out, so Lois and Peter rush him to the hospital.

At the hospital, Dr. Hartman tells them that Scotty has Hodgkin's disease and needs urgent treatment or else he will die. When Scotty's parents Ben and Hope arrive, they confess that they already knew their son had cancer, but do not use modern hospital treatment due to their religious beliefs as Christian Scientists, stating that they use their faith as a medicine. Lois, with her contrasting religious beliefs, tries to convince them to let Scotty receive medical treatment. However, Ben and Hope remain hopeful that continuous prayers will save their son. Lois then seeks help from Joe, but he says the police are unable to intervene, as it would be a violation of Hope and Ben's right to practice their religion.

As a last resort, Lois decides to take matters into her own hands by kidnapping Scotty and taking him to the hospital herself. Lois and Peter sneak up to the Jennings' house and get Scotty out successfully after Peter almost abducted Ben. While Lois and Peter are taking Scotty to the hospital, a news report by Tom Tucker reports on the abduction where Tricia Takanawa is speaking to Mayor Adam West about how to handle the recent kidnapping.

Lois and Peter's plans are thrown into turmoil when news spreads of their kidnapping and a huge mob with Tricia and her cameraman (along with her super protective painter boyfriend, Tyrone) and the police with Joe stop them at the hospital. Ben and Hope arrive and plead with Lois to return Scotty to them, but Lois counters by explaining that mankind has created modern medicine, which can be viewed as the product of God answering their prayers. She then states that if they want help from God, they should stop disregarding this fact and do the right thing for Scotty. Eventually, Ben and Hope agree and allow their son to go to the hospital to receive his treatments, prompting Peter to exclaim "Hey Everybody, We're All Gonna Get Laid!"

Scotty ends up beating his cancer, but by this point, Stewie has found a new friend with leprosy. At the end of the show, Peter decides to study Christian Science and proves a theory by imagining himself as Duchess Kate Middleton at the Royal Wedding. While there, he asks Prince William when he thinks the Queen will die.

== Reception ==
The episode received very positive reviews. Kevin McFarland of The A.V. Club, a considerable critic of post-cancellation seasons of the show, gave the episode a B−, appreciating how it tackled religion in comparison to previous episodes, and enjoying several of the cutaway and filler gags, such as Mayor West claiming to be John Mayer. He disliked a joke about Count Dracula nearly catching HIV in San Francisco, however as he felt it was homophobic. A review by Kate Moon of TV Fanatic was even more overwhelmingly positive, claiming that the show delivered a "genuine message". She gave a 4.3/5 rating. Both reviews were favorable towards the opening credits.

In its original broadcast on January 29, 2012, "Livin' on a Prayer" was watched by 5.92 million U.S. viewers and acquired a 3.1/7 rating in the 18–49 demographic.
