= Amick Byram =

- Born: January 24, 1955 (age 71); McLennan County, Texas, United States
- Origin: Los Angeles, California, United States
- Genres: Musical theatre, Christian music
- Occupation: Singer
- Instrument: Vocals
- Website: www.amickbyram.com

David Amick Byram (born January 24, 1955) is an American singer and two-time Grammy nominee. Byram is the co-founder and producing director of the American Coast Theater Company.

A native of McLennan County, Texas, Byram is a well-known session artist in Los Angeles, California. He is best known for providing the singing voice of Moses in The Prince of Egypt. He also contributed to the films Shrek, Aladdin, Beauty and the Beast, The Lion King, Pocahontas, Hercules, Mulan, Pocahontas II: Journey to a New World, The Road to El Dorado, and The Matrix.

Byram has acted in numerous professional stage productions, including The Phantom of the Opera on Broadway and in Los Angeles; Les Misérables as Joly and an understudy for Enjolras; Sunset Boulevard as Joe Gillis (playing opposite Glenn Close); and Jesus in Jesus Christ Superstar. He played Sir Archibald Proops in the 1994 recording of Jekyll & Hyde.

On television he played Ian Andrew Troi, the father of Counselor Troi in Star Trek: The Next Generation, and has appeared in The Simpsons and Quincy, M.E.. Around 2015 to 2016, he guested on Hour of Power with Bobby Schuller.

He is a 1977 graduate of Oral Roberts University, and was named ORU's 2014 Alumnus of the Year.

He is married to actress and singer Cassandra Byram and is the brother of gospel singer Danny Byram.

== Filmography ==
=== Films ===
Year	Title	Role	Notes
1989	Little Nemo: Adventures in Slumberland	Singer	Voice
1994	The Swan Princess	Chorus (singing voice)	Voice
1997	A Christmas Carol	Additional voices	Direct-to-video; Voice
1998	An All Dogs Christmas Carol	Additional voices	Voice
1998	The Prince of Egypt	Moses (singing voice)	Voice
2000	Lion of Oz	Singer	Direct-to-video; Voice
2002	Mickey's House of Villains	Chorus (singing voice)	Direct-to-video; Voice
2005	West Bank Story	David (singing voice)	Short; Voice
2014	A Million Ways to Die in the West	Marcus Thornton	
2017	Olaf's Frozen Adventure	Additional voices	Short; Voice

=== Television ===
Year	Title	Role	Notes
1983	Quincy, M.E.	Richard	1 episode
1988	Superior Court	Darrell Guillary	1 episode
1990	Jake and the Fatman	Morrison	1 episode
1991-1993	Star Trek: The Next Generation	Hickman; Commander Ian Andrew Troi	2 episodes
1996	Saved by the Bell: The New Class	Sponsor #1	1 episode
2006	The Simpsons	Additional vocals	1 episode
2013	Today	Himself	Guest; 1 episode
2017	All Hail King Julien: Exiled	Vocalist	3 episodes
2019	American Dad!	Soup Jingle Singer	1 episode
