= Jessica Barth =

American stage and film actress

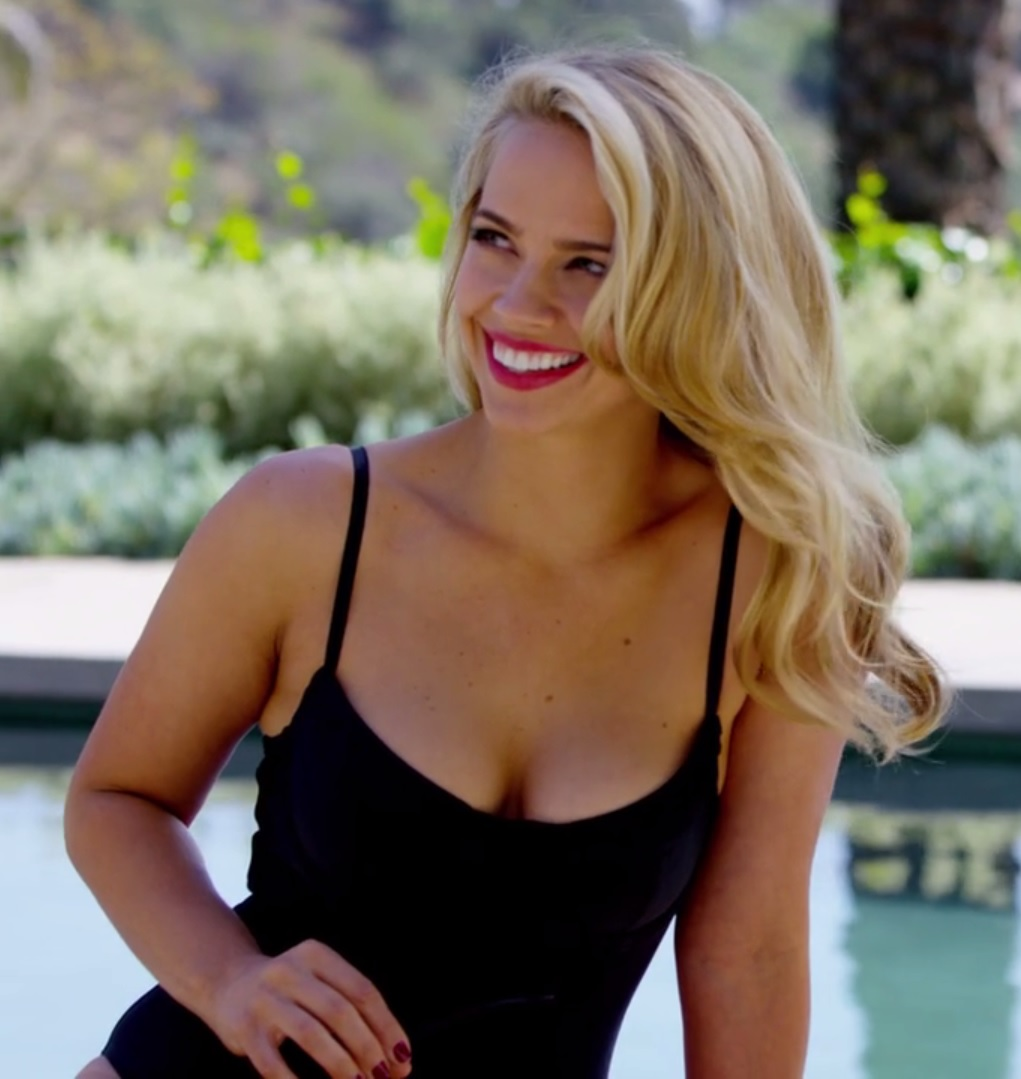
- Barth in 2015
- Education: West Chester University (BA)
- Occupation: Actress
- Years active: 2003–present
- Known for: Ted

Jessica Barth is an American actress. She is best known for portraying Tami-Lynn in the Ted franchise.

== Education ==
After high school, she took classes at the Wilma Theater, and later attended La Salle University, where she studied communications for two years; she also attended the Vassar Powerhouse Theater Program in collaboration with New York Stage & Film. She later earned a Bachelor of Arts at West Chester University, where she studied theatre and creative writing.

== Career ==
Barth built up her résumé while also working at three different restaurants in Los Angeles. She began her acting career with theater plays, with her first television role on The District in 2004 and her first film role in Neo Ned in 2005. Barth earned worldwide recognition with her appearance in Seth MacFarlane's 2012 film Ted as Tami-Lynn, the title character's love interest. She reprised the role in Ted 2 (2015) and Ted: The Animated Series (2026–present).

In 2012, Barth accused her manager David Guillod of drugging and sexually assaulting her. She re-stated the accusation in 2017. In June 2020, Guillod was charged with 11 felony counts of sex-related crimes, including kidnapping and rape, stemming from accusations made by other women.

In 2017, Barth revealed that she was a victim of sexual harassment from Harvey Weinstein. She met with Weinstein in his hotel suite for a presumed business meeting where he "alternated between offering to cast her in a film and demanding a naked massage in bed." Seth MacFarlane stated his support for her allegations in a statement on Twitter.

== Filmography ==
=== Film ===
Year	Title	Role	Notes
2005	Neo Ned	Production Assistant	
2005	Deserted		Short film
2007	Next	Pretty Blonde	
2007	Mr. Blue Sky	Sherry	
2008	Get Smart	Flight Attendant	
2009	Portal	Kim	Direct-to-video
2009	The Waterhole	Sarah	
2012	Ted	Tami-Lynn McCafferty	
2015	Ted 2	Tami-Lynn McCafferty	
2018	Along Came the Devil	Tanya Winbourne	

=== Television ===
Year	Title	Role	Notes
2004	The District	Laurel Bettis	Episode: "Breath of Life"
2005	The Catch	Rachel	Television film
2005	One on One	Attractive Woman	Episode: "Money's Tight and So Are My Abs"
2006	South of Nowhere	Nicole	Episode: "Rules of Engagement"
2007	How I Met Your Mother	Church Girl	Episode: "Moving Day"
2007	Days of Our Lives	Lindy Elroy	1 episode
2012	Family Guy	Sookie Stackhouse (voice)	Episode: "The Blind Side"
2008	CSI: Crime Scene Investigation	Justine Stefani	Episode: "Leave Out All the Rest"
2010	Cougar Town	Sandy / Brandy	Episode: "All the Wrong Reasons"
2012	Parks and Recreation	Katherine	Episode: "Pawnee Commons"
2018	A Stolen Life	Tamara Thompson	Television film
2026	Ted: The Animated Series	Tami-Lynn (voice)	Main role
