= Family Guy: Live in Vegas =

Soundtrack album by Walter Murphy and His Orchestra
- Released: April 26, 2005
- Recorded: 1999–2005
- Genres: Comedy jazz, soundtrack
- Length: 67:53
- Label: Geffen
- Producers: Seth MacFarlane; Walter Murphy

Walter Murphy chronology
Themes from E.T. the Extra-Terrestrial and More (1982)	Family Guy: Live in Vegas (2005)	Ted (Original Motion Picture Soundtrack) (2012)

Family Guy: Live in Vegas is a soundtrack album for the American animated television series Family Guy, released on April 26, 2005 by Geffen Records. Composed by Walter Murphy and creator Seth MacFarlane, the album features vocals from cast regulars Seth MacFarlane, Alex Borstein, Seth Green, Mike Henry, Mila Kunis, Adam West and Lori Alan, alongside guest stars Haylie Duff, Patti LuPone, and Jason Alexander. It includes an extended version of the series' theme song; the remaining tracks were composed exclusively for the album, with Rat Pack- and Broadway-inspired songs, including reworked versions of pop standards "The Last Time I Saw Paris", "Slightly Out of Tune", and "One Boy".

The CD is accompanied by a DVD featuring the music video for Stewie's "Sexy Party" as well as featurettes. It was nominated for the Grammy Award for Best Comedy Album at the 48th Grammy Awards, but it lost to Chris Rock's Never Scared.

== Background ==
Seth MacFarlane described the album as "a blend of the rich, lush arrangements of the classic era of Rat Pack Vegas shows combined with the fart jokes of today". MacFarlane co-produced the album and co-wrote several tracks. It features guest stars Jason Alexander, Patti LuPone and Haylie Duff. The album includes a cover of "The Last Time I Saw Paris" by Jerome Kern as well as a medley of theme songs from 1980s shows such as Diff'rent Strokes, Who's the Boss, Growing Pains and Charles in Charge. The album is arranged and orchestrated by Walter Murphy and all songs are produced by MacFarlane and Murphy.

All the voice actors from the show appear on the album voicing their characters. The album includes a DVD with the music video of Stewie's "Sexy Party" and behind the scenes segments on making the album and the video. The DVD also includes a trailer for American Dad! and the fourth season of Family Guy.

== Track listing ==
All tracks are written by Seth MacFarlane and Walter Murphy, except where noted.

CD
No.	Title	Writer(s)	Performer(s)	Length
1.	"Fanfare & Intro"	Murphy; Ron Jones	Tom Tucker and Diane Simmons	1:11
2.	"Theme from Family Guy"		Peter, Lois, Meg, Chris, Stewie and Brian Griffin	7:08
3.	"Babysitting Is a Bum Deal"		Stewie and Haylie Duff	3:51
4.	"Dear Booze"		Brian	4:43
5.	"The "Q" Man Loves Nobody" (based on "How Could You Believe Me When I Said I Love You, When you Know I've Been a Liar All My Life?" from Royal Wedding)		Glenn Quagmire and Patti LuPone	4:15
6.	"All Cartoons Are Fuckin' Dicks"		Peter, Lois, Meg, Chris, Stewie, Brian and Jason Alexander	6:59
7.	"The Last Time I Saw Paris" (from Lady Be Good)	Jerome Kern; Oscar Hammerstein II; MacFarlane (Note: Additional lyrics)	Brian	5:41
8.	"But Then I Met You"		Peter and Lois	4:01
9.	"T.V. Medley" (Diff'rent Strokes, Growing Pains, Charles in Charge, Silver Spoons, Who's the Boss?, Perfect Strangers, The Golden Girls and Family Ties)	Al Burton; Gloria Loring; Alan Thicke; John Bettis; Steve Dorff; David Kurtz; Michael Jacobs; Ray Colcord; Larry Carlton; Robert Kraft; Martin Cohan; Blake Hunter; David Pomeranz; Andrew Gold; Pat Valentino	Brian and Stewie	9:33
10.	"Puberty's Gonna Get Me"		Chris	4:29
11.	"But I'm Yours"		Peter and Lois	3:56
12.	"Slightly Out of Tune"	Antônio Carlos Jobim; Newton Mendonça	Brian	3:57
13.	"One Boy" (from Bye Bye Birdie)	Charles Strouse; Lee Adams	Herbert	2:01
14.	"Quahog Holiday"		Peter, Lois, Meg, Chris, Stewie, Brian, Cleveland Brown, Quagmire and Adam West	5:01
15.	"Bow Music (Theme from Family Guy)"		Peter, Lois, Stewie and Brian	0:46
Total length:				67:53

DVD
No.	Title	Length
1.	"Stewie's Sexy Party"	3:15
2.	"The Making of Family Guy: Live in Vegas"	4:07
3.	"The Making of Sexy Party"	9:46
4.	"Family Guy and American Dad! Trailer"	0:59

== Reception ==
Professional ratings
Review scores
Source	Rating
AllMusic	4.5/5 stars
IGN	(6.9/10)
Soundtrack.Net	3.5/5 stars

The album received positive reviews from music sources and critics. Rob Theakston of AllMusic said that "[Family Guy is] back and raunchier than ever, sparing no expense and leaving no pop culture stone unturned" and "without the constraints of network censors, the profanity and heat are turned up to the max". He called the Broadway-inspired music "brilliant yet jarring juxtaposition of raunch and class". The DVD was called a "must-have for any fan of the show". Tina Huang of Soundtrack.Net said that the album "wonderfully merges the flair of big-band orchestras, with simulated, on-stage, Rat Pack-like performances, a chorus, and convincing live audience" and called it "mainly for fans; it can't be argued that the music is no less than impressive, but the messages may offend".

== Charts ==
Chart	Peak position
U.S. Billboard 200	105
U.S. Billboard Top Comedy Albums	2
