= Bone Symphony =

1980s band

- Origin: Los Angeles, California, U.S.
- Genres: Synthpop, new wave
- Years active: 1982–1984
- Label: Capitol
- Past members: Scott Wilk; Marc Levinthal; Jacob Magnusson

Bone Symphony was an American synthpop / new wave active in the early 1980s. The group consisted of Scott Wilk on lead vocals and synthesizer, Marc Levinthal (guitar, bass synthesizer and sequencer, drum machine, 808 programming) and keyboard artist Jacob Magnusson. All band members played synthesizer keyboards. They were signed to Capitol Records and released only one record, Bone Symphony EP, in 1983.

They are most famous for their song "One Foot in Front of the Other" which appeared in the films Revenge of the NerdsQuigley, Mike. "Lost in the '80s: Revenge of the Nerds". Popdose. and Ted 2, an episode of Family Guy, Good Girls and New Girl.

== Comparisons ==
"L.A.-based Bone Symphony takes a more conventional approach, landing somewhere between Orchestral Manoeuvers in the Dark and Real Life, and almost directly on top of Heaven 17." "The name Bone Symphony is intended to 'combine visceral aspects with intellectual ones,' and musically, that's what they succeed in doing about half the time...".

== Outside projects ==
Outside of Bone Symphony, Wilk found a career as a composer for film and television, spanning three decades. Beginning in 1982, for an episode of CBS Afternoon Playhouse. He and Levinthal also wrote the score for the film Valley Girl, which featured Nicolas Cage in his first starring role.

== Band members ==
- Scott Wilk – lead vocals, synthesizer
- Marc Levinthal – guitar, bass synthesizer and sequencer, drum machine, Roland TR-808
- Jacob Magnusson – keyboard

== Discography ==
- Bone Symphony EP (1983)

=== Singles ===
Year	Song	US Main	Album
1983	"It's A Jungle Out There"	--	Bone Symphony EP
1984	"One Foot In Front of the Other"	--	Revenge Of The Nerds – Original Motion Picture Soundtrack

Soundtrack appearances

- Revenge of the Nerds – "One Foot In Front of the Other"
- Family Guy (Don't Make Me Over) – "One Foot In Front of the Other"
- Ted 2 – "One Foot In Front of the Other"
