= The Blind Side (Family Guy) =

- Family Guy episode
- Episode no.: Season 10; Episode 11
- Directed by: Bob Bowen
- Written by: Cherry Cheva
- Production code: 9ACX06
- Original air date: January 15, 2012

Guest appearances
- Jessica Barth as Sookie Stackhouse; Carrie Fisher as Angela; Sara Fletcher as Kate; Hunter Gomez; Alyson Stoner; Christine Lakin; Marlee Matlin as Stella; Tara Strong; Wendee Lee; Nana Visitor as Kate's Mother; Robert Wu

Episode chronology
← Previous "Meg and Quagmire"	Next → "Livin' on a Prayer"
- Family Guy season 10

"The Blind Side" is the eleventh episode of the tenth season of the American animated sitcom Family Guy, and the 176th episode overall. The episode originally aired on Fox in the United States on January 15, 2012. In the episode, Peter meets Stella, the new worker who replaces Opie and is deaf. Quagmire falls for her and decides to have a party for disabled women at the bar, where Brian meets a blind girl named Kate and decides to date her. Meanwhile, Lois replaces the stairs after Stewie gets a splinter, but Peter constantly slips and falls on them and eventually decides to stay upstairs for good.

The episode was written by Cherry Cheva and directed by Bob Bowen. It features guest performances by Jessica Barth, Carrie Fisher, Sara Fletcher, Hunter Gomez, Alyson Stoner, Christine Lakin, Marlee Matlin, Tara Strong, Wendee Lee, Nana Visitor, and Robert Wu, along with several recurring voice actors for the series. It received mostly positive reviews.

== Plot ==
After Opie gets fired from the brewery (apparently for excessive on-the-job masturbation), Peter's new co-worker is a very attractive deaf woman named Stella. Quagmire stops by to visit Peter and is smitten by Stella, so he puts together a "Disabled Ladies Night" at the Clam. While the gang is there, Brian sees an attractive blonde woman named Kate at the bar and successfully asks her out, only to learn that she is blind. They have a very nice first date but Brian is surprised to learn that Kate dislikes dogs. He decides to pretend to be a very hairy human and wins her over by lying at length and by turning down offers of sex. He uses her blindness in various ruses, such as faking a symphony orchestra outing in the Griffins' garage.

When Kate's parents come to visit her and invite her and Brian to dinner, Brian enlists Stewie to help him with another ruse: this one has Brian wrapped up in bandages and Stewie posing as his post-burn treatment nurse. Stewie even cuts off Brian's wagging tail and cauterizes the bleeding with a candle to keep up the charade, until Brian finally tells Kate the truth about himself. Kate admits she was willing to overcome her anti-dog beliefs but breaks up with Brian because he lied to her. However, on Stewie's advice, Brian manages to use a different voice to continue his relationship with Kate.

Meanwhile, Stewie gets a splinter from the house's badly decaying staircase, and Lois decides to replace it (while ignoring a fallen roof beam that has trapped Meg in the living room for two days). But for some reason, the new stairs become too slippery for Peter, causing him to constantly fall down and shout a tirade of obscenities whenever he tries to leave the top floor. Peter later decides to live upstairs, so Lois reluctantly has the old stairs reinstalled, to Peter's relief.

== Reception ==
In its original broadcast on January 15, 2012, "The Blind Side" was watched by 8.50 million U.S. viewers and acquired a 4.4/10 rating in the 18–49 demographic, a significant increase in ratings from the previous week's episode, "Meg and Quagmire". This also makes it the highest-viewed episode since season nine's "New Kidney in Town", which was viewed by 9.29 million people. The critical reaction was fairly positive. Kate Moon of TV Fanatic did not think Peter's staircase subplot line was funny and also thought the show should have used Marlee Matlin for more than just a few lines in the beginning, but she did think the episode was funny, specifically praising Stewie's moments in the episode. Ultimately, she gave the episode a 3.5 out of 5.

Kevin McFarland of The A.V. Club gave the episode a B+, saying "The cutaways that came out of this plot didn't work for me, particularly Peter's contraption that lifts Joe, leading him to ecstatically believe that he's dead and is rising to Heaven. The potshots at True Blood and Showgirls also fell flat because they felt like beating a dead horse, but I'll take what I can get. When the main plot makes coherent sense, the B-plot makes me laugh consistently through simple but effective comedic escalation, and the cutaways don't fill the room with groans, Family Guy succeeds. This is a decidedly above-average episode and one that didn't get dragged down by the little bits that didn't work. It's not as good as “Back to the Pilot,” which remains the high water mark of the season so far, but “The Blind Side” can rest comfortably in second place for now."
