= A Million Ways to Die in the West =

2014 film by Seth MacFarlane

- Theatrical release poster
- Directed by: Seth MacFarlane
- Written by: Seth MacFarlane; Alec Sulkin; Wellesley Wild
- Produced by: Scott Stuber; Jason Clark; Seth MacFarlane
- Starring: Seth MacFarlane; Charlize Theron; Amanda Seyfried; Giovanni Ribisi; Neil Patrick Harris; Sarah Silverman; Liam Neeson
- Cinematography: Michael Barrett
- Edited by: Jeff Freeman
- Music by: Joel McNeely
- Production companies: MRC; Fuzzy Door Productions; Bluegrass Films
- Distributed by: Universal Pictures
- Release dates: May 16, 2014 (Regency Village Theatres); May 30, 2014 (United States)
- Running time: 116 minutes
- Country: United States
- Language: English
- Budget: $40 million
- Box office: $87.2 million

A Million Ways to Die in the West is a 2014 American Western comedy film directed by Seth MacFarlane and written by MacFarlane, Alec Sulkin and Wellesley Wild. The film features an ensemble cast including MacFarlane, Charlize Theron, Amanda Seyfried, Neil Patrick Harris, Giovanni Ribisi, Sarah Silverman, and Liam Neeson. The film follows a cowardly frontiersman who gains courage with the help of a female gunfighter and must use his newfound skills in a confrontation with her villainous outlaw husband.

Development began while MacFarlane and co-writers Sulkin and Wild were watching Western movies during the development of Ted (2012). Casting was done between December 2012 and March 2013. Filming began on May 6, 2013, in various locations in New Mexico including Albuquerque and Santa Fe, and it concluded on August 9 that year. Joel McNeely composed the score.

The film was released on May 30, 2014, in the United States, and distributed worldwide by Universal Pictures. The film received mixed to negative reviews from critics and would gross $87.2 million against a $40 million budget.

== Plot ==
In 1882, in the town of Old Stump, Arizona, timid sheep farmer Albert Stark's girlfriend, Louise, breaks up with him because of his refusal to defend himself in a duel, because he is scared of doing such. He prepares to migrate to San Francisco, believing that the frontier offers nothing for him.

Meanwhile, infamous outlaw Clinch Leatherwood shoots and kills an old prospector over a single gold nugget. He orders his right-hand man Lewis to escort his wife Anna to Old Stump while he continues his banditry.

Lewis and Anna arrive in Old Stump under the guise of siblings looking to build a farm, but Lewis is arrested for shooting the pastor's son in a saloon fight. During the brawl, Albert saves Anna from being crushed to death; they become close friends.

Attending the county fair, Louise's arrogant new boyfriend Foy challenges Albert to a shooting contest. Albert loses, but Anna steps in and defeats him. He publicly humiliates Albert, who impulsively challenges Foy to a duel that will happen the next week. Knowing that Albert would lose to Foy, Anna suggests that they duel in a week's time to win back Louise. Anna then spends the week teaching Albert how to shoot.

During a barn dance the night before the duel, Anna slips a laxative into Foy's whiskey. After leaving the dance, she and Albert kiss before heading home. After breaking out of jail and murdering the sheriff, Lewis observes their kiss and reports it to Clinch. On the day of the duel, Foy arrives late, but ends up having to have severe diarrhea from the laxative he had unknowingly ingested.

Albert, who has decided that Louise is not worth fighting for, forfeits anyway. He retires to the saloon, but Clinch arrives and reveals that Anna is his wife, threatening to kill more people unless Anna's lover duels him the next day.

Later, Clinch confronts Anna by demanding that she reveal Albert's name and his whereabouts, or he will kill Plugger, the old prospector's dog that Anna adopted after his death. He tries to rape her, but she knocks him unconscious with a rock and escapes.

Anna returns to Albert's farm to warn him about Clinch, but Albert chastises her for lying to him. Clinch, having regained consciousness, tracks her down to the farm, but Albert helps her escape; he then escapes himself.

While fleeing, Albert is captured by a tribe of Apaches, who threaten to burn him alive. They spare him when he reveals that he can speak their language. They give him a bowl of peyote, which he drinks in its entirety, sending him flashing back to his birth and through painful events of his childhood before a vision of Anna makes him realize he loves her.

Meanwhile, Clinch recaptures Anna in town, but Albert returns to Old Stump and confronts him. He wounds Clinch with a bullet dipped in rattlesnake venom before his own gun is shot out of his hand but Albert stalls until Clinch succumbs to the venom and dies. Louise attempts to win back Albert, but he rejects her and instead happily enters into a relationship with Anna. He also receives a bounty for killing Clinch, so he uses the money to buy more sheep.

In the post-credits scene, Django Freeman arrives to challenge the offensive "Runaway Slave" game at the town fair's shooting gallery, but instead shoots the owner.

== Cast ==
- Seth MacFarlane as Albert Stark, a timid but kind-hearted and intelligent sheepherder who loathes the frontier out of fear of everything that could kill him.
  - Mike Salazar as 6-year-old Albert
  - Preston Bailey as 12-year-old Albert
- Charlize Theron as Anna Barnes-Leatherwood, Clinch Leatherwood's rebellious wife, who befriends Albert.
- Amanda Seyfried as Louise, Albert's unappreciative ex-girlfriend.
- Giovanni Ribisi as Edward, a cobbler, Albert's best friend and Ruth's boyfriend.
- Neil Patrick Harris as Foy, a rich, snobby Old Stump inhabitant and Louise's current boyfriend.
- Sarah Silverman as Ruth, Edward's girlfriend and a prostitute.
- Liam Neeson as Clinch Leatherwood, a notorious outlaw and Anna's abusive husband.
- Wes Studi as Chief Cochise, the leader of a band of Apache Indians.
- John Aylward as Pastor Wilson, the local pastor at Old Stump.
- Matt Clark as the Old Prospector, an unfortunate victim of Clinch's gang.
- Evan Jones as Lewis, a ruthlessly violent gunman and Clinch Leatherwood's right-hand man.
- Jay Patterson as Dr. Harper
- Brett Rickaby as Charlie Blanche
- Aaron McPherson as Ben
- Alex Borstein as Millie, a madam at the local brothel where Ruth works.
- Rex Linn as the Sheriff/Narrator
- Christopher Hagen as George Stark, Albert's abusive father.
- Ralph Garman as Dan
- Amick Byram as Marcus Thornton
- Jean Effron as Elsie Stark, Albert's mother.
- Dylan Kenin as Pastor's Son, who is killed by Lewis in the bar.

=== Cameos ===
- Jamie Foxx as Django Freeman (uncredited), who shoots the owner of the "Runaway Slave" game. The scene was added after test audiences reacted poorly to the shooting gallery's cartoon African-American slaves as targets.
- Ryan Reynolds as a man Clinch kills in the saloon (uncredited)
- Tait Fletcher as Cowboy #1
- Gilbert Gottfried as Abraham Lincoln, seen during Albert's drug trip.
- Mike Henry as smiling man in photograph (uncredited)
- Dennis Haskins as Snake Oil Salesman
- John Michael Higgins as Dandy #1
- Christopher Lloyd as Doc Brown, whom Albert stumbles upon working on the DeLorean time machine
- Bill Maher as a traveling comedian (uncredited)
- Ewan McGregor as Cowboy at Fair, who mocks Albert.
- Alec Sulkin as Guy at Fair
- Rupert Boneham as guy in bar fight (uncredited)
- Kaley Cuoco as a woman that Albert tries to pick up in a store (unrated version only, uncredited))
- Patrick Stewart as a long-legged sheep seen during Albert's drug trip (voice, uncredited))
- Mae Whitman as Prostitute (uncredited)

== Production ==
=== Development ===
A Million Ways to Die in the West originated as an inside joke between Seth MacFarlane and co-writers Alec Sulkin and Wellesley Wild, while they were watching Hang 'Em High (1968). The joke evolved into "riffing on the idea of how dull, depressing, and dangerous it must have been to live in the Wild West." MacFarlane, a lifelong fan of westerns, began researching the topic, using Jeff Guinn's nonfiction novel, The Last Gunfight: The Real Story of the Shootout at the O.K. Corral—And How It Changed the American West as an "invaluable resource," and basis for many of the ways of dying in the film. Various aspects of the film were inspired by western films. The decision to make Albert a sheepherder was inspired by Montana (1950) and his timid demeanor by 3:10 to Yuma (1957). Other westerns that inspired MacFarlane and the crew during writing included Oklahoma! (1955), The Man Who Shot Liberty Valance (1962), and El Dorado (1966). The film was first announced on December 3, 2012, marking MacFarlane's second foray into live-action directing, after 2012's Ted. Tippett Studio was hired to work on the film's visual effects.

=== Casting ===
On January 30, 2013, it was announced that Charlize Theron had joined the film. Theron later revealed that she "begged" for her role, as she wanted the opportunity to work in comedy. On February 11, it was announced Amanda Seyfried had joined the film. On March 6, it was announced Liam Neeson and Giovanni Ribisi had joined the film. Neeson, who nearly always suppresses his Irish accent when acting, agreed to play the part of Clinch only on the condition that he could use his Irish accent. In an interview on The Tonight Show Starring Jimmy Fallon, Neeson remarked that he made this demand because an episode of MacFarlane's Family Guy had previously made a joke out of the juxtaposition of Neeson playing a cowboy with an Irish accent. On March 18, it was announced that Sarah Silverman was cast to play a prostitute in the film. On May 10, it was announced that the film would be co-financed by Media Rights Capital and Fuzzy Door Productions, along with Bluegrass Films and distributed by Universal Studios. On May 11, 2013, it was announced that Neil Patrick Harris had joined the film. On May 29, 2013, MacFarlane announced that Bill Maher had joined the cast. On February 21, 2014, he announced that Gilbert Gottfried had also joined the cast.

=== Filming ===
Principal photography began on May 6, 2013. Filming locations included various areas in and around Albuquerque, New Mexico, also including the Santa Fe Studio in Santa Fe. Principal photography ended on August 9, 2013. The film shoot was difficult, as the cast and crew navigated rough weather: "everything from hailstorms to blistering heat to arctic winds and torrential rainstorms."

== Soundtrack ==
A Million Ways to Die in the West

Soundtrack album by Joel McNeely
- Released: May 27, 2014
- Recorded: 2014
- Genre: Film score
- Length: 41:20
- Label: Back Lot Music

Joel McNeely film scores chronology
The Pirate Fairy (2014)	A Million Ways to Die in the West (2014)	Tinker Bell and the Legend of the NeverBeast (2014)

The score was composed by Joel McNeely. The soundtrack was released by Back Lot Music on May 27, 2014. The theme song "A Million Ways to Die" is performed by Alan Jackson. It was released as a single on April 29, 2014. A portion of the Back to the Future theme by Alan Silvestri is used during Christopher Lloyd's cameo. Near the end of the movie, the refrain of "Tarzan Boy" by Baltimora is used as a fictional "Muslim Death Chant."

Track listing

All music is composed by Joel McNeely, except as noted.

No.	Title	Length
1.	"A Million Ways to Die" (performed by Alan Jackson)	2:27
2.	"Main Title"	2:33
3.	"Missing Louise"	2:08
4.	"Old Stump"	0:45
5.	"Saloon Brawl"	1:50
6.	"Rattlesnake Ridge"	1:28
7.	"People Die at the Fair"	2:11
8.	"The Shooting Lesson"	2:16
9.	"The Barn Dance"	2:29
10.	"If You've Only Got a Moustache" (composed by Stephen Foster, performed by Amick Byram)	1:31
11.	"Anna and Albert"	4:19
12.	"Clinch Hunts Albert"	3:41
13.	"Racing the Train"	2:21
14.	"Captured by Cochise"	2:07
15.	"Albert Takes a Trip"	2:24
16.	"The Showdown"	2:20
17.	"Sheep to the Horizon"	2:00
18.	"End Title Suite"	2:30
Total length:		41:20

== Release ==
On May 16, 2014, the film had its world premiere at the Regency Village Theater in Los Angeles. The film was later released nationwide on May 30, 2014. The film was produced by Media Rights Capital, Fuzzy Door Productions, and Bluegrass Films and distributed by Universal Pictures.

=== Marketing ===
On January 27, 2014, MacFarlane announced that he wrote a novelization based on the film's script, which was released on March 4, 2014. An audio-book version was also made available, narrated by Jonathan Frakes. MacFarlane wrote the book on weekends during shooting for the film, partially due to boredom.

=== Home media ===
A Million Ways to Die in the West was released via DVD and Blu-ray on October 7, 2014, by Universal Studios Home Entertainment. The Blu-ray release contains an unrated version (135 minutes), along with the original theatrical cut (116 minutes). In the United States, the film has grossed $8,336,420 from DVD sales and $6,739,162 from Blu-ray sales, making a total of $15,075,582.

== Reception ==
=== Box office ===
The film grossed $43.1 million in North America and $43.3 million in other territories, for a worldwide total of $86.4 million, against its $40 million budget.

It grossed $16.8 million in its opening weekend, finishing in third place at the box office behind fellow newcomer Maleficent and the previous weekend's opener X-Men: Days of Future Past. This was below expectations of $26 million. In its second weekend, the film dropped to number five, grossing an additional $7.3 million. In its third weekend, the film dropped to number eight, grossing $3.2 million. In its fourth weekend, the film dropped to number 11, grossing $1.6 million.

In 2026, English director Edgar Wright confessed to the Far Out Magazine website that he'd "rubbed his hands with glee" when Million Ways flopped, because when Wright's movie Scott Pilgrim vs the World bombed at the box office, McFarlane had tweeted, "Scott Pilgrim 0, the World 2."

=== Critical response ===
A Million Ways to Die in the West received mixed to negative reviews from critics. Review aggregation website Rotten Tomatoes gave the film a 33% rating based on 212 reviews, with an average score of 4.90/10. The site's consensus states, "While it offers a few laughs and boasts a talented cast, Seth MacFarlane's overlong, aimless A Million Ways to Die in the West is a disappointingly scattershot affair." Another review aggregation website, Metacritic, gave a score of 44 out of 100, based on reviews from 43 critics, indicating "mixed or average" reviews. Audiences surveyed by CinemaScore gave the film an average grade of "B" on an A+ to F scale; opening weekend demographics were 55% male and 72% over 25 years of age.

Claudia Puig's review in USA Today was largely positive, writing, "A Western with a contemporary sensibility and dialogue that sounds markedly modern, A Million Ways to Die in the West is quintessential MacFarlane, at once silly and witty, juvenile and clever." Stephen Holden's review in The New York Times was mainly neutral, calling the film "a live-action spinoff of Family Guy, with different characters." "While the whole thing feels weirdly miscalculated to me, A Million Ways to Die in the West tweaks the formula just enough, delivers a few laughs and keeps the guest stars coming," wrote Salon columnist Andrew O'Hehir. Rafer Guzman of Newsday found the film amusing, calling it "another example of MacFarlane's ability to mix poop jokes with romance, foul language with sweet sentiment, offensive humor with boyish charm."

Scott Mendelson of Forbes commended MacFarlane's decision to make an unconventional western comedy, but summarized the film as "just ambitious enough for that to be genuinely disappointing." Michael O'Sullivan at The Washington Post was mixed, deeming the film a "broad, wildly hit-or-miss satire," remarking that he found few of the jokes in the film funny. "Spiritually, it's closer to a mid-range crowd-pleaser such as City Slickers than Blazing Saddles, too enamoured of genre convention to reach for the comic dynamite," wrote Mike McCahill at The Guardian.

Michael Phillips of the Chicago Tribune criticized MacFarlane's acting and direction as: "A failure of craft. He can't direct action, or even handle scenery well. He can't set up a visual joke properly without resorting to head-butting and bone-crunching, and he doesn't know how, or when, to move his camera. He's not good enough as a romantic lead to anchor a picture." Richard Corliss of Time called the film a "sagebrush comedy whose visual grandeur and appealing actors get polluted by some astonishingly lazy writing." Scott Foundas of Variety found the film "overlong and uninspired," criticizing the film's "lazy writing," and MacFarlane's "surprisingly bland" comic performance.

Rene Rodriguez of the Miami Herald gave the film one star, commenting, "There are enough laughs scattered throughout A Million Ways to Die in the West that while you're watching it, the movie seems like a passable comedy. By the time you get home, though, you can barely remember the jokes." John DeFore of The Hollywood Reporter criticized the film's running time: "Though the film is hardly laugh-free, its uneven jokes appear to have breezed through a very forgiving editing process." Joe Morgenstern of The Wall Street Journal too found the film's length "exhausting," noting, "Some of it sputters, settling for smiles instead of laughs, and much of it flounders while the slapdash script searches [...] for ever more common denominators in toilet humor."

=== Accolades ===
Award	Date of ceremony	Category	Recipients	Result
People's Choice Award	January 7, 2015	Favorite Comedic Movie Actress	Charlize Theron	Nominated
International Film Music Critics Association Award	February 19, 2015	Best Original Score for a Comedy Film	Joel McNeely	Nominated
Golden Raspberry Awards	February 21, 2015	Worst Actor	Seth MacFarlane	Nominated
Golden Raspberry Awards	February 21, 2015	Worst Actress	Charlize Theron	Nominated
Golden Raspberry Awards	February 21, 2015	Worst Director	Seth MacFarlane	Nominated
Golden Raspberry Awards	February 21, 2015	Worst Screen Combo	Seth MacFarlane and Charlize Theron	Nominated
