= Everybody Needs a Best Friend =

Song by Norah Jones

from the album Ted: Original Motion Picture Soundtrack
- Language: English
- Released: June 26, 2012
- Studio: Brooklyn Recording (Brooklyn, NY)
- Genre: Jazz
- Length: 2:28
- Label: Universal Republic
- Composer: Walter Murphy
- Lyricist: Seth MacFarlane

Music video
- "Everybody Needs a Best Friend" on YouTube

"Everybody Needs a Best Friend" is a song from the 2012 feature film Ted, with music composed by Walter Murphy and lyrics by Seth MacFarlane. Performed by Norah Jones during the film's opening credits, the song was used as the film's main theme song. It was released by Universal Republic Records on June 26, 2012.

In January 2013, the song was nominated for the Academy Award for Best Original Song at the 85th Academy Awards. MacFarlane was also the host of the Oscars while also being nominated.

The song’s opening verse was repurposed as the title theme in the Ted prequel series, which premiered in 2024.

== Background ==
Seth MacFarlane had sent Walter Murphy the script of Ted and said, "first of all, he wanted an old-fashioned score that would have themes for the individual characters. That idea intrigued me because in most summer films the score goes in and out of pop songs and isn't usually constructed that way. He also wanted a main title song that I could quote throughout the film."

MacFarlane had sent Murphy a set of lyrics, a different set of lyrics than the ones they used in "Everybody Needs a Best Friend," and Murphy would then write the theme. When MacFarlane had started filming of Ted, Murphy thought it would be funnier if the song were sung from the standpoint of Ted, so he rewrote the lyrics. Murphy then did a Nelson Riddle–type arrangement, and when they started recording, he got the idea of taking it to Norah Jones. Murphy flew to New York City with the Pro Tools files of the work they did on the scoring stage at Fox with a big band and string orchestra.

== Live performance and cover versions ==
Norah Jones performed the song live for the first time on The Tonight Show with Jay Leno. Jones performed the song at the 85th Academy Awards ceremony on February 24, 2013. Seth MacFarlane performed the song in August 2014 at the Hollywood Bowl during a John Williams concert. 2024 Barbershop Harmony Society quartet champions Three and a Half Men performed a barbershop arrangement of the song during the 2024 International Quartet Finals.
