= Scott Stuber =

American film producer

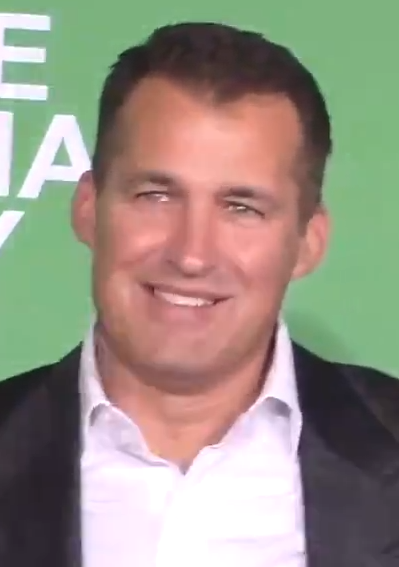
- Stuber at the premiere of Office Christmas Party in 2016
- Born: December 13, 1968 (age 57); Granada Hills, Los Angeles, United States
- Education: University of Arizona
- Occupations: Film producer, executive
- Spouses: Rachel Nichols (m. 2008; div. 2009) Molly Sims (m. 2011)
- Children: 3

Scott Stuber is an American film producer. He was the chairman of Netflix Films from 2017 to 2024.

== Career ==
After graduating from University of Arizona with a film degree, Stuber worked at Universal Pictures as a publicity assistant to Lew Wasserman.

Stuber was co-president of production at Universal with Mary Parent and in 2004, Stuber and Parent were named Vice Chairman of Worldwide Production for Universal Pictures. In 2005, Universal signed a production contract with the duo under the shingle Stuber/Parent Productions.

In November 2008, it was announced that Stuber signed a five-year contract through 2013 with Universal Studios under his vanity card, Stuber Pictures. He has been credited with producing such films as Role Models (2008), Welcome Home, Roscoe Jenkins (2008), The Kingdom (2007), You, Me and Dupree (2006), The Break-Up (2006), and Ted (2012). In 2012, Stuber Pictures was renamed to Bluegrass Films and Stuber's television unit renamed to Bluegrass Television.

Stuber joined Netflix in 2017. On January 19, 2023, Stuber was made chairman of Netflix Films. In 2024, it was announced that Stuber was leaving Netflix to start a new company.

In April 2022 Stuber was appointed to the Board of Governors of the British Film Institute for a term of four years.

On March 26, 2024, it was confirmed that Stuber's first project since leaving Netflix would be producing a film based on the 2023 Warren Zanes book Deliver Me from Nowhere: The Making of Bruce Springsteen's Nebraska that documented the making of Bruce Springsteen's 1982 album, Nebraska, with Scott Cooper set to write and direct the film and actor Jeremy Allen White playing the role of Springsteen. Springsteen and his manager Jon Landau also involved in the making of the film. Originally reported to be in production at A24, the film was later revealed to have been acquired by 20th Century Studios.

In July 2024, Stuber entered a first look deal with Amazon MGM Studios to revive the storied company United Artists, which had been dormant for over a decade and existed mainly in-name only through companies under MGM including United Artists Releasing, as a label under the former. As part of the deal, Stuber will produce films under his own company for United Artists either for a theatrical release or streaming release through Amazon Prime Video; Stuber will also be involved with every project released under the banner.

In February 2026, was announced that Stuber would co-produce a biopic about Lance Armstrong. It was also reported that Stuber had gotten the rights to make a biopic about Armstrong before his 2024 deal with United Artists, which will thus allow the film to go to market and prevented United Artists parent company Amazon MGM Studios from getting first dibs.

== Personal life ==
On July 26, 2008, Stuber married actress Rachel Nichols. However, after seven months of marriage, they announced that they were divorcing in February 2009 due to irreconcilable differences.

He met Molly Sims sometime around 2009 - 2010. After dating for over a year, he married Molly Sims, on September 24, 2011, at a Napa Valley Vineyard. The couple have three children: sons born in 2012 and 2017; and a daughter born in 2015.

== Filmography ==
=== Film ===
Actor

Year	Title	Role
1995	Free Willy 2: The Adventure Home	Policeman
1995	Assassins	Parking Attendant at Marriott Hotel

Producer

- Volcano (1997) (Associate producer)
- The Break-Up (2006)
- You, Me and Dupree (2006)
- The Kingdom (2007)
- Welcome Home, Roscoe Jenkins (2008)
- Role Models (2008)
- Love Happens (2009)
- Couples Retreat (2009)
- The Wolfman (2010)
- Repo Men (2010)
- Love & Other Drugs (2010)
- Your Highness (2011)
- Safe House (2012)
- Battleship (2012)
- Ted (2012)
- Identity Thief (2013)
- Endless Love (2014)
- A Million Ways to Die in the West (2014)
- Kill the Messenger (2014)
- Ted 2 (2015)
- Central Intelligence (2016)
- Free State of Jones (2016)
- Patriots Day (2016)
- Office Christmas Party (2016)
- The Third Wheel (2016)
- Frankenstein (2025)
- Springsteen: Deliver Me from Nowhere (2025)
- The Thomas Crown Affair (2027)
- Panic Carefully (2027)
- Lizard Music (2027)
- Highlander (TBA)

Executive producer

- The Internship (2013)
- 47 Ronin (2013)
- Little Evil (2017)

=== Television ===
Executive producer

Year	Title	Notes
2010	The Pink House	TV movie
2011–2013	Whitney	37 episodes
2012	Brothers in Law	TV movie
2017	Ryan Hansen Solves Crimes on Television	8 episodes
2017–2018	The Mayor	13 episodes
2019	The Umbrella Academy	Episode "We Only See Each Other at Weddings and Funerals"
