= Jakob Frímann Magnússon =

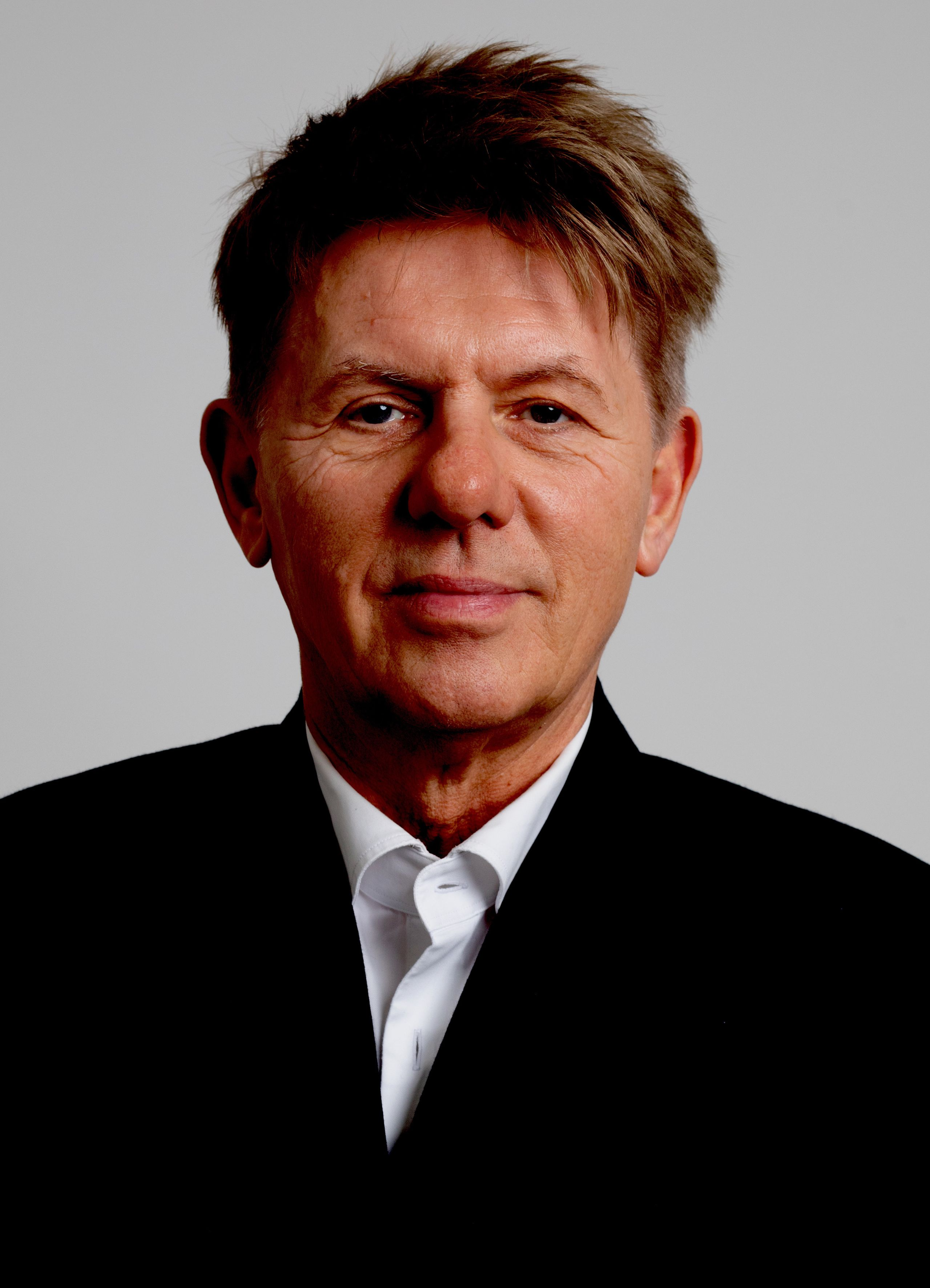

Background information
- Born: 4 May 1953 (age 72); Copenhagen, Denmark
- Occupations: Composer, keyboard player, film director and producer
- Years active: 1979-present
- Formerly of: Bone Symphony
- Website: https://www.jakobfrimann.is/

Jakob Frímann Magnússon (born 4 May 1953) is a Danish-born Icelandic politician, composer, keyboard player, film director and producer. In Iceland he is best known as the keyboardist and one of the founders of the multiartistic band Stuðmenn, with which he has so far produced 16 albums as of 2017. He has also directed, produced and starred in several films, and released several solo albums with a number of famous jazz musicians from the United States. For a period of the 1990s he was the cultural attaché of the Icelandic embassy in London. Since 2002, aside from playing in Stuðmenn and recording new albums, Jakob Frímann is the co-owner and manager of the advertisement agency Bankastræti in Reykjavík.

Jakob studied music in California between 1977 and 1980. During his time in the U.S. he started his own band with Carlos Rios (guitar), Steve Anderson (bass) and David Logeman (drums) and released several albums with jazz-influenced music. On these albums he also involved many talented musicians such as Bill Champlin, Vinnie Colaiuta, Neil Stubenhaus, Abe Laboriel, Ernie Watts, Tom Scott, Peter Banks all of them big names in Jazz and Jazz Fusion. He has also been a studio musician for a number of American and Icelandic artists, and is known for his distinctive and tasteful keyboard solos and brilliant treatment of the Rhodes piano and various synthesizers.

His 1985 film Cool Jazz and Coconuts was entered into the 14th Moscow International Film Festival.

== Selected discography ==
- Empire Mark I (1974)
- Empire Mark II (1977)
- Special Treatment (1979)
- Jack Magnet (1981)
- Tvær systur / Time Zone (1982)
- Ragga & the Jack Magic Orchestra (1997)
- Human Body Orchestra (1998)
- Made in Reykjavik (2002)
- Piano (2005)
- Jack Magnet Quintet Live (2012)
- Global Warming (2016)
- High North (2020)

== Selected films ==
- Með allt á hreinu (On Top) (1982) (still the most successful film in the history of Icelandic cinema)
- Brasilíufararnir (1982)
- Nickel Mountain (1984)
- Kókóstré og Hvítir Mávar (Cool Jazz and Coconuts) (1985)
- Rocking China (1986)
- Í takt vid tímann (Ahead of Times) (2004)
