= John Jacobs (producer) =

American film and television producer

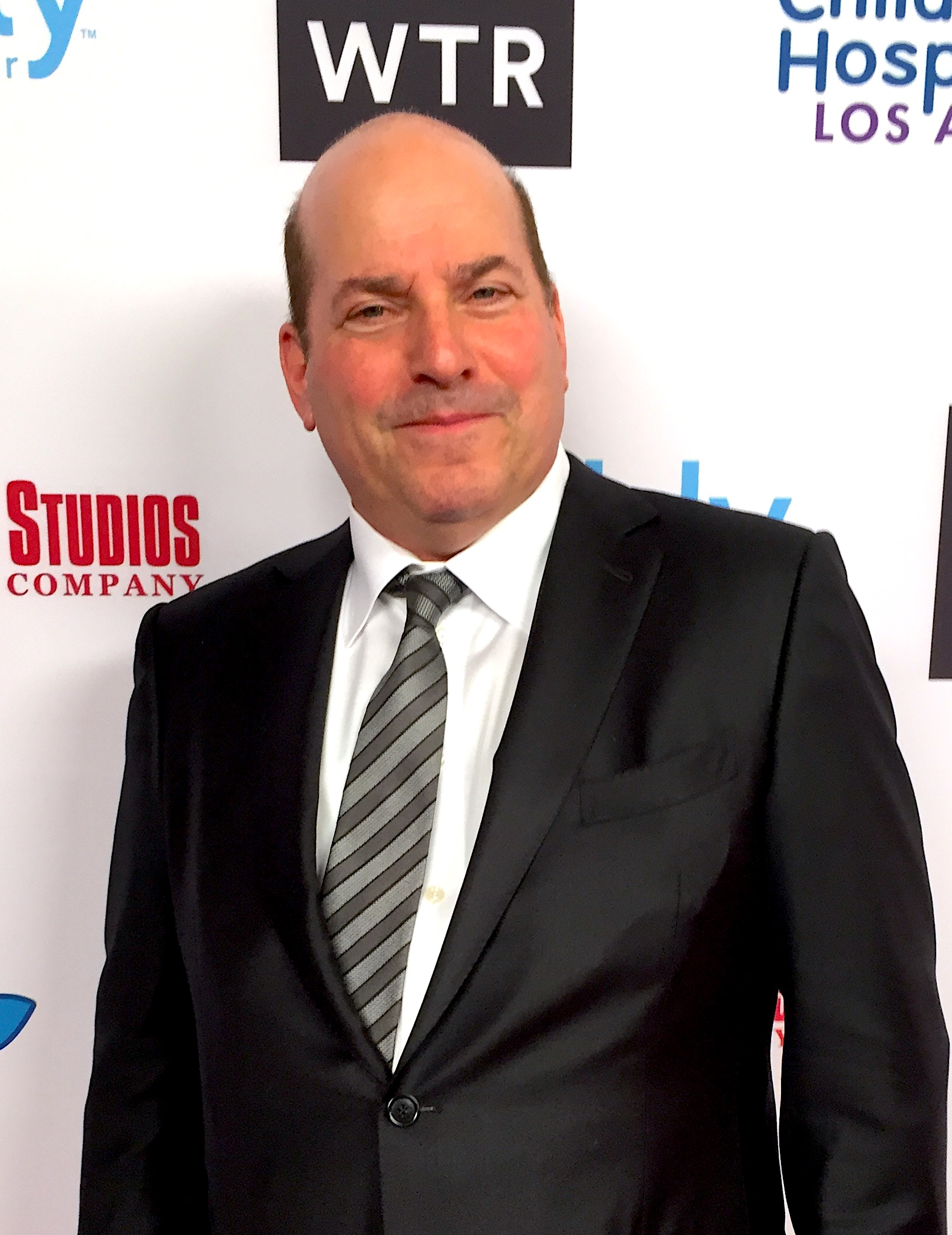
- Producer John Jacobs, 2018
- Education: American Film Institute
- Occupations: Film & television producer
- Notable work: Ted; Ted 2; Blades of Glory; Anger Management

John Jacobs is an American film and television producer best known for producing the films Anger Management, Blades of Glory, Ted, Ted 2, and Beverly Hills Chihuahua. He is also credited as a consulting producer on several television shows including Family Guy and American Dad. John has produced for most of the major studios including Universal Pictures, DreamWorks, Paramount, Disney, FOX, and Sony. Since 1998, Jacobs' films have grossed over a billion dollars worldwide.

== Early life ==
From an early age, Jacobs was intrigued with the film business, often sneaking downstairs to watch late-night television and movies. He studied film at New York University and graduated from the American Film Institute in Los Angeles. Jacobs describes his route to producing as a "circuitous path," first spending several years as an actor in college, and subsequently working as a screenwriter, selling scripts to several major studios. Once Jacobs had the opportunity to work on the production side of the business, he realized that he had an affinity for it, reporting that his input was well received by studios.

== Career ==
The first two films Jacobs developed were Mississippi Burning (1988) and Dirty Rotten Scoundrels (1988), both for Orion Pictures. In 1995, Jacobs became president of Steel Productions, founded by former Columbia Pictures chairwoman Dawn Steel—who produced the smash hit Cool Runnings. He later served as president of Atlas Entertainment, where he developed the films 12 Monkeys and City of Angels. He followed these projects with his first independent feature, The First to Go, which he directed and produced. In 2001, Jacobs formed his own production and management company, Smart Entertainment where he managed many writers, directors, and producers including, Emmy winner Seth MacFarlane who he continues to produce for.

Following his early successes, Jacobs produced three consecutive “number one” box office films: Blades of Glory (2007), Beverly Hills Chihuahua (2008), and Ted (2012), the latter two of which spawned movie franchises. Jacobs also has film-producing credits for My Boss’s Daughter, The Ringer, and The Boy Next Door, which earned him recognition by the Producers Guild Association in 2015.

Several of Jacobs’ films have received industry awards. Mississippi Burning was nominated for an Academy Award for Best Picture and for Best Actor. Blades of Glory won a BMI Film Music Award, a Costume Designers Guild Award, and a Teen Choice Award, while Ted received two Behind The Voice acting awards and an ASCAP award.

Jacobs’ work also includes producing credits on animated shows including Family Guy, American Dad, and The Cleveland Show. He has stated that his favorite parts of the film business are working with great stories and talented people.

Jacobs’ most recent projects include Dashing Through The Snow, a Disney-backed action film starring Kevin Hart, Ricky Stanicky, with director Peter Farrelly for Prime Video (formerly at Lionsgate), and Happily Ever After, with Reese Witherspoon.
