= Ted 2 =

2015 film by Seth MacFarlane

- Theatrical release poster
- Directed by: Seth MacFarlane
- Written by: Seth MacFarlane; Alec Sulkin; Wellesley Wild
- Based on: Characters by Seth MacFarlane
- Produced by: Scott Stuber; Seth MacFarlane; Jason Clark; John Jacobs
- Starring: Mark Wahlberg; Seth MacFarlane; Amanda Seyfried; Giovanni Ribisi; John Slattery; Jessica Barth; Morgan Freeman
- Cinematography: Michael Barrett
- Edited by: Jeff Freeman
- Music by: Walter Murphy
- Production companies: MRC; Fuzzy Door Productions; Bluegrass Films
- Distributed by: Universal Pictures
- Release dates: June 24, 2015 (Ziegfeld Theater); June 26, 2015 (United States)
- Running time: 115 minutes
- Country: United States
- Language: English
- Budget: $68 million
- Box office: $217 million

Ted 2 (stylized as ted2) is a 2015 American fantasy stoner comedy film directed by Seth MacFarlane and written by MacFarlane, Alec Sulkin, and Wellesley Wild. A sequel to Ted (2012), the film reprises the roles of MacFarlane, Mark Wahlberg, Giovanni Ribisi, and Jessica Barth with Amanda Seyfried, John Slattery, and Morgan Freeman joining the cast. The film follows Ted as he fights for his civil rights in order to be recognized as a person and not as property so he can adopt a child. Principal photography began in Massachusetts in July 2014.

Ted 2 premiered at the Ziegfeld Theater on June 24, 2015, and was released in the United States on June 26 by Universal Pictures. Despite mixed-to-negative reviews, it was a box-office success, grossing $217 million on a $68 million budget. It was followed by a prequel television series, which premiered in 2024. An animated series is set to premiere in December 2026, with MacFarlane, Wahlberg, Seyfried, and Barth reprising their roles.

== Plot ==
Two years after the events of the first film, Ted marries his girlfriend, Tami-Lynn, six months after John Bennett and Lori Collins divorced. One year later, following a heated argument between Ted and Tami-Lynn, their co-worker Joy suggests to him that they have a baby to keep their marriage alive. When Ted discusses it with Tami-Lynn, they both agree. As Ted cannot father a child, John helps find a sperm donor.

After failed attempts to find a donor and being chased off by Tom Brady for trying to masturbate him in his sleep, John ultimately offers to donate his own sperm, but Tami-Lynn is found to be infertile due to past drug use. Subsequently, the couple decide to adopt. The background checks bring Ted's legal status as a person into question, and the Massachusetts state authorities declare Ted to be property rather than human. As a result, Ted is fired from his job, his credit card and bank accounts are terminated, and his marriage to Tami-Lynn is annulled. John suggests that they take the state to court. Approaching the best lawyer they can find, he assigns the case pro bono to his niece Samantha L. Jackson, a novice lawyer. They are initially reluctant due to her age and lack of pop culture knowledge but bond over their love of marijuana as they prepare to present the case.

Meanwhile, Donny, Ted's life-long stalker, is now a janitor at Hasbro's headquarters in New York City. He proposes to the senior vice-president to abduct Ted for research to manufacture live teddy bears commercially. Donny convinces him to hire an expert attorney to ensure that Ted maintains his status as property.

Despite Sam's best efforts, the court rules against Ted. Disheartened and desperate, the trio contact Patrick Meighan, a highly respected civil rights attorney, to help overturn the court's decision. During a Manhattan trip to meet him, John and Sam fall in love and eventually kiss. When the trio meets Meighan, he is sympathetic to Ted's plight but ultimately refuses the case, as he believes Ted has not significantly contributed to humanity due to his hedonistic lifestyle. Infuriated at the injustice and jealous of John's relationship with Sam, Ted takes out his frustrations on the two and angrily leaves. He wanders into the New York Comic-Con while Donny, disguised as a Raphael, discreetly follows Ted inside. When Ted encounters Donny, he flees and Donny chases him. Ted steals another person's cell phone to contact Sam and John to inform them of his situation, just before Donny abducts him.

John and Sam arrive and find Ted, just as Donny is about to cut him open, so John punches Donny in the face. Ted quickly reconciles with John and Sam. However, as they are leaving, Donny, having regained consciousness, severs the cables holding up a display model of the Enterprise-D, so it swings towards Ted. John pushes him out of the way to save him, but is hit and rendered unconscious. Donny is arrested after Ted exposes him.

John is rushed to the hospital, where he flatlines. The next day, the group is told that he has died and tearfully visits him, but he opens his eyes, revealing that the doctors revived him, then worked with him afterward to prank them. Although Sam is initially furious, she and John kiss as the group rejoices. Inspired by John's selflessness and Ted's emotions over the injured John, which is filmed and shown on the news, Meighan decides to take their case. He successfully overturns the ruling by demonstrating that Ted is self-aware, feels complex emotions, and is capable of empathy. Ted proposes to Tami-Lynn again as they leave court. Sometime later, Ted and Tami-Lynn are remarried and adopt a baby boy, naming him after Rocky character Apollo Creed while John and Sam happily pursue their relationship.

== Cast ==
- Mark Wahlberg as John Bennett
- Seth MacFarlane as the voice of Ted
  - MacFarlane also provides the voice of K.I.T.T. (Note: Only in the unrated version.)
- Amanda Seyfried as Sam Jackson
- Jessica Barth as Tami-Lynn
- Giovanni Ribisi as Donny
- Morgan Freeman as Patrick Meighan
- Patrick Warburton as Guy
- Michael Dorn as Rick
- Bill Smitrovich as Frank
- John Slattery as Shep Wild
- Cocoa Brown as Joy
- John Carroll Lynch as Tom Jessup
- Ron Canada as Judge Matheson
- Liam Neeson as Customer
- Dennis Haysbert as Fertility doctor
- Patrick Stewart as Narrator
- Rachael MacFarlane as Meighan Assistant
- Tom Brady as himself
- Jay Leno as himself
- Jimmy Kimmel as himself
- Kate McKinnon as herself
- Bobby Moynihan as himself
- Taran Killam as himself
- Sam J. Jones as himself
- Sebastian Arcelus as Dr. Ed Danzer
- Jay Patterson as Karl Jackson
- Steve Callaghan as Comic
- Nana Visitor as Adoption agent
- Maggie Geha as Female nurse
- Jessica Szohr as Allison

== Production ==
=== Conception ===
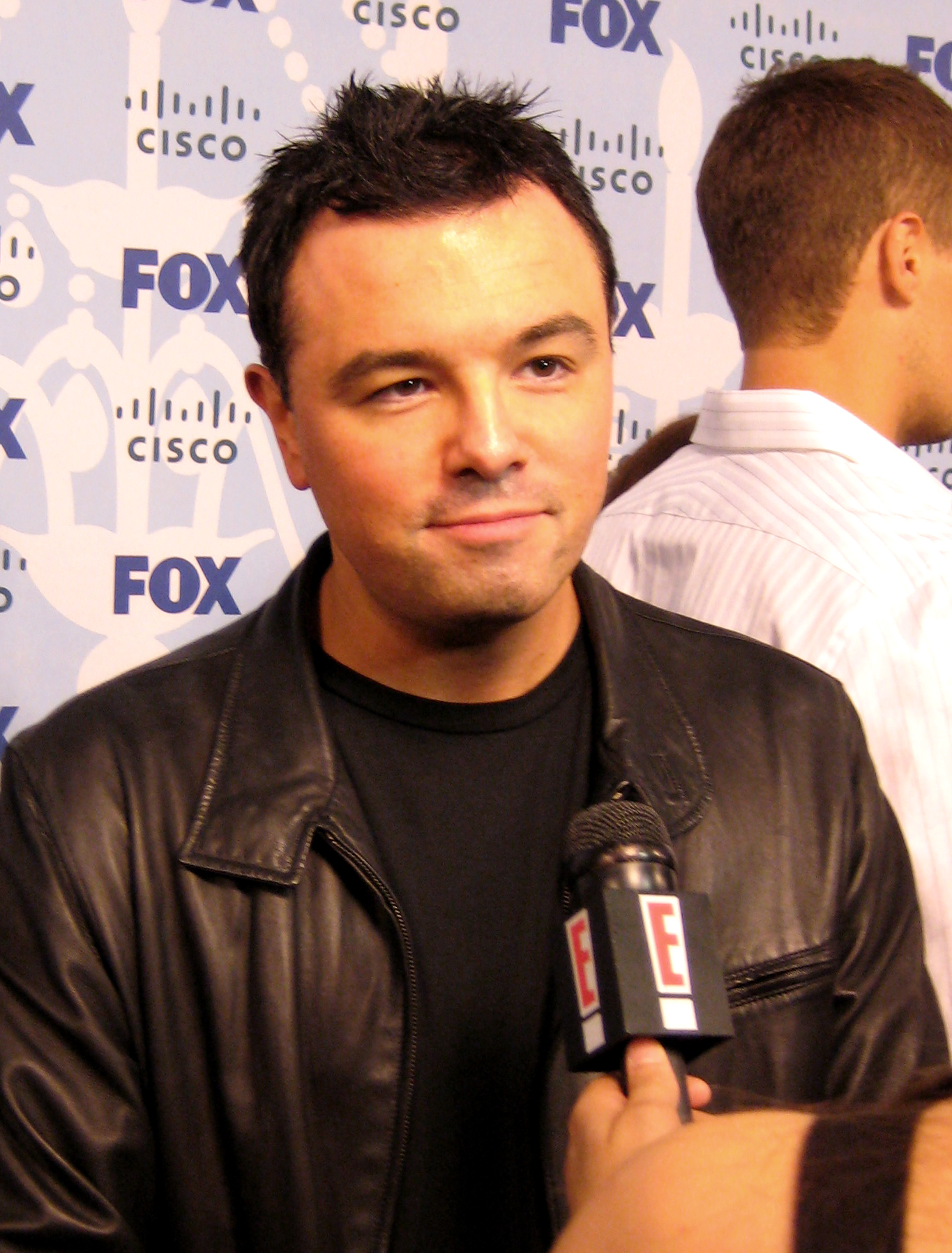
MacFarlane in 2008.

During the 2012 American Dad! San Diego Comic-Con International panel, Seth MacFarlane stated that he would be open to a second Ted film. In September, NBCUniversal chief executive Steve Burke reported that the studio was planning to make a Ted sequel as soon as possible. Negotiations for the film took place around December. In January 2013, on Anderson Live, Mark Wahlberg confirmed that the film was in production, and that it would be the first sequel in his career; also revealing that he and Ted—as voiced by MacFarlane—would make an appearance at the 85th Academy Awards. Wahlberg also confirmed that the script for the film was in development at that time. On October 2, it was announced that Ted 2 was scheduled for release on June 26, 2015.

=== Development ===
MacFarlane was looking for the film to simply be just more of John and Ted. The initial storyline conceived for the film featured Ted and John attempting to smuggle cannabis across the country, however, due to concerns that the concept was too similar to then-recently released We're the Millers, the concept was scrapped and the storyline was overhauled to one inspired by John Jakes' North and South series as well as the life of Dred Scott.

Principal photography began on July 28, 2014, and ended on November 13, 2014.

=== Casting ===
Mila Kunis was set to reprise her role of Lori during early development, but when the drug smuggling storyline was scrapped and changed to the current one, it required a lawyer to be the female lead and there was no room for Lori. On February 14, 2014, Amanda Seyfried was cast as the female lead. In a 2015 Reddit AMA, Kunis attributed her absence to scheduling conflicts, citing her pregnancy in particular. On June 17, 2014, Jessica Barth was confirmed to reprise her role as Tami-Lynn. In August and September 2014, it was announced that Patrick Warburton would return as John's co-worker Guy, and that Morgan Freeman, Nana Visitor, Michael Dorn, Dennis Haysbert, Liam Neeson and John Slattery had joined the cast. Stephen Collins announced on Twitter in October 2014 that he was also cast in an undisclosed role. However, on October 7, it was announced that Collins was fired from the film due to sexual abuse allegations against him.

== Soundtrack ==
The film's soundtrack was released by Republic Records on June 26, 2015. It features the score by Walter Murphy and songs co-written by Seth MacFarlane and Murphy, including "Mean Ol’ Moon", which is performed by Amanda Seyfried and Norah Jones separately. The soundtrack also includes "Mess Around" by Ray Charles, "One Foot in Front of the Other" by Bone Symphony and "New York" by Alfred Newman.

Track listing

All tracks by Walter Murphy except where indicated.

No.	Title	Writer(s)	Performer(s)	Length
1.	"The Wedding"			1:52
2.	"Steppin' Out with My Baby"	Irving Berlin	John Wilson, Curtis Stigers and Maida Vale Singers	6:19
3.	"Let's Make a Baby"			0:37
4.	"Tom Brady's House"			1:37
5.	"Ted's Court Case"			0:55
6.	"One Foot in Front of the Other"	Bone Symphony	Bone Symphony	3:12
7.	"Leaving for New York"			1:12
8.	"Mess Around"	Ray Charles	Ray Charles	2:41
9.	"Out of Control"			0:26
10.	"Mean Ol' Moon"	Seth MacFarlane & Walter Murphy	Amanda Seyfried	2:03
11.	"New York"	Alfred Newman	Alfred Newman	2:27
12.	"The Comic-Con Fight"			1:11
13.	"Wake Up, Johnny / Code Blue / John Is Back"			3:23
14.	"Meighan's Speech / Finale"			3:55
15.	"Mean Ol' Moon" (swing version)			1:16
16.	"Mean Ol' Moon"	Seth MacFarlane & Walter Murphy	Norah Jones	3:05
Total length:				27:21

=== Additional music ===
The following songs were featured in the film but are absent from the soundtrack:

No.	Title	Writer(s)	Performer(s)	Length
1.	"Celebration"	Robert Bell, Ronald Bell, George Brown, Eumir Deodato, Robert Mickens, Claydes Smith, J.T. Taylor, Dennis Thomas, Earl Toon	Kool & The Gang
2.	"Law & Order - Main Title"	Mike Post	Mike Post
3.	"Down and Out"	Tim Mercer, Pete Risano, Joe Russillo	Tim Mercer, Pete Risano
4.	"Tiny Dancer"	Elton John, Bernie Taupin
5.	"Gonna Fly Now"	Carol Connors, Bill Conti, Ayn Robbins
6.	"At This Moment"	Billy Vera
7.	"Angry Birds Theme"	Ari Pulkkinen
8.	"Ride Wit Me"	Eldra P. DeBarge, William Randall DeBarge, Jason Epperson, Cornell Haynes, Etterlene Jordan, Lavell Webb	Nelly featuring City Road
9.	"Knight Rider (Main Title)"	Glen Larson, Stuart Phillips
10.	"Theme from Jurassic Park"	John Williams	John Williams
11.	"Sweet Caroline"	Neil Diamond
12.	"I Think We're Alone Now"	Ritchie Cordell	Tiffany

== Release ==
On January 27, 2015, the film's teaser poster was released. This was followed two days later by its trailer. The film premiered on June 24, 2015, in New York City, with its general release two days later.

=== Home media ===
Ted 2 was released on DVD and Blu-ray on December 15, 2015, in the United States by Universal Studios Home Entertainment. Both formats contained a theatrical version (115 minutes) and an "unrated" extended version (125 minutes), containing 10 minutes of extra footage. It was released on DVD and Blu-ray in the United Kingdom and Ireland on November 23, 2015, both formats containing the two versions.

On May 3, 2016, Ted vs. Flash Gordon: The Ultimate Collection was released on Blu-ray plus Digital HD, featuring Flash Gordon and the unrated versions of Ted and Ted 2.

== Reception ==
=== Box office ===
Ted 2 grossed $81.5 million in North America and $135.7 million in other territories for a worldwide total of $217.2 million, against a budget of $68 million.

In the United States and Canada, Ted 2 opened on the same day as the family adventure film Max, across 3,441 theaters. It made $2.6 million from its Thursday night showings from 2,647 theaters, and $13.2 million on its opening day. In its opening weekend, Ted 2 earned $33.5 million, finishing third at the box office behind Jurassic World ($54.5 million) and Inside Out ($52.3 million). The opening total was a disappointment, considering the film's initial projected opening of $45–50 million, and its predecessor's $54.4 million opening three years prior. It was director MacFarlane's second consecutive underperforming opening, following 2014's A Million Ways to Die in the West, which opened to $16.8 million.

Outside North America, the film earned an estimated $20 million in its opening weekend from 26 countries. It opened in number two in Germany ($3.7 million), Russia and the CIS ($3.5 million) and Australia ($3.3 million).

=== Critical response ===
On Rotten Tomatoes, the film has an approval rating of 45% based on 202 reviews. The site's critical consensus reads, "Ted 2 reunites Mark Wahlberg and Seth MacFarlane for another round of sophomoric, scatological humor – and just as before, your enjoyment will depend on your tolerance for all of the above." On Metacritic, the film has a score of 48 out of 100 based on 38 critics, indicating "mixed or average reviews". Audiences polled by CinemaScore gave the film an average grade of "B+" on an A+ to F scale, lower than the "A−" earned by its predecessor.

James Berardinelli of ReelViews gave the film two out of four stars, saying "It would be disingenuous for me to claim that Ted 2 isn't funny. Although I was often bored by the plodding direction of the story, I laughed from time-to-time." Chris Nashawaty of Entertainment Weekly gave the film a C+, saying "You realize what it must be like to be trapped in detention with a bunch of 15-year-old boys who think there's nothing more hilarious than repeating the same jokes about porn, pot, and pulling your pud over and over again. It's funny, until it's not." Bill Goodykoontz of The Arizona Republic gave the film two out of five stars, saying "The film, like most of MacFarlane's work, is a mix of occasional laugh-out-loud moments - there are some here - and cringe-worthy misfires that play a lot more tone-deaf than he seems to intend." Brian Truitt of USA Today gave the film two out of four stars, saying "MacFarlane and co-writers Alec Sulkin and Wellesley Wild have a gift for referential riffs, but the plot is the thinnest of narratives just to connect all the comedy bits." Stephen Whitty of the Newark Star-Ledger gave the film one and a half stars out of four, saying "Sure, MacFarlane can write simple jokes as long as the 'f' key on his laptop holds out. Some of them are even funny. But a lot of them don't pay off, and most trod the same well-worn territory -- potheads, practical jokes, politically incorrect cliches." Lindsey Bahr of the Associated Press gave the film a negative review, saying "In an admirable effort to go a different route, MacFarlane has instead done something hopelessly bizarre: He's given his film too much sincerity and story, and it practically crushes whatever fun does exist."

Mick LaSalle of the San Francisco Chronicle gave the film three out of four stars, saying "MacFarlane is cynical, but he's not a cynic, and there are moments in Ted 2 where you can sense a longing for the gentler and more upbeat entertainment of an earlier generation." Soren Anderson of The Seattle Times gave the film two out of four stars, saying "In the midst of comedy, seriousness. The combination feels forced. A more disciplined and smarter director might have been able to successfully blend the two elements, but crude dude MacFarlane hasn't the skill to bring it off." Dan Callahan of The Wrap gave the film a negative review, saying "Bad taste needs to be more honest and more all-inclusive if it's to make a lasting impression, and MacFarlane's bad taste here is both too wishy-washy and too knee-jerk cruel to really make any impact." Manohla Dargis of The New York Times gave the film a negative review, saying "Mr. MacFarlane can be funny, but Ted 2 is insultingly lazy hack work that is worth discussing primarily because of how he tries and fails to turn race, and specifically black men, into comedy fodder." Jacob Hall of New York Daily News gave the film one out of five stars, saying "Once again, you will believe that a talking CGI stuffed animal can be a racist, hateful monster with no redeeming qualities ... but his greatest sin is that he's not funny." Peter Howell of the Toronto Star gave the film two out of four stars, saying "If you didn't see and laugh at the first Ted, and maybe also at MacFarlane's button-pushing TV series Family Guy, then another movie deserves your entertainment dollars." A.A. Dowd of The A.V. Club gave the film a C+, saying "Ted 2 strikes a sometimes-awkward balance between sincerity and cheap provocation. It also forgets that the real draw of the first film wasn't Ted himself, but Wahlberg, whose sweet-lug routine scored a lot of belly laughs."

=== Accolades ===
Award	Date of ceremony	Category	Recipient(s)	Result	Ref.
AACTA Awards	9 December 2015	Best Visual Effects or Animation	Glenn Melenhorst; Ineke Majoor	Nominated	
People's Choice Awards	January 6, 2016	Favorite Comedic Movie		Nominated	
MTV Movie Awards	April 10, 2016	Best Virtual Performance	Seth MacFarlane	Nominated	
Saturn Awards	June 22, 2016	Best Fantasy Film		Nominated	

== Future ==
=== Possible sequel ===
In June 2015, Collider asked if the studio was already planning a third film; MacFarlane replied: "It's all based on appetite. If Ted 2 does as well as the first one, it means people want to see more of these characters. If that happens, then there would likely be a Ted 3. The franchise, to me, is one that's more character-based than premise-based. If you look at it like episodes in television, if you have characters that people like and they want to see them, again and again, you can tell any number of different stories. If there's a desire for it, then yeah, we would do a Ted 3."

On October 27, 2015, during an interview on Today MacFarlane, again, did not rule out the possibility of Ted 3, stating: "We don't know, I like to kind of have some space between Ted [films], so it's possible there will be another one but there are no immediate plans."

For the Ted television series in 2024, MacFarlane originally asked Mark Wahlberg to reprise his role as John, but due to being occupied with other projects, the show became a prequel to the film series.

In August 2026, Mark Wahlberg teased a third film, stating "You know, Seth McFarlane does Family Guy and all that stuff. He's the creator of Ted. So, we may come back with a third. Yes, we may come back."

=== Television series ===
Teaser trailer for Ted: The Animated Series

On September 13, 2021, MacFarlane posted an image on Instagram of the Ted stuffed bear, writing "The original Ted stuffy mentally preparing for his return."

In April 2022, it was announced that a prequel series was in development for Peacock, with writers Paul Corrigan and Brad Walsh joining MacFarlane as the series' showrunners. MacFarlane reprised his role as the title character. The series was released on January 11, 2024. The second season premiered on March 5, 2026. An animated television series starring MacFarlane and Wahlberg was announced in September 2026, with Seyfried and Barth also reprising their roles and Alanna Ubach and Scott Grimes reprising their roles from the prequel series. It will premiere on December 17, 2026.
