= Ted (film) =

2012 film by Seth MacFarlane

- Theatrical release poster
- Directed by: Seth MacFarlane
- Screenplay by: Seth MacFarlane; Alec Sulkin; Wellesley Wild
- Story by: Seth MacFarlane
- Produced by: Scott Stuber; Seth MacFarlane; John Jacobs; Jason Clark
- Starring: Mark Wahlberg; Mila Kunis; Seth MacFarlane; Joel McHale; Giovanni Ribisi
- Cinematography: Michael Barrett
- Edited by: Jeff Freeman
- Music by: Walter Murphy
- Production companies: Media Rights Capital; Fuzzy Door Productions; Bluegrass Films; Smart Entertainment
- Distributed by: Universal Pictures
- Release dates: June 21, 2012 (Grauman's Chinese Theatre); June 29, 2012 (United States)
- Running time: 106 minutes
- Country: United States
- Language: English
- Budget: $50–65 million
- Box office: $549 million

Ted (stylized in all lowercase) is a 2012 American fantasy stoner comedy film directed and co-produced by Seth MacFarlane and written by MacFarlane, Alec Sulkin, and Wellesley Wild based on a story written by MacFarlane. The first installment in the Ted franchise, the film stars Mark Wahlberg and Mila Kunis, with Joel McHale and Giovanni Ribisi in supporting roles, and MacFarlane providing the voice and motion capture of the title character. The story follows John Bennett, a Boston native whose childhood wish brings his teddy bear friend Ted to life. However, in adulthood, their friendship begins to interfere with the progression of John's work life and his relationship with his girlfriend, Lori Collins.

The feature directorial debut of MacFarlane, the film premiered at the Grauman's Chinese Theatre on June 21, 2012, and was theatrically released in the United States on June 29 by Universal Pictures. It received positive reviews from critics and was a commercial success, grossing $549 million worldwide. Ted was the highest-grossing comedy film of the year and was nominated for the Academy Award for Best Original Song. The film also successfully launched a franchise, with a sequel released in 2015, a prequel television series released from 2024 to 2026, and a 2026 animated sequel series.

== Plot ==
In 1985, 8-year-old John Bennett is a friendless only child living in Norwood, Massachusetts. On Christmas Day, he wishes for his new gift, a jumbo teddy bear named Ted, to come to life and become his friend. The wish coincides with a shooting star and comes true; word spreads, and Ted briefly becomes a celebrity.

In 2012, the now 35-year-old John and Ted are still living together in an apartment in Boston with John's girlfriend Lori Collins, and are staunch companions enjoying a hedonistic life. As the couple's fourth anniversary approaches, Lori hopes to marry John, but feels he cannot move forward in life with Ted around. He is hesitant about making Ted leave, but is persuaded to act when they find Ted at home with a group of prostitutes, including one who defecated on the floor, while they were out for their anniversary dinner.

John finds Ted his own apartment and a job at a grocery store, where he begins dating his co-worker, Tami-Lynn. Lori learns that John has been skipping work, using her as an excuse, to spend most of his time with Ted. John and Lori are invited to a party put on by Lori's womanizing manager Rex, but Ted lures John away to a party at his apartment with the offer to meet Sam J. Jones, the star of their favorite film, Flash Gordon.

Intending to stay only for a few minutes, John gets caught up in the occasion. Lori finds John there and kicks him out of their apartment, breaking up with him. Devastated and furious, he blames Ted for ruining his life and ends their friendship.

Ted then goes to John's hotel room to inform him that Lori and Rex are attending a Norah Jones concert on a date together. Their conversation becomes an argument and then a violent brawl, but they reconcile. To repair John's relationship with Lori, Ted arranges for Norah Jones, an old lover of his, to help by having John express his love for Lori with a song during Norah's concert.

John does an off-key rendition of "All Time High", the theme song of Octopussy, which he and Lori watched on their first date. He is booed off stage, though the attempt touches Lori. She returns to her apartment, where Ted confesses to his role in John's relapse and offers to leave them alone forever if she talks to John, to which Lori agrees.

After Lori leaves, however, Ted is kidnapped by Donny, an obsessive stalker who has idolized him since he was a child. Donny plans to make Ted into his son Robert's new toy. Ted obtains a phone to contact John, but is recaptured.

Realizing Ted is in danger, John and Lori locate Donny's residence and track him. They chase them to Fenway Park, where Donny rips Ted in half. Two police cars arrive, forcing Donny to flee the scene. John and Lori gather Ted's stuffing, and Ted relays his wish for John to be happy with Lori before the magic in Ted fades away, making him a normal teddy bear again.

Unable to accept his death, John and Lori unsuccessfully attempt to repair Ted. Saddened by the incident, Lori makes a wish upon a shooting star. The following day, Ted is magically restored due to the wish and reunites with John and Lori. John finally proposes to her, and she accepts. Sometime later, John and Lori get married (with Sam Jones as the presiding minister).

In the film's epilogue, the narrator says that Ted comfortably accepted having a life of his own, as he and Tami-Lynn continued their love affair; Sam Jones attempts to restart his film career and moves into a studio apartment with Brandon Routh; Rex gives up his pursuit of Lori, goes into a deep depression, and dies of Lou Gehrig's disease; Donny gets arrested by the Boston Police Department for kidnapping Ted, but the charges are dropped, due to the situation sounding ridiculous. Robert hires a personal trainer, loses a significant amount of weight, and goes on to become Taylor Lautner.

== Cast ==
- Mark Wahlberg as John Bennett, Ted's best friend who, as a child, wished he would come to life. An immature but mild-mannered slacker who loves to smoke pot with his best friend.
  - Colton Shires as teenage John Bennett
  - Bretton Manley as young John Bennett
- Seth MacFarlane as Ted (voice and motion capture), John's teddy bear and best friend. John wished him to life when he was a kid, and the two have remained friends ever since. Ted grows up to be a crude, foul-mouthed, alcoholic teddy bear, but he is also a lovable cheeky-chappy and is highly protective of John.
  - Zane Cowans as young Ted's voice.
  - Tara Strong (uncredited) as Ted's "I Love You" function
- Mila Kunis as Lori Collins, John's girlfriend who believes Ted is hindering her and John's relationship.
- Joel McHale as Rex, Lori's womanizing manager at her job and John's romantic nemesis
- Giovanni Ribisi as Donny, Ted's biggest fan and stalker
- Aedin Mincks as Robert, Donny's brutish son
- Patrick Warburton as Guy, John's co-worker
- Laura Vandervoort as Tanya, John's co-worker
- Matt Walsh as Thomas Murphy, John's boss
- Jessica Barth as Tami-Lynn McCafferty, Ted's girlfriend and co-worker
- Bill Smitrovich as Frank Stevens, Ted's boss
- Alex Borstein as Helen Bennett, John's mother
- Ralph Garman as Steve Bennett, John's father
- Jessica Stroup as Tracy, Lori's co-worker
- Ginger Gonzaga as Gina, Lori's co-worker
- Sam J. Jones as himself
- Ryan Reynolds (uncredited) as Jared, Guy's boyfriend
- Norah Jones as herself
- Tom Skerritt as himself
- Mike Henry as a Southern newscaster
- Robert Wu as Quan Ming / Ming the Merciless
- Ted Danson (uncredited) as himself
- Patrick Stewart as the Narrator
- Shawn Thornton as the enraged audience member

== Production ==
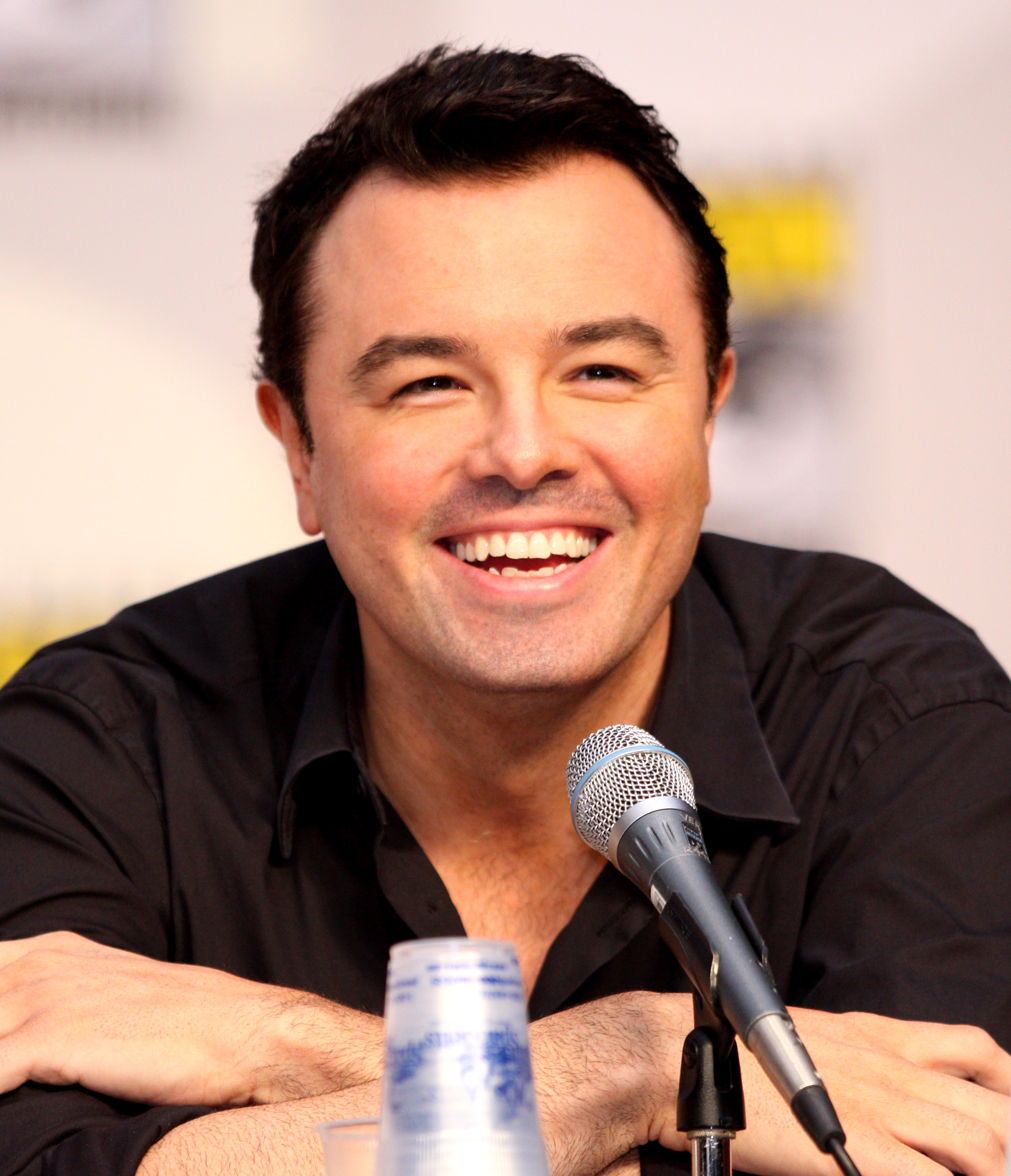
Seth MacFarlane co-wrote, co-produced, and directed the film, and provided the motion capture and the voice for the title character.

This film serves as the feature directorial debut of Seth MacFarlane, his first time as director in any capacity. Compared to most of his other work, such as Family Guy, American Dad!, and The Cleveland Show, this film is a live-action effort, with computer animation handled by visual effects facilities Tippett Studio and Iloura. MacFarlane wrote the screenplay with his Family Guy colleagues Alec Sulkin and Wellesley Wild based on a story idea written by MacFarlane himself. MacFarlane originally wanted to make Ted into an animated television show, much like his previous works, and later revealed in an interview with TheWrap ahead of the release of the prequel series in 2024 that he had pitched the idea as a family-oriented series during his time working at Hanna-Barbera, wherein Ted would be what MacFarlane described as a "leech on the family" as the boy went on to grow up, go to college and start said family. While MacFarlane himself admitted he "never did anything with" the original incarnation of the project, he came back to it when considering ideas for his first feature film, realizing it "seemed like an idea that had some legs... and since it was a movie instead of a TV show and an ongoing group of characters, it seemed like telling a love story from start to finish and using that framework was maybe a better way to go. So the dad became a single guy trying to get his relationship back together".

Originally, 20th Century Fox was offered to finance and distribute the film, given their production partnership with Family Guy, American Dad!, and The Cleveland Show, all created by MacFarlane. However, MacFarlane wanted a budget of $65 million for the film, which Fox considered to be too high for an R-rated comedy film, let alone one from a first-time director, and was skeptical about the film's future success. They also wanted it to be rated PG-13 instead of R, which MacFarlane, Sulkin, and Wild ended up writing a version of. However, despite this, Fox backed out, and MacFarlane began to take the project elsewhere. MacFarlane later set up the project at Media Rights Capital, and on April 12, 2010, Universal Pictures announced that it had acquired the full rights to Ted after it agreed to the $65 million budget he requested and to direct the R-rated version of the script.

On October 26, 2010, Mark Wahlberg joined the project as the lead actor opposite MacFarlane; Matt Damon in 2026 said he had been offered the role, but declined. Two months later, on December 14, Mila Kunis, MacFarlane's Family Guy co-star, also joined the cast; it is Wahlberg and Kunis' second collaboration following 2008's Max Payne. On February 23, 2011, Giovanni Ribisi signed on to the film to play the film's villain. Filming began in May 2011 in Boston, Norwood and other locations in Massachusetts.

The film was scheduled for release in the United States on July 13, 2012, but it was moved up to June 29, both to avoid competition with Ice Age: Continental Drift and following the delay of G.I. Joe: Retaliation. Internationally, the film was released in Australia on July 5, 2012, and on August 1, 2012, in the United Kingdom and Ireland.

== Soundtrack ==
The film's soundtrack was released by Universal Republic Records on June 26, 2012. It features the score by Walter Murphy and songs by various artists such as Norah Jones and Queen. Seth MacFarlane co-wrote the opening theme "Everybody Needs a Best Friend" with Murphy. The song was later nominated for the Academy Award for Best Original Song at the 85th Academy Awards.

== Marketing ==
To promote the film, Universal Pictures teamed up with Axe in a marketing campaign that involved the title character and the brand's hair care product Axe Hair. In one commercial, Ted takes a woman on a date to a fancy restaurant, where he brings her to orgasm under the table before handing another man a box of Axe Hair gel.

To promote the film in Japan, United International Pictures teamed up with Spike Chunsoft in a marketing campaign that involved the title character and Danganronpa bear mascot Monokuma.

In February 2013, Wahlberg and MacFarlane (as Ted) made an appearance at the 85th Academy Awards, which MacFarlane himself hosted.

== Release ==
=== Box office ===
Ted grossed $218.8 million in North America and $330.6 million overseas for a total gross of $549.4 million, against a budget of $50 million. It was Universal's highest-grossing film in 2012, ahead of Snow White and the Huntsman and Battleship (the only one to pass $400 million), and the 12th-highest-grossing film of 2012.

==== Asia ====
Ted debuted in first place in Taiwan and got the best comedy opening ever there. It also debuted in Hong Kong, with $1.4 million, and grossed $571,000 in its first week in South Korea, eventually grossing $8 million, $3.8 million and $1.8 million respectively. It also grossed $2.1 million in both Indonesia and Singapore, and $1.4 million in Thailand.

In January 2013, the film opened at number one in Japan, its final market, with $4.5 million, the best start ever for an R-rated comedy there. In comparison, it grossed more in its opening weekend than The Hangover Part II made in its entire run. The following weekend, it retained the number one spot for the second consecutive frame, grossing $3.6 million at 137 dates, for a 10-day market cumulative total of $11.2 million. By its third weekend, the film stayed at the number one spot for a third week, with earning down less than 10%, pushing Ted's overseas total past the $300 million mark, and making it the top grossing R-rated comedy of all time in Japan. It then had its fourth consecutive weekend at number one, drawing another $3 million at 354 locations in the country. Its cumulative total stands at $44 million grossed.

==== Europe ====
Ted debuted with $14.3 million in the United Kingdom, making it the third-best debut ever for a Universal film behind Bridget Jones: The Edge of Reason and King Kong, eventually grossing over $48.9 million in the country. Ted was released in cinemas across the United Kingdom on August 3.

The film had a $7.4 million launch in Germany, holding #1 spot for three-straight weeks, eventually grossing over $31.4 million.

In Spain, it opened with $2.3 million, which is the highest ever for an original R-rated comedy there, eventually grossing over $14.3 million.

The film also had the best Hollywood comedy debut ever in Russia, grossing $5.5 million, eventually grossing $17 million.

Ted spent its first four weeks atop the weekend box office in both the Netherlands, and Austria, eventually grossing $8.4 million, and $6.2 million in those countries respectively. The movie also opened at number one in Belgium, with $587,000, eventually grossing $4.4 million.

In Italy, the film had a second place start, grossing $3.3 million in its opening weekend there, moving up to number one on its second week, with $4.2 million grossed. It has since grossed $14.1 million there.

In France, the film debuted at number two, grossing $3 million in 348 theatres during its opening weekend, eventually grossing $11.5 million in the country.

==== North America ====
Ted earned $2.6 million in midnight showings in the United States and Canada. For its opening day, Ted scored one of the best R-rated comedy debuts ever since The Hangover with an estimated $20.2 million. The film earned a total of $54.4 million in its opening weekend, well over second-place R-rated Magic Mike's $39.2 million. Its overall weekend gross set a record for the highest original R-rated comedy opening in history. It was the first time two R-rated films grossed more than $21 million each during a weekend. Overall, Ted had the eighth-highest opening weekend for any R-rated film, behind The Matrix Reloaded, The Hangover Part II, The Passion of the Christ, 300, Hannibal and Watchmen.

In Mexico, the film debuted in first place with $2.1 million, grossing $13.4 million.

==== Oceania ====
Ted also debuted at number one in Australia and New Zealand, grossing over $35.5 million and $3.5 million respectively. Its $13.1 million opening in Australia, of which $4.5 million were from previews, was Universal's biggest opening ever in the country. In Australia, Ted was rated MA 15+, whereas in New Zealand, it was rated R13 for its theatrical release and R16 for the extended DVD/Blu-ray release.

South America

In Brazil, the film opened with $1.4 million at 273 sites, moving up to 1st place in the country on its third week of release. It has since grossed $8.8 million there.

The film also grossed $4.6 million in Argentina, 2 million in Chile, 1.9 million in Peru, and 1.7 million in Colombia.

=== Critical reception ===
Most of the reviews Ted received were positive. On the review aggregator website Rotten Tomatoes, 68% of 219 critics' reviews are positive, with an average rating of 6.40/10. The website's consensus reads: "Ted's 'romance versus bromance' plot is familiar, but the film's held aloft by the high-concept central premise and a very funny (albeit inconsistent) script." On Metacritic, the film has an average score of 62 out of 100 based on 37 critics, indicating "generally favorable reviews". Audiences polled by CinemaScore gave the film an average grade of "A−" on an A+ to F scale.

Roger Ebert gave the film three-and-a-half stars out of four, citing the film as "the best comedy screenplay so far [this year]," also praising the film on the fact that it "doesn't run out of steam." Nathan Rabin of The A.V. Club gave the film a "B" grade. On the other hand, A.O. Scott of The New York Times called Ted "boring, lazy and wildly unoriginal."

Director Paul Thomas Anderson has stated that he is a big fan of the film, calling it great and also putting it on his favorite films of the 21st century list.

=== Accolades ===
List of awards and nominations
Award / Film Festival	Category	Recipients	Result	Ref.
Teen Choice Award (2012)	Choice Summer Movie: Comedy	Ted	Nominated	
Teen Choice Award (2012)	Choice Movie: Voice	Seth MacFarlane as Ted	Nominated	
Teen Choice Award (2012)	Choice Movie: Chemistry	Seth MacFarlane and Mark Wahlberg	Nominated	
International Film Music Critics Association Award (2012)	Best Original Score for a Comedy Film	Walter Murphy	Won	
Phoenix Film Critics Society Award (2012)	Breakthrough Performance Behind the Camera	Seth MacFarlane	Nominated	
Jupiter Award (2012)	Best International Film	Seth MacFarlane	Won	
St. Louis Gateway Film Critics Association Award (2012)	Best Comedy	Ted	Won	
People's Choice Award (39th)	Favorite Comedy Movie	Ted	Won	
People's Choice Award (39th)	Favorite Movie Actress	Mila Kunis	Nominated	
People's Choice Award (39th)	Favorite Comedic Movie Actress	Mila Kunis	Nominated	
Critics' Choice Movie Award (18th)	Best Comedy	Ted	Nominated	
Critics' Choice Movie Award (18th)	Best Actor in a Comedy	Mark Wahlberg	Nominated	
Critics' Choice Movie Award (18th)	Best Actress in a Comedy	Mila Kunis	Nominated	
American Cinema Editor Award (2012)	Best Edited Feature Film – Comedy or Musical	Jeff Freeman	Nominated	
Georgia Film Critics Association Award (2013)	Best Original Song	"Everybody Needs a Best Friend" — Seth MacFarlane and Walter Murphy	Nominated	
Academy Award (85th)	Best Original Song	"Everybody Needs a Best Friend" — Seth MacFarlane and Walter Murphy	Nominated	
Empire Award (18th)	Best Comedy	Ted	Won	
MTV Movie Award (2013)	Movie of the Year	Ted	Nominated	
MTV Movie Award (2013)	Best Female Performance	Mila Kunis	Nominated	
MTV Movie Award (2013)	Best Shirtless Performance	Seth MacFarlane	Nominated	
MTV Movie Award (2013)	Best Kiss	Mila Kunis and Mark Wahlberg	Nominated	
MTV Movie Award (2013)	Best Fight	Seth MacFarlane and Mark Wahlberg	Nominated	
MTV Movie Award (2013)	Best On-Screen Duo	Seth MacFarlane and Mark Wahlberg	Won	
MTV Movie Award (2013)	Best WTF Moment	Seth MacFarlane	Nominated	
Saturn Award (39th)	Best Fantasy Film	Ted	Nominated	
ASCAP Award (2013)	Top Box Office Films	Seth MacFarlane and Walter Murphy	Won	
Spike Guy's Choice Award (2012/2013)	Guy Movie of the Year	Ted	Won	
Spike Guy's Choice Award (2012/2013)	Best Fight Scene	Mark Wahlberg	Won	

=== Home media ===
The film was released on DVD and Blu-ray in the United States on December 11, 2012, by Universal Studios Home Entertainment. Both formats featured an unrated version of the film (112 minutes) and were also released in Australia on November 21, 2012, in an "Extended Edition". It was released on DVD and Blu-ray in the United Kingdom on November 26, 2012.

On May 3, 2016, Ted vs. Flash Gordon: The Ultimate Collection was released on Blu-ray plus Digital HD, featuring Flash Gordon and the unrated versions of Ted and Ted 2.

Ted was released on 4K Ultra HD Blu-ray as a collector's edition on December 10, 2024, by Shout! Factory.

In Brazil, the movie was the target of a complaint from a member of the PCDB party, who denounced the film for promoting drug use and requested its suspension, calling it absurd.

== Future ==
=== Sequel ===
During the 2012 American Dad! Comic-Con panel, MacFarlane stated that he would be open to a sequel to Ted. In September 2012, chief executive Steve Burke said that the studio would be looking to make a sequel to Ted "as soon as possible".

On Anderson Live, Wahlberg confirmed that a sequel was in the works and that it would be the first sequel in his career, while also revealing that he and Ted (as voiced by MacFarlane) would appear at the 85th Academy Awards.

In February 2014, Deadline reported that Amanda Seyfried had been cast as the female lead, and that Kunis would not return. On July 8, MacFarlane announced that work had officially begun on the sequel. Ted 2 was released in the United States on June 26, 2015. It was neither critically nor financially as successful, though it still turned a profit, grossing $215.9 million on a $68 million budget.

=== Subsequent television spin-offs ===
==== Prequel television series ====
In June 2021, it was announced that a live-action prequel television series of the film had been ordered at Peacock. It is a co-production between Universal Content Productions, Fuzzy Door Productions and MRC Television with MacFarlane and Erica Huggins as executive producers. The series centers on John and Ted as teenagers in 1993. In April 2022, it was announced that Giorgia Whigham, Max Burkholder and Scott Grimes were cast as series regulars, in addition to MacFarlane reprising the voice of Ted. In May 2022, Alanna Ubach joined the cast as a series regular. The series premiered on January 11, 2024. A second season of the series was announced in May 2024, after the first season premiered as Peacock's most-watched original title. The second season wrapped filming on January 23, 2025. In March 2026, it was announced that McFarlene was ending the show after two seasons due to the high production costs required to continue the series.

==== Animated sequel series ====
In May 2025, it was announced that an animated television series was in the works at Peacock, with MacFarlane, Wahlberg, Seyfried and Barth reprising their roles from the films. MacFarlane would also be as writer and executive producing, with Paul Corrigan and Brad Walsh serving as writers, executive producers, and showrunners. Corrigan and Walsh are also showrunners on the prequel series. The series is also a co-production between MacFarlane's Fuzzy Door Productions and MRC Television. It is set to premiere in December 2026.

== See also ==
- Stoner films
