= Walter Murphy =

American composer (born 1952)

- Born: Walter Anthony Murphy Jr. December 19, 1952 (age 73); New York City, New York, U.S.
- Genres: Film score; big band; swing; classical; disco; funk; jazz; pop
- Occupations: Keyboardist; arranger; songwriter; record producer
- Instrument: Keyboards
- Years active: 1970–present
- Labels: Amour; Major; Private Stock; RSO; TK; RCA; MCA; Geffen
- Website: www.waltermurphy.com

Walter Anthony Murphy Jr. (born December 19, 1952) is an American composer, keyboardist, songwriter, and record producer. He is best known for the instrumental "A Fifth of Beethoven", a disco adaptation of Beethoven's Fifth Symphony which topped the charts in 1976 and was featured on the Saturday Night Fever soundtrack in 1977. Further classical-disco fusions followed, such as "Flight '76", "Toccata and Funk in 'D' Minor" "Bolero", and "Mostly Mozart", but were not as successful.

In a career spanning over five decades, Murphy has written music for numerous films and TV shows, including The Tonight Show Starring Johnny Carson, The Savage Bees, Stingray, Wiseguy, The Commish, Profit, Buffy the Vampire Slayer, Looney Tunes, and How Murray Saved Christmas. He has had a long-running partnership with Seth MacFarlane, composing music for his films and TV shows such as Family Guy, American Dad, The Cleveland Show, Ted, Ted 2 and the Ted television series.

== Early life ==
Murphy was born on December 19, 1952, in New York City, and grew up in Manhattan. At age four, he attended music lessons hosted by Rosa Rio, studying an array of instruments, including the organ and piano. Rio frequently opted for him to star in television advertisements for the Hammond organ. In high school, Murphy composed for his band class and orchestra.

Against the wishes of his father, who was a real estate agent and wished to pass the business down to his son, Murphy enrolled in the Manhattan School of Music under a composition major in 1970. recalling his experiences with his father, Murphy stated "He wanted me to be a doctor or lawyer — or something you can depend on." There, Murphy studied jazz and classical piano with Nicolas Flagello and Ludmila Ulehla. His postgraduate studies at the Manhattan School yielded the composition "Chorale and Allegro for Orchestra", which has been performed by orchestras throughout the United States.

== Career ==
=== 1970–1976: Early years ===
From 1970 to 1980, Murphy worked as a Manhattan Avenue jingle writer, writing for such clients as Lady Arrow shirts, Revlon, Woolworth's, Viasa Airlines, and Korvette's, as well as arrangements for the popular children's television series Big Blue Marble.

In the early 1970s, Murphy was the leader of the soul/R&B cover band WAM. They gigged in the New York tri-state area, often at the New Rochelle club Pearly's.

During an appointment with Bobby Rosengarden, bandleader of the Dick Cavett Show orchestra, Murphy convinced the group to play some of his arrangements when he found Rosengarden to be absent. Looking back on the situation, he stated "I still can't believe I did it. I'm not a very forward person." Since the band "wasn't very busy," they performed his arrangements live and enjoyed them, convincing Murphy to write more.

In April 1972, a fellow student from the Manhattan School of Music introduced Murphy to Doc Severinsen, musical director of The Tonight Show Starring Johnny Carson. Murphy presented his arrangements to Severinsen, who liked them enough to have The Tonight Show Band play them live. However, The Tonight Show moved production to Burbank, California a month later, and a final year of college prevented Murphy from joining them.

In 1974, Murphy joined Thomas J. Valentino's company Valentino, Inc., composing much of their library music for film and television over the years.

In 1976, Murphy played piano on Peter Lemongello's second album Do I Love You.

=== 1976–1979: Private Stock years, breakthrough ===
In college, Murphy's interests had included rock music, particularly that which was adapted from classical music, such as "Joy" by Apollo 100 and "A Lover's Concerto" by The Toys. Later, in 1976, he was writing a disco song for a commercial, when a producer gave him the idea of "updating classical music," which "nobody had done lately." He then recorded a demo tape of four songs: three were ordinary pop songs, while the fourth was a disco rendition of Beethoven's Fifth Symphony titled "A Fifth of Beethoven"—and mailed it to various record labels in New York City. Response was generally unimpressive, but "Fifth" caught the interest of Private Stock Records owner Larry Uttal.

Murphy signed on to Private Stock and recorded the album A Fifth of Beethoven. The first single and title track, "A Fifth of Beethoven", was released on May 29, 1976. It was a hit, starting out at number 80 on the Billboard Hot 100 and eventually reaching number 1 within 19 weeks, where it stayed for one week. In Canada it was number 1 for 2 weeks. The single sold two million copies, while the album sold about 750,000 copies. The second single, a rendition of Nikolai Rimsky-Korsakov's "Flight of the Bumblebee" titled "Flight '76", was less successful, reaching only number 44 on the Hot 100 and number 35 in Canada.

The single was initially credited to "Walter Murphy & The Big Apple Band" upon encouragement from Private Stock, who believed it would become a hit if credited to a group rather than an individual. However, two days following the record's release, Private Stock discovered the existence of another Big Apple Band (which promptly changed its name to Chic). As result, the record was later re-released and credited to "The Walter Murphy Band", then just "Walter Murphy".

Following the success of "A Fifth of Beethoven", Murphy toured with his band and made guest appearances on shows such as Don Kirshner's Rock Concert, The Midnight Special, Dinah!, and American Bandstand. On the success of the single, he said: "It's really sad that the kids today can only relate to Beethoven via a rock version of his music." He hoped "that maybe if they've heard this much of his symphony, they'll go out and buy the original."

In 1977, "A Fifth of Beethoven" was licensed to RSO Records for inclusion on the soundtrack to the film Saturday Night Fever, giving the song a new lease on life. Also that year, Murphy recorded the album Rhapsody in Blue, which contained a similar mix of classical-disco fusion and self-penned pop songs. Two singles were released: a disco treatment of George Gershwin's "Rhapsody in Blue", and the self-penned instrumental "Uptown Serenade." The former narrowly missed the top 100, but received significant play on easy-listening stations, according to Billboard. (In 2019, it was employed in the opening mise-en-scène of episode 8 of the HBO Watchmen series, set in an alternate-historical Saigon on the anniversary of the American victory in the Vietnam War.)

In 1978, Murphy recorded the album Phantom of the Opera, a concept album telling the story of The Phantom of the Opera, featuring Gene Pistilli as Erik/The Phantom, B.G. Gibson as Raoul, and Renée Geyer as Christine. The album spawned three singles: "Dance Your Face Off"/"Gentle Explosion" (a double A-side), "Toccata and Funk in 'D' Minor", and "The Music Will Not End". These singles failed to make the Hot 100, club, or radio charts.

=== 1979–1982: RCA and MCA years, Uncle Louie ===
Murphy signed on to RCA in 1979, and released the album Walter Murphy's Discosymphony. The album spawned the singles "Bolero" and "Mostly Mozart"; the latter failed to chart, indicating that Murphy had taken the "classical disco" concept as far as it could go.

Also in 1979, Murphy and Gene Pistilli joined with brothers Eddie and Frank Dillard, forming the band Uncle Louie. They signed on to TK Records and released one album, Uncle Louie's Here, which explored a more aggressive, funk-based angle than Murphy's solo albums. The album spawned three singles: "Full-Tilt Boogie", which reached number 19 on the Billboard R&B chart, "I Like Funky Music", and "Sky High".

Around this time, Murphy and Pistilli wrote and/or produced songs for other artists, including "Something to Hold Onto" (1981) by Harry Belafonte and "What's Wrong With This Picture?" (1980) by Lora Lee Cliff. Murphy also contributed arrangements to Jack Jones's Nobody Does It Better (1979) and Pia Zadora's Rock It Out (1984).

In 1982, Murphy signed on to MCA Records and recorded Themes from E.T. the Extra-Terrestrial and More. The album contained disco- and pop-tinged arrangements of themes to popular movies of the time, such as E.T. the Extra-Terrestrial, Indiana Jones, and Poltergeist. The album spawned one single, a medley of "Themes from ET (The Extra-Terrestrial)", which climbed to number 47 on the Billboard Hot 100.

=== 1982–1999: Move to behind-the-scenes roles ===
Following Themes from E.T., Murphy largely ceased touring and recording studio albums of original material. He instead began focusing more exclusively on composing for film and television, and producing for other artists, in a more behind-the-scenes role.

Artists that Murphy has recorded and/or produced for include Dolly Parton, Sylvester Stallone, Jennifer Warnes, Siedah Garrett, Tim Schmitt, Richie Havens, Isaac Hayes, Taj Mahal, Paul Williams, and Kenny Rankin. He was also a guest conductor for the Dallas Symphony Orchestra, during their successful Summer Pops series.

In 1984, Murphy and television composer Mike Post co-produced Alabama's "Rock on the Bayou", the B-side to the band's hit single "(There's A) Fire in the Night". "Rock on the Bayou" was featured in the independent film The River Rat, which Post also composed the music for.

In 1985, Murphy collaborated with Post, Rick James, and Issac Hayes on scoring music for The A-Team episode "The Heart of Rock 'N Roll".

In 1997, Murphy composed music for the Norman Lear produced Kids' WB animated show, Channel Umptee-3.

=== 1999-present: Collaborations with Seth MacFarlane ===
Since 1999, Murphy has served as one of the two main composers for the animated series Family Guy, the other being Ron Jones until the 12th season in 2014. He has described his scores for Family Guy as "a combination of [big-band swing and action-orchestral]." The song "You've Got a Lot to See", composed for the episode "Brian Wallows and Peter's Swallows", won the award for Outstanding Music and Lyrics at the 2002 Emmy Awards. In 2005, Murphy scored music for the offshoot album Family Guy: Live in Vegas.

Since 2005, Murphy is one of the composers for MacFarlane's American Dad!, the other two being Joel McNeely and Ron Jones, as well as composing the series' theme song "Good Morning USA".

From 2009 to 2013, Murphy composed music for MacFarlane's series The Cleveland Show, including the main title theme.

In 2012, Murphy scored MacFarlane's film Ted, and received an Academy Award for Best Original Song nomination for co-writing "Everybody Needs a Best Friend" with MacFarlane.

Murphy is also a longtime collaborator with jazz guitarist Thom Rotella, who had played on Murphy's albums A Fifth of Beethoven and Phantom of the Opera and currently performs with his Family Guy orchestra. In 1989, Murphy arranged the song "The Gift" on Rotella's album Home Again. In 2014, Murphy and Rotella wrote and recorded a four-track big band project, inspired by the Wes Montgomery and Verve-era Oliver Nelson records of the 1960s that the two of them had grown up on. The project was recorded in Capitol Studio A with engineer Al Schmitt, and performed by renown Los Angeles session musicians.

== Filmography ==
=== Guest appearances ===
- Don Kirshner's Rock Concert (1976)
- The Midnight Special (1976–77)
- American Bandstand (1976)
- The Mike Douglas Show (1976–77; 1979)
- The Merv Griffin Show (1976–77)
- Dinah! (1976–77)
- Dick Clark's Live Wednesday (1978)
- 21st Annual Grammy Awards (1979)
- Score! The Music of 'Family Guy' (2005)
- Family Guy: Creating the Chaos (2009)
- Seth & Alex's Almost Live Comedy Show (2009)
- 85th Academy Awards (2013)

=== Composer/arranger ===
- The Dick Cavett Show (1972)
- The Tonight Show Starring Johnny Carson (1972)
- Big Blue Marble (1974–83)
- The Savage Bees (1976)
- The Night They Took Miss Beautiful (1976)
- Raw Force (1982)
- The New Leave It to Beaver (1983–89)
- Rhinestone (1984)
- The A-Team (1985)
- Pulsebeat (1985)
- ABC Weekend Special (1985)
- Stingray (1985–87)
- Tricks of the Trade (1988)
- Wiseguy (1988–90)
- The Lady Forgets (1989)
- Hunter (1990–91)
- The Commish (1991–96)
- Crow's Nest (1992)
- Jumpin' Joe (1992)
- Profit (1996–97)
- Buffy the Vampire Slayer (1997)
- Channel Umptee-3 (1997)
- Family Guy (1999–2003; 2005–present)
- Por un beso (2000)
- Changing Hearts (2002)
- Fillmore! (2002)
- Looney Tunes (2003–04)
- The Kennedy Center Honors ("That's Pure Mike Nichols" song, 2003)
- American Dad! (2005–present)
- The Winner (2007)
- Seth MacFarlane's Cavalcade of Cartoon Comedy (2008–09)
- Foodfight! (2012)
- The Cleveland Show (2009–13)
- Ted (2012)
- 85th Academy Awards (2013)
- How Murray Saved Christmas (2014)
- Ted 2 (2015)
- The Late Bloomer (2016)
- Mrs. America (theme song; 2021)
- Ted (TV Series) (2024)
- Never Too Soon (TBA)

=== Orchestrator ===
- Teacher's Pet (2004)
- Mickey's Twice Upon a Christmas (2004)

== Discography ==
=== Albums ===
==== Studio albums ====
Title	Album details
A Fifth of Beethoven (as The Walter Murphy Band)	Released: June 1, 1976 (US); Label: Private Stock; Formats: LP, cassette, digital download, 8-track, CD
Rhapsody in Blue	Released: 1977; Label: Private Stock; Formats: LP, cassette, digital download, 8-track, CD
Phantom of the Opera	Released: August 8, 1978 (US); Label: Private Stock; Formats: LP, cassette, digital download, 8-track
Walter Murphy's Discosymphony	Released: 1979; Label: New York International; Formats: LP, 8-track
Uncle Louie's Here (with Uncle Louie)	Released: 1979; Label: Marlin/TK; Formats: LP, CD, digital download
Themes from E.T. the Extra-Terrestrial and More	Released: 1982; Label: MCA; Formats: LP, cassette
Family Guy: Live in Vegas (as Walter Murphy and His Orchestra)	Released: April 26, 2005; Label: Geffen; Formats: CD, digital download
Ted: Original Motion Picture Soundtrack (with Various Artists)	Released: June 26, 2012; Label: Universal Republic; Formats: CD, digital download
Ted 2: Original Motion Picture Soundtrack (with Various Artists)	Released: June 23, 2015; Label: Universal Republic; Formats: Digital download

==== Compilation albums ====
Title	Album details
The Best of Walter Murphy: A Fifth of Beethoven	Released: 1996; Label: Hot Productions; Formats: CD

=== Singles ===
Title	Year	Album
"Disco Bells"	1975	N/A
"A Fifth of Beethoven"	1976	A Fifth of Beethoven
"Flight '76"	1976	A Fifth of Beethoven
"Rhapsody in Blue"	1977	Rhapsody in Blue
"Uptown Serenade"	1977	Rhapsody in Blue
"Dance Your Face Off"/"Gentle Explosion"	1978	Phantom of the Opera
"Toccata and Funk in 'D' Minor"	1978	Phantom of the Opera
"The Music Will Not End"	1978	Phantom of the Opera
"Mostly Mozart"	1979	Walter Murphy's Discosymphony
"Bolero"	1979	Walter Murphy's Discosymhpony
"Full-Tilt Boogie"	1979	Uncle Louie's Here
"I Like Funky Music"	1979	Uncle Louie's Here
"Sky High"	1979	Uncle Louie's Here
"Themes from E.T. (the Extra-Terrestrial)"	1982	Themes from E.T. the Extra-Terrestrial and More

== Awards and nominations ==
Year	Award	Nominated work	Result
1978	Grammy Award for Album of the Year	Saturday Night Fever	Won
1979	American Music Award for Favorite Soul/R&B Album	Saturday Night Fever	Won
1999	Annie Award for Outstanding Individual Achievement for Music in an Animated Television Production	Family Guy	Nominated
2000	Annie Award for Outstanding Individual Achievement for Music in an Animated Television Production	Family Guy for "Dammit Janet"	Nominated
2002	Primetime Emmy Award for Outstanding Music and Lyrics	Family Guy for "You've Got a Lot to See"	Won
2006	Grammy Award for Best Comedy Album	Family Guy: Live in Vegas	Nominated
2007	Primetime Emmy Award for Outstanding Original Music and Lyrics	Family Guy for "My Drunken Irish Dad"	Nominated
2010	Primetime Emmy Award for Outstanding Original Music and Lyrics	Family Guy for "Down Syndrome Girl"	Nominated
2011	Primetime Emmy Award for Outstanding Music Composition for a Series	Family Guy for "And Then There Were Fewer"	Nominated
2012	ASCAP Award for Most Performed Themes and Underscore		Won
2012	International Film Music Critics Award for Best Original Score for a Comedy Film	Ted	Won
2013	ASCAP Award for Top Box Office Films	Ted	Won
2013	ASCAP Award for Top Television Series	The Cleveland Show	Won
2013	ASCAP Award for Top Television Series	American Dad!	Won
2013	ASCAP Award for Top Television Series	Family Guy	Won
2013	ASCAP Award for Most Performed Themes and Underscore		Won
2013	Georgia Film Critics Association Award for Best Original Song	Ted for "Everybody Needs a Best Friend"	Nominated
2013	Academy Award for Best Original Song	Ted	Nominated

== See also ==
- Saturday Night Fever soundtrack
