= Seth MacFarlane discography =

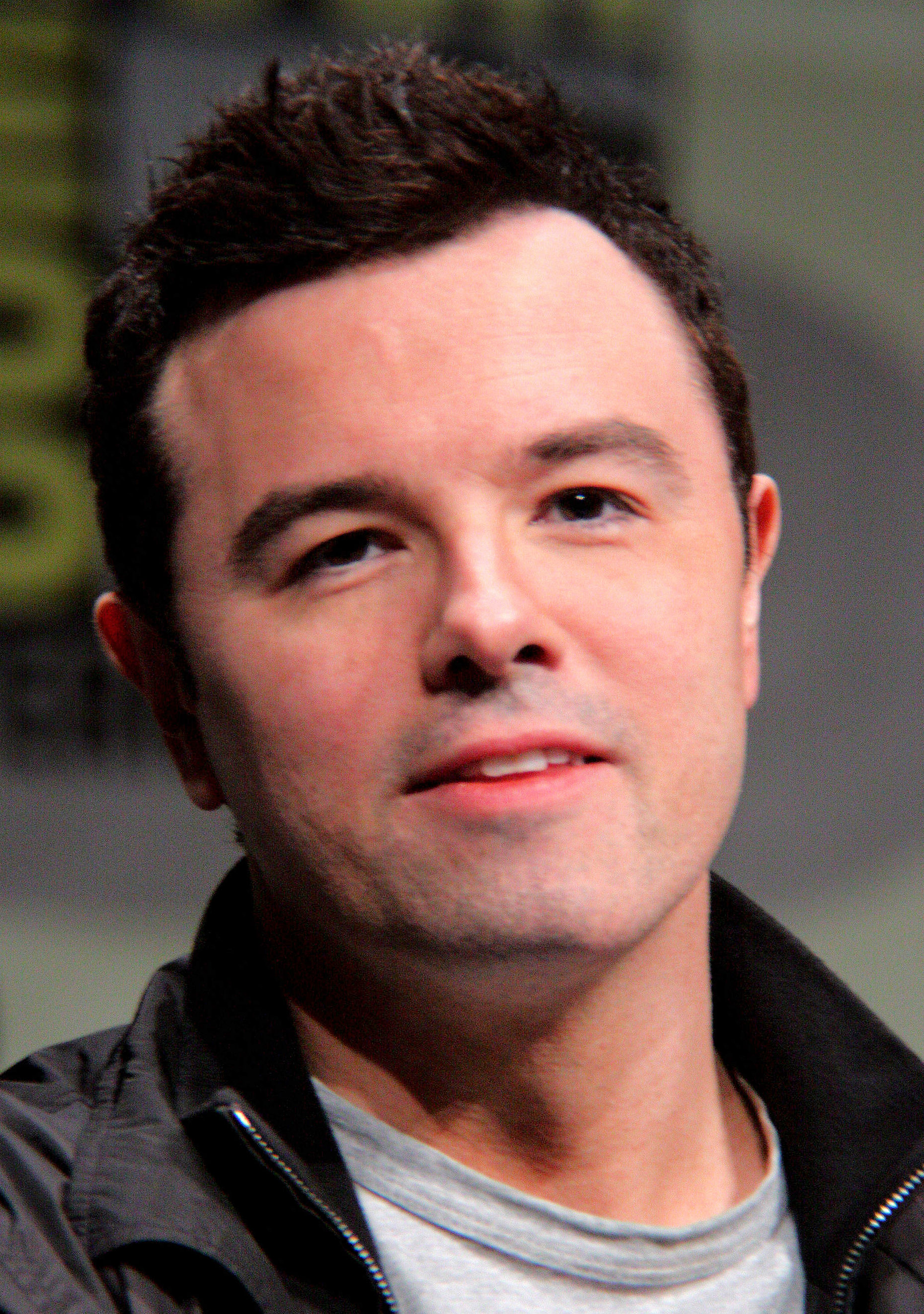
- MacFarlane in 2012
- Studio albums: 10
- EPs: 1
- Soundtrack albums: 1
- Singles: 14
- Other charted songs: 1

The American actor, animator, writer, producer, director, comedian, and singer Seth MacFarlane has released ten studio albums, one extended play, one soundtrack album, and 14 singles (including two as a featured artist). He has also contributed numerous songs to his projects, such as Family Guy, American Dad!, and Ted. In 2005, he served as a producer for the Family Guy soundtrack Live in Vegas, which was nominated for a Grammy Award for Best Comedy Album.

MacFarlane signed a record deal with Universal Republic Records in 2010 and released his debut studio album Music Is Better Than Words in September of the following year. The album received positive reviews and reached 111 on the US Billboard 200 chart; in addition, it received two Grammy nominations for Best Traditional Pop Vocal Album and Best Engineered Album, Non-Classical. In September 2014, MacFarlane released his second studio album, and first Christmas-themed album, Holiday for Swing, which reached 51 on the Billboard 200. MacFarlane released his third studio album, No One Ever Tells You, the following September; the album earned a Grammy nomination for Best Traditional Pop Vocal Album.

In 2016, he made a guest appearance on Encore: Movie Partners Sing Broadway, a studio album by the actress and singer Barbra Streisand; they performed "Pure Imagination" as a duet. A year later, MacFarlane released his fourth studio album, In Full Swing. The album received two nominations at the 60th Annual Grammy Awards for Best Traditional Pop Vocal Album and Best Arrangement, Instrumental and Vocals. His fifth studio album, Once in a While, was released in 2019.

During the COVID-19 pandemic, MacFarlane and the actress and singer Elizabeth Gillies collaborated on eight songs on an extended playlist entitled Songs from Home. He released his sixth studio album, Great Songs from Stage & Screen in August 2020. Like his previous four albums, he recorded a majority of the songs at Abbey Road Studios, but much of the album's post-production work was done at home due to the pandemic. MacFarlane released his seventh studio album, Blue Skies, in May 2022, and MacFarlane and Gillies released their Christmas album We Wish You the Merriest in November 2023. He released his ninth album, Lush Life: The Lost Sinatra Arrangements, on June 6, 2025. His tenth and latest album, Seth MacFarlane Sings the Muppets, was released on September 18, 2026.

== Albums ==
=== Studio albums ===
List of studio albums, with selected chart positions
Title	Details	Peak chart positions				
Title	Details	US	US Jazz	US Trad. Jazz	US Album Sales	US Holiday
Music Is Better Than Words	Release date: September 27, 2011; Label: Universal Republic	111	2	2	111	—
Holiday for Swing	Release date: September 30, 2014; Label: Republic	51	2	2	38	8
No One Ever Tells You	Release date: September 30, 2015; Label: Republic, Fuzzy Door	—	1	1	—	—
In Full Swing	Release date: September 15, 2017; Label: Republic, Verve, Fuzzy Door	—	2	1	—	—
Once in a While	Release date: April 19, 2019; Label: Republic, Verve, Fuzzy Door	—	5	4	—	—
Great Songs from Stage & Screen	Release date: August 28, 2020; Label: Republic, Verve, Fuzzy Door	—	–	—	—	—
Blue Skies	Release date: May 20, 2022; Label: Republic, Verve, Fuzzy Door	—	–	—	—	—
We Wish You the Merriest (with Elizabeth Gillies)	Release date: November 3, 2023; Label: Republic, Verve, Fuzzy Door	—	20	—	—	47
Lush Life: The Lost Sinatra Arrangements	Release date: June 6, 2025; Label: Republic, Verve, Fuzzy Door	—	4	3	17	—
Seth MacFarlane Sings the Muppets	Release date: September 18, 2026; Label: Republic, Verve, Fuzzy Door, Walt Disney	—	13	11	—	—
"—" denotes a recording that did not chart or was not released in that territory.

=== Soundtrack albums ===
List of soundtrack albums, with selected chart positions
Title	Details	Peak chart positions	
Title	Details	US	US Com.
Family Guy: Live in Vegas	Release date: April 26, 2005; Label: Geffen Records	105	2

== Extended plays ==
List of extended plays, with selected details
Title	Extended play details
Songs from Home (with Elizabeth Gillies)	Released: August 20, 2021; Label: Republic, Verve, Fuzzy Door

== Singles ==
=== As main artist ===
List of singles, with selected chart positions
Title	Year	Peaks		Album
Title	Year	US AC	CAN AC	Album
"The Night They Invented Champagne"	2011	—	—	Music Is Better Than Words
"Nine O'Clock"	2011	—	—	Music Is Better Than Words
"I'll Be Home for Christmas"	2014	28	–	Holiday for Swing
"Baby, It's Cold Outside" (featuring Sara Bareilles)	2014	10	10	Holiday for Swing
"That Face"	2017	—	—	In Full Swing
"Almost Like Being in Love"	2017	—	—	In Full Swing
"Have You Met Miss Jones?"	2017	—	—	In Full Swing
"Half as Lovely (Twice as True)"	2019	—	—	Once in a While
"No Moon at All"	2022	—	—	Blue Skies
"We Wish You the Merriest" (with Elizabeth Gillies)	2023	—	—	We Wish You the Merriest
"Sleigh Ride" (with Elizabeth Gillies)	2023	—	—	We Wish You the Merriest
"Lush Life"	2025	—	—	Lush Life: The Lost Sinatra Arrangements
"Give Me the Simple Life"	2025	—	—	Lush Life: The Lost Sinatra Arrangements
"Bein' Green"	2026	—	—	Seth MacFarlane Sings the Muppets
"Happiness Hotel"	2026	—	—	Seth MacFarlane Sings the Muppets
"—" denotes a recording that did not chart or was not released in that territory.

=== As featuring artist ===
List of singles
Title	Year	Peak	Album
Title	Year	US AC	Album
"Let's Fall in Love" (Calabria Foti featuring Seth MacFarlane)	2013	—	Non-album single
"White Christmas" (Meghan Trainor featuring Seth MacFarlane)	2020	1	A Very Trainor Christmas

=== Promotional singles ===
List of promotional singles, with selected chart positions, showing year released and album name
Title	Year	Album
"White Christmas" (with Elizabeth Gillies)	2024	Non-album single

== Other charted songs ==
List of other charted songs, with selected chart positions and certifications, showing year released and album name
Title	Year	Peak chart positions			Album
Title	Year	US	US R&B /HH	NZ Hot	Album
"Self Medication" (Logic featuring Seth MacFarlane, Redman and Statik Selektah)	2023	— (Note: "Self Medication" did not enter the Billboard Hot 100, but peaked at number 25 on the Bubbling Under Hot 100 Singles chart.)	49	21	College Park
"—" denotes a recording that did not chart or was not released in that territory.

== Guest appearances ==
List of non-single guest appearances, with other performing artists, showing year released and album name
Title	Year	Other artist(s)	Album
"Pure Imagination"	2016	Barbra Streisand	Encore: Movie Partners Sing Broadway
"Let's Face the Music and Dance"	2016	—	Sing: Original Motion Picture Soundtrack
"My Way"	2016	—	Sing: Original Motion Picture Soundtrack
"Pennies from Heaven"	2016	—	Sing: Original Motion Picture Soundtrack

== See also ==
- Seth MacFarlane filmography
- List of awards and nominations received by Seth MacFarlane
