= List of awards and nominations received by Seth MacFarlane =

Seth MacFarlane awards and nominations
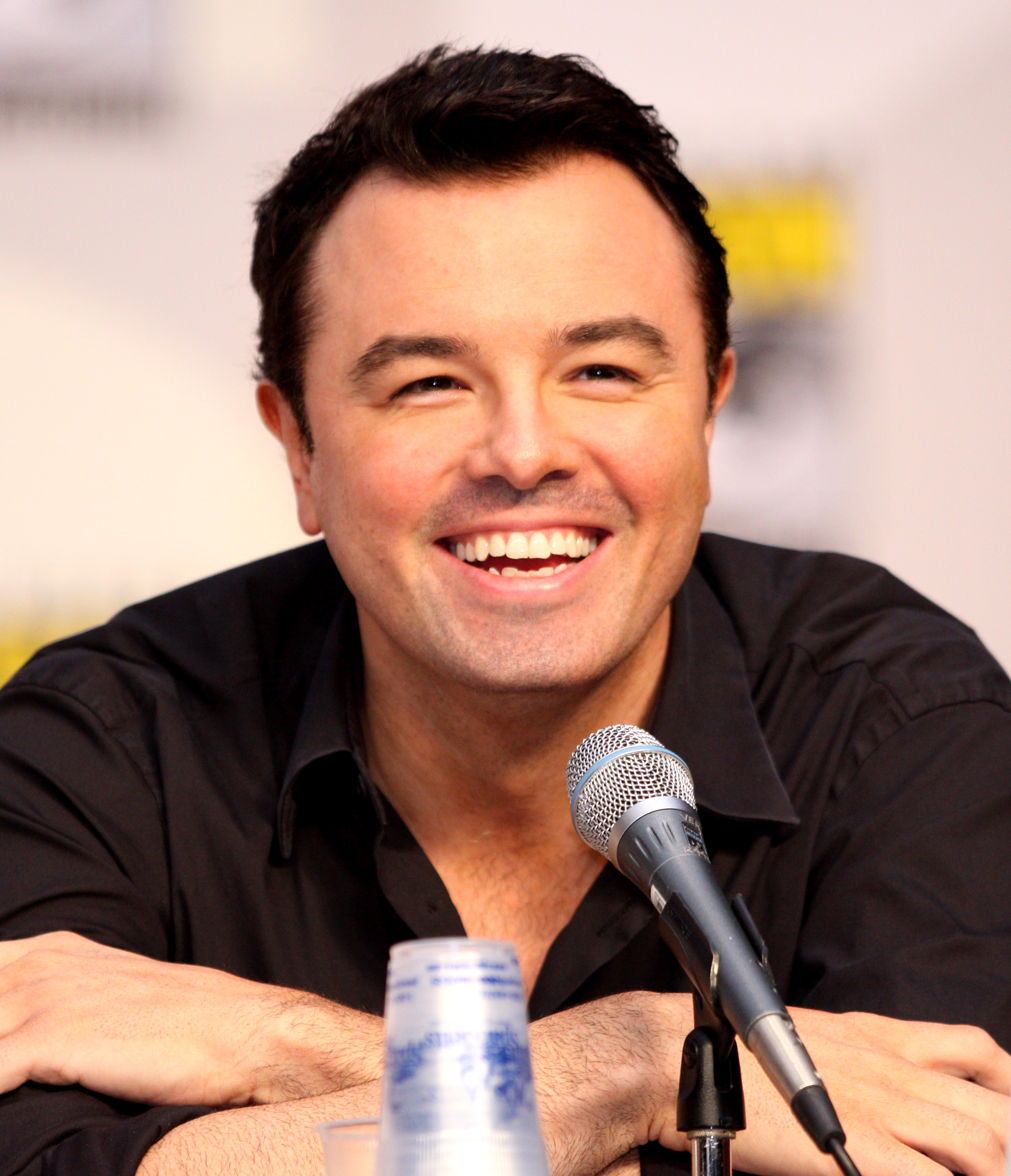
- MacFarlane at the 2010 San Diego Comic-Con
Awards and nominations
Award	Wins	Nominations
Academy Awards	0	1
BAFTA Awards	0	2
Emmy Awards	5	24
Grammy Awards	0	5

Totals (Note: Certain award groups do not simply award one winner. They acknowledge several different recipients, have runners-up, and have third place. Since this is a specific recognition and is different from losing an award, runner-up mentions are considered wins in this award tally. For simplification and to avoid errors, each award in this list has been presumed to have had a prior nomination.)
- Wins: 41
- Nominations: 148

Seth MacFarlane is an American actor, animator, writer, producer, director, comedian, and singer known for his work in film, television, and music. He has received several awards including five Primetime Emmy Awards, a Peabody Award, a Producers Guild of America Award, and a Writers Guild of America Award as well as nominations for an Academy Award, two British Academy Film Awards, and five Grammy Awards. He has received special honors such as a Star on the Hollywood Walk of Fame in 2019 and was inducted in the Television Hall of Fame in 2020.

He is known for creating and voicing several characters in the animated television shows Family Guy (1999–present), American Dad! (2005–present), and The Cleveland Show (2009–2013) and the science fiction series The Orville (2017–2022). His film projects include Ted (2012), A Million Ways to Die in the West (2014), and Ted 2 (2015). He has also released eight studio albums Music Is Better Than Words (2011), Holiday for Swing (2014), No One Ever Tells You (2015), In Full Swing (2017), Once in a While (2019), Great Songs from Stage & Screen (2020), Blue Skies (2022), and We Wish You the Merriest (2023).

He received an Academy Award for Best Original Song nomination for "Everybody Needs a Best Friend" from Ted (2012) at the 85th Academy Awards. He hosted that same ceremony for which he earned a Primetime Emmy Award for Outstanding Variety Special (Live) nomination. He made his directorial film debut with Ted earning a Critics' Choice Movie Award for Best Comedy nomination. He received five Grammy Award nominations three of which were for Best Traditional Pop Vocal Album for his albums Music Is Better Than Words (2011), No One Ever Tells You (2015), and In Full Swing (2017). He was also Grammy nominated for Best Comedy Album for Family Guy: Live in Vegas (2006).

For his work on the animated series Family Guy he received five Primetime Emmy Awards, four of which were for Outstanding Character Voice-Over Performance. He received two British Academy Television Award for Best International Programme nominations for Family Guy in 2008 and 2010. For the show he also received six Teen Choice Awards, two Saturn Awards, a People's Choice Award, a Producers Guild of America Award, and a Writers Guild of America Award. For producing the documentary series Cosmos: A Spacetime Odyssey (2014) he received a Peabody Award, the Critics' Choice Television Award for Best Reality Series, and Producers Guild of America Award for Best Non-Fiction Television.

== Major associations ==
=== Academy Awards ===
Year	Category	Nominated work	Result	Ref.
2013	Best Original Song	"Everybody Needs a Best Friend" (from Ted)	Nominated	

=== BAFTA Awards ===
Year	Category	Nominated work	Result	Ref.
British Academy Television Awards
2008	Best International Programme	Family Guy	Nominated	
2010	Best International Programme	Family Guy	Nominated	

=== Emmy Awards ===
Year	Category	Nominated work	Result	Ref.
Primetime Emmy Awards
2000	Outstanding Animated Program	Family Guy	Nominated	
2000	Outstanding Voice-Over Performance	Family Guy	Won	
2002	Outstanding Music and Lyrics	"You've Got a Lot to See" (from Family Guy: Brian Wallows and Peter's Swallows)	Won	
2005	Outstanding Animated Program	Family Guy	Nominated	
2006	Outstanding Animated Program	Family Guy	Nominated	
2008	Outstanding Animated Program	Family Guy	Nominated	
2009	Outstanding Comedy Series	Family Guy	Nominated	
2009	Outstanding Animated Program	American Dad!	Nominated	
2009	Outstanding Voice-Over Performance	Family Guy	Nominated	
2010	Outstanding Original Music and Lyrics	"Down's Syndrome Girl" (from Family Guy: Extra Large Medium)	Nominated	
2011	Outstanding Animated Program	The Cleveland Show	Nominated	
2011	Outstanding Original Music and Lyrics	"Christmastime Is Killing Us" (from Family Guy: Road to the North Pole)	Nominated	
2012	Outstanding Animated Program	American Dad!	Nominated	
2013	Outstanding Special Class Program	85th Academy Awards	Nominated	
2013	Outstanding Voice-Over Performance	Family Guy	Nominated	
2014	Outstanding Documentary or Nonfiction Series	Cosmos: A Spacetime Odyssey	Nominated	
2014	Outstanding Character Voice-Over Performance	Family Guy	Nominated	
2015	Outstanding Character Voice-Over Performance	Family Guy	Nominated	
2016	Outstanding Character Voice-Over Performance	Family Guy	Won	
2017	Outstanding Character Voice-Over Performance	Family Guy	Won	
2018	Outstanding Character Voice-Over Performance	Family Guy	Nominated	
2018	Outstanding Character Voice-Over Performance	American Dad!	Nominated	
2019	Outstanding Character Voice-Over Performance	Family Guy	Won	
2021	Outstanding Character Voice-Over Performance	Family Guy	Nominated	

=== Grammy Awards ===
Year	Category	Nominated work	Result	Ref.
2006	Best Comedy Album	Family Guy: Live in Vegas	Nominated	
2012	Best Traditional Pop Vocal Album	Music Is Better Than Words	Nominated	
2012	Best Song Written for Visual Media	"Christmastime Is Killing Us" (from Family Guy: Road to the North Pole)	Nominated	
2016	Best Traditional Pop Vocal Album	No One Ever Tells You	Nominated	
2018	Best Traditional Pop Vocal Album	In Full Swing	Nominated	

== Critics associations ==
Organizations	Year	Category	Project	Result	Ref.
Astra Awards	2022	Best Broadcast Network or Cable Animated Series	Family Guy	Nominated	
Astra Awards	2023	Best Broadcast Network or Cable Animated Series	Family Guy	Nominated	
Astra Awards	2024	Best Streaming Comedy Series	Ted	Nominated	
Astra Awards	2024	Best Directing in a Streaming Comedy Series	Ted	Nominated	
Astra Awards	2024	Best Writing in a Streaming Comedy Series	Ted	Nominated	
Astra Awards	2024	Best Voice-Over Performance	Ted	Nominated	
Astra Awards	2025	Best Lead Voice-Over Performance	Family Guy	Nominated	
Critics' Choice Awards	2012	Best Animated Series	Family Guy	Nominated	
Critics' Choice Awards	2013	Best Comedy	Ted	Nominated	
Critics' Choice Awards	2014	Best Animated Series	Family Guy	Nominated	
Critics' Choice Awards	2014	Best Reality Series	Cosmos: A Spacetime Odyssey	Won	
Critics' Choice Awards	2015	Louis XIII Genius Award	Seth MacFarlane	Won	
Georgia Film Critics Association	2013	Best Original Song	"Everybody Needs a Best Friend" (from Ted)	Nominated	
International Documentary Association Awards	2014	Best Limited Series	Cosmos: A Spacetime Odyssey	Nominated	
Phoenix Film Critics Society Awards	2012	Breakthrough Performance Behind the Camera	Ted	Nominated	
St. Louis Gateway Film Critics Association	2012	Best Comedy	Ted	Won	
TCA Awards	2014	Outstanding Achievement in News and Information	Cosmos: A Spacetime Odyssey	Won	

== Miscellaneous awards ==
Organizations	Year	Category	Project	Result	Ref.
Annie Awards	1999	Outstanding Music in an Animated Television Production	Family Guy	Nominated	
Annie Awards	2006	Best Voice Acting in an Animated Television Production	Family Guy	Won	
Annie Awards	2009	Best Voice Acting in an Animated Television Production	Family Guy	Nominated	
American Society of Composers, Authors and Publishers	2013	Top Television Series	Family Guy	Won	
American Society of Composers, Authors and Publishers	2013	Top Television Series	American Dad!	Won	
American Society of Composers, Authors and Publishers	2013	Top Television Series	The Cleveland Show	Won	
American Society of Composers, Authors and Publishers	2013	Top Box Office Films	Ted	Won	
The Comedy Awards	2011	Best Animated Comedy Series	Family Guy	Nominated	
The Comedy Awards	2011	Best Animated Comedy Series	American Dad!	Nominated	
The Comedy Awards	2012	Best Animated Comedy Series	Family Guy	Nominated	
DVD Exclusive Awards	2006	Best Overall Movie, Animated DVD Premiere	Stewie Griffin: The Untold Story	Won	
DVD Exclusive Awards	2006	Best Animated Character Performance	Stewie Griffin: The Untold Story	Won	
Empire Awards	2013	Best Comedy	Ted	Won	
Environmental Media Awards	2014	Best Reality Television	Cosmos: A Spacetime Odyssey for "The World Set Free"	Won	
Genesis Awards	2010	Sid Caesar Comedy Award	Family Guy for "Dog Gone"	Won	
GLAAD Media Awards	2007	Outstanding Individual TV Episode	American Dad! for "Lincoln Lover"	Nominated	
Golden Raspberry Awards	2015	Worst Actor	A Million Ways to Die in the West	Nominated	
Golden Raspberry Awards	2015	Worst Director	A Million Ways to Die in the West	Nominated	
Golden Raspberry Awards	2015	Worst Screen Combo (with Charlize Theron)	A Million Ways to Die in the West	Nominated	
Jupiter Awards	2012	Best International Film	Ted	Won	
MTV Movie & TV Awards	2013	Movie of the Year	Ted	Nominated	
MTV Movie & TV Awards	2013	Best Shirtless Performance	Ted	Nominated	
MTV Movie & TV Awards	2013	Best Fight (shared with Mark Wahlberg)	Ted	Nominated	
MTV Movie & TV Awards	2013	Best On-Screen Duo (with Mark Wahlberg)	Ted	Won	
MTV Movie & TV Awards	2013	Best WTF Moment	Ted	Nominated	
MTV Movie & TV Awards	2016	Best Virtual Performance	Ted 2	Nominated	
MTV Movie & TV Awards	2017	Best Comedic Performance	Family Guy	Nominated	
National Cartoonists Society Division Awards	2009	Television Animation Award	Family Guy	Won	
Peabody Award	2015	Peabody Award	Cosmos: A Spacetime Odyssey	Won	
People's Choice Awards	2007	Favorite Animated Comedy	Family Guy	Nominated	
People's Choice Awards	2008	Favorite Animated Comedy	Family Guy	Nominated	
People's Choice Awards	2009	Favorite Animated Comedy	Family Guy	Nominated	
People's Choice Awards	2011	Favorite TV Family (for the Griffin family)	Family Guy	Nominated	
People's Choice Awards	2013	Favorite Comedy Movie	Ted	Won	
People's Choice Awards	2014	Favorite New TV Comedy	Dads	Nominated	
People's Choice Awards	2015	Favorite Animated TV Show	Family Guy	Nominated	
People's Choice Awards	2015	Favorite Animated TV Show	American Dad!	Nominated	
People's Choice Awards	2016	Favorite Animated TV Show	Family Guy	Nominated	
People's Choice Awards	2016	Favorite Animated TV Show	American Dad!	Nominated	
People's Choice Awards	2016	Favorite Comedic Movie	Ted 2	Nominated	
People's Choice Awards	2017	Favorite Animated TV Show	Family Guy	Nominated	
People's Choice Awards	2017	Favorite Animated TV Show	American Dad!	Nominated	
PRISM Awards	2009	Best Comedy Episode	American Dad! for "Spring Break-Up"	Nominated	
Producers Guild of America Awards	2015	Outstanding Producer of Non-Fiction Television	Cosmos: A Spacetime Odyssey	Won	
Satellite Awards	2004	Best DVD Release of TV Shows	Family Guy for Volume 2	Nominated	
Saturn Awards	2008	Best Television Presentation	Family Guy for "Blue Harvest"	Won	
Saturn Awards	2013	Best Fantasy Film	Ted	Nominated	
Saturn Awards	2016	Best Fantasy Film	Ted 2	Nominated	
Saturn Awards	2017	Best Animated Series or Film on Television	Family Guy	Nominated	
Saturn Awards	2018	Best Science Fiction Television Series	The Orville	Won	
Saturn Awards	2018	Best Actor on Television	The Orville	Nominated	
Saturn Awards	2018	Best Animated Series or Film on Television	Family Guy	Nominated	
Saturn Awards	2019	Best Science Fiction Television Series	The Orville	Nominated	
Saturn Awards	2019	Best Actor on Television	The Orville	Nominated	
Saturn Awards	2019	Best Animated Series on Television	Family Guy	Nominated	
Saturn Awards	2021	Best Animated Series or Film on Television	Family Guy	Nominated	
Saturn Awards	2022	Best Science Fiction Television Series	The Orville	Nominated	
Saturn Awards	2024	Robert Forster Artist's Award	Seth MacFarlane	Won	
Spike Guys' Choice Awards	2012	Funniest M.F.	Seth MacFarlane	Won	
Spike Guys' Choice Awards	2013	Guy Movie of the Year	Ted	Won	
Spike Video Game Awards	2006	Best Game Based on a Movie or TV Show	Family Guy Video Game!	Nominated	
Spike Video Game Awards	2006	Best Performance by a Male	Family Guy Video Game!	Nominated	
Spike Video Game Awards	2006	Best Cast	Family Guy Video Game!	Won	
Teen Choice Awards	2005	Choice TV Show: Comedy	Family Guy	Nominated	
Teen Choice Awards	2005	Choice TV Actor: Comedy	Family Guy	Nominated	
Teen Choice Awards	2005	Choice TV Chemistry	Family Guy	Nominated	
Teen Choice Awards	2005	Choice TV Sidekick	Family Guy	Nominated	
Teen Choice Awards	2005	Choice TV: Choice Summer Series	American Dad!	Nominated	
Teen Choice Awards	2005	Choice TV: Choice V-Cast	American Dad!	Nominated	
Teen Choice Awards	2006	Choice Animated Series	American Dad!	Nominated	
Teen Choice Awards	2006	Choice Animated Series	Family Guy	Won	
Teen Choice Awards	2007	Choice Animated Series	Family Guy	Nominated	
Teen Choice Awards	2008	Choice Animated Series	Family Guy	Won	
Teen Choice Awards	2008	Choice Animated Series	American Dad!	Nominated	
Teen Choice Awards	2009	Choice Animated Series	Family Guy	Nominated	
Teen Choice Awards	2009	Choice Animated Series	American Dad!	Nominated	
Teen Choice Awards	2010	Choice Animated Series	Family Guy	Won	
Teen Choice Awards	2010	Choice Animated Series	American Dad!	Nominated	
Teen Choice Awards	2010	Choice Animated Series	The Cleveland Show	Nominated	
Teen Choice Awards	2011	Choice Animated Series	Family Guy	Nominated	
Teen Choice Awards	2011	Choice TV Villain	Family Guy	Nominated	
Teen Choice Awards	2011	Choice Animated Series	American Dad!	Nominated	
Teen Choice Awards	2011	Choice Animated Series	The Cleveland Show	Nominated	
Teen Choice Awards	2012	Choice Animated Series	Family Guy	Nominated	
Teen Choice Awards	2012	Choice Summer Movie: Comedy or Music	Ted	Nominated	
Teen Choice Awards	2012	Choice Movie Voice	Ted	Nominated	
Teen Choice Awards	2012	Choice Movie Chemistry (with Mark Wahlberg)	Ted	Nominated	
Teen Choice Awards	2013	Choice Animated Series	Family Guy	Nominated	
Teen Choice Awards	2014	Choice Animated Series	Family Guy	Nominated	
Teen Choice Awards	2014	Choice Reality Series	Cosmos: A Spacetime Odyssey	Nominated	
Teen Choice Awards	2015	Choice Animated Series	Family Guy	Won	
Teen Choice Awards	2016	Choice Animated Series	Family Guy	Won	
Teen Choice Awards	2017	Choice Animated Series	Family Guy	Won	
Teen Choice Awards	2018	Choice Animated Series	Family Guy	Nominated	
Webby Awards	2009	Film & Video Person of the Year	Seth MacFarlane	Won	
Writers Guild of America Awards	2015	Animation Writers Caucus Animation Writing Award	Seth MacFarlane	Won	
Young Artist Awards	2008	Best Family Television Series	The Winner	Nominated	

== Honorary awards ==
Organizations	Year	Notes	Result	Ref.
Hollywood Walk of Fame	2019	Television Star	Honored	
Television Hall of Fame	2020	Inducted	Honored	

== See also ==
- Seth MacFarlane filmography
- Seth MacFarlane discography
