= Blue Skies (Seth MacFarlane album) =

Studio album by Seth MacFarlane
- Released: May 20, 2022
- Studio: Abbey Road Studios
- Genres: Traditional pop; easy listening; swing; big band
- Length: 41:57
- Labels: Republic; Verve; Fuzzy Door
- Producers: Joel McNeely; Seth MacFarlane

Seth MacFarlane chronology
Great Songs from Stage & Screen (2020)	Blue Skies (2022)	We Wish You the Merriest (2023)

Singles from Blue Skies
- 1. "No Moon at All" Released: April 20, 2022

Blue Skies is the seventh studio album by American actor and singer Seth MacFarlane, released on May 20, 2022, through Republic Records and Verve Records. MacFarlane reunited with his frequent collaborator Joel McNeely to produce the album. The album's lead single, "No Moon at All", was released digitally on April 20, 2022.

== Background ==
On April 21, 2022, It was announced that MacFarlane would release his new album the following month. MacFarlane collaborated with Andrew Cottee again, after previously working on his fifth album Once in a While. He recorded the album at Abbey Road Studios, making it his sixth time recording at the studio. MacFarlane said on collaborating with Cottee again, "I have long been a fan of Andrew Cottee's supremely artful and buoyant orchestrations," MacFarlane tells Variety. "So after our last collaboration, 'Once in A While,' a ballad-themed record, I really wanted to hear what he could do with an up-tempo album." Cottee also said on working with him, "Cottee speaks in terms of raising the bar. "This is the album I've always wanted to make. The chance to collaborate with an artist like Seth MacFarlane and work with such a high calibre of players is a dream for any arranger." MacFarlane and Cottee wrote an original song for the album, "Unless I Do It All With You".

== Singles ==
The album's lead single, "No Moon at All", was released on April 20, 2022.

== Track listing ==
All music arranged and conducted by Andrew Cottee.

No.	Title	Writer(s)	Length
1.	"It's You or No One"	Sammy Cahn; Jule Styne	2:49
2.	"No Moon at All"	David Mann; Redd Evans	2:22
3.	"You'll Get Yours"	Dok Stanford; Jimmy Van Heusen	2:45
4.	"A Hundred Years from Today"	Victor Young; Ned Washington; Joe Young	3:00
5.	"If I Were a Bell"	Frank Loesser	2:22
6.	"Out of Nowhere"	Johnny Green; Edward Heyman	3:12
7.	"On Green Dolphin Street"	Bronisław Kaper; Washington	3:04
8.	"That Old Feeling"	Lew Brown; Sammy Fain	2:49
9.	"Blue Skies"	Irving Berlin	3:14
10.	"It Could Happen to You"	Van Heusen; Johnny Burke	2:53
11.	"I Didn't Know About You"	Duke Ellington; Bob Russell	3:37
12.	"You Turned the Tables on Me"	Louis Alter; Sidney D. Mitchell	3:13
13.	"Never in a Million Years"	Mack Gordon; Harry Revel	3:42
14.	"Unless I Do It All With You"	Seth MacFarlane; Andrew Cottee	2:46
Total length:			41:48

== Personnel ==
Credits adapted from AllMusic.

- Louis Alter – Composer
- Jonathan Aasgaard – Cello
- Thomas Beer – Viola
- Chuck Berghofer – Bass
- Irving Berlin – Composer
- Anna Liisa Bezrodny – Violin
- Rich Breen – Engineer, Mixing
- Lew Brown – Composer
- Johnny Burke – Composer
- Marcy Buta – Violin
- Sammy Cahn – Composer
- Rowena Calvert – Cello
- Gordon Campbell – Trombone
- Jon Cassar – Cover Photo
- Meghan Cassidy – Viola
- Rebecca Chambers – Viola
- Stephano Civetta – Assistant Engineer
- Dave Collins – Mastering
- Andrew Cottee – Arranger and Conductor
- Jay Craig – Sax (Baritone)
- Dream Town Orchestra – Orchestration
- Schlomy Dobrinsky – Violin
- Duke Ellington – Composer
- Peter Erskine – Drums
- Redd Evans – Composer
- Sammy Fain – Composer
- Joy Fehily – Executive Producer
- Andrew Gathercole – Trumpet
- Iain Gibbs – Violin
- Mark Graham – Music Preparation
- Mack Gordon – Composer
- Johnny Green – Composer
- Dan Hayden – Assistant Engineer
- Edward Heyman – Composer
- James Van Heusen – Composer
- Dan Higgins – Clarinet, Sax (Alto)
- Jeremy Isaac – Violin
- Maya Iwabuchi – Violin
- Charis Jenson – Violin
- Cerys Jones – Violin
- Charlie Lovell-Jones – Violin
- Michael Jones – Violin
- JoAnn Kane – Music Preparation
- Bronislaw Kaper – Composer
- Liam Kirkman – Trombone
- Larry Koonse – Guitars
- Alexandra Lomeika – Violin
- Mike Lovatt – Trumpet
- Frank Loesser – Composer
- James Lynch – Trumpet
- Jens Lynen – Violin
- Dave Mann – Composer
- Seth MacFarlane – Vocals and Producer
- Ciaran McCabe – Violin
- Joel McNeely – Producer
- Laura Melhuish – Violin
- John Mills – Violin
- Sidney D. Mitchell – Composer
- Alex Neal – Percussion
- Peter North – Trombone
- Matthew Quenby – Viola
- Tom Ranier – Piano
- Harry Revel – Composer
- Ben Rogerson – Cello
- Bob Russell – Composer
- Naomi Samuel – Cello
- Colin Skinner – Sax (Alto)
- Kristen Sorace – Design
- Dok Stanford – Composer
- Jonathan Stokes – Trombone
- Jule Styne – Composer
- Jamie Talbot – Sax (Tenor)
- Michael Trainor – Violin
- Helen Tunstall – Harp
- Ned Washington – Composer
- Martin Williams – Sax (Tenor)
- Pat White – Trumpet
- Joseph Young – Composer
- Victor Young – Composer

== Release history ==
Region	Date	Format(s)	Label	Ref.
Worldwide	May 20, 2022	Digital download; streaming; CD; vinyl	Republic; Verve; Fuzzy Door Productions	
