= Seth MacFarlane =

American actor, animator, filmmaker, and singer (born 1973)

- MacFarlane in Newport Beach in 2026
- Born: Seth Woodbury MacFarlane; October 26, 1973 (age 53); Kent, Connecticut, U.S.
- Education: Rhode Island School of Design (BFA)
- Occupations: Actor; animator; filmmaker; comedian; singer
- Years active: 1995–present
- Organization: Fuzzy Door Productions
- Works: Filmography; discography
- Relatives: Rachael MacFarlane (sister); Arthur Sager (grandfather)
- Awards: Full list
- Musical career
- Genres: Traditional pop; easy listening; jazz; show tunes; swing; big band; musical comedy
- Instruments: Vocals; piano
- Labels: Republic; Verve; Fuzzy Door
- Website: sethmacfarlanemusic.com

Seth Woodbury MacFarlane (/məkˈfɑːrlɪn/; born October 26, 1973) is an American actor, animator, filmmaker, comedian, and singer. He is the creator and star of the television series Family Guy and The Orville, and co-creator of the television series American Dad! and The Cleveland Show. He co-wrote, co-produced, directed and starred in the films Ted, its sequel Ted 2 and A Million Ways to Die in the West.

MacFarlane is a graduate of the Rhode Island School of Design (RISD), where he studied animation. He was recruited as an animator and writer for Hanna-Barbera's television series Johnny Bravo, Cow and Chicken and Dexter's Laboratory. During this time, he created the animated short Larry & Steve—a loose precursor of Family Guy—for Fred Seibert's What a Cartoon!. In 2008, he created the online series Seth MacFarlane's Cavalcade of Cartoon Comedy. MacFarlane has made guest appearances as an actor on live action shows, including Gilmore Girls, Star Trek: Enterprise, The War at Home and FlashForward. MacFarlane has won several awards for his work on Family Guy, including five Primetime Emmy Awards. In 2009, he won the Webby Award for Film & Video Person of the Year.

MacFarlane has performed as a vocalist at the Hollywood Bowl, Carnegie Hall and the Royal Albert Hall. He has released ten studio albums, in the vein of Frank Sinatra, with influences from jazz orchestrations, and Hollywood musicals, beginning with Music Is Better Than Words (2011). MacFarlane has received five Grammy Award nominations. He has frequently collaborated with artists such as Sara Bareilles, Norah Jones and Elizabeth Gillies on his albums. He hosted the 85th Academy Awards in 2013 and was nominated for Best Original Song for "Everybody Needs a Best Friend" from Ted.

MacFarlane was executive producer of the Neil deGrasse Tyson-hosted Cosmos: A Spacetime Odyssey, an update of the 1980s Cosmos series hosted by Carl Sagan. He received a star on the Hollywood Walk of Fame in 2019 and was inducted into the Television Hall of Fame in 2020.

== Early life and education ==
Seth Woodbury MacFarlane was born on October 26, 1973, in Kent, Connecticut. His parents, Ronald Milton MacFarlane (born 1946) and Ann Perry (née Sager; 1947–2010), were born in Newburyport, Massachusetts. His younger sister Rachael is a voice actress. His maternal grandfather, Arthur Sager, competed in the 1928 Summer Olympics in track and field. His parents met in 1970 when they lived and worked in Boston and married later in 1970. They moved to Kent in 1972, and Ann began working in the admissions office at South Kent School in South Kent, Connecticut. She later worked in the college guidance and admissions offices at the Kent School, a selective college-preparatory school, where Ronald was a teacher.

As a child, Seth MacFarlane developed an interest in illustration, and at the age of two he began drawing cartoon characters, including Fred Flintstone and Woody Woodpecker. By age five, he knew he wanted to pursue a career in animation and began by creating flip books after his parents found a book on the subject for him. At nine, he began publishing a weekly comic strip, Walter Crouton, for The Kent Good Times Dispatch, the local newspaper; it paid him five dollars per week. MacFarlane said that as a child he was always "weirdly fascinated by the communion ceremony". He created a strip with a character kneeling at the altar taking communion and asking, "Can I have fries with that?" The paper printed it, and he got an "angry letter" from the local priest; it led to "sort of a little mini-controversy" in the town. MacFarlane received his high school diploma in 1991 from the Kent School. While there, he continued experimenting with animation, and his parents gave him an 8 mm film camera.

After graduating from high school, MacFarlane attended the Rhode Island School of Design (RISD), where he majored in animation. As a student, he intended to work for Disney but changed his mind after seeing The Simpsons. During his time at RISD, he performed stand-up comedy. He starred in many student films, meeting future Family Guy cast member Mike Henry, whose brother Patrick was MacFarlane's classmate. In his senior year, he made his thesis film, The Life of Larry, which became the inspiration for Family Guy. A professor submitted his film to the animation studio Hanna-Barbera, where he was later hired. He graduated in 1995 with a Bachelor of Fine Arts degree.

== Career ==
=== Television career ===
==== Hanna-Barbera years ====
MacFarlane was recruited during the senior film festival by development executive Ellen Cockrill and president Fred Seibert. He went to work at Hanna-Barbera (then Hanna-Barbera Cartoons) based on the writing content of The Life of Larry rather than on his drawing abilities. He was one of only a few people hired by the company solely based on writing talent. He worked as an animator and writer for Cartoon Network's Cartoon Cartoons series. He created Larry & Steve, a sequel to The Life of Larry, featuring middle-aged Larry and his intellectual dog, Steve. The short was broadcast as one of Cartoon Network's World Premiere Toons. He described the atmosphere at Hanna-Barbera as resembling an "old-fashioned Hollywood structure, where you move from one show to another or you jump from a writing job on one show to a storyboard job on another". MacFarlane worked on three television series during his tenure at the studio: Dexter's Laboratory, Cow and Chicken and Johnny Bravo. Working as both a writer and storyboard artist, MacFarlane spent the most time on Johnny Bravo. He found it easier to develop his own style at Johnny Bravo through the show's process of scriptwriting, which Dexter's Laboratory and Cow and Chicken did not use. As a part of the Johnny Bravo crew, he met actors and voiceover artists such as Adam West and Jack Sheldon of Schoolhouse Rock! fame. These meetings became significant to the production and success of his Family Guy series.

He did freelance work for Walt Disney Television Animation, writing for Jungle Cubs, and for Nelvana, where he wrote for Ace Ventura: Pet Detective. Through strict observation of writing elements such as story progression, character stakes and plot points, MacFarlane found the work for Disney was, from a writing standpoint, very valuable in preparation for his career (particularly on Ace Ventura). He created and wrote a short titled Zoomates for Frederator Studios' Oh Yeah! Cartoons on Nickelodeon. Executives at the Fox Broadcasting Company saw both Larry shorts and negotiations began for a prime-time animated series.

==== Family Guy ====
Although MacFarlane enjoyed working at Hanna-Barbera, he felt his calling was for prime-time animation, which would allow a much edgier style of humor. He first pitched Family Guy to Fox during his tenure at Hanna-Barbera. A development executive there, who was trying to get back into prime-time business, introduced MacFarlane to Leslie Kolins and Mike Darnell, heads of the alternative comedy department at Fox. After the success of King of the Hill in 1997, MacFarlane called Kolins once more to ask about a possible second pitch for the series. Fox offered MacFarlane a deal, giving him a budget of $50,000 (equivalent to $100,000 in 2025) to produce a pilot that could lead to a series (most episodes of animated prime-time productions cost at least $1 million). Recalling the experience in an interview with The New York Times, MacFarlane said: "I spent about six months with no sleep and no life, just drawing like crazy in my kitchen and doing this pilot."

After six months, MacFarlane returned to Fox with a "very, very simply, crudely animated film—with just enough to get the tone of the show across" to present to the executives, who loved the pilot and immediately ordered the series. In July 1998, they announced the purchase of Family Guy for a January 1999 debut. Family Guy was originally intended to be a series of shorts on MADtv, much in the same way The Simpsons had begun on The Tracey Ullman Show. Negotiations for the show's MADtv connection fell through early on as a result of budgetary concerns. At age 24, MacFarlane was television's youngest executive producer.

Family Guy first aired January 31, 1999. MacFarlane's work in animating Family Guy was influenced by Jackie Gleason and Hanna-Barbera along with examples from The Simpsons and All in the Family. In addition to writing three episodes, "Death Has a Shadow", "Family Guy Viewer Mail 1", and "North by North Quahog", MacFarlane voices Family Guy's main male characters of Peter Griffin, Stewie Griffin, Brian Griffin, and Glenn Quagmire, as well as Tom Tucker, his son Jake Tucker, and other characters. Bolstered by high DVD sales and fan loyalty, Family Guy developed into a $1-billion franchise. On May 4, 2008, after approximately two and a half years of negotiations, MacFarlane reached a $100-million agreement with Fox to keep Family Guy and American Dad! until 2012. It made him the world's highest paid television writer.

MacFarlane's success with Family Guy opened doors to other ventures relating to the show. On April 26, 2005, he and composer Walter Murphy created Family Guy: Live in Vegas. The soundtrack features a Broadway show tune theme, and MacFarlane voiced Stewie in the track "Stewie's Sexy Party". A fan of Broadway musicals, MacFarlane comments on using musicals as a component of Family Guy:

I love the lush orchestration and old-fashioned melody writing ... it just gets you excited, that kind of music", he said. "It's very optimistic. And it's fun. The one thing that's missing for me from popular music today is fun. Guys like [Bing] Crosby, or [Frank] Sinatra, or Dean Martin, or Mel Tormé [...] these are guys who sounded like they were having a great time.

A video game, Family Guy Video Game!, was released in 2006. In August 2007, MacFarlane closed a digital content production deal with AdSense. He takes cast members on the road to voice characters in front of live audiences. Family Guy Live provides fans with the opportunity to hear future scripts. In mid-2007, Chicago fans had the opportunity to hear the then-upcoming sixth-season premiere "Blue Harvest". Shows have played in Montreal, New York City, Chicago, and Los Angeles.

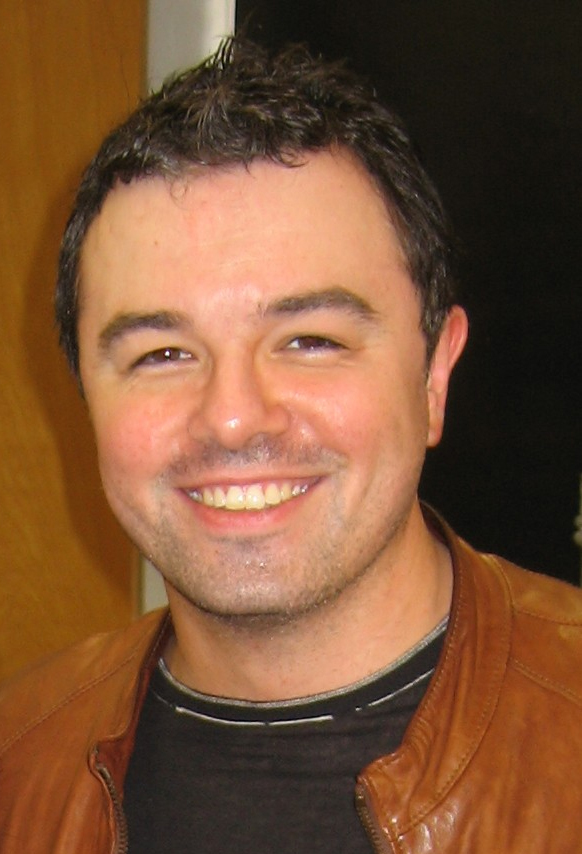
MacFarlane at a Rhode Island School of Design reception on June 1, 2007

On July 22, 2007, MacFarlane announced that he might start work on a feature film, although "nothing's official". In September 2007, Ricky Blitt gave TV.com an interview confirming that he had already started working on the script. Then in TV Week on July 18, 2008, MacFarlane confirmed plans to produce a theatrically released Family Guy feature film sometime "within the next year". He came up with an idea for the story, "something that you could not do on the show, which [to him] is the only reason to do a movie". He said he imagines the film to be "an old-style musical with dialogue" similar to The Sound of Music, saying that he would "really be trying to capture, musically, that feel". On October 13, 2011, MacFarlane confirmed that a deal for a Family Guy film had been made, and that he would write it with series co-producer Ricky Blitt. On November 30, 2012, he confirmed plans for the project. The project was put on hold while MacFarlane worked on Ted 2. In 2018, Fox announced that a live-action/animated film based on the series is in development. MacFarlane stepped away from the series in 2011 to work on Ted and other projects, and has only worked with the show as a voice actor since.

Family Guy has often been criticized. The Parents Television Council has been a frequent critic. It organized a letter-writing campaign to remove it from Fox's lineup, and filed complaints with the Federal Communications Commission alleging that some of its episodes contained indecent content. MacFarlane has responded to the PTC's criticism by saying, among other things: "That's like getting hate mail from Hitler. They're literally terrible human beings."

Family Guy has been canceled twice, although strong fan support and DVD sales have caused Fox to reconsider. MacFarlane mentioned how these cancellations affected the lineup of writers: "One of the positive aspects of Family Guy constantly being pulled off [the air] is that we were always having to restaff writers."

During its sixth season, episodes of Family Guy and American Dad! were delayed from regular broadcast due to the 2007–2008 Writers Guild of America strike. MacFarlane participated in the strike to support the writers, and Fox aired three Family Guy episodes without his permission. The strike ended on February 12, 2008.

==== American Dad! ====
MacFarlane has a second long-running adult animated series in American Dad!, which has been in production since early 2005. It is his only animated series that has not been canceled, though it has undergone two network relocations: from Fox to TBS following its 11th season, and from TBS back to Fox following its 21st. MacFarlane provides the voices of protagonist Stan Smith and prominent secondary character Roger. His sister Rachael provides the voice of Hayley, Stan's daughter. Additionally, he co-wrote the show's first episode. Aside from his voice acting work, MacFarlane has left much of American Dad!'s creative direction to the show's other co-creators, Matt Weitzman and Mike Barker (the latter departed after ten seasons), feeling it helps give the series its own voice and identity.

MacFarlane has stated that his inspiration to create American Dad! derived from his and Weitzman's exasperation with the George W. Bush administration. MacFarlane has described the initial seasons of American Dad! as being similar to All in the Family, likening Stan's originally bigoted persona to Archie Bunker. After the early couple of seasons however, the series discontinued using these elements of political satire and changed to its own humor. MacFarlane was described as having difficulty understanding the series in its early going; however, he warmed up to the series after its early seasons once he felt the show truly came into its own. His fellow co-creators have sensed this through MacFarlane's greatly increased attention to the series after its early seasons. MacFarlane has revealed he is an American Dad! fan himself. He has taken note of the positive reaction to the Roger character by fans via his Twitter.

==== The Cleveland Show ====
MacFarlane developed a Family Guy spin-off called The Cleveland Show, which focuses on the character of Cleveland Brown and his family. The idea for the show originated from a suggestion by Family Guy writer and voice of Cleveland, Mike Henry. Fox ordered 22 episodes and the series first aired on September 27, 2009. The show, which was picked up to air a first season consisting of 22 episodes, was picked up by Fox for a second season, consisting of 13 episodes, bringing the total number to 35 episodes. The announcement was made on May 3, 2009, before the first season premiered. Due to strong ratings, Fox picked up the back nine episodes of season 2, making a 22-episode season and bringing the total episode count of the show to 44. The series ended on May 19, 2013, with a total of 4 seasons and 88 episodes. The character of Cleveland and his family returned to Family Guy in the episode "He's Bla-ack!".

==== Cavalcade of Cartoon Comedy ====
In 2008, MacFarlane released a series of webisodes known as Seth MacFarlane's Cavalcade of Cartoon Comedy with its animated shorts sponsored by Burger King and released weekly.

==== The Orville ====
In 2016, MacFarlane began producing the science fiction comedy-drama series The Orville, in which he stars as Captain Edward "Ed" Mercer. MacFarlane originally wrote The Orville as a spec script, which was given a 13-episode order by Fox in May 2016, making it the first live-action television series created by MacFarlane. The series premiered on September 10, 2017. Despite the first season receiving negative reviews, it was renewed for a second season. The second season premiered on December 30, 2018, and received better reviews.

The series was renewed for a third season by Fox. The series moved over to Hulu. The season is the show's first on Hulu, after airing its previous two seasons on Fox, as well as the first to premiere since The Walt Disney Company's March 2019 acquisition of 20th Century Fox. The season was originally scheduled to premiere in 2020 but was delayed due to the COVID-19 pandemic. The third season titled as The Orville: New Horizons premiered on June 2, 2022. Due to the pandemic, an episode of the third season was scrapped, which MacFarlane subsequently turned into a novel, titled The Orville: Sympathy for the Devil.

==== Television producing ====
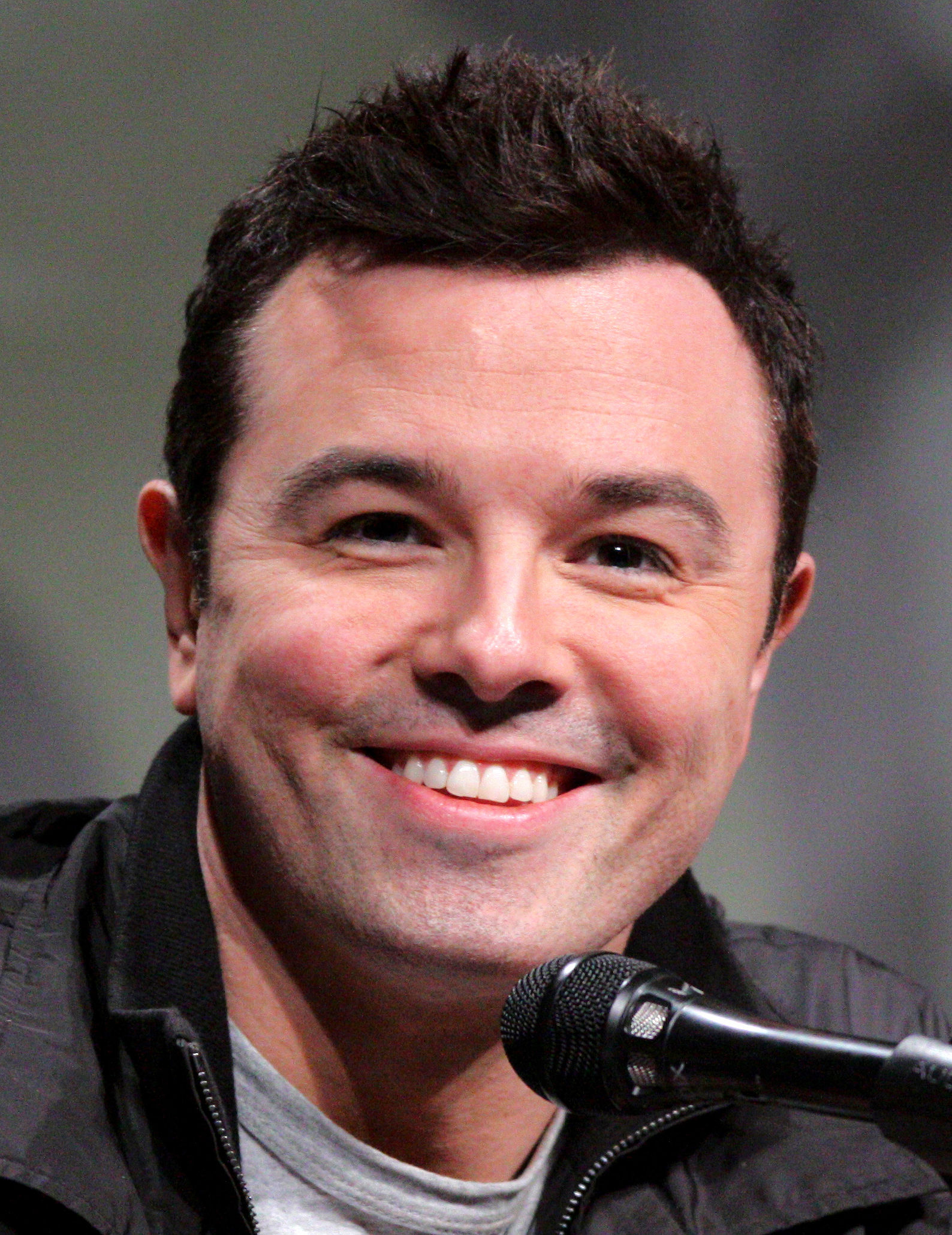
MacFarlane in 2012

MacFarlane was the executive producer of a live-action sitcom starring Rob Corddry called The Winner. The show ran on Fox for six episodes in Spring 2007.

In August 2011, Fox ordered a 13-part updated series of Cosmos: A Spacetime Odyssey. MacFarlane co-produced the series with Ann Druyan and Steven Soter. The series is hosted by Neil deGrasse Tyson and began airing on the channel in March 2014, with repeats airing on the National Geographic Channel on the next night. In addition to serving as one of the executive producers, MacFarlane provided voices for characters during the animated portions of the series. MacFarlane returned to executive produce and provide voices to its sequel series, Cosmos: Possible Worlds, which aired in 2020.

In 2013 and 2014, MacFarlane produced one season of a live-action sitcom called Dads. The series, revolves around Eli, played by Seth Green, and Warner, played by Giovanni Ribisi, two successful guys in their 30s whose world is turned upside down when their dads move in with them. MacFarlane, Alec Sulkin and Wellesley Wild executive-produced the series, with Sulkin and Wild writing.

In 2014, MacFarlane executive produced a two-season, 20-episode series called Blunt Talk for Starz.

In 2009, MacFarlane began work on the animated series Bordertown. The series is set in Texas and follows a border patrol agent and a Mexican immigrant, satirizing America's changing cultural landscape. It ran for 13 episodes in the first half of 2016, on Fox.

==== Television hosting ====
MacFarlane has participated in the Comedy Central Roasts. MacFarlane is the only person to serve as roastmaster for more than one roast. In 2010, he filled this role for the roast of David Hasselhoff. The following year he was roastmaster at the roasts of Donald Trump and Charlie Sheen.

On October 1, 2012, it was announced that MacFarlane would host the 85th Academy Awards on February 24, 2013. He presented the nominees with actress Emma Stone, on January 10, 2013. In addition to hosting, MacFarlane was nominated in the Academy Award for Best Original Song category for co-writing the theme song "Everybody Needs a Best Friend" for his film Ted with Walter Murphy. Critical response to MacFarlane's performance was mixed. Columnist Owen Gleiberman of Entertainment Weekly commented "By calling constant attention to the naughty factor," MacFarlane created "an echo chamber of outrage, working a little too hard to top himself with faux-scandalous gags about race, Jews in Hollywood, and the killing of Abraham Lincoln." Tim Goodman of The Hollywood Reporter praised MacFarlane's performance saying that he did "impressively better than one would have wagered". He noted that he added "plenty of niceties with a little bit of the Ricky Gervais bite-the-hand-that-feeds-you thing and worked the juxtaposition rather nicely". He stirred up controversy in the form of a musical number titled "We Saw Your Boobs".

On October 29, 2014, it was announced that MacFarlane would host the Breakthrough Prize ceremony. The event was held in Silicon Valley and televised on November 15, 2014, on Discovery Channel and Science, and globally on November 22, 2014, on BBC World News. He returned to host the following year.

=== Film career ===
==== Ted ====
MacFarlane made his directorial live-action film debut with the release of Ted in 2012. He announced that he was directing it on an episode of Conan that aired on February 10, 2011. Along with directing the film, he wrote the screenplay, served as producer, and starred as the title character.

Ted tells the story of John Bennett (Mark Wahlberg) and his talking teddy bear (MacFarlane) who keeps John and his girlfriend Lori Collins (Mila Kunis) from moving on with their lives. The film received generally favorable reviews from critics, and was a box office success, opening with the highest weekend gross of all time for an original R-rated comedy. Internationally, the movie is the highest-grossing original R-rated comedy of all time, beating The Hangover. A sequel, Ted 2, was released on June 26, 2015.

It was announced in June 2021 that Peacock had given a straight to series order for a prequel series. In addition to serving as executive producer for the series, MacFarlane reprises his role as Ted. Due to its prequel nature, Wahlberg and Kunis do not reprise their roles. In August 2024, it was announced that an animated series based on the franchise was in development.

==== A Million Ways to Die in the West ====
MacFarlane co-wrote and starred in his second film, A Million Ways to Die in the West. Alec Sulkin and Wellesley Wild were co-writers for the film. It follows a cowardly sheep farmer (MacFarlane) who loses a gunfight and sees his girlfriend leave him for another man. When a mysterious woman rides into town, she helps him find his courage. But when her outlaw husband arrives seeking revenge, the farmer must put his newfound courage to the test. The film was met with mixed reviews from critics.

On January 27, 2014, MacFarlane announced that he wrote a companion novel based on the film's script, which was released on March 4, 2014. An audio-book version was made available, narrated by Jonathan Frakes. MacFarlane wrote the book on weekends during shooting for the film, partially due to boredom.

=== Music career ===
==== Record deal and albums ====
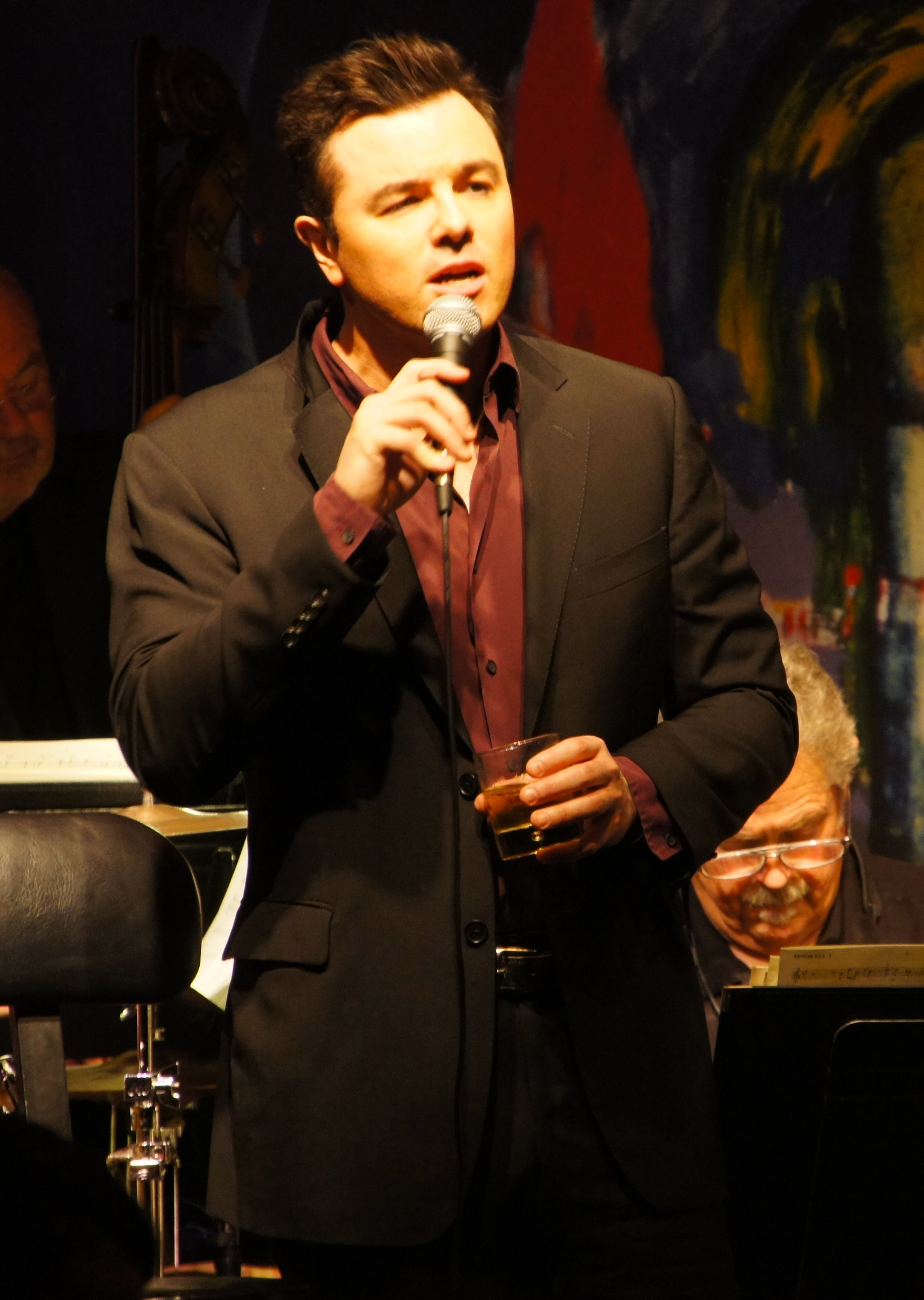
MacFarlane performing in 2014

In 2010, MacFarlane signed a record deal with Universal Republic Records. He released his debut album, Music Is Better Than Words, in 2011. The album is a big band/standards album drawing on his training in and attraction to "the Great American Songbook and particularly the early- to late-'50s era of orchestration". The album featured duets with Norah Jones and Sara Bareilles. It was nominated in the Best Traditional Pop Vocal Album and the Best Engineered Album, Non-Classical categories at the 54th Grammy Awards. It received a score of 52 out of 100 on Metacritic's compilation of music critic reviews. In 2014, he released his second studio album and first Christmas album Holiday for Swing. It received mostly positive reviews. In 2015, his third studio album No One Ever Tells You was nominated for a Grammy Award for Best Traditional Pop Vocal Album. In 2016, he was honored by Barbara Sinatra at the 28th annual Frank Sinatra Celebrity Invitational.

He released his fourth studio album, In Full Swing, in 2017, again featuring songs composed by Joel McNeely. Three singles were released from it: "That Face", "Almost Like Being in Love", and "Have You Met Miss Jones?" The album was nominated for two Grammy Awards for Best Traditional Pop Vocal Album and Best Arrangement, Instrumental and Vocals. In 2019, for his fifth studio album Once in a While, MacFarlane worked with composer Andrew Cottee.

In 2020, MacFarlane released his sixth studio album, Great Songs from Stage & Screen, with composer Bruce Broughton, who he works with on The Orville, to compose the album. Like his previous four albums, he recorded a majority of the songs at Abbey Road Studios. However, much of the album's post-production work was done at home due to the COVID-19 pandemic. In 2022, MacFarlane released his seventh studio album, Blue Skies. In November 2023, he released a collaborative Christmas album with Gillies titled We Wish You the Merriest. The lead single of the same name was dropped on the day of the announcement.

In June 2025, MacFarlane released his ninth album, Lush Life: The Lost Sinatra Arrangements. The album, conducted by John Wilson, features music originally arranged by Nelson Riddle, Billy May, and Don Costa for Frank Sinatra, but were never produced, and were discovered by MacFarlane in Sinatra's library of music material. MacFarlane released his tenth album, a cover album of songs originally recorded by the Muppets, entitled Seth MacFarlane Sings the Muppets, on September 18, 2026.

==== Collaborations ====
MacFarlane was featured on Calabria Foti's 2013 single "Let's Fall in Love". In 2016, he recorded the song "Pure Imagination" as a duet with Barbra Streisand for her album Encore: Movie Partners Sing Broadway. MacFarlane sang numerous show tunes with Ariana Grande on an episode of Carpool Karaoke: The Series in 2017.

During the COVID-19 pandemic in 2020, he and Elizabeth Gillies collaborated on eight songs for a playlist entitled Songs from Home on Spotify. MacFarlane was featured on Meghan Trainor's Christmas album, A Very Trainor Christmas, where they recorded a cover of "White Christmas". The single debuted at number 24 on the Adult Contemporary chart issued dated November 14, 2020, the third holiday entry for both, and it later peaked at number 1 on the chart. In 2023, MacFarlane was co-featured alongside Redman and Statik Selektah on the album track "Self Medication", from Logic's eighth studio album College Park.

=== Other projects ===
MacFarlane was executive producer of a 2020 feature film adapting Clive Barker's novel Books of Blood for Hulu, directed by Brannon Braga.

In 2020, he signed a $200 million deal with NBCUniversal to develop television projects for both internal and external networks, including the company's then-developing streaming service Peacock. Among these projects is The End is Nye, hosted by Bill Nye, a six-episode series exploring and explaining six apocalyptic scenarios. MacFarlane is executive producer and will make small appearances in each episode. It premiered on the service on August 25, 2022.

In January 2021, it was announced that MacFarlane had been hired to develop a reboot of The Naked Gun. After MacFarlane had previously expressed interest in casting Liam Neeson as Frank Drebin Jr. in 2015, MacFarlane was hired by the studio. Neeson revealed that MacFarlane alongside Paramount Pictures had approached him with a pitch to star in the movie. In June of the same year, Neeson stated that MacFarlane was working on a new draft of the script, with the studio additionally negotiating with MacFarlane potential role as director. He expressed excitement for the project and the opportunity to explore a more comedic role, should he decide to star in the movie; while stating that development on the project is ongoing. In October 2022, the film was greenlit with Neeson in the lead role. The film was directed by Akiva Schaffer, Dan Gregor and Doug Mand were hired to write a new draft of the script, from a previous draft with contributions from Mark Hentemann, Alec Sulkin and MacFarlane. MacFarlane and Erica Huggins served as producers.

=== Guest appearances ===
MacFarlane has appeared in sitcoms, comedy and news programs, independent films, and other animated shows. In 2002, MacFarlane appeared in the Gilmore Girls episode "Lorelai's Graduation Day". On November 5, 2006, MacFarlane guest-starred on Fox's The War at Home as "Hillary's Date", an unnamed 33-year-old man who secretly dates teenaged Hillary in the episode "I Wash My Hands of You". MacFarlane appeared as the engineer Ensign Rivers on Star Trek: Enterprise in the third-season episode "The Forgotten" and the fourth-season episode "Affliction". During 2006, MacFarlane had a role in the independent film Life is Short. He has been a frequent guest on the radio talkshow Loveline, hosted by Dr. Drew Pinsky.

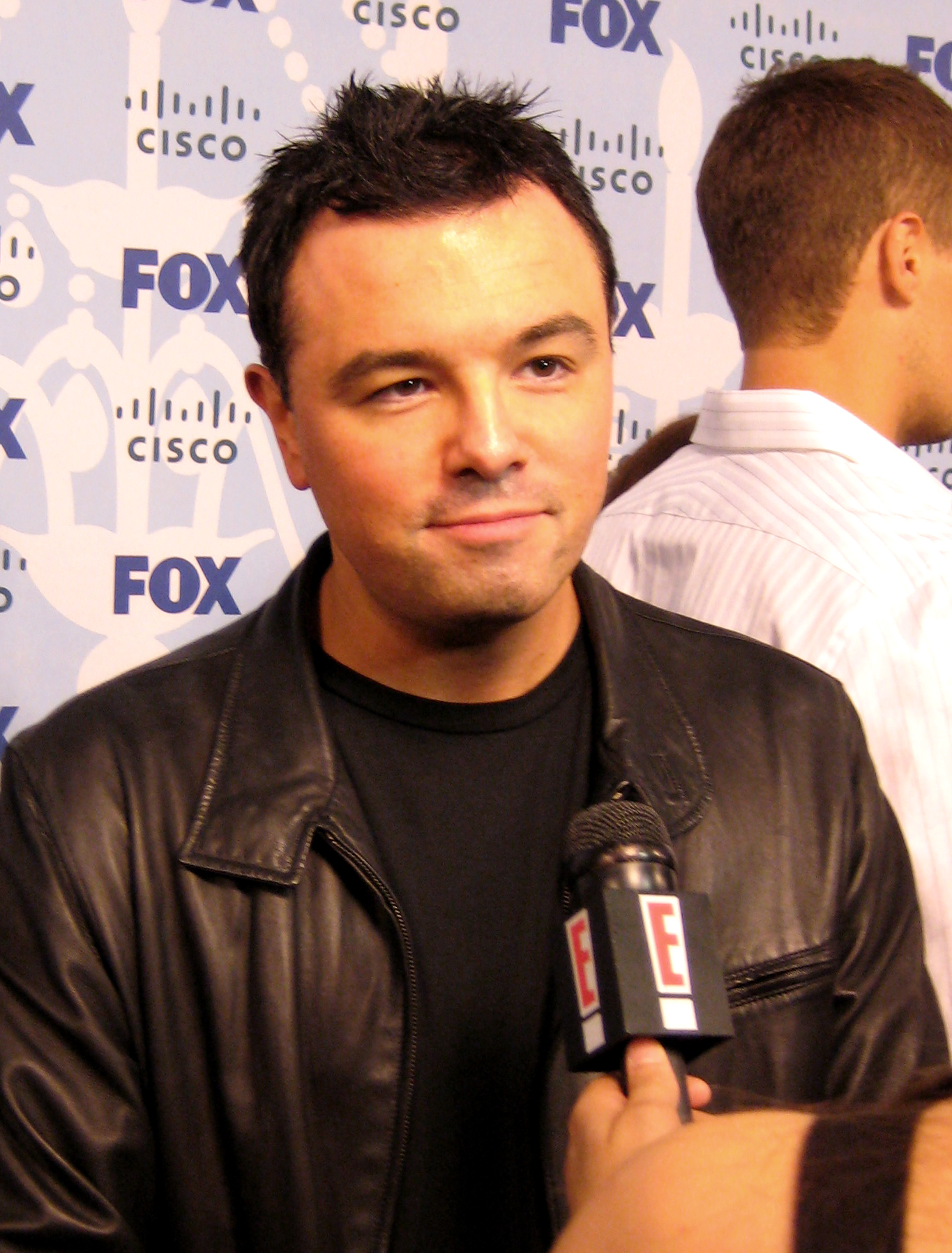
MacFarlane being interviewed at the Fox Fall Eco-Casino Party in Hollywood on September 8, 2008

MacFarlane appeared on the November 11, 2006, episode of Fox's comedy show MADtv. MacFarlane has appeared on news shows and late night television shows such as Jimmy Kimmel Live! and Late Show with David Letterman. Three months later on March 24, 2007, MacFarlane was interviewed on Fox's Talkshow with Spike Feresten, and closed the show by singing the Frank Sinatra song "You Make Me Feel So Young". He provided Stewie's voice when he appeared as a brain tumor-induced hallucination to Seeley Booth in an episode of Bones, writing his own dialogue for the episode. On May 8, 2009, MacFarlane was a guest on Real Time with Bill Maher.

Other than Family Guy and American Dad!, MacFarlane voices characters in other cartoon shows and films. He voiced Wayne "The Brain" McClain in an episode of Aqua Teen Hunger Force. He has voiced various characters on Adult Swim's Robot Chicken, including a parody of Lion-O and Emperor Palpatine as well as Peter Griffin in the Season 2 premiere – he parodied himself in the Season 4 premiere, in which he renewed the show simply by mentioning it in a Family Guy-like cutaway after its fictitious cancellation at the end of Season 3. He played the villain "The Manotaur" in Bob Boyle's animated kids series Yin Yang Yo!. In addition, MacFarlane voiced Johann Kraus in the 2008 film Hellboy II: The Golden Army. He had a guest appearance in the animated film Futurama: Into the Wild Green Yonder. He starred in a commercial for Hulu in which he plays an alien presenting Hulu as an "evil plot to destroy the world", progressively as his famous Family Guy and American Dad! characters. He lent his voice to the series finale film of the Comedy Central series Drawn Together.

MacFarlane played Ziggy in the 2010 film Tooth Fairy. In August 2010, he appeared as a guest voice-over in a sci-fi themed episode of Disney's Phineas and Ferb entitled "Nerds of a Feather". On September 15, 2012, MacFarlane hosted the season premiere of Saturday Night Live, with musical guest Frank Ocean. The episode was MacFarlane's first appearance on the show. MacFarlane had a cameo in the 2013 film Movie 43. MacFarlane collaborated with Matt Groening on an episode of The Simpsons and Futurama. In 2016, he had a voice role in the animated film Sing, as well as serving as a major performer on the film's soundtrack. In 2017, he appeared in Steven Soderbergh's heist comedy Logan Lucky, alongside Channing Tatum and Adam Driver. In 2019, MacFarlane appeared in the Showtime limited series The Loudest Voice.

== Artistry ==
=== Musical style ===
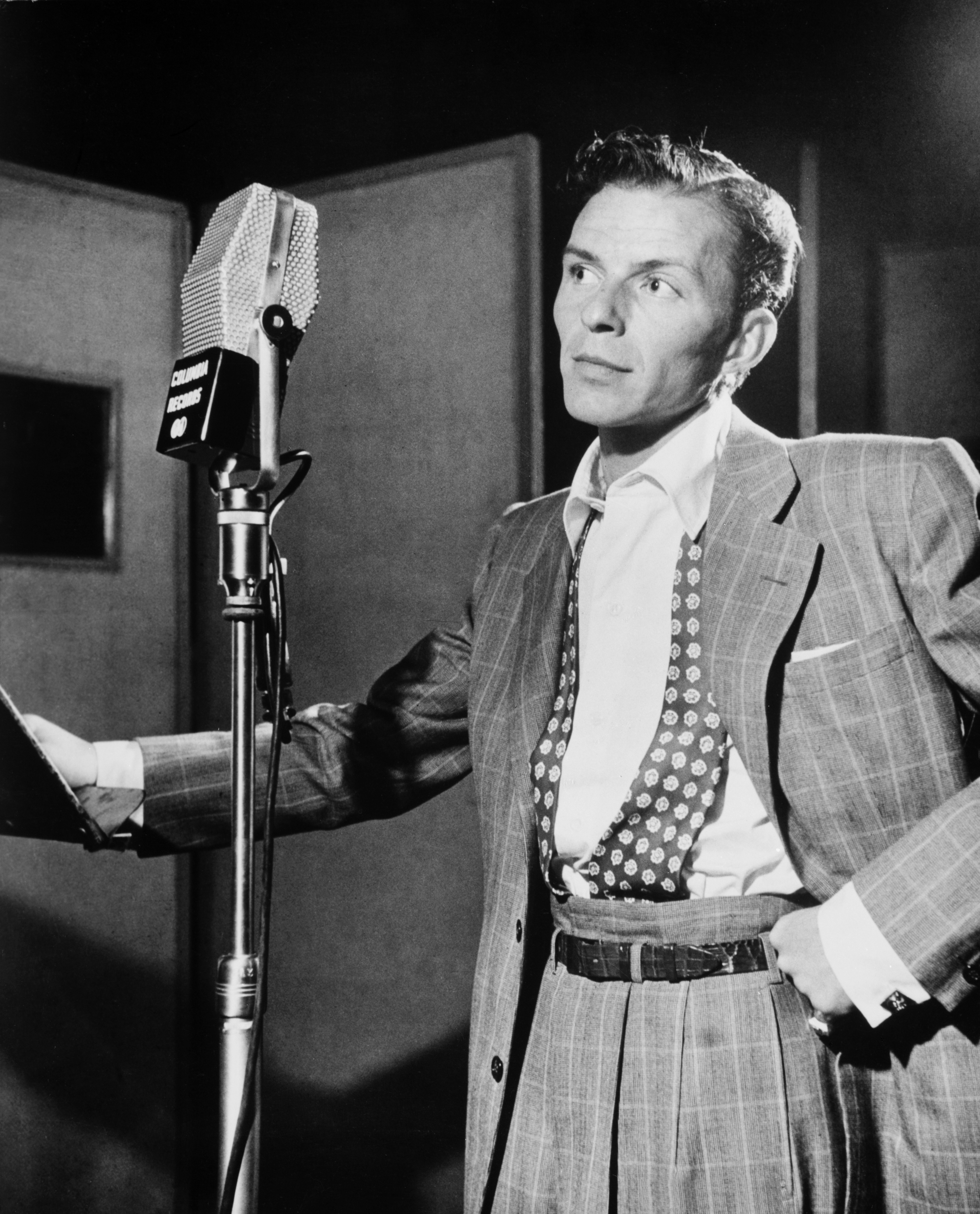
Frank Sinatra significantly influenced MacFarlane and his music.

MacFarlane has a baritone voice. He is a pianist and singer who, in his early years, trained with Lee and Sally Sweetland, the vocal coaches of Barbra Streisand and Frank Sinatra. In an interview with NPR, he commented on their training style: "They really drill you. They teach you the old-style way of singing, back when you had no electronic help ... [They teach you to] show your teeth. If you look at old photos of Sinatra while he's singing, there's a lot of very exposed teeth. That was something Lee Sweetland hit on day in and day out, and correctly so, because it just brightens the whole performance." In 2009, MacFarlane appeared as a vocalist at the BBC Proms with the John Wilson Orchestra in Prom 22, A Celebration of Classic MGM Film Musicals. In 2010, he reappeared at the Proms with the John Wilson Orchestra in a Christmas concert special. In 2012, it was announced he would again appear at the Proms with the John Wilson Orchestra in a concert celebrating Broadway musicals. In 2015, MacFarlane again appeared at The Proms as a vocalist with the John Wilson Orchestra, this time in a Sinatra program. Regarding his musical passion, MacFarlane has said, "I love and am fascinated by exciting orchestration—what you can do with a band that size—and I think in many ways it's a lost art." His music is predominantly jazz, show tunes and swing. He also uses musical comedy in his shows and movies.

=== Influences ===
MacFarlane has said that his comedy influences include Woody Allen, Jackie Gleason, Mel Brooks, Monty Python, Matt Groening, and Norman Lear; while his musical influences include Frank Sinatra, Dean Martin, Vic Damone, Johnny Mercer, Bing Crosby, Bobby Darin, Gordon MacRae and the Rat Pack.

== Activism ==
=== Political views ===
MacFarlane is a supporter of the Democratic Party. He has donated over $200,000 to various Democratic congressional committees and to the 2008 presidential campaign of then-US Senator Barack Obama. He has stated that he supports the legalization of cannabis.

In 2015, MacFarlane endorsed Bernie Sanders for the 2016 US presidential election, and he introduced Sanders onstage at a Los Angeles rally. After the primaries, he supported Hillary Clinton for president during the general election. In 2019, he supported Pete Buttigieg in the 2020 US presidential election. After the primaries, he endorsed Joe Biden for president during the general election. He endorsed Biden again for the 2024 US presidential election. After Biden withdrew his candidacy, MacFarlane endorsed Kamala Harris.

=== Gay rights advocacy ===
MacFarlane is a supporter of gay rights. In 2008, prior to the holding of the Obergefell v. Hodges case by the United States Supreme Court, MacFarlane called it "infuriating and idiotic" that two gay partners "have to go through this fucking dog and pony act when they stop at a hotel and the guy behind the counter says, 'You want one room or two?'" He went on to say: "I'm incredibly passionate about my support for the gay community and what they're dealing with at this current point in time."

In recognition of "his active, passionate commitment to humanist values, and his fearless support of equal marriage rights and other social justice issues", MacFarlane was named the Harvard Humanist of the Year in 2011.

=== Speaking engagements ===
MacFarlane is a frequent speaking guest on college campuses. On April 16, 2006, he was invited by Stanford University's ASSU Speakers' Bureau to address an audience of over 1,000 at Memorial Auditorium. He was invited by Harvard University's class of 2006 to deliver the address at "class day," which is a rough equivalent of graduation day, on June 7, 2006. He spoke as himself, and also as Peter Griffin, Stewie Griffin, and Glenn Quagmire. He has also spoken at George Washington University, Washington University in St. Louis, the University of Texas at Austin, the University of Missouri, Bowling Green State University, Loyola Marymount University, and University of California, Los Angeles.

=== 2007–08 Writers Guild of America strike ===
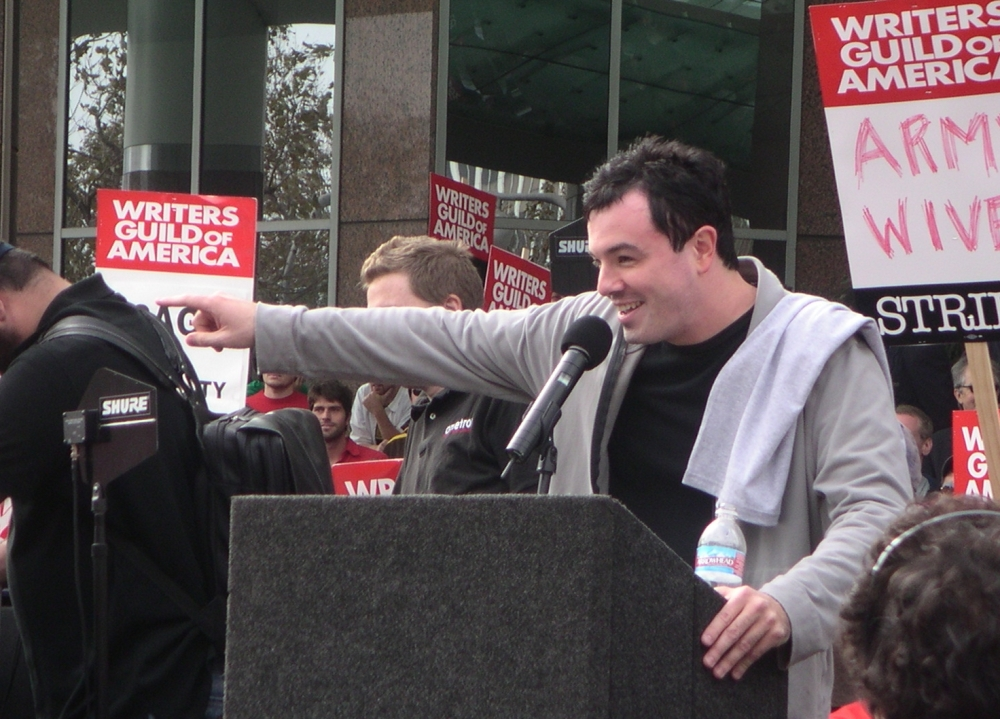
MacFarlane speaking at a Writers Guild of America rally in Culver City on November 9, 2007

During the 2007–08 Writers Guild of America strike, MacFarlane publicly sided with the Writers Guild and fully participated in the strike. Official production of Family Guy was halted for most of December 2007 and various periods afterwards. Fox continued producing episodes without MacFarlane's final approval, and although he refused to work on the show during the strike, his contract with Fox required him to contribute to any episodes it subsequently produced. Rumors of continued production on Family Guy prompted the statement from MacFarlane that "it would just be a colossal dick move if they did that". During the strike, MacFarlane wrote an inside joke into an episode of Family Guy about Jon Stewart's choice to return to the air and undermine the writers of The Daily Show, causing Stewart to respond with an angry phone call, harassing MacFarlane and arguing his point. The strike ended on February 12, 2008.

=== 2023 WGA and SAG-AFTRA strike ===
During the 2023 Writers Guild of America strike and the 2023 SAG-AFTRA strike, MacFarlane donated $1 million to The Entertainment Community Fund to Support Film and Television Workers During Strikes. The Entertainment Community, formerly The Actors Fund, is there to help provide financial assistance for industry workers during the SAG-AFTRA and WGA strikes.

=== The Seth MacFarlane Collection of the Carl Sagan and Ann Druyan Archive ===
In 2012, MacFarlane donated money to create The Seth MacFarlane Collection of the Carl Sagan and Ann Druyan Archive at the Library of Congress. MacFarlane said, "The work of Carl Sagan has been a profound influence in my life, and the life of every individual who recognizes the importance of humanity's ongoing commitment to the exploration of our universe [...] The continuance of our journey outward into space should always occupy some part of our collective attention (...)" The collection opened on November 12, 2013.

=== Film preservation ===
On April 20, 2024, MacFarlane partnered with Martin Scorsese to showcase Back from the Ink: Restored Animated Shorts at the 2024 TCM Classic Film Festival. MacFarlane and Scorsese funded the restoration and worked with the UCLA Film and Television Archive and The Film Foundation with Paramount Pictures Archives.

== Personal life ==
MacFarlane lives in Beverly Hills, California. He is not married and has no children. From 2012 to 2013, he was in a relationship with British actress Emilia Clarke.

MacFarlane gave a speech at his alma mater, the Rhode Island School of Design, on September 10, 2001; the next morning he was scheduled to return to Los Angeles on American Airlines Flight 11, one of the planes hijacked in the September 11 attacks. Due to a hangover after the previous night's celebrations and an incorrect departure time (8:15 a.m. instead of 7:45 a.m.) from his travel agent, he arrived at Logan International Airport about ten minutes too late to board the flight, as the gates had been closed. Speaking of his experience of missing the fatal trip, MacFarlane said:

The only reason it hasn't really affected me as it maybe could have is I didn't really know that I was in any danger until after it was over, so I never had that panic moment. After the fact, it was sobering, but people have a lot of close calls; you're crossing the street and you almost get hit by a car... This one just happened to be related to something massive. I really can't let it affect me because I'm a comedy writer. I have to put that in the back of my head.

On July 16, 2010, MacFarlane's mother, Ann Perry Sager, died from cancer. Her death was reported by Larry King on his show Larry King Live, who acknowledged a conversation he had with her during an interview with MacFarlane in May 2010.

MacFarlane is an atheist, explaining his beliefs, "I do not believe in God. I'm an atheist. I consider myself a critical thinker, and it fascinates me that in the 21st century most people still believe in, as George Carlin puts it, 'the invisible man living in the sky'."

== Lawsuits ==
On October 3, 2007, Bourne Co. Music Publishers filed a lawsuit accusing Family Guy of infringing its copyright on the song "When You Wish Upon a Star", through a parody song titled "I Need a Jew" appearing in the episode "When You Wish Upon a Weinstein". Bourne Co., which holds the copyright, alleged the parody pairs a "thinly veiled" copy of their music with antisemitic lyrics. Named in the suit were MacFarlane, 20th Century Fox Film Corp., Fox Broadcasting Co., Cartoon Network and Walter Murphy; the suit sought to stop the program's distribution and asked for unspecified damages. Bourne argued that "I Need a Jew" uses the copyrighted melody of "When You Wish Upon a Star" without commenting on that song, and that it was therefore not a First Amendment-protected parody per the ruling in Campbell v. Acuff-Rose Music, Inc. On March 16, 2009, United States District Judge Deborah Batts held that Family Guy did not infringe on Bourne's copyright when it transformed the song for comical use in an episode.

In December 2007, Family Guy was again accused of copyright infringement when actor Art Metrano filed a lawsuit regarding a scene in Stewie Griffin: The Untold Story, in which Jesus performs Metrano's signature magic parody act, involving absurd faux magical hand gestures while humming the distinctive tune "Fine and Dandy". MacFarlane, 20th Century Fox, Steve Callaghan, and Alex Borstein were all named in the suit. In July 2009, a federal district court judge rejected Fox's motion to dismiss, saying that the first three fair use factors involved—"purpose and character of the use", "nature of the infringed work", and "amount and substantiality of the taking"—counted in Metrano's favor, while the fourth—"economic impact"—had to await more fact-finding. In denying the dismissal, the court held that the reference in the scene made light of Jesus and his followers—not Metrano or his act. The case was settled out of court in 2010 with undisclosed terms.

On July 16, 2014, MacFarlane was served with a lawsuit from the production company of a series of Internet videos called Charlie the Abusive Teddy Bear claiming that Ted infringes on the copyright of its videos due to the Ted bear largely matching the background story, persona, voice tone, attitude, and dialogue of the Charlie bear. The suit was dismissed with prejudice on March 23, 2015, after the plaintiffs conceded Ted was independently created and withdrew the suit.

== Awards and nominations ==
MacFarlane has been nominated for twenty-four Primetime Emmy Awards for his work on Family Guy and has won five times, in 2000, 2002, 2016, 2017 and 2019. He has been nominated for five Grammy Awards for his work in Family Guy: Live in Vegas, Music Is Better Than Words, Family Guy, No One Ever Tells You and In Full Swing. He was nominated for an Academy Award for Best Original Song for co-writing the opening song, "Everybody Needs a Best Friend", from his film Ted with the film's composer Walter Murphy.

He has received numerous awards from other organizations, including the Annie Award for Best Voice Acting in an Animated Television Production and the Saturn Award for Best Television Presentation for the Family Guy episode titled "Blue Harvest", the MTV Movie Award for Best On-Screen Duo and the Empire Award for Best Comedy for Ted. In 2019, MacFarlane received a star on the Hollywood Walk of Fame at 6259 Hollywood Blvd. In 2020, he was inducted into the Television Hall of Fame.

In 2022, a new species of Hyloscirtus frog native to Ecuador was named Hyloscirtus sethmacfarlanei after him.

== Filmography ==
- Stewie Griffin: The Untold Story (2005)
- Hellboy II: The Golden Army (2008)
- Futurama: Into the Wild Green Yonder (2009)
- The Drawn Together Movie: The Movie! (2010)
- Tooth Fairy (2010)
- Ted (2012)
- Movie 43 (2013)
- A Million Ways to Die in the West (2014)
- Ted 2 (2015)
- Sing (2016)
- Logan Lucky (2017)

== Discography ==
- Music Is Better Than Words (2011)
- Holiday for Swing (2014)
- No One Ever Tells You (2015)
- In Full Swing (2017)
- Once in a While (2019)
- Great Songs from Stage & Screen (2020)
- Blue Skies (2022)
- We Wish You the Merriest (with Elizabeth Gillies) (2023)
- Lush Life: The Lost Sinatra Arrangements (2025)
- Seth MacFarlane Sings the Muppets (2026)

== Written works ==
- MacFarlane, Seth (2014). A Million Ways to Die in the West. New York: Ballantine Books. ISBN 978-0-553-39167-1.
- MacFarlane, Seth (2022). The Orville: Sympathy for the Devil. Hyperion Avenue. ISBN 978-1-368-09263-0.
