= We Wish You the Merriest =

2023 album by Seth MacFarlane and Elizabeth Gillies

Studio album by Seth MacFarlane and Elizabeth Gillies
- Released: November 3, 2023
- Studio: Abbey Road Studios
- Genre: Christmas; traditional pop; swing; big band
- Length: 39:13
- Label: Republic; Verve; Fuzzy Door
- Producer: Joel McNeely; Seth MacFarlane

Seth MacFarlane and Elizabeth Gillies chronology
Songs from Home (2021)	We Wish You the Merriest (2023)

Seth MacFarlane chronology
Blue Skies (2022)	We Wish You the Merriest (2023)	Lush Life: The Lost Sinatra Arrangements (2025)

Singles from We Wish You the Merriest
- 1. "We Wish You the Merriest" Released: September 28, 2023; 2. "Sleigh Ride" Released: October 19, 2023

We Wish You the Merriest is the second collaborative album by American actors and singers Seth MacFarlane and Elizabeth Gillies. The album was released on November 3, 2023, through Republic Records and Verve Records. It is MacFarlane's eighth studio album and second Christmas album, in addition to Gillies's debut album.

The album marks the second collaboration between MacFarlane and Gillies after their extended play (EP), Songs from Home (2021). MacFarlane reunited with his frequent collaborator Joel McNeely to produce the album. The album was preceded by the release of two singles: the title track and "Sleigh Ride".

== Background ==
On September 28, 2023, it was announced that MacFarlane would collaborate with Elizabeth Gillies on a Christmas album. The album marked a second collaboration, after their 2021 EP, Songs from Home. Gillies said, "After collaborating for nearly a decade, I was beyond thrilled when Seth came to me with the idea of recording a holiday record. Our first official record. There is no one I know who possesses a deeper knowledge and appreciation for this era of music than Seth." MacFarlane himself also spoke about the collaboration saying, "Liz and I have been singing together for a number of years now, between studio recordings and traveling around the country performing live with some of our favorite symphony orchestras. We're both fans of the classic Bing Crosby-Rosemary Clooney duet albums, and their exquisite, expressive orchestrations contrasting with a fun, casual vocal style. We've done our best to honor that tradition with our new Christmas album, and we hope it adds some extra charm to your holiday season."

MacFarlane reunited with Andrew Cottee again, after previously working on Once in a While (2019) and Blue Skies (2022). He recorded the album at Abbey Road Studios, his seventh time at the recording studio.

== Promotions ==
=== Singles ===
The album's lead single, "We Wish You the Merriest", was released on September 28, 2023. The album's second and final single, "Sleigh Ride", was released on October 19, 2023.

=== Live performances ===
MacFarlane and Gillies performed at the McCallum Theatre in Palm Desert, California on December 5, 2023. They also had a show at the Smith Center for the Performing Arts in Las Vegas on December 30, 2023.

The duo also performed at Rockefeller Center during the Christmas Tree lighting special on November 29, 2023. On December 1, 2024, they performed at Disneyland as part of The Wonderful World of Disney: Holiday Spectacular.

== Commercial performance ==
We Wish You the Merriest debuted at number 20 on the US Billboard Jazz Albums and number 47 on the Top Holiday Albums charts with 1,000 album-equivalent units.

== Track listing ==
We Wish You the Merriest track listing
No.	Title	Writer(s)	Length
1.	"Happy Holiday"	Irving Berlin	2:39
2.	"Frosty the Snowman"	Jack Rollins; Steve Nelson	2:41
3.	"Here Comes Santa Claus"	Oakley Haldeman; Gene Autry	2:28
4.	"Sleigh Ride"	Leroy Anderson; Mitchell Parish	3:18
5.	"The Christmas Song"	Robert Wells; Mel Tormé	4:06
6.	"Rudolph the Red-Nosed Reindeer"	Johnny Marks	2:24
7.	"That Holiday Feeling"	Joe Guercio; Bill Jacob; Patty Jacob	2:36
8.	"Winter Wonderland"	Richard Bernhard Smith; Felix Bernard	3:32
9.	"Have Yourself a Merry Little Christmas"	Hugh Martin; Ralph Blane	4:54
10.	"Santa Claus Is Comin' to Town"	John Frederick Coots; Haven Gillespie	3:09
11.	"Christmas Time All Over the World"	Martin	2:40
12.	"A Holly Jolly Christmas"	Marks	2:28
13.	"We Wish You the Merriest"	Les Brown	2:26
Total length:			39:13

== Personnel ==
Credits adapted from Tidal.

- Seth MacFarlane – vocals and producer
- Elizabeth Gillies – vocals
- Joel McNeely – producer
- Dan Higgins – alto saxophone
- Howard McGill – alto saxophone
- Claire McInerney – baritone saxophone
- Chuck Berghofer – bass guitar
- Dominic Tyler – bassoon
- Jonathan Davies – bassoon
- Paul Boyes – bassoon
- Simon Estelle – bassoon
- Benjamin Hughes – cello
- Katherine Jenkinson – cello
- Leo Popplewell – cello
- Richard Harwood – cello
- Dan Higgins – clarinet
- Michael Whight – clarinet
- Andrew Cottee – arranger and conductor
- Benjamin Griffiths – double bass
- Samuel Becker – double bass
- Peter Erskine – drums
- George Oulton – engineer
- Joy Fehily – executive producer
- Clare Childs – flute
- Juliette Bausor – flute
- Larry Koonse – guitar
- Sally Pryce – harp
- Diego Incertis – horn
- Joel Ashford – horn
- Dave Collins – mastering engineer
- Rich Breen – recording and mixing engineer
- John Anderson – oboe
- Maxwell Spiers – oboe
- Andrew Barclay – percussion
- Karen Hutt – percussion
- Oliver Yates – percussion
- Paul Stoneman – percussion
- Tom Ranier – piano
- Neil Dawes – second engineer
- Luke Annersley – tenor saxophone
- Mark Crooks – tenor saxophone
- Gordon Campbell – trombone
- Jonathan Stokes – trombone
- Peter North – trombone
- Robert Harvey – trombone
- Andrew Gathercole – trumpet
- James Lynch – trumpet
- Michael Lovatt – trumpet
- Patrick White – trumpet
- Alistair Scahill – viola
- Benjamin Newton – viola
- Duncan Anderson – viola
- Meghan Cassidy – viola
- Nicholas Bootiman – viola
- Andrew Harvey – violin
- Anna Liisa Bezrodny – violin
- Beatrice Philips – violin
- Deborah White – violin
- Eloisa-Fleur Thom – violin
- Francesca Barritt – violin
- Greta Mutlu – violin
- Ilhem Ben Khalfa – violin
- Jens LynenKate Cole – violin
- Laura Samuel – violin
- Marciana Buta – violin
- Maya Iwabuchi – violin
- Michael Jones – violin
- Nicole Wilson – violin
- Rowan Bell – violin
- Shlomy Dobrinsky – violin
- Sophie Lockett – violin

== Charts ==
Chart performance for We Wish You the Merriest
Chart (2023)	Peak position
US Top Holiday Albums (Billboard)	47
US Top Jazz Albums (Billboard)	20

== Release history ==
Release history and formats for We Wish You the Merriest
Region	Date	Format(s)	Label	Ref.
Various	November 3, 2023	Digital download; streaming; CD; vinyl	Republic; Verve; Fuzzy Door Productions	
