= Lush Life: The Lost Sinatra Arrangements =

Studio album by Seth MacFarlane
- Released: June 6, 2025
- Studio: Skywalker Sound
- Genres: Traditional pop; easy listening; swing; big band
- Length: 37:36
- Labels: Republic; Verve; Fuzzy Door
- Producers: Joel McNeely; Seth MacFarlane

Seth MacFarlane chronology
We Wish You the Merriest (2023)	Lush Life: The Lost Sinatra Arrangements (2025)	Seth MacFarlane Sings the Muppets (2026)

Singles from Lush Life: The Lost Sinatra Arrangements
- 1. "Lush Life" Released: April 23, 2025; 2. "Give Me the Simple Life" Released: May 19, 2025

Lush Life: The Lost Sinatra Arrangements is the ninth studio album by American actor and singer Seth MacFarlane. The album was released on June 6, 2025, through Republic Records and Verve Records. MacFarlane reunited with his frequent collaborator Joel McNeely to produce the album. The album's lead single, "Lush Life", was released digitally on April 23, 2025. The album is a tribute to Frank Sinatra, a major influence on MacFarlane's music, which features a dozen arrangements of songs that Sinatra had planned to perform but never did.

The album received a nomination for Best Arrangement, Instrumental and Vocals at the 68th Annual Grammy Awards.

== Background ==
In 2018, MacFarlane acquired the entire Sinatra music archive from the Sinatra family and estate. Tina Sinatra, the daughter of Frank Sinatra, said the following, "Seth's interest and knowledge of my father's music is boundless. With arrangements by the masters, Nelson Riddle, Billy May and Don Costa, we can only wonder why these songs went un-produced. Thanks to Seth, we can now enjoy these lost Sinatra arrangements." Shortly after, MacFarlane and Joel McNeely hired an orchestra over on the Fox Studio Lot and went through the arrangements. McNeely described the experience, "This was the first one we read when we had a sight-reading session at Fox. We got an orchestra together just to see what was there, you know, because there was nothing to reference. But all this time later, these little black pencil dots on paper, there's his voice brought back to life. I mean, it was chilling." He recorded the album at George Lucas' Skywalker Sound. MacFarlane collaborated with conductor John Wilson, whom he has performed with before in the BBC Proms in 2009, 2010, 2012, and 2015.

Some of the songs were written for Sinatra's albums but were cut like "How Did She Look?," was intended for Only the Lonely, "Flying Down to Rio," was to be included in Come Fly with Me and "Shadows" was intended for Moonlight Sinatra but ultimately rejected. Several tracks on the album are familiar songs, but in previously unrecorded arrangements like "Give Me the Simple Life", "On a Wonderful Day Like Today" and "Arrivederci, Roma" for which MacFarlane wrote new lyrics. He explained his reasoning, "there was an Italian verse — the English refrain was already written, had been sung by many artists — but the verse was all in Italian. I don't know that Sinatra would've sung it that way. I remember Dean Martin singing a lot in Italian, but not Sinatra. And I certainly didn't want to subject anyone to my attempt. So we had it translated, and I wrote a new lyric for that verse based on the translated content. Hopefully, it blends well with the lyrics that already exist. That was one of the few bits of writing I had to do." According to MacFarlane, because of the extensive songs from the library, several songs were cut. He said, "There are a couple [songs] that we recorded that we cut from this album, just because we had, I don't know, some edict to get it down to 12 songs or less. All I know is we were told initially, I think they wanted it to be like six songs. I'm, like, 'Guys, that's not an album.' I don't know, there's all this, like, marketing data that they go by, and really, nobody knows sh–, because if they did, everything would be a monster hit."

== Promotions ==
=== Singles ===
The album’s first single is Billy Strayhorn’s "Lush Life", which features Nelson Riddle’s original conceptual arrangement, was released on April 23, 2025. The album's second single "Give Me the Simple Life" was released on May 19, 2025.

=== Live performances ===
MacFarlane performed at Voltaire at The Venetian Las Vegas on July 3–5, 2025. He also performed at the Symphony Hall in Boston on December 31, 2025 and the Walt Disney Concert Hall on February 17, 2026.

== Track listing ==
Lush Life: The Lost Sinatra Arrangements track listing
No.	Title	Writer(s)	Length
1.	"Give Me the Simple Life"	Rube Bloom; Harry Ruby	2:31
2.	"I Never Felt This Way Before"	Al Dubin	2:33
3.	"Lush Life"	Billy Strayhorn	3:59
4.	"Flying Down to Rio"	Vincent Youmans; Gus Kahn; Edward Eliscu	2:20
5.	"How Did She Look?"	Abner Silver; Gladys Shelley	3:56
6.	"Who's in Your Arms Tonight?"	Harry Warren; Mack Gordon	3:20
7.	"A Wonderful Day like Today"	Leslie Bricusse; Anthony Newley	3:07
8.	"When Joanna Loved Me"	Jack Segal; Robert Wells	3:22
9.	"Arrivederci Roma"	Renato Rascel; Carl Sigman	3:04
10.	"Hurry Home"	Buddy Bernier; Robert D. Emmerick; Joseph Meyer	4:00
11.	"Ain'tcha Ever Comin' Back"	Axel Stordahl; Paul Weston; Irving Taylor	2:06
12.	"Shadows"	Erroll Garner	3:11
Total length:			37:36

== Personnel ==
Credits adapted from Tidal.

- Seth MacFarlane – vocals and producer
- Joel McNeely – producer
- Nick Ariondo – accordion
- Chuck Berghofer – bass guitar
- Rose Corrigon – bassoon
- Ben Lash – cello
- Charlie Tyler – cello
- Jonathan Aasgaard – cello
- Tim Love – cello
- Ann Sheridan – choir vocals
- Baraka May – choir vocals
- David Loucks – choir vocals
- Dylan Gentile – choir vocals
- Jarrett Johnson – choir vocals
- Michael Lichtenauer – choir vocals
- Natalie Babbitt Taylor – choir vocals
- Suzanne Waters – choir vocals
- Valerie Tambaoan – choir vocals
- Benjamin Mellefont – clarinet
- John Wilson – conductor
- David Grossman – double bass
- Phillip Nelson – double bass
- Ryan Gilruth - quadruple bass & pornographic material consultant
- Peter Erskine – drums
- Charlotte Ashton – flute
- Dylan Hart – French horn
- Laura Brenes – French horn
- Teag Reaves – French horn
- George Doering – guitar
- Freddie McGabe - Very vigorous trumpet polisher
- Larry Koonse – guitar
- Marcia Dickstein – harp
- Lelie Resnick – oboe
- Tom Blomfield – oboe
- Wade Culbreath – percussion, timpani
- Thomas Ranier – piano
- Brian Scanlon – saxophone
- Chad Smith – saxophone
- Dan Higgins – saxophone
- Rusty Higgins – saxophone
- Sal Lozano – saxophone
- Andy Wood – trombone
- Jon Stokes – trombone
- Pete North – trombone
- Tom Dunnett – trombone
- Chris Snead – trumpet
- James Davison – trumpet
- Michael Craig Davis – trumpet
- Russell Bennett – trumpet
- Douglas Tornquist – tuba
- Jonah Sirota – viola
- Luke Turell – viola
- Rob Brophy – viola
- Vicci Wardman – viola
- Charlie Lovell-Jones – violin
- Ciaran McCabe – violin
- Jens Lynen – violin
- Jessica Guideri – violin
- John Mills – violin
- Michael Siess – violin
- Michael Trainor – violin
- Misha Vayman – violin
- Roberto Ruisi – violin
- Steven Wilkie – violin
- Tamara Hatwan – violin
- Tereza Stanislav – violin
- Nelson Riddle – work arrangements
- Billy May – work arrangements
- Don Costa – work arrangements

== Charts ==
Chart performance for Lush Life: The Lost Sinatra Arrangements
Chart (2025)	Peak position
US Top Album Sales (Billboard)	17
US Top Jazz Albums (Billboard)	4

== Release history ==
Release history and formats for Lush Life: The Lost Sinatra Arrangements
Region	Date	Format(s)	Label	Ref.
Various	June 6, 2025	Digital download; streaming; CD; vinyl	Republic; Verve; Fuzzy Door Productions	
