= Fuzzy Door Productions =

American film and television production company

Fuzzy Door Productions, Inc.
- Logo used since 2019
- Type: Private
- Industry: Film; Television; Music
- Founded: July 31, 1998; 28 years ago
- Founder: Seth MacFarlane
- Headquarters: Universal City, California, U.S.
- Key people: Seth MacFarlane (CCO); Erica Huggins (president); Aimee Carlson (SVP); Jason Clark (president, Production)
- Products: Family Guy; American Dad! Ted; The Orville
- Divisions: Fuzzy Door Tech
- Subsidiaries: Underdog Productions
- Website: fuzzydoor.com

Fuzzy Door Productions, Inc., or credited as Fuzzy Door on-screen since 2019, is an American film and television production company founded by Seth MacFarlane on July 31, 1998. The company's productions include the animated sitcoms Family Guy and American Dad!, the Family Guy spin-off The Cleveland Show, the live-action sitcom The Winner, the science documentary series Cosmos: A Spacetime Odyssey, and the sci-fi comedy drama series The Orville. Established as part of 20th Century Studios, the company signed a deal with NBCUniversal in 2020, subsequently basing its headquarters at Universal City Studios in Universal City, and naming Erica Huggins as its president that same year.

MacFarlane's animated series, Family Guy and American Dad!, have been produced at 20th Television Animation, while his live-action series, The Orville, was filmed at the studio's Universal City headquarters and in Westlake, California.

The name of the company comes from the leopard-printed fake fur-covered door to the house MacFarlane lived in when he attended Rhode Island School of Design as an undergraduate in animation. The house itself also went by the nickname the Fuzzy Door during MacFarlane's residence and was the location of many "Fuzzy Door" parties. The company's logo was designed by Cory Brookes, a friend and housemate of MacFarlane's at the Fuzzy Door residence. The logo was updated in 2019, featuring a more abstract design of the door and no longer featuring the leopard fur-pattern design, instead it is colored in a plain white door with a blue background, or vice-versa colors. In 2020, the new logo was enhanced, featuring the door animating open and the text irising in as it does so, over a background that has a darker shade of blue.

== Filmography ==
=== Series ===
==== Television series ====
Title	Creator(s)	Years active	Original network(s)	Co-production company(s)	Notes
Animated
Family Guy	Seth MacFarlane	1999–2000; 2001–2002; 2005–present	Fox	20th Television (seasons 1–19)	"When You Wish Upon a Weinstein" first released on Volume 2 DVD before airing on Adult Swim in 2003 and on Fox in 2004; "Partial Terms of Endearment" – banned by Fox – broadcast in the UK and released on DVD in the USA; four episodes released exclusively on Hulu
Family Guy	Seth MacFarlane	1999–2000; 2001–2002; 2005–present	Fox	20th Television Animation (season 20–present)	"When You Wish Upon a Weinstein" first released on Volume 2 DVD before airing on Adult Swim in 2003 and on Fox in 2004; "Partial Terms of Endearment" – banned by Fox – broadcast in the UK and released on DVD in the USA; four episodes released exclusively on Hulu
American Dad!	Seth MacFarlane; Mike Barker; Matt Weitzman	2005–present	Fox (2005–2014; 2026–)	Underdog Productions, 20th Television (seasons 1–18)	
American Dad!	Seth MacFarlane; Mike Barker; Matt Weitzman	2005–present	TBS (2014–2025)	20th Television Animation (season 19–present)	
The Cleveland Show	Seth MacFarlane; Richard Appel; Mike Henry	2009–2013	Fox	Persons Unknown Productions, Happy Jack Productions, and 20th Century Fox Television	Spin-off of Family Guy
Bordertown	Mark Hentemann	2016	Fox	Hentemann Films and 20th Century Fox Television	
Good Times: Black Again	Ranada Shepard; Carl Jones	2024	Netflix	Coco Cubana Productions, Act III Productions, Unanimous Media, and Sony Pictures Television Studios	Based on Good Times
Ted: The Animated Series	Seth MacFarlane	2026	Peacock	Universal Content Productions and MRC Television	Sequel to the Ted films
Stewie	Seth MacFarlane; Kirker Butler	2027 or 2028	Fox	20th Television Animation	Spin-off of Family Guy
Live-action
The Winner	Ricky Blitt	2007	Fox	Candy Bar Productions and 20th Century Fox Television	
Dads	Alec Sulkin; Wellesley Wild	2013–2014	Fox	20th Century Fox Television	
Cosmos: A Spacetime Odyssey	Ann Druyan; Steven Soter	2014	Fox; National Geographic Channel	Cosmos Studios and Santa Fe Studios	Follow-up to Cosmos: A Personal Voyage
Blunt Talk	Jonathan Ames	2015–2016	Starz	Media Rights Capital and The Herring Wonder	
The Orville	Seth MacFarlane	2017–2022	Fox (2017–2019); Hulu (2022)	20th Television	
The Long Road Home	Mikko Alanne	2017	National Geographic Channel	Phoenix Pictures and Finngate Television	Miniseries
Cosmos: Possible Worlds	Ann Druyan	2020	Fox; National Geographic Channel	Cosmos Studios	Third season of Cosmos after "A Personal Voyage" and "A Spacetime Odyssey"
The At-Home Variety Show Featuring Seth MacFarlane	Seth MacFarlane	2020	Peacock	Universal Content Productions and Jax Media	
The End is Nye	Bill Nye; Seth MacFarlane; Brannon Braga	2022	Peacock	Beetlecod Productions, Universal Television Alternative Studio, and Universal Content Productions	
Ted	Seth MacFarlane	2024–2026	Peacock	Universal Content Productions and MRC Television	Prequel to the Ted films
The 'Burbs	Celeste Hughey	2026	Peacock	Imagine Entertainment, Out of the Blue Productions, and Universal Content Productions	Based on the film of the same name
Dungeon Crawler Carl	Christopher Yost	TBA	Peacock	Universal Global Television	Based on the book series of the same name
Future Housewives	Brannon Braga	TBA	Peacock	Universal Global Television and Over Fences	
The Shrouded College	Seth MacFarlane	TBA	Peacock	Universal Global Television	Based on the graphic novel series
The Winds of War	Seth MacFarlane; Seth Fisher	TBA	TBA	Universal Global Television	Based on the novel of the same name

==== Web series ====
Title	Creator(s)	Years active	Original network(s)	Notes
Seth MacFarlane's Cavalcade of Cartoon Comedy	Seth MacFarlane	2008–2009	YouTube	Co-production with Media Rights Capital and Main Street Pictures

=== Films ===
Year	Title	Director(s)	Distributor	Notes
Animated
2005	Stewie Griffin: The Untold Story	Pete Michels	20th Century Fox Home Entertainment	Direct-to-video; co-production with 20th Century Fox
TBA	Untitled Family Guy film	TBA	20th Century Studios	Co-production with 20th Century Animation and 20th Television Animation
Live Action
2012	Ted	Seth MacFarlane	Universal Pictures	Co-production with Media Rights Capital, Bluegrass Films and Smart Entertainment; First film distributed by Universal Pictures
2014	A Million Ways to Die in the West	Seth MacFarlane	Universal Pictures	Co-production with MRC and Bluegrass Films
2015	Ted 2	Seth MacFarlane	Universal Pictures	Co-production with MRC and Bluegrass Films
2020	Books of Blood	Brannon Braga	Hulu	Television film; co-production with Touchstone Television
2025	The Naked Gun	Akiva Schaffer	Paramount Pictures	
TBA	Revenge of the Nerds	TBA	20th Century Studios	

==== Short films ====
Title	Director(s)	Release date	Initial release	Notes
The New CIA	Seth MacFarlane	April 8, 2005	Fever Pitch	Co-production with 20th Century Fox and Fox Television Animation

== Discography ==
- No One Ever Tells You (2015) – Seth MacFarlane
- In Full Swing (2017) – Seth MacFarlane
- Once in a While (2019) – Seth MacFarlane
- Great Songs from Stage & Screen (2020) — Seth MacFarlane
- Blue Skies (2022) – Seth MacFarlane
- We Wish You the Merriest (2023) – Seth MacFarlane and Elizabeth Gillies
- Lush Life: The Lost Sinatra Arrangements (2025) — Seth MacFarlane
- Seth MacFarlane Sings the Muppets (2026) - Seth MacFarlane and Elizabeth Gillies
