= In Full Swing (Seth MacFarlane album) =

Studio album by Seth MacFarlane
- Released: September 15, 2017
- Recorded: May 20–30, 2016
- Studio: Abbey Road Studios
- Genres: Traditional pop; vocal jazz; swing; big band
- Length: 48:48
- Labels: Republic; Verve; Fuzzy Door
- Producers: Joel McNeely; Seth MacFarlane

Seth MacFarlane chronology
No One Ever Tells You (2015)	In Full Swing (2017)	Once in a While (2019)

Singles from In Full Swing
- 1. "That Face" Released: August 17, 2017; 2. "Almost Like Being in Love" Released: August 28, 2017; 3. "Have You Met Miss Jones?" Released: September 7, 2017

In Full Swing is the fourth studio album by American actor and singer Seth MacFarlane. It was released on September 15, 2017, through Republic Records and Verve Records. The record was primarily produced by Joel McNeely and MacFarlane. Featured artists included on the album are American singer-songwriter Norah Jones and American actress and singer Elizabeth Gillies.

The album received two nominations at the 60th Annual Grammy Awards for Best Traditional Pop Vocal Album and Best Arrangement, Instrumental and Vocals.

== Background ==
On May 23, 2016, MacFarlane announced on his Twitter account that he was recording songs for his new album. On May 28, 2016, he revealed that the songs on the album were arranged by Joel McNeely, whom he had worked with on the previous three albums. On May 30, 2016, MacFarlane revealed that it was his final day of recording at Abbey Road Studios and thanked all the musicians who collaborated with him on the album. On August 17, 2017, the album was officially announced and was set to be released a month later.

== Singles ==
The album's first lead single, "That Face", was released on August 17, 2017. The album's second single, "Almost Like Being in Love", was released on August 28, 2017. The album's third and final single, "Have You Met Miss Jones?", was released on September 7, 2017.

== Critical reception ==
Professional ratings
Review scores
Source	Rating
AllMusic	3/5 stars

In Full Swing received mostly positive reviews from music critics. AllMusic's Stephen Thomas Erlewine wrote: "Standing in contrast to the moody 2015 set No One Ever Tells You, 2017's In Full Swing contains some of the sunny brio its title suggests. Chalk it up to the songs Seth MacFarlane selects, of course. There's nary a song of heartbreak among the album's 16 numbers, and he doesn't rely on overly familiar tunes, either. This lighthearted batch of songs is given effervescent arrangements by Joel McNeely, who gladly keeps the proceedings cool and breezy. As always, MacFarlane and McNeely are so besotted with Frank Sinatra's classic long-players for Capitol that their act can seem like a bit of swinging cosplay, with MacFarlane mimicking Old Blue Eyes' finger-snapping charm and McNeely penning love letters to Nelson Riddle, but their execution is expert and, since the touch is light, In Full Swing feels looser and better than its predecessors. MacFarlane and McNeely have taken Frank's advice to take things Nice 'n' Easy to heart, and they're the better for it." Christopher Louden from JazzTimes praised the album, writing, "MacFarlane proves (yet again) fully worthy of such bounty. Alongside top-tier standards from the Gershwins, Irving Berlin, Jerome Kern, Rodgers and Hart, Lerner and Loewe and Jimmy Van Heusen, he unearths several less precious though no less glittering baubles. Among them: the overjoyed "I Like Myself", from It's Always Fair Weather; the jaunty Gordon MacRae-Gisele McKenzie number "My Buick, My Love and I" (featuring Elizabeth Gillies); the pert "A Kiss or Two"; and a sparkling parry with Norah Jones on "If I Had a Talking Picture of You". Through it all, you can't help but be carried away by MacFarlane’s joie de vivre, like a kid in a candy store gleefully sharing his sugar-dusted treats."

== Track listing ==
All music arranged and conducted by Joel McNeely.

No.	Title	Writer(s)	Length
1.	"The First Time It Happens"	Joe Raposo	3:53
2.	"Almost Like Being in Love"	Frederick Loewe; Alan Jay Lerner	2:48
3.	"Isn't This a Lovely Day (To Be Caught in the Rain?)"	Irving Berlin	3:40
4.	"For You, for Me, for Evermore"	George Gershwin; Ira Gershwin	3:08
5.	"Like Someone in Love"	Jimmy Van Heusen; Johnny Burke	3:26
6.	"That Face"	Alan Bergman; Lew Spence	2:35
7.	"If I Had a Talking Picture of You" (featuring Norah Jones)	Lew Brown; Buddy DeSylva; Ray Henderson	3:06
8.	"I'm Glad There Is You"	Jimmy Dorsey; Paul Madeira	3:07
9.	"You Couldn't Be Cuter"	Jerome Kern; Dorothy Fields	2:29
10.	"I Like Myself"	André Previn; Betty Comden; Adolph Green	3:54
11.	"You Can't Love 'Em All"	Van Heusen; Sammy Cahn	2:25
12.	"Have You Met Miss Jones?"	Lorenz Hart; Richard Rodgers	3:06
13.	"A Kiss or Two"	Vincent Youmans; Leo Robin; Clifford Grey	2:22
14.	"But Beautiful"	Van Heusen; Burke	3:51
15.	"Moonlight Becomes You"	Van Heusen; Burke	2:58
16.	"My Buick, My Love and I" (featuring Elizabeth Gillies)	Frank Skinner; Jack Brooks	2:01
Total length:			48:48

== Personnel ==
Credits adapted from AllMusic.

- Jonathan Aasgaard – cello
- Richard Altenbach – violin
- John Anderson – oboe
- Timothy Ball – horn
- Lianne Barnard – flute
- John Barrett – engineering assistance
- Francesca Barritt – violin
- Annie Beilby – viola
- Wayne Bergeron – trumpet
- Chuck Berghofer – bass, rhythm bass
- Alan Bergman – composition
- Irving Berlin – composition
- Rich Breen – engineering, mixing
- Alan Broadbent – keyboards
- Jack Brooks – composition
- Robert Brophy – viola
- Johnny Burke – composition
- Sammy Cahn – composition
- Rowena Calvert – cello
- Gordon Campbell – trombone
- Roberto Cani – violin
- Corinne Chapelle – violin
- Pete Christlieb – saxophone
- Stephano Civetta – engineering assistance
- Heather Clark – flute
- Dave Collins – mastering
- Betty Comden – composition
- Tom Croxon – orchestra contractor
- Wade Culbreath – percussion
- Hannah Dawson – violin
- Autumn de Wilde – cover photo
- Brian Dembow – viola
- Buddy DeSylva – composition
- Shlomy Dobrinsky – violin
- Jimmy Dorsey – composition
- Pierre Doumenge – cello
- Bruce Dukov – violin
- Pip Eastop – horn
- Stephen Erdody – cello
- Peter Erskine – drums
- Alan Estes – percussion
- Dave Everson – horn
- Joy Fehily – executive production
- Dorothy Fields – composition
- Chuck Findley – trumpet
- Marlow Fisher – viola
- Matthew Funes – viola
- Lorenz Gamma – violin
- George Gershwin – composition
- Ira Gershwin – composition
- Elizabeth Gillies – vocals
- Mark Graham – music preparation
- Peter Graham – violin
- Endre Granat – violin
- Adolph Green – composition
- Clifford Grey – composition
- Henry Gronnier – violin
- Lorenz Hart – composition
- Andrew Harvey – violin
- Clayton Haslop – violin
- Tamara Hatwan – violin
- Ray Henderson – composition
- James Van Heusen – composition
- Dan Higgins – alto saxophone, saxophone, woodwind
- Steven Holtman – trombone
- Greg Huckins – saxophone
- Alex Iles – trombone
- Jeremy Isaac – violin
- Kurt Iswarienko – photography
- Charis Jenson – violin
- Karen Jones – flute
- Norah Jones – vocals
- Dennis Karmazyn – viola
- Daniel Kelly – horn
- Jerome Kern – composition
- Liam Kirkman – trombone
- Larry Koonse – guitar
- Aimee Kreston – violin
- Armen Ksajikian – cello
- Stephen Kujala – flute
- Dunja Lavrova – violin
- Alan Jay Lerner – composition
- Phillip Levy – violin
- Gary Lindsay – vocal consultant
- Bill Liston – saxophone
- Frederick Loewe – composition
- Mike Lovatt – trumpet
- Warren Luening – trumpet
- James Lynch – trumpet
- Jens Lynen – violin
- Seth MacFarlane – vocals and producer
- Paul Madeira – composition
- Danny Marsden – trumpet
- Andrew Martin – trombone
- Ciaran McCabe – violin
- Joel McNeely – arranger, conductor, and producer
- John Mills – violin
- Victoria Miskolczy – viola
- Catherine Musker – viola
- Benjamin Newton – viola
- Helen Nightengale – violin
- Peter Noah – bass trombone
- Cheryl Norman – violin
- Michael Nowak – viola
- Brian O'Connor – horn
- Sid Page – violin
- Andy Panayi – alto saxophone
- Joel Pargman – violin
- Alyssa Park – violin
- John Parricelli – guitar
- André Previn – composition
- Tom Ranier – celeste, piano
- Joe Raposo – composition
- Bill Reichenbach – trombone
- Mark Robertson – violin
- Leo Robin – composition
- Richard Rodgers – composition
- Ruth Rogers – violin
- Benedict Rogerson – cello
- Anatoly Rosinsky – violin
- Geraldine Rotella – flute
- Roberto Ruisi – violin
- Brian Scanlon – saxophone
- Colin Skinner – baritone saxophone
- Frank Skinner – composition
- David H. Speltz – viola
- Lew Spence – composition
- Joe Spix – art direction
- Jonathan Stokes – trombone
- Jule Styne – composition
- Bob Summers – trumpet
- Jamie Talbot – tenor saxophone
- James Thatcher – horn
- Phil Todd – tenor saxophone
- Cecilia Tsan – viola
- Viktoriya Tsoy – design
- Jo Ann Turovsky – harp
- Josefina Vergara – violin
- Dave Walther – viola
- Sam Walton – percussion, timpani
- Vicci Wardman – viola
- Hugh Webb – harp
- David Weiss – oboe
- Patrick White – trumpet
- Roger Wilkie – violin
- Steven Wilkie – violin
- Andy Wood – trombone
- Vincent Youmans – composition

== Charts ==
In Full Swing debuted at No. 2 on the US Billboard Top Jazz Albums.

Chart (2017)	Peak position
US Top Jazz Albums (Billboard)	2
US Top Traditional Jazz Albums (Billboard)	1

== Release history ==
Region	Date	Format(s)	Label	Ref.
Worldwide	September 15, 2017	CD; digital download; streaming	Republic; Verve; Fuzzy Door Productions	
Worldwide	September 22, 2017	Vinyl	Republic; Verve; Fuzzy Door Productions	
