= No One Ever Tells You =

Studio album by Seth MacFarlane
- Released: September 30, 2015
- Recorded: June 10–12, 2015
- Studio: Abbey Road Studios
- Genres: Easy listening; traditional pop; vocal jazz; big band
- Length: 60:05
- Labels: Republic; Fuzzy Door
- Producer: Joel McNeely

Seth MacFarlane chronology
Holiday for Swing (2014)	No One Ever Tells You (2015)	In Full Swing (2017)

No One Ever Tells You is the third studio album by American actor and singer Seth MacFarlane. The album was released on September 30, 2015, through Republic Records. The album features Frank Sinatra's bassist Chuck Berghofer as well as a 65-piece orchestra. The album is the follow-up to MacFarlane's 2014 Christmas album Holiday for Swing. Like his two previous albums, No One Ever Tells You was produced and conducted by film and television composer Joel McNeely. The album earned MacFarlane a Grammy Award nomination for Best Traditional Pop Vocal Album.

== Background ==
The album was recorded during the summer of 2015 in Studio 2 at Abbey Road Studios in London during MacFarlane's promotional tour of Ted 2. On what attracted him about making this kind of album, MacFarlane stated, "There was a time during the mid-1950s and early 1960s when popular song was stretching its creative boundaries, and experimenting with more ambitious structures and tones. During this period, a song set out to really tell a story: not just with the lyric and the vocal, but with the arrangements and orchestral interpretations. The songs on this record attempt to do just that." Joel McNeely said about the music of the album, "The instrumentation on this record is unusual. It is a very small string section, only a few brass and woodwinds. But we chose the musicians very carefully. These players have an understanding of the long-lost style of playing from that era and their understanding of the required extra vibrato, copious dramatic slides and bends brings a stylistic realism to the orchestra almost impossible to achieve these days." MacFarlane has initially described the album as being in the style of Frank Sinatra's album In the Wee Small Hours. The album's cover art reflects this.

== Critical reception ==
Professional ratings
Review scores
Source	Rating
AllMusic	3/5 stars

No One Ever Tells You has received mostly positive acclaim from music critics. At Music Times, they commented that "He certainly embodied the style and swagger of Sinatra."

Daily News Kirthana Ramisetti praised the album, commenting "MacFarlane channeled his Sinatra for this album." JazzTimes Christopher Loudon praised the album by saying "Backed by a wall of brass and a sea of strings, MacFarlane again succeeds admirably—as does McNeely, whose charts estimably echo Nelson Riddle and Gordon Jenkins. While he lacks Sinatra’s raw emotional wallop and more closely mirrors the mellow warmth of Dean Martin, he is no poseur. There’s plenty here from the Sinatra canon." A Plus said the following about the album, "While Music was largely upbeat, the melodies in No One are slow and sad in the best possible way. It's the kind of album where the orchestra wraps you up and indulges your sorrow while the nuances in his voice break your heart completely."

== Track listing ==
Standard edition
No.	Title	Writer(s)	Length
1.	"No One Ever Tells You"	Hub Atwood; Carroll Coates	4:03
2.	"I Guess I'll Hang My Tears Out to Dry"	Sammy Cahn; Jule Styne	4:16
3.	"A Ship Without a Sail"	Richard Rodgers; Lorenz Hart	4:18
4.	"The One I Love (Belongs to Somebody Else)"	Isham Jones; Gus Kahn	3:25
5.	"It's All Right with Me"	Cole Porter	5:29
6.	"This Nearly Was Mine"	Rodgers; Oscar Hammerstein II	3:28
7.	"Make This a Slow Goodbye"	Farlan I. Myers; Jack Sher	3:26
8.	"Don't Call It Love"	Henry Mancini; Carole Bayer Sager	3:33
9.	"I'll Only Miss Her When I Think of Her"	Cahn; Jimmy Van Heusen	3:14
10.	"These Foolish Things (Remind Me of You)"	Eric Maschwitz; Jack Strachey	3:25
11.	"Before I Gaze at You Again"	Alan Jay Lerner; Frederick Loewe	4:09
12.	"Only the Lonely"	Cahn; Heusen	4:51
13.	"I Guess I'll Have to Change My Plan"	Howard Dietz; Arthur Schwartz	3:40
14.	"I Wish I Didn't Love You So"	Frank Loesser	3:41
15.	"Goodbye, Little Dream, Goodbye"	Porter	3:51
16.	"Spring Will Be a Little Late This Year"	Loesser	3:03
17.	"Loss of Love"	Mancini; Bob Merrill	3:29
Total length:			1:05:21

== Credits and personnel ==
Credits are adapted from the album's liner notes.

Production

- Joel McNeely – arranger, conductor, liner notes, producer
- Jonathan Allen – engineer
- Rich Breen – Engineer, mixing
- Joy Fehily – executive producer
- Mark Graham – music preparation
- Isobel Griffiths – contracting
- Dave Hage – librarian
- JoAnn Kane – music preparation
- Dave Collins – mastering
- Matthew Peak – illustrations

Musicians

- Seth MacFarlane – vocals
- Jennifer Barnes – vocals (background)
- Dan Bates – cor anglais, oboe
- Chuck Berghofer – bass
- Mark Berrow – violin
- Richard Berry – French horn
- Ishani Bhoola – violin
- Dave Bishop – B-flat clarinet, flute, flute (alto), sax (tenor)
- Richard Bissill – French horn
- Nigel Black – French horn
- Graeme Blevins – B-flat clarinet, flute, flute (alto), sax (alto), sax (soprano)
- John Bradbury – violin
- Gordon Campbell – trombone (tenor)
- Emil Chakalov – violin
- Reiad Chibah – viola
- Chris Cowie – cor anglais, oboe
- Dave Daniels – celli
- Tim Davis – vocal contractor, vocals (background)
- Caroline Dearnley – celli
- Alison Dods – violin
- Phillip Eastop – French horn
- Dai Emanuel – violin
- Matt Skelton – drums
- Andrew Gathercole – flugelhorn, trumpet
- Richard George – violin
- Tim Gill – celli
- Adam Goldsmith – guitar (acoustic)
- Missi Hale – vocals (background)
- David Hartley – celeste, piano
- Andrew Haveron – leader, violin
- John Heley – celli
- Ian Humphries – violin
- Magnus Johnston – leader, violin
- Karen Jones – flute
- Skaila Kanga – harp
- Patrick Kiernan – violin
- Liam Kirkman – trombone (tenor)
- Julia Knight – viola
- Teri Eiko Koide – vocals (background)
- Boguslaw Kostecki – violin
- David Loucks – vocals (background)
- Mike Lovatt – flugelhorn, trumpet
- Jim Lynch – flugelhorn, trumpet
- Rita Manning – violin
- Danny Marsden – flugelhorn, trumpet
- Eliza Marshall – flute
- Howard McGill – B-flat clarinet, flute, flute (alto), sax (tenor)
- Steve Morris – violin
- Nick Moss – B-flat clarinet, flute, flute (alto), sax (tenor)
- Kate Musker – viola
- Everton Nelson – leader, violin
- Mark Nightingale – trombone (tenor)
- Andy Panayi – B-flat clarinet, flute, flute (alto), sax (alto), sax (soprano)
- John Parricelli – guitar (acoustic)
- Alan Pasqua – piano
- Camilla Pay – harp
- David Pyatt – French horn
- Frank Ricotti – percussion
- Tom Rizzo – guitar (acoustic)
- Martin Robertson – B-flat clarinet, clarinet (bass), flute, sax (baritone)
- Jackie Shave – leader, violin
- Emlyn Singleton – violin
- Colin Skinner – B-flat clarinet, clarinet (bass), flute, sax (baritone)
- Sonia Slany – violin
- Jamie Talbot – B-flat clarinet, flute, flute (alto), sax (alto), sax (soprano)
- Cathy Thompson – violin
- Phil Todd – B-flat clarinet, flute, flute (alto), sax (alto), sax (soprano)
- Chris Tombling – violin
- Bozidar Vukotic – celli
- Vicci Wardman – viola
- Richard Watkins – French horn
- Bruce White – viola
- Pat White – flugelhorn, trumpet
- Rolf Wilson – violin
- Andy Wood – trombone (bass)
- Richard Wigley – trombone

== Charts ==
No One Ever Tells You debuted at No. 1 on the US Billboard Top Jazz Albums.

Chart (2015)	Peak position
US Top Jazz Albums (Billboard)	1
US Top Traditional Jazz Albums (Billboard)	1

== Release history ==
Date	Region	Format(s)	Label
September 30, 2015	United States	digital download	Republic Records; Fuzzy Door Productions
October 30, 2015	United States	CD	Republic Records; Fuzzy Door Productions
December 18, 2015	United States	Vinyl	Republic Records; Fuzzy Door Productions
