= Great Songs from Stage & Screen =

Studio album by Seth MacFarlane
- Released: August 28, 2020
- Recorded: 2019–2020
- Studio: Abbey Road Studios
- Genre: Traditional pop; easy listening; swing; big band
- Length: 48:36
- Label: Republic; Verve; Fuzzy Door
- Producer: Joel McNeely; Seth MacFarlane

Seth MacFarlane chronology
Once in a While (2019)	Great Songs from Stage & Screen (2020)	Blue Skies (2022)

Great Songs from Stage & Screen is the sixth studio album by American actor and singer Seth MacFarlane, released on August 28, 2020, by Republic Records and Verve Records. MacFarlane reunited with his longtime producer Joel McNeely. The album features songs from film and theatre, including songs by Rodgers and Hammerstein, Cole Porter, Lerner and Loewe, and Henry Mancini.

== Background ==
On August 9, 2020, MacFarlane teased on his Instagram that a sixth album was coming soon. It was later announced that MacFarlane would release his new album at the end of the month. He recorded a majority of the songs at Abbey Road Studios. However, much of the album's post-production work was done at home due to the ongoing COVID-19 pandemic. MacFarlane described the songs as having been soothing the souls through the decades, saying, "Great songwriting presented with great orchestration is always uplifting. Hopefully these tunes offer, if nothing else, a little mood boost during a dark time." He explained his decision on picking the songs as, "It's just a selection of songs that I wish would be sung more. So you know, instead of 'Oklahoma' by Rodgers and Hammerstein, we do 'All Er Nuthin'.'" He called the album's tone more light than his previous album. He would describe it as more of a repertoire style record. MacFarlane collaborated with composer Bruce Broughton, who he works with on The Orville, to arrange and conduct the album. In explaining his decision on bringing Broughton on board, MacFarlane said, "The album is masterfully arranged by composer Bruce Broughton, whose signature vibrance and sophisticated orchestral texturing is a perfect match for this collection of show-centric swing arrangements and ballads." In addition, MacFarlane brought in members of the John Wilson Orchestra.

== Critical reception ==
Professional ratings
Review scores
Source	Rating
AllMusic	3/5 stars

Great Songs from Stage & Screen received mostly positive reviews from music critics. AllMusic's Stephen Thomas Erlewine wrote "Six albums into his recording career, Seth MacFarlane lands upon an idea to demonstrate his extensive knowledge and love of the Great American Songbook. Instead of concentrating on the standards he and his audience know by heart, he's digging a little deeper into the catalog, using musicals as his divining rod. It's a good idea, and with the help of longtime producer Joel McNeely and arranger Bruce Broughton, MacFarlane sounds at ease in a way he hasn't on record in the past. He's still leaning on his love of Sinatra, but he's reined in some of his affectations, a move that's as welcome as the largely offbeat selections here. When combined, it amounts to a handsome collection that serves as a testament to MacFarlane's good taste in vocal pop." Deanna Costa from The Arts Fuse lauded MacFarlane's cover of "Once Upon a Dream", saying it's "filled with happy nostalgia" and did "wonderful justice to this Disney classic."

== Track listing ==
All music arranged and conducted by Bruce Broughton.

No.	Title	Writer(s)	Length
1.	"Once Upon a Dream"	Pyotr Ilyich Tchaikovsky; Jack Lawrence; Sammy Fain	2:42
2.	"I Loved You Once in Silence"	Frederick Loewe; Alan Jay Lerner	4:48
3.	"Let's Not Be Sensible"	Sammy Cahn; Jimmy Van Heusen	2:52
4.	"Ten Minutes Ago"	Rodgers and Hammerstein	2:55
5.	"Ain't Got a Dime to My Name (Ho Ho Ho Ho Hum)"	Van Heusen; Johnny Burke	3:11
6.	"Love Is Only Love"	Jerry Herman	4:53
7.	"What Did I Have That I Don't Have?"	Burton Lane; Lerner	3:45
8.	"Come Out, Come Out, Wherever You Are"	Cahn; Jule Styne	3:37
9.	"Two for the Road"	Henry Mancini; Leslie Bricusse	5:22
10.	"All Er Nothin'"	Rodgers and Hammerstein	3:11
11.	"You'd Be So Nice to Come Home To"	Cole Porter	4:15
12.	"Mind If I Make Love to You?"	Porter	3:41
13.	"Time for Parting"	André Previn; Betty Comden; Adolph Green	3:17
Total length:			48:36

== Personnel ==
Credits adapted from AllMusic.

- Jonathan Aasgaard – Cello
- John Anderson – Oboe
- John Barrett – Assistant Engineer
- Chuck Berghofer – Bass
- Irving Berlin – Composer
- Anna-Liisa Bezrodny – Violin
- Adrian Bradbury – Cello
- Rich Breen – Engineer, Mixing
- Bruce Broughton – Arranger and Conductor
- Benjamin Buckton – Violin
- Sammy Cahn – Composer
- Gordon Campbell – Trombone
- Rebecca Chambers – Viola
- Corinne Chappelle – Violin
- Stephano Civetta – Assistant Engineer
- Dave Collins – Mastering
- Betty Comden – Composer
- Kris Crawford – Assistant Engineer
- Tom Croxon – Orchestra Contractor
- Hannah Dawson – Violin
- Rudi DeGroote – Cello
- Shlomy Dobrinsky – Violin
- Kira Doherty – French Horn
- Pierre Doumenge – Cello
- Dream Town Orchestra – Orchestration
- Clare Duckworth – Violin
- Michael Edwards – Composer
- Peter Erskine – Drums
- Joy Fehily – Executive Producer
- Carl Fischer – Composer
- Sammy Gallop – Composer
- Ian Gibbs – Violin
- Tim Gibbs – Bass
- Thomas Goodman – Bass
- Mark Graham – Music Preparation
- Peter Graham – Violin
- Adolph Green – Composer
- Bud Green – Composer
- Thelma Handy – Violin
- Philip Harmer – Oboe
- Lorenz Hart – Composer
- Andrew Harvey – Violin
- Richard Harwood – Cello
- Oliver Heath – Violin
- Cormac Henry – Flute
- Dan Higgins – Clarinet, Sax (Alto)
- Jeremy Isaac – Violin
- Maya Iwabuchi – Violin
- Paul James – Composer
- Magnus Johnston – Violin
- Cerys Jones – Violin
- Francis Kefford – Viola
- Liam Kirkman – Trombone
- Larry Koonse – Guitars
- Nicholas Korth – French Horn
- Frankie Laine – Composer
- Dunja Lavrova – Violin
- Peggy Lee – Composer
- Mike Lovatt – Trumpet
- James Lynch – Trumpet
- Seth MacFarlane – Vocals and Producer
- Ciaran McCabe – Violin
- Joel McNeely – Producer
- Johnny Mercer – Composer
- John Mills – Violin
- Kate Musker – Viola
- Alex Neal – Percussion
- Benjamin Newton – Viola
- Peter North – Trombone
- Simon Oliver – Bass
- John Parricelli – Guitars
- Fiona Paterson – Flute
- Julie Pryce – Bassoon
- Matthew Quenby – Viola
- Tom Ranier – Piano
- Edward C. Redding – Composer
- Richard Rodgers – Composer
- Ruth Rogers – Violin
- Ben Rogerson – Cello
- Laura Samuel – Violin
- Victor Schertzinger – Composer
- Bill Sienkiewicz – Illustrations
- Kristen Sorace – Design
- Lew Spence – Composer
- Joe Spix – Art Direction
- Jill Streater – Librarian
- Jule Styne – Composer
- Kay Swift – Composer
- Laurence Ungless – Bass
- Sam Walton – Percussion
- Vicci Wardman – Viola
- Hugh Webb – Harp
- Natalie Weber – A&R
- Claire Webster – Bassoon
- Hubie Wheeler – Composer
- Michael Whight – Clarinet
- Pat White – Trumpet
- Alec Wilder – Composer
- Steven Wilkie – Violin

== Release history ==
Region	Date	Format(s)	Label	Ref.
Worldwide	August 28, 2020	Digital download; streaming	Republic; Verve; Fuzzy Door Productions	
Worldwide	October 9, 2020	CD; vinyl	Republic; Verve; Fuzzy Door Productions	
