= No Moon at All =

American jazz song by David Mann and Reed Evans

"No Moon at All" is a jazz standard written in 1947 by David Mann and Redd Evans. The vocal parts were initially performed by Doris Day.
