= Once in a While (Seth MacFarlane album) =

Studio album by Seth MacFarlane
- Released: April 19, 2019
- Recorded: 2018–March 8, 2019
- Studio: Abbey Road Studios
- Genres: Traditional pop; easy listening; big band
- Length: 58:55
- Labels: Republic; Verve; Fuzzy Door
- Producers: Joel McNeely; Seth MacFarlane; Joy Fehily (also exec.)

Seth MacFarlane chronology
In Full Swing (2017)	Once in a While (2019)	Great Songs from Stage & Screen (2020)

Singles from Once in a While
- 1. "Half As Lovely (Twice As True)" Released: April 11, 2019

Once in a While is the fifth studio album by American actor and singer Seth MacFarlane, released on April 19, 2019, by Republic Records and Verve Records. The record was primarily produced by Joel McNeely and MacFarlane himself, who also serves as the executive producer. The lead single from the album, "Half As Lovely (Twice As True)", was released digitally on April 11, 2019.

== Background ==
On March 8, 2019, MacFarlane revealed on his Twitter account that he had just finished recording his new album at Abbey Road Studios. It was also announced that for the first time, MacFarlane would be working with Andrew Cottee as the composer and arranger instead of Joel McNeely, however he still remained a producer for the album. MacFarlane has a close relationship with the composer, since meeting on the 2016 animated musical film Sing and later working together on The Orville. MacFarlane described the album as a moody style of Sinatra's signature albums. "I love the ballad album, the rich, melancholy songs," MacFarlane said. "You're taking a theme or a mood or a tone or an emotion and assembling a set list where everything lives in that space, so when you put it on, you're spending the 60 minutes or however long the album is immersed in that one emotion." Cottee also described the album as "not necessarily sad break-up songs. They're more reflective, thoughtful, even philosophical, but they're not all torch songs."

== Critical reception ==
The Straits Times gave the album a positive review while also saying that MacFarlane should shake things up to make his music more fresh. Jazz Weekly's George W. Harris praised the album and MacFarlane himself, saying, "but it wouldn't work unless MacFarlane didn't have a strong enough voice to convince, and he does. He sounds convincing, assured and personal."

== Track listing ==
All music is composed by Andrew Cottee

No.	Title	Writer(s)	Length
1.	"Half As Lovely (Twice As True)"	Sammy Gallop; Lew Spence	4:52
2.	"I Remember You"	Victor Schertzinger; Johnny Mercer	5:30
3.	"They Say It's Wonderful"	Irving Berlin	4:57
4.	"We'll Be Together Again"	Carl T. Fischer; Frankie Laine	3:51
5.	"The Things We Did Last Summer"	Sammy Cahn; Jule Styne	3:35
6.	"I'll Be Around"	Alec Wilder	4:01
7.	"There'll Be Another Spring"	Peggy Lee; Hubie Wheeler	3:47
8.	"Once in a While"	Michael Edwards; Bud Green	4:17
9.	"The Party's Over"	Jule Styne; Betty Comden; Adolph Green	4:55
10.	"Can't We Be Friends?"	Paul James; Kay Swift	4:52
11.	"What'll I Do"	Irving Berlin	4:52
12.	"You Are Too Beautiful"	Richard Rodgers; Lorenz Hart	5:02
13.	"The End of a Love Affair"	Edward Redding	4:23
Total length:			58:55

== Personnel ==
Credits adapted from AllMusic.

- Jonathan Aasgaard – Cello
- John Anderson – Oboe
- John Barrett – Assistant Engineer
- Chuck Berghofer – Bass
- Irving Berlin – Composer
- Anna-Liisa Bezrodny – Violin
- Adrian Bradbury – Cello
- Rich Breen – Engineer, Mixing
- Benjamin Buckton – Violin
- Sammy Cahn – Composer
- Gordon Campbell – Trombone
- Rebecca Chambers – Viola
- Corinne Chappelle – Violin
- Stephano Civetta – Assistant Engineer
- Dave Collins – Mastering
- Betty Comden – Composer
- Andrew Cottee – Arranger, Conductor
- Kris Crawford – Assistant Engineer
- Tom Croxon – Orchestra Contractor
- Hannah Dawson – Violin
- Rudi DeGroote – Cello
- Shlomy Dobrinsky – Violin
- Kira Doherty – French Horn
- Pierre Doumenge – Cello
- Dream Town Orchestra – Orchestration
- Clare Duckworth – Violin
- Michael Edwards – Composer
- Peter Erskine – Drums
- Joy Fehily – Executive Producer
- Carl Fischer – Composer
- Sammy Gallop – Composer
- Ian Gibbs – Violin
- Tim Gibbs – Bass
- Thomas Goodman – Bass
- Mark Graham – Music Preparation
- Peter Graham – Violin
- Adolph Green – Composer
- Bud Green – Composer
- Thelma Handy – Violin
- Philip Harmer – Oboe
- Lorenz Hart – Composer
- Andrew Harvey – Violin
- Richard Harwood – Cello
- Oliver Heath – Violin
- Cormac Henry – Flute
- Dan Higgins – Clarinet, Sax (Alto)
- Jeremy Isaac – Violin
- Maya Iwabuchi – Violin
- Paul James – Composer
- Magnus Johnston – Violin
- Cerys Jones – Violin
- Francis Kefford – Viola
- Liam Kirkman – Trombone
- Larry Koonse – Guitars
- Nicholas Korth – French Horn
- Frankie Laine – Composer
- Dunja Lavrova – Violin
- Peggy Lee – Composer
- Mike Lovatt – Trumpet
- James Lynch – Trumpet
- Seth MacFarlane – Art Direction, Liner Notes, Primary Artist, Producer, Vocals
- Ciaran McCabe – Violin
- Joel McNeely – Producer
- Johnny Mercer – Composer
- John Mills – Violin
- Kate Musker – Viola
- Alex Neal – Percussion
- Benjamin Newton – Viola
- Peter North – Trombone
- Simon Oliver – Bass
- John Parricelli – Guitars
- Fiona Paterson – Flute
- Julie Pryce – Bassoon
- Matthew Quenby – Viola
- Tom Ranier – Piano
- Edward C. Redding – Composer
- Richard Rodgers – Composer
- Ruth Rogers – Violin
- Ben Rogerson – Cello
- Laura Samuel – Violin
- Victor Schertzinger – Composer
- Bill Sienkiewicz – Illustrations
- Kristen Sorace – Design
- Lew Spence – Composer
- Joe Spix – Art Direction
- Jill Streater – Librarian
- Jule Styne – Composer
- Kay Swift – Composer
- Laurence Ungless – Bass
- Sam Walton – Percussion
- Vicci Wardman – Viola
- Hugh Webb – Harp
- Natalie Weber – A&R
- Claire Webster – Bassoon
- Hubie Wheeler – Composer
- Michael Whight – Clarinet
- Pat White – Trumpet
- Alec Wilder – Composer
- Steven Wilkie – Violin

== Charts ==
Once in a While debuted at No. 5 on the US Billboard Top Jazz Albums.

Chart (2019)	Peak position
US Top Jazz Albums (Billboard)	5

== Release history ==
Region	Date	Format(s)	Label	Ref.
Worldwide	April 19, 2019	Digital download; streaming	Republic; Verve; Fuzzy Door Productions	
Worldwide	April 26, 2019	CD; vinyl	Republic; Verve; Fuzzy Door Productions	
