= The Sword in the Stoned =

- Ted episode
- Bill Clinton (Seth MacFarlane), as he yells at Matty (offscreen). MacFarlane used AI to make himself look like Clinton, which proved polarizing for fans and critics.
- Episode no.: Season 2 Episode 5
- Directed by: Seth MacFarlane
- Written by: Julius Sharpe
- Original air date: March 5, 2026
- Running time: 32 minutes

Guest appearance
- Francesca Xuereb as Erin Lyons

Episode chronology
← Previous "The Mom's Bombed Rom-Com"	Next → "Roe v. Weed"

"The Sword in the Stoned" is the fifth episode of the second season of the American fantasy comedy television series Ted. Written by Julius Sharpe, and directed by Seth MacFarlane, it premiered on the American streaming service Peacock, along with the rest of season two, on March 5, 2026. The series acts as a precursor to the Ted film franchise, showcasing the childhood lives of the protagonists.

The series, set in 1994, focuses on John Bennett (Max Burkholder), the series' primary protagonist, an awkward high-school aged boy; along with Ted (MacFarlane), the series' titular anthropomorphic teddy bear. The two live with John's family, Susan (Alanna Ubach), his mild mannered mother, and Matty (Scott Grimes), his conservative father. Also residing with the family is Blaire (Giorgia Whigham), his radically liberal cousin whom often clashes with Matty. In the episode, Ted and John join the school play so they can have more extracurricular activities for their college applications, but the latter grows a connection with the school's popular teenager, Erin (Francesca Xuereb). Concurrently, Susan and Matty get a job at Dunkin' Donuts to help with their financial troubles, and Matty is given an opportunity to tell off Bill Clinton.

Burkholder wore prop armor during the episode's play scenes. Bill Clinton’s appearance in the episode was portrayed by MacFarlane. After conventional makeup and visual techniques failed to convincingly resemble Clinton, the production used artificial intelligence to digitally replace MacFarlane's face with Clinton's likeness. Upon release, the episode received generally positive reviews from critics, though the use of AI in the Clinton scene was polarizing among audiences and reviewers.

== Plot ==
John tells Ted that he is the last single guy left at their school, to which Ted points out the popular, single cheerleader, Erin, (Note: Erin previously appeared in the first season of Ted, notably "Desperately Seeking Susan".) but John dismisses this. At home, Blaire tells John that he needs extracurricular activities to get into college, while Susan and Matty discuss their financial troubles, especially regarding John's college tuition. Looking over their options, they decide to audition for a school production of the play Camelot. Matty takes a job at Dunkin' Donuts, despite being told that nobody will give him a tip, and having to wear an incorrect name tag. Waiting for their auditions, John and Ted watch several poor auditions for the play before seeing Erin's, who delivers a flawless performance; John and Ted do less serious auditions, getting cast as knights, while Erin gets the role of Guinevere.

Matty complains about his low salary, and Susan decides to get a job at Dunkin' Donuts beside him to help earn more income. Erin clashes with Lancelot's actor while rehearsing, and John compliments her performance, which she ignores, but, seeing Ted and John give good performances in a repetition exercise, she becomes interested in him, particularly since he treats her better than her stage-partner. Matty and Susan watch an employee training video, explaining how they should treat customers politely, not affecting Matty's nihilistic attitude. The manager announces that Bill Clinton is visiting their Dunkin' Donuts for publicity, and Matty sees this as a chance to tell Bill off. John and Erin practice lines, as she reveals the show is being taped so it can be sent to Emerson College in hopes of her getting in; Erin asks John to go out with her after the show.

At dinner, Matty enthusiastically reveals what he plans to tell Bill, as John becomes stressed about the play when Susan tells there will be a large audience. Bill comes to the Dunkin' Donuts, and, seeing Matty is nervously insulting him, stages a private meeting with him, where Bill yells at Matty, calling him a loser before posing for a picture with Matty and subsequently throwing the cold coffee onto him. To ease the pressure, Ted and John take edibles from Blaire, but learn at the show that they contained mushrooms, causing them to stress further. On stage, Ted and John yell nervously that they're on drugs as the latter urinates in his costume, causing Erin to angrily storm off.

== Production ==
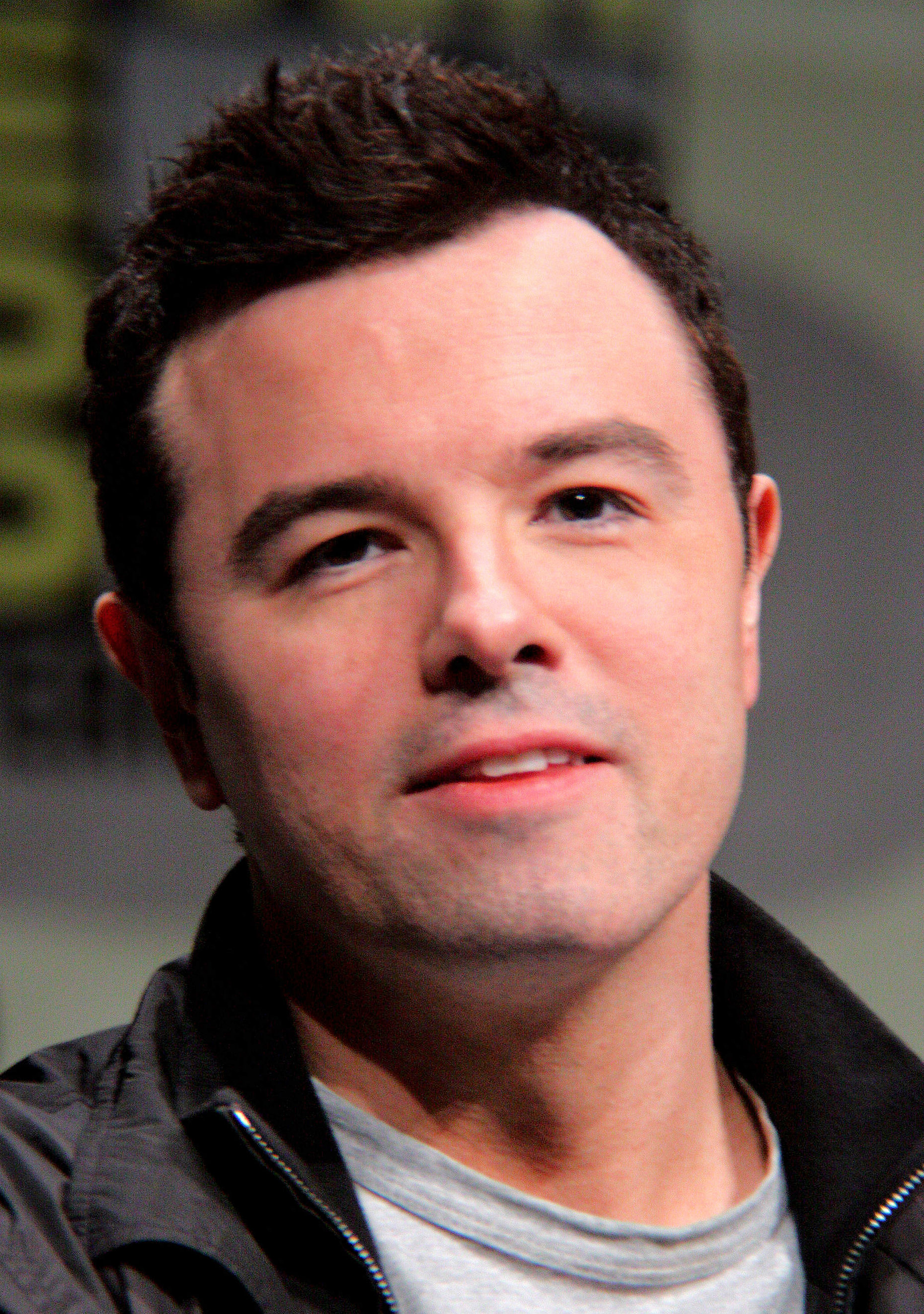
"The Sword in the Stoned" was directed by Seth MacFarlane, who also portrayed Bill Clinton.

"The Sword in the Stoned" was directed by series creator and lead Seth MacFarlane, and written by Julius Sharpe in his third and final writing credit for the series. When Ted and John are doing repetition exercises, they tackle each other to the ground, which required a stuntman named Ashton to play the role of Ted, according to Max Burkholder, who portrays John. Burkholder also recalled that, when Ted was choking John in the scene, he kept making a noise during the choking, which made Bill, the cameraman, laugh, despite being a "stone face" that never laughs, noting that seeing him be amused by the noise he was making assured Burkholder that what he was doing was "hilarious".

Burkholder found the filming of the play scenes "weird", as he was put in fake armor with a hose inside his suit—which was filled with water mixed with yellow food coloring—that was made to create the urine stream that comes out of John's armor in the episode; he also noted that it took around 45 minutes to put on and take off the armor. He revealed that he himself had to urinate during the filming, as doing a scene about a character having to do so "really [broke] my brain", with the fact that it took 45 minutes to get the suit off adding to the frustration. Jennifer Ashley Connell, who worked for wardrobe, had to repeatedly go to Burkholder quickly between takes to dry off his pants with two hair dryers to make it look like the fake urine hadn't already streamed down his pants, so they could get as many shots of it as possible. Francesca Xuereb guest stars in the episode as Erin, the cheerleader who stars in the play.

Incumbent president Bill Clinton was portrayed by MacFarlane, with artificial intelligence (AI) being used to digitally make MacFarlane's face look like Clinton's during post-production. Before settling on AI, the crew tried to use traditional computer-generated imagery and prosthetics, which made him look "terrifying", resulting in them deciding that AI would give them a more accurate look. One of the original technologies considered was one where, after scanning MacFarlane, a mesh of his head was created, and they had to use computer graphics to replace MacFarlane's face with Clinton's. An issue was faced, however, when they found the archival footage used as reference from the Clinton Library—an official Presidential Library containing information related to Clinton—to be extremely low-quality, making it hard to properly emulate his face, since only still images were of acceptable quality, and there weren't references of his moving face to work off of. A forensic artist was hired to help with this, and they created a 3D model of Clinton's head in ZBrush, based on his presidential portrait. The model head worked for still frames, but movement was still difficult to do realistically, due to it being made for a "single-point perspective", which made details like the cheekbones or other minor issues more noticeable when using it for the scene. Since this did not work, AI was ultimately chosen through the studio Deep Voodoo, which used large language models to teach the deepfake AI how to correctly replicate Clinton's appearance. Running at around two and a half minutes, the sequence with Clinton took around 38 shots before it was done. Defending the episode's use of AI, MacFarlane noted that the crew did not want people to focus on deepfake AI being used, trying to utilize it in a way that wouldn't distract from the humor and narrative. Like the rest of the series, the episode was shot using ViewScreen; MacFarlane was able to act live with the cast as Ted due to ViewScreen, a technology that allows the production crew to visualize what Ted will look like in each scene in real time.

== Release and reception ==
"The Sword in the Stoned" was first released on March 5, 2026, on the American streaming service Peacock, along with the rest of the second season. Nate Richards of Collider highlighted the Dunkin' Donuts subplot as an example of Scott Grimes delivering a "lot of laughs" through his performance as Matty.

Dustin Rowles of Pajiba called "The Sword in the Stoned" one of the season's many episodes he'd recommend, particularly for the scenes of Ted and John being high on mushrooms during the play. Oppositely, Nick Valdez of ComicBook.com ranked the episode as the worst of the second season, criticizing it for not having a "huge impact" on the Bennett family dynamic like other episodes of the season do, and Susan and Matty's side story as the main reason he felt it was "[kept] from being great". Valdez noted the episode for likely being an advertisement for Dunkin' Donuts, calling the plot's ending scene involving Clinton the reason "it just all sticks out like a sore thumb".

=== Response to AI usage ===
Bill Clinton, as he appeared in his presidential portrait

The episode's use of AI for MacFarlane's portrayal of Clinton proved controversial, mainly on social media, where audiences asserted that the crew should have gotten an actor that resembles him, particularly regarding MacFarlane's comments that AI was "the only way". However, some fans agreed with MacFarlane that it made him look realistically like Clinton. Responding to the feedback, Burkholder defended the episode's use of deepfake AI, feeling that MacFarlane's performance in the scene was "incredible". Having not seen the scene until the season premiere, he asserted that he "[trusts] them" to use AI properly, as they had proven themselves competent enough with the visual effects of Ted, calling it a "cool, good use of AI" while acknowledging that it is not an "inevitable force".

MovieWeb writer Marcos Melendez noted that the episode could create a "happy middle ground" for AI usage in media, where it can enhance the creation, rather than replace the work of humans. Isabella Albaig of Decider called the scene a catalyst for possible "ethical concerns", particularly as it depicts Clinton as a malicious figure in a way that might make audiences think it was actually him; despite this, Albaig highlighted Clinton calling Matty a "dog's vagina", writing "we may have never gotten to experience [that phrase] coming out of Bill Clinton's smug face—and that may just be a good enough excuse as any". Vulture's Bethy Squires felt this was an unneeded usage of deepfake AI, as the scene is mainly meant to showcase Matty's shock at Clinton's vulgar remarks, not requiring Clinton to be shown, also noting that the series has consistently given a "non-theme-park version" of the 1990s, and so a realistic Clinton portrayed by an actor would've fit the aesthetic they were going for.
