= He's Gotta Have It =

- Ted episode
- John (left) talks to Bethany after he confesses to the whole school via microphone that he is a virgin.
- Episode no.: Season 1 Episode 7
- Directed by: Seth MacFarlane
- Written by: Paul Corrigan; Brad Walsh
- Original air date: January 11, 2024
- Running time: 42 minutes

Episode chronology
← Previous "Loud Night"	Next → "Talk Dirty to Me"

"He's Gotta Have It" is the first season finale of the American fantasy comedy series Ted. Written by Paul Corrigan and Brad Walsh and directed by series creator Seth MacFarlane, it premiered on the American streaming service Peacock, along with the rest of season one, on January 11, 2024. The series acts as a precursor to the Ted film franchise, showcasing the childhood lives of the protagonists.

The series, set in 1993, focuses on John Bennett (Max Burkholder), the series' primary protagonist, an awkward high-school aged boy; along with Ted (MacFarlane), the series' titular anthropomorphic teddy bear. The two live with John's family, Susan (Alanna Ubach), his mild-mannered mother, and Matty (Scott Grimes), his conservative father. Also residing with the family is Blaire (Giorgia Whigham), his radically liberal cousin whom often clashes with Matty. In the episode, Ted attempts to help John both lose his virginity and get a date for the prom. After succeeding in the latter, John ends up alienating his date by lying about his sexual experience.

Much like the rest of the first season, the episode continues to parody popular culture in the 1990s, notably the 1992 film Aladdin. The episode's conclusion helps give a proper origin to the "Thunder Buddies" song seen in the first Ted film. Upon release, the episode received positive reviews from critics, with certain scenes being highlighted as some of the season's greatest moments.

== Plot ==
After sexual education class, Ted and John learn that the latter is the only virgin left in school. Ted agrees to help John have sex, and asks Blaire for advice, to no avail. Blaire tells Susan and Matty that they should teach John about safe sex, and they go to his room and attempt to explain sex to him in a wholesome manner; Susan tells John about her first time with Matty, where, in 1974, they were about to have sex, but, on the television in their room, it was reported that Richard Nixon had resigned, and Matty was too agitated to perform. John and Ted go to buy weed, where they run into their dealer's sister, Bethany, who has an instant connection with John. She invites him to the cinema, and John realizes this is an opportunity to have sex.

John buys a condom at a pharmacy, and Ted tests him on his knowledge on bras, but makes it too difficult for John to properly learn. Blaire witnesses this, and, wanting to teach John, tells him that he should not only be interested in sex, but John decides to follow Ted's advice. John, paired with the knowledge that girls his age like the film Aladdin, transports Bethany to the cinema in a magic carpet akin to the film. However, Bethany confesses that she has not seen Aladdin, and the two realize they have similar taste in movies. The ride crashes, and the two go to the hospital, where they decide to go to the prom together; with Ted's insistence, John lies that he has had sex multiple times before. This alienates Bethany, who cancels their prom date the next day. John feels defeated, but, after assurance from his family, goes to the prom anyways, along with Ted and Blaire.

John talks with Bethany, who does not want to associate with him; to prove he is actually a virgin, John goes up and announces it on a microphone, and he is subsequently mocked by everyone. After, Bethany commends his bravery, and confesses that she is a virgin, too. The two go to Bethany's empty house, where they make out. Before they have sex, a news bulletin plays regarding the murder trial of O. J. Simpson, distracting Bethany and ruining John's chances. At home, Ted comforts John, and, after being afraid of the thunder, the two go to a write a song about their fear.

== Production ==
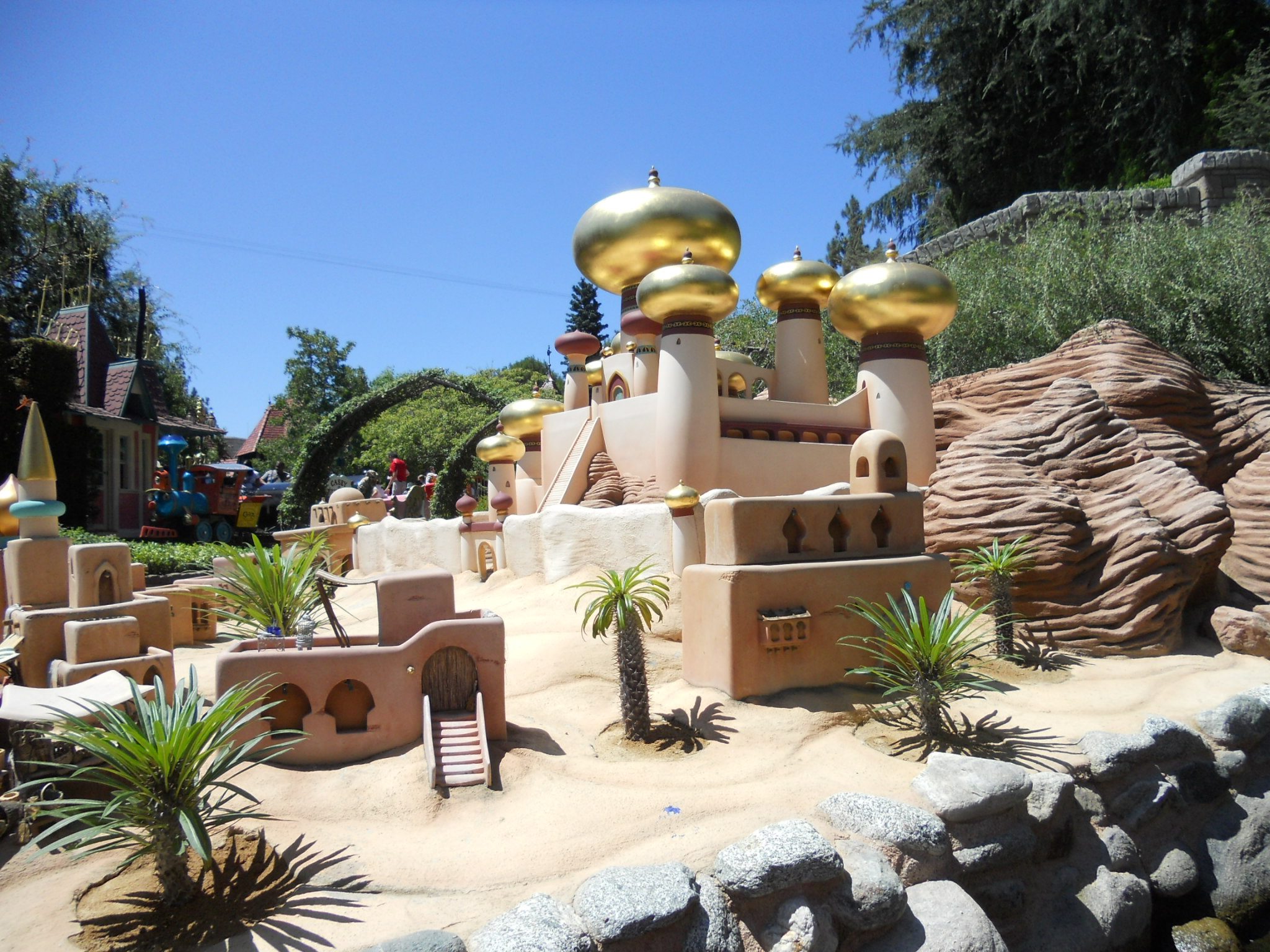
The 1992 film Aladdin is referenced in the episode, continuing the series' lampooning of 1990s popular culture.

"He's Gotta Have It" was directed by series creator and lead Seth MacFarlane, and was written by Paul Corrigan and Brad Walsh. Filming concluded on November 24, 2022, as revealed by MacFarlane on Twitter. The trial of O. J. Simpson and the Walt Disney Animation Studios film Aladdin (1992) are both referenced in the episode, continuing the series' pattern of referencing aspects of popular culture from the 1990s. The DJ that gives John access to the microphone at the prom was portrayed by musician AJ Rafael. Bethany Borgwort, John's love interest, is played by Charlotte Fountain-Jardim.

At the end of the episode, Ted and John create a basis for a song revolving around their hatred of thunder; this song would become "Thunder Buddies", a song that John and Ted sing together in the first Ted film (2012), giving an origin story to the song. During the filming of this scene, Burkholder improvised a line about John getting physically fit, "Oh man, I want to get so ridiculously buff. Like the kind of buff you can only be if it's literally your job and other people are paying for the nutrition and the steroids"; this line was ultimately cut, but was retooled for the second season finale, "Fraudcast News". Like the rest of the series, the episode was shot using ViewScreen; MacFarlane was able to act live with the cast as Ted due to ViewScreen, a technology that allows the production crew to visualize what Ted will look like in each scene in real time.

== Release and reception ==
"He's Gotta Have It" was first released on January 11, 2024, on the American streaming service Peacock, along with the rest of the first season. Ryan O'Rourke of Collider praised the scene of John admitting that he is a virgin, highlighting Ted's mocking of him during and subsequent response that he's "[not] going down with him" as examples of MacFarlane's "signature humor shin[ing] through".

Anna Govert of Paste noted John's maturity level for reaching its natural peak in "He's Gotta Have It", calling Blaire the catalyst for him growing as a person throughout the season through her heartfelt talks and words of advice to him. Govert hailed this side of Blaire as one of her best character strengths, particularly for how, despite the efforts of Ted, she has a positive influence on both John and everyone else's lives. TVOverMind writer Jeffrey Bowie Jr. listed Ted helping John try to learn how to unhook a bra as one of his favorite scenes from the season, calling it "possibly the funniest moment in the series". Highlighting both the visual gag of Ted wearing a bra and him comically making it difficult for John to take off, Bowie Jr. commended MacFarlane for writing a scene on the topic of sex in a "grounded and hilarious manner".

In his ranking of the series' best quotes, Screen Rant's Ben Sherlock hailed John's line, "I think I'm gonna do it Ted's way.", followed by Blaire's, "That is a very self-destructive sentence" as the 7th best; it was the only dialogue exchange between John and Blaire to be featured on the ranking. Separately, Sherlock also praised the episode's concluding joke, where, after Ted and John's "heart to heart", a "tongue-in-cheek" message appears onto the screen, discussing how O.J Simpson was ultimately acquitted, before reading, "The real killer is still at large". Sherlock praised the series' bravery for this joke, particularly for being a "hilariously morbid" end to a family sitcom.
