= Loud Night =

- Ted episode
- Blaire makes out with Sarah on her bed, just before Susan walks in.
- Episode no.: Season 1 Episode 6
- Directed by: Seth MacFarlane
- Written by: Julius Sharpe
- Original air date: January 11, 2024
- Running time: 43 minutes

Episode chronology
← Previous "Desperately Seeking Susan"	Next → "He's Gotta Have It"

"Loud Night" is the sixth episode of the American fantasy comedy series Ted. Written by Julius Sharpe and directed by series creator Seth MacFarlane, it premiered on the American streaming service Peacock, along with the rest of season one, on January 11, 2024. The series acts as a precursor to the Ted film franchise, showcasing the childhood lives of the protagonists.

The series, set in 1993, focuses on John Bennett (Max Burkholder), the series' primary protagonist, an awkward high-school aged boy; along with Ted (MacFarlane), the series' titular anthropomorphic teddy bear. The two live with John's family, Susan (Alanna Ubach), his mild mannered mother, and Matty (Scott Grimes), his conservative father. Also residing with the family is Blaire (Giorgia Whigham), his radically liberal cousin whom often clashes with Matty. In "Loud Night", the family discovers that Blaire is sexually fluid, and has been dating her friend, Sarah (Marissa Shankar). Meanwhile, Matty wishes for a friend, and is given a talking toy truck, who shares Matty's conservative attitudes.

Ubach listed the scene of her walking in on Blaire and Sarah as her "favorite", recalling that it required multiple takes to complete. Upon release, the episode received positive reception from critics; with one calling it the stand-out episode of the season.

== Plot ==
John Bennett, a teenage boy living in 1990s Boston, frosts Christmas cookies with his roommate and best friend Ted, an anthropomorphic teddy bear. His radically liberal cousin Blaire tell them that her friend Sarah will be staying over for Christmas. John's mother Susan warmly welcomes her, while Matty, John's conservative father, comes in and makes a misogynistic comment after John refuses to help shovel snow. Offended, Blaire insults Matty for his bigotry, causing him to storm off angrily. The family prepares for church, where Susan will sing with the choir, but Matty chooses to stay home to rest. Alone, Matty finds solace in his childhood toy, a red fire truck nicknamed Dennis. He then confides his political views to it. After Susan ignores Matty for missing her solo, he wishes on a shooting star for Dennis to come to life and befriend him, since this worked for John and Ted. Shocked when his wish works, Matty shows Dennis to his family, who are largely unfazed. After Dennis begins to make racist comments regarding immigration, Sarah, an immigrant herself, is offended.

Susan brings cookies to Blaire and Sarah, only to find the two kissing on Blaire's bed. She dismisses it as a display of friendship, refusing to believe they are together. At dinner, Blaire can no longer tolerate Matty and Dennis's casual bigotry and announces she is both dating Sarah and is sexually fluid. Matty, encouraged by Dennis, expresses his distaste for the relationship, prompting Blaire and Sarah to storm off. Susan shames Matty, while John and Ted show their support for Blaire, who thanks them despite their little understanding of the situation. Blaire attempts to help Matty understand her sexuality; he almost apologizes, but Dennis interjects with more homophobic comments, enraging Blaire. Matty fully apologizes to Blaire and Sarah, who accept. Matty confronts Dennis, who is forced to reveal that he is secretly gay and acts bigoted to hide it. He kicks Dennis out of the house, who shamefully leaves and says sorry. The family happily opens presents on Christmas morning, as Dennis heads off in the snow to Massachusetts.

Meanwhile, after arguing with a church patron about what constitutes a miracle from God, Ted assumes he is the reincarnation of Jesus. Ted offers his "wisdom" to the Bennett family, primarily while Matty and Blaire argue. Once Sarah informs him that Jesus was crucified, Ted abandons his charade and returns to his normal self.

== Production ==
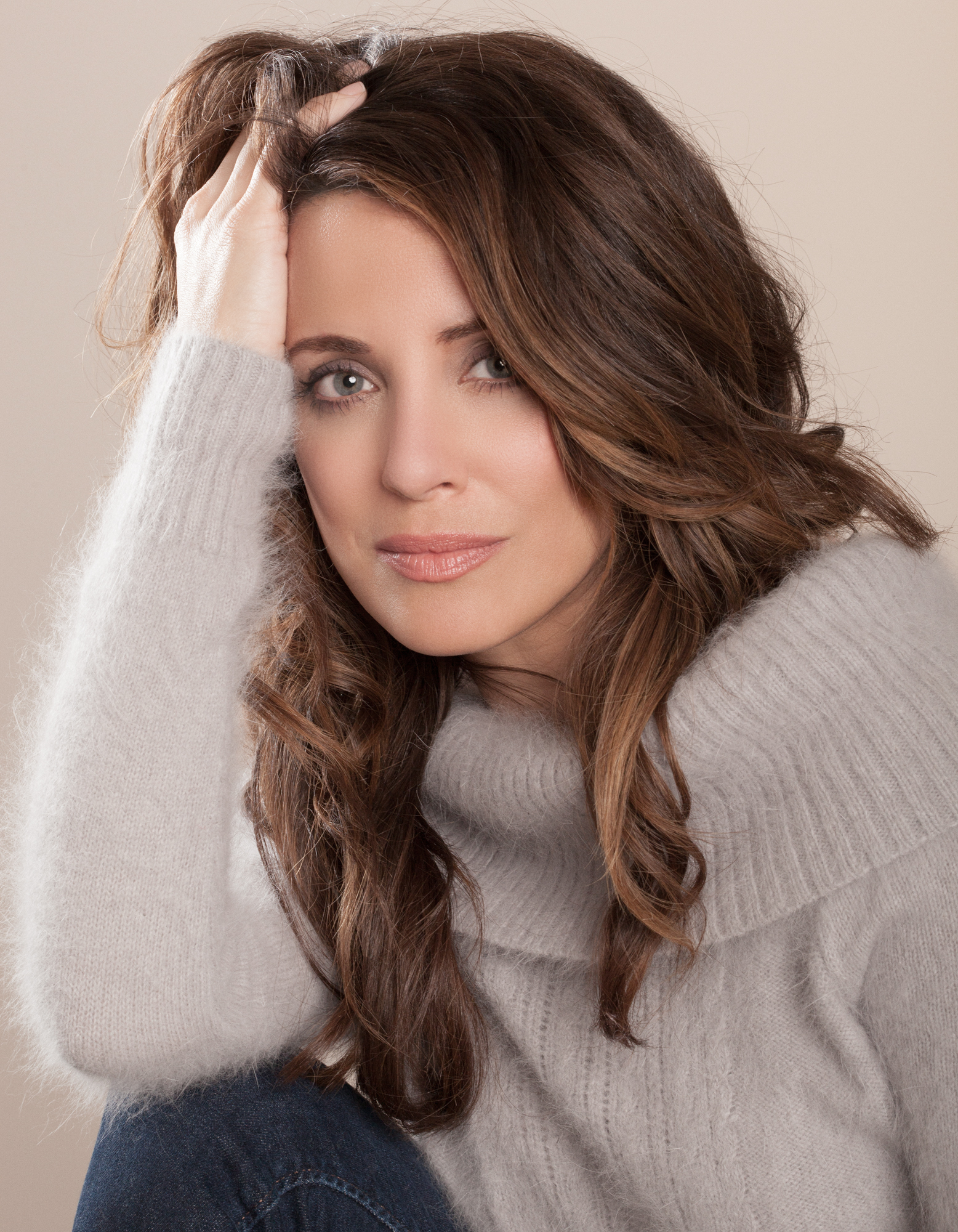
Alanna Ubach (pictured) portrays Susan.

A Christmas special, "Loud Night" was directed by series creator Seth MacFarlane and written by Julius Sharpe. Dennis is credited as being portrayed by Bobby Strom in the episode, but it has been assumed that MacFarlane is actually the voice actor, with one critic suggesting Bobby Strom could be a pseudonym. Marissa Shankar, who had only appeared in several indie films before Ted, makes her third and final appearance as Sarah during the series' first season in "Loud Night", later returning for one episode in season 2. In an interview with Comic Book Resources, Scott Grimes, who plays Matty, discussed the episode, stating it was "no different" from the rest of the series in terms of vulgarity. He asserted the episode was not meant to alienate the audience, as serious moments were always followed by a joke. To emphasize how the episode aligns with the series, Grimes quipped that he had to "call his mother" after reading every script because of their vulgarity, and that "Loud Night" was no different. Alanna Ubach claims that the scene where Susan walks in on Blaire making out with Sarah was her favorite to film. She mentioned it required being done "over and over and over again" to be completed. The script did not call for Susan to visibly enjoy watching them kiss, but Ubach improvised her reactions, which turned out to be "funny".

Like the rest of the series, "Loud Night" was shot using Viewscreen; MacFarlane was able to act live with the cast as Ted due to Viewscreen, a technology that allows the production crew to visualize what Ted will look like in each scene in real time.

== Release and reception ==
"Loud Night" was first released on January 11, 2024, on the American streaming service Peacock, along with the rest of the first season.

Critics noted that "Loud Night" stood out from the rest of the season. Nick Schager of The Daily Beast noted the episode's blasphemous tones in his review of the entire season, describing them as "too good-natured to really offend". Angie Han of The Hollywood Reporter, also reviewing the whole season, described the sub-plot as one of Ted's "stupidest ideas", yet still called it one of the series' most memorable. Anna Govert of Paste praised the episode's emotion, calling "Loud Night" the stand-out episode of the season. Govert called the episode "sincere and moving" in its portrayal of homosexuality. Govert highlighted Susan's unwillingness to accept Blaire's sexuality as "delightful", noting it as showing her naivety on the subject in a time period like the 1990s. Jarrod Jones of The A.V. Club felt the episode "squirmed for relevance", writing that it suffered from trying to combine the series' signature comedy with a newfound political agenda. He highlighted the sub-plot of Ted believing he is Jesus as the key example of this.

In her analysis of the episode, Valerie Anne of Autostraddle commended "Loud Night" for its LGBTQ+ representation, noting the importance of having representation in series that are not directly marketed towards those groups. Reviewing the series' second season, IGN critic Rachel Weber looked back on "Loud Night" as an example of how season one never "shy[ed] away from difficult topics", praising the episode as "beautifully done". After its release, actor Scott Grimes would go on to praise Giorgia Whigham's acting in the episode, citing it as the reason it worked. He said that her reactions to Matty's "inequality that he treats everybody with" was representative of her as an actress. Grimes also gave praise towards Matty's dialogue in the episode, particularly the line of him discussing how he was raised, interpreting it as showing how much Matty's father can be seen in the character.
