= My Two Dads (Ted) =

- Ted episode
- John (top) and Ted (bottom) spy on the security guard at Clive's birthday party.
- Episode no.: Season 1 Episode 2
- Directed by: Seth MacFarlane
- Written by: Paul Corrigan; Brad Walsh
- Original air date: January 11, 2024
- Running time: 39 minutes

Episode chronology
← Previous "Just Say Yes"	Next → "Ejectile Dysfunction"

"My Two Dads" is the second episode of the American fantasy comedy series Ted. Written by Paul Corrigan and Brad Walsh, and directed by series creator Seth MacFarlane, it premiered on the American streaming service Peacock, along with the rest of season one, on January 11, 2024. The series acts as a precursor to the Ted film franchise, showcasing the childhood lives of the protagonists.

The series, set in 1993, focuses on John Bennett (Max Burkholder), the series' primary protagonist, an awkward high-school aged boy; along with Ted (MacFarlane), the series' titular anthropomorphic teddy bear. The two live with John's family, Susan (Alanna Ubach), his mild mannered mother, and Matty (Scott Grimes), his conservative father. Also residing with the family is Blaire (Giorgia Whigham), his radically liberal cousin who often clashes with Matty. In the episode, John and Ted prank their school bully, Clive (Jack Seavor McDonald), by pretending to be his father, but end up having to pull off a bigger lie than expected when they feel remorse for their actions. Concurrently, Matty refuses to go to his colonoscopy.

The scene of Matty saying that he masturbated a dog required multiple takes, as Grimes' acting made his co-stars laugh. Burkholder enjoyed the final version of the episode, both for the Pippin scene, and for the fact that an improvised line by him was left in. Upon release, the episode received generally positive reviews from critics, but Matty's line, "I jacked off a dog", was polarizing amongst reviewers.

== Plot ==
After a confrontation with their bully Clive, John and Ted decide to exact revenge on him. At home, Susan informs Matty about his upcoming colonoscopy, to which he refuses to go. When Susan tells the family that she had one herself previously without telling Matty, Blaire mocks Matty, and he storms off. Ted and John are told by Susan that Clive does not have a father, and they call him; pretending to be his father, they instruct Clive to go to a restaurant the following day to meet him. John and Ted watch Clive go to the restaurant, and they—still pretending to be his father—call him from outside, telling Clive how disappointing he is. Clive runs off crying, and John and Ted feel remorse, especially after hearing the next day that Clive attempted suicide.

The two call Clive as his father, and apologize, saying they will meet again at an undisclosed, future date. Blaire asks Matty why he refuses to get a colonoscopy, and he reveals that he has a secret he is worried he might tell the doctors while under anesthesia. After Blaire persuades him, Matty agrees to go to his colonoscopy, on the condition that she comes with him to assure his secret is not told. John and Ted again call Clive as his father, and Clive talks about his upcoming birthday. Feeling bad that they are still lying, John and Ted decide to steal a gift for Clive to make him believe his father still cares, but they are caught by security. The security guard tells them that he always wanted to be an actor, and he sings them a song from the musical Pippin. Seeing an opportunity, John and Ted get the guard to agree to go to Clive's surprise party they are throwing and act as his father.

At the colonoscopy, Blaire hides under a gurney, and, in the room, overhears the doctors mocking Matty's genitalia, horrifying her. At home, Blaire reveals what the doctors said, and pushes Matty to reveal his secret, and he yells out that, in the Vietnam War, he was forced to masturbate a dog; despite being disgusted, the family comforts Matty over his trauma. At the party, the security guard meets with Clive, but unknowingly tells him that he is not his father. Clive almost beats John and Ted up, but decides to let them go for being kind to him.

== Production ==
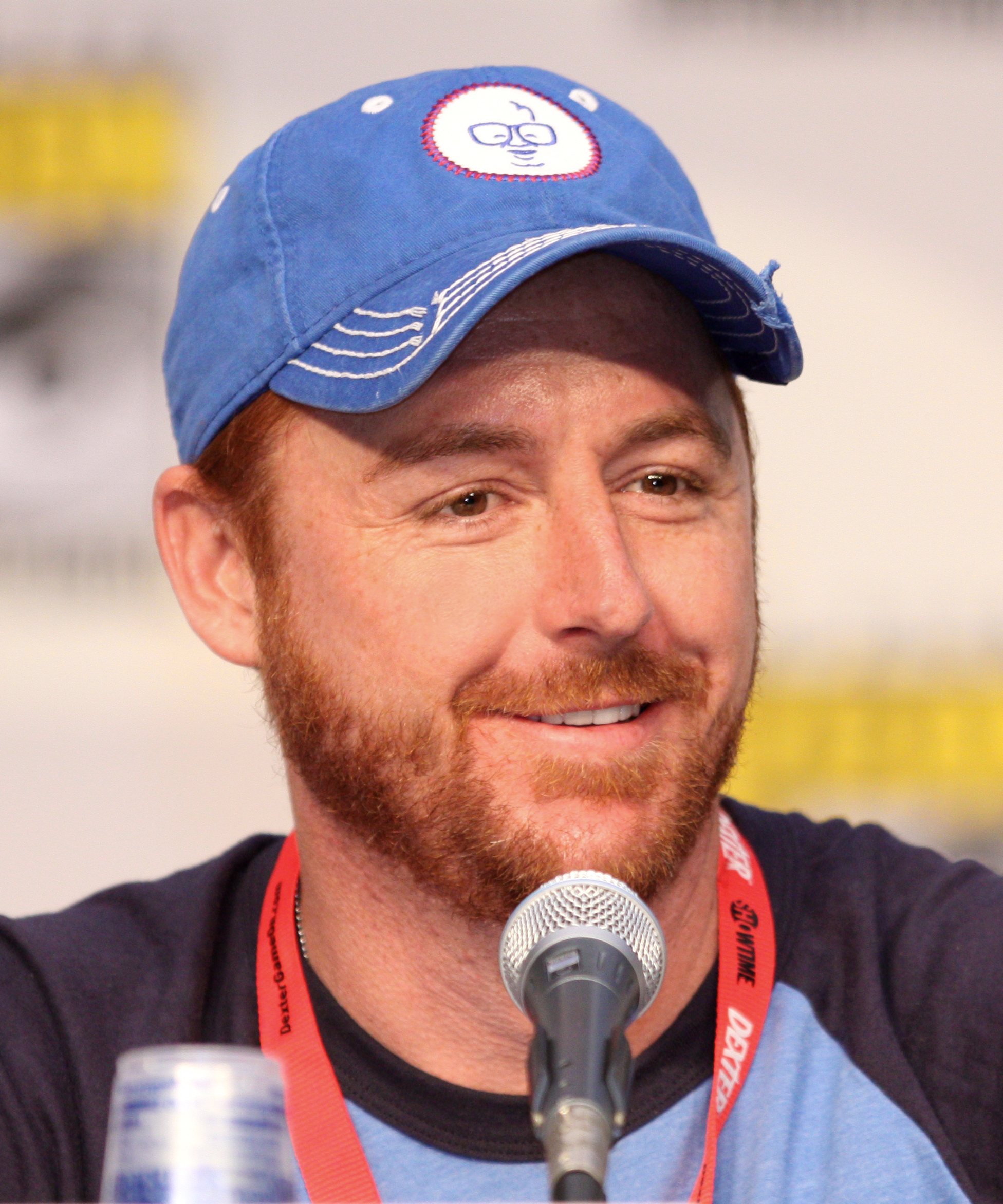
Scott Grimes (pictured) made his co-stars, specifically Max Burkholder, laugh during his monologue about masturbating a dog.

"My Two Dads" was directed by series creator and lead Seth MacFarlane and written by Paul Corrigan and Brad Walsh. During the filming of the scene where Matty reveals that he masturbated a dog, Scott Grimes kept making his co-stars laugh, notably Max Burkholder, who recalled that Grimes' "cup[ping]" of his face, accompanied by him staring directly into his eyes, made him laugh. By the end of it all, the scene took about 30 takes before it was completed. Jack Seavor McDonald guest stars in the episode as John and Ted's school bully, Clive.

Walsh and Corrigan explained in an interview with Screen Rant that the episode was their favorite to work on, particularly since it showed them the "story-breaking" process of writing, where multiple other collaborators assist them in making the narrative coherent. It also helped them see how MacFarlane works and figure out his writing style. Burkholder was pleased with the improvision they were allowed to do in "My Two Dads", particularly with a bit he thought of while shooting a scene that was kept in the final episode. Like the rest of the series, the episode was shot using Viewscreen; MacFarlane was able to act live with the cast as Ted due to ViewScreen, a technology that allows the production crew to visualize what Ted will look like in each scene in real time.

== Release and reception ==
"My Two Dads" was first released on January 11, 2024, on the American streaming service Peacock, along with the rest of the first season.

Burkholder praised the security guard's Pippin scene for being "fucking hilarious", singling it out as one of his favorite moments from the first season. William Jackson of The Ramapo News noted that the colonoscopy storyline of the episode was one of the many "interesting" plots that the series was able to get out of the family's dynamic, something unexplored in either of the Ted films.

/Film writer Ethan Anderton asserted that episodes like "My Two Dads" showed how the series could subvert tropes of family sitcoms in a high quality manner, notably through John and Ted getting revenge on Clive; instead of ending it on them learning a lesson—which the episode pretends it's going to do—it shows the two attempting to cheer Clive up themselves. Furthermore, United Press International writer Fred Topel used the episode as an example of how the series' use of older sitcom tropes is expanded upon in a unique way, like with how "absurdly elaborate" the prank is, and how they even get adults to help them with it.

Screen Rant writer Ben Sherlock hailed Matty's "I jacked off a dog" line as the second-best quote from the season. Sherlock highlighted Grimes' "ensuing monologue" following the line, describing its delivery as reminiscent of the film The Deer Hunter (1978). Oppositely, John Nugent of Empire felt the line was one of the series' weakest moments, especially as one of the final culminating gags of an episode.
