= Desperately Seeking Susan (Ted) =

- Ted episode
- Ted, acting as a marriage counselor for Susan and Matty. The vulgar counseling scene received positive reception from critics, with praise going towards Alanna Ubach's performance.
- Episode no.: Season 1 Episode 5
- Directed by: Seth MacFarlane
- Written by: Seth MacFarlane
- Original air date: January 11, 2024
- Running time: 33 minutes

Guest appearance
- Francesca Xuereb as Erin Lyons

Episode chronology
← Previous "Subways, Bicycles and Automobiles"	Next → "Loud Night"

"Desperately Seeking Susan" is the fifth episode of the American fantasy comedy series Ted. Written and directed by series creator Seth MacFarlane, it premiered on the American streaming service Peacock, along with the rest of season one, on January 11, 2024. The series acts as a precursor to the Ted film franchise, showcasing the childhood lives of the protagonists.

The series, set in 1993, focuses on John Bennett (Max Burkholder), the series' primary protagonist, an awkward high-school aged boy; along with Ted (MacFarlane), the series' titular anthropomorphic teddy bear. The two live with John's family, Susan (Alanna Ubach), his mild mannered mother, and Matty (Scott Grimes), his conservative father. Also residing with the family is Blaire (Giorgia Whigham), his radically liberal cousin whom often clashes with Matty. In the episode, Blaire attempts to get to the heart of Susan and Matty's relationship, advising them to go to marriage counseling. Concurrently, Susan becomes a substitute English teacher.

The episode helped Ted establish the grounds for Susan and Matty's relationship, an aspect of "Desperately Seeking Susan" that Ubach praised. Burkholder felt that he had grown comfortable with the series during the production of the episode. Upon release, the episode received mixed reviews from critics, with some scenes being labeled as standouts of the season, while others were criticized.

== Plot ==
After getting high, Ted and John go to greet the family, when the lights suddenly go out. Matty goes to investigate and claims the breaker box is broken, and so Susan and Blaire go, fixing it immediately and finding a spider on the box. Blaire mocks Matty for being afraid of the spider, and he leaves angrily; Blaire claims Matty's immediate leaving of every argument is the reason he and Susan have a poor marriage, and she suggests marriage counseling. Blaire agrees to pay for a session herself, and Matty reluctantly accepts. At Ted and John's class, Erin, a popular cheerleader, mocks their English teacher's outfit, causing him to break down and yell about his wife leaving him, and he is subsequently fired.

When the counselor condemns Matty, he angrily leaves the session early, and Blaire suggests that Susan and Matty should find a neutral party to dissect their relationship. Matty settles on Ted, who agrees to do it for John's sake. Ted asks them inappropriate questions about their sex life, before asking what attracted them to each other. Susan tells a story of how, after leaving a Simon & Garfunkel concert, her and Matty went on a picnic and danced in a park together to Sonny & Cher. She also reveals that she went to college and majored in teaching, but never pursued the career due to her marriage. Blaire asks Ted and John to help get Susan a teaching job, and the two go to the principal with the offer, who hires her to fill in the English teacher position. Susan thanks John and Ted for getting her the job, and agrees to try it out.

While teaching a lesson on poems, Susan's attire is mocked by Erin, but Susan doesn't realize this. Upset, Ted criticizes Erin's hypersexuality and obvious rhinoplasty, and she runs out crying. Susan goes to comfort Erin, telling her a story of how sensitive she was about her ears when she was younger, but she got over it when she saw a girl with destroyed ears due to prenatal tobacco exposure; Erin apologizes. At home, Susan talks about her day, but says she doesn't want to continue being a teacher. Blaire asks why, and Susan says that the job isn't for her, and that she prefers being a housewife. Later, Blaire commends Ted and John for helping Susan, telling them that they're good people.

== Production ==
"Desperately Seeking Susan" was written and directed by series creator and lead Seth MacFarlane. During production of the episode, John's actor Max Burkholder felt that he had "settled into a nice flow" regarding his role on the series, which he has instantly nervous for, due to the prominence of his character. He attributed this newfound comfort to the sets being "kind, welcoming, and opening". Francesca Xuereb guest stars in the episode as Erin, the cheerleader who mocks Susan.

Alanna Ubach compared the episode's exploration of Susan and Matty to the philosophy concept of yin and yang.

The episode uniquely explores the relationship between Susan and Matty, something seldom seen in sitcoms about teenagers, which Alanna Ubach praised. It helped establish the reason for Matty and Susan to stay together and gave them a "necessary" backstory, which Ubach said she was excited to do, mainly due to her not understanding herself why Susan is with Matty, calling the episode an "a-ha moment" for her character. By diving into the details of their relationship, Ubach commended the episode in an interview with Screen Rant for further proving that, despite their opposite personalities, Susan and Matty were the yin to each other's yang. Like the rest of the series, the episode was shot using ViewScreen; MacFarlane was able to act live with the cast as Ted due to Viewscreen, a technology that allows the production crew to visualize what Ted will look like in each scene in real time.

== Release and reception ==
"Desperately Seeking Susan" was first released on January 11, 2024, on the American streaming service Peacock, along with the rest of the first season.

MovieWeb writer Greg Archer wrote highly of the scene where Ted performs marriage counseling for Susan and Matty, particularly his line, "What about anal?", to which Susan responds that she likes the room to be clean. Archer considered this scene to be "MacFarlane at his best", and an example of how well Ubach was able to portray Susan's naivety. Similarly, Rendy Jones of RogerEbert.com felt the episode's vulgar marriage counselor scene was an example of the series utilizing Ted's character for more edgy plots, which he asserted worked in its favor, despite feeling "recycled" at points. According to The Minnesota Star Tribune's Neal Justin, Ted and John helping Susan "break out" of her role as a housewife prove how sweet and noble the two are throughout the season, an aspect he praises and uses as one of the primary reasons for why he enjoys the series.

The scenes of John and Ted discussing the metatextual existence of the song "Monster Mash"—how it is a song titled "Monster Mash" about a separate, fake song also entitled "Monster Mash"—were highlighted by /Film's Ethan Anderton, who felt they were exemplary of MacFarlane's expertise at writing "peculiar pop culture references, and extensive observations about the oddities of everyday life". However, IndieWire's Ben Travers criticized the "Monster Mash" scenes, writing that they were an example of the series making subpar jokes that feel similar to the writing style of MacFarlane's other show, Family Guy (1999–present), without creating a compelling narrative.
