= Seth MacFarlane filmography =

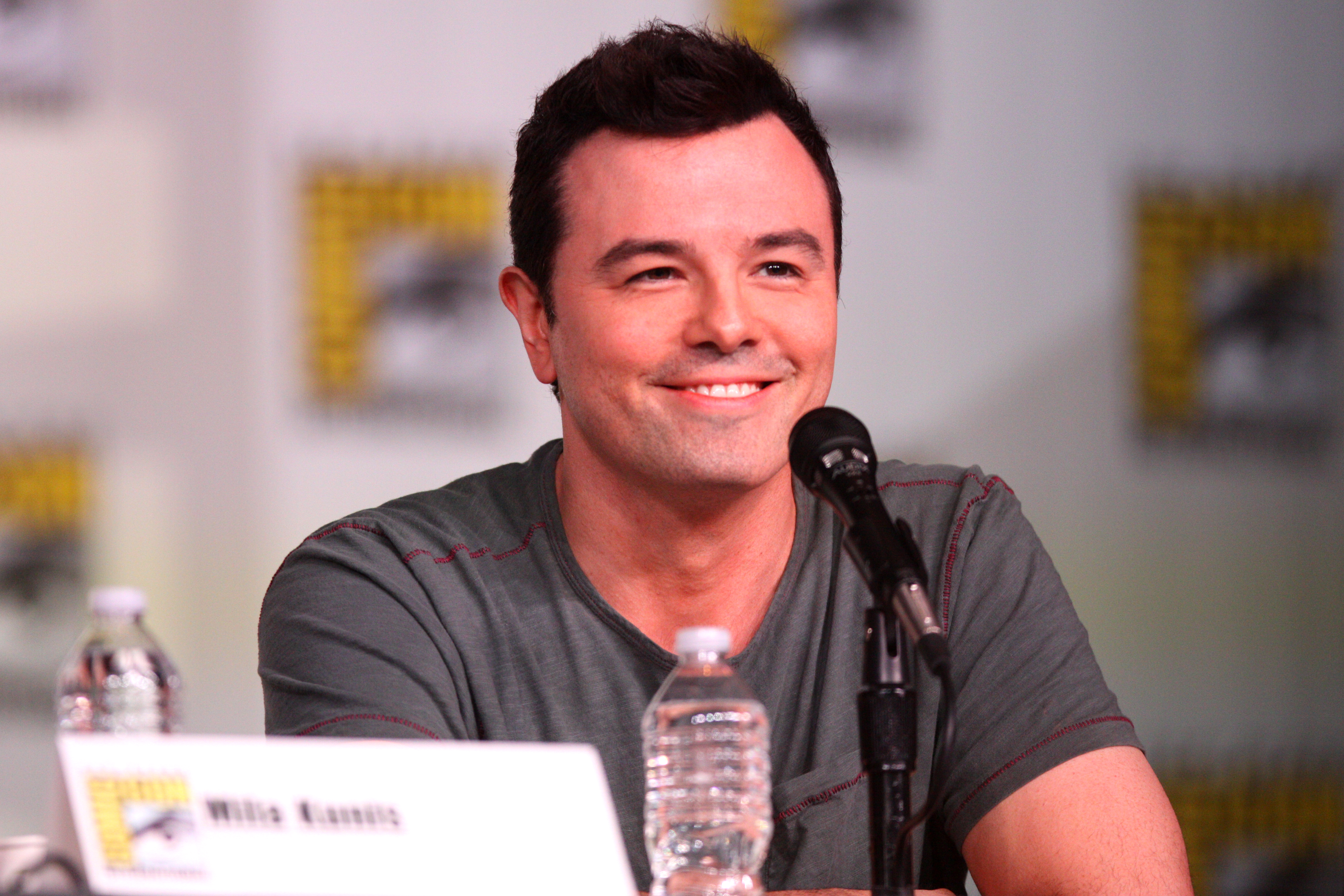
MacFarlane at San Diego Comic-Con, July 2012

Seth MacFarlane is an American actor, animator, filmmaker, comedian, and singer. MacFarlane began his career as an animator and writer for Hanna-Barbera for several television series, including Johnny Bravo, Cow and Chicken, Dexter's Laboratory, and created a sequel to his college thesis film Larry & Steve.

Since 1999, MacFarlane has served as creator, writer, executive producer, and lead voice actor in the adult animated sitcom Family Guy on Fox. He voices the characters of Peter Griffin, Stewie Griffin, Brian Griffin and Glenn Quagmire, among other characters. The series has garnered critical acclaim with critics and audiences and has won numerous awards. Since then, MacFarlane has co-created, co-writes, executive produces and lead voices in Fox's American Dad! and wrote, co-created, executive produced, and had a supporting voice role in The Cleveland Show, which was a spin-off of Family Guy. In 2012, MacFarlane made his feature film directorial debut for Universal Pictures with Ted, a fantasy comedy which was well received by critics and audiences. He went on to act, write, produce, and direct two more features for Universal—the western comedy A Million Ways to Die in the West (2014) and a sequel to his first film Ted 2 (2015). In 2017, MacFarlane created his fourth show, The Orville. He has also appeared in the films Hellboy II: The Golden Army (2008), Futurama: Into the Wild Green Yonder (2009), The Drawn Together Movie: The Movie! (2010), Tooth Fairy (2010), Movie 43 (2013), Sing (2016), and Logan Lucky (2017).

MacFarlane has received numerous awards and nominations for his work on film, television, music, and video games. He has also received twenty-three Emmy Award nominations, winning five for Family Guy. His directorial film debut in Ted earned him an Academy Award nomination for Best Original Song. In addition, he has received five Grammy Award nominations and two British Academy of Film and Television Arts among others.

Key
†	Denotes works that have not yet been released

== Film ==
Year	Title	Credited as				Role	Notes	Ref.
Year	Title	Director	Writer	Producer	Actor	Role	Notes	Ref.
1995	The Life of Larry	Yes	Yes	Yes	Yes	Larry, Steve, Lois (voice), Himself	Student film	
2005	Inside the CIA	Yes	Yes	Executive	Yes	Stan Smith, Roger (voice)	Short film	
2005	Stewie Griffin: The Untold Story	No	No	Executive	Yes	Peter Griffin, Stewie Griffin, Brian Griffin, Glenn Quagmire, Various voices	Direct-to-video	
2006	Life is Short	No	No	No	Yes	Dr. Ned	Short film	
2008	The Negotiating Table	No	Yes	No	Yes	Alan Richdale (voice)	Short film	
2008	Hellboy II: The Golden Army	No	No	No	Yes	Johann Kraus (voice)		
2009	Futurama: Into the Wild Green Yonder	No	No	No	Yes	Mars Vegas Singer (voice)	Direct-to-video	
2010	The Drawn Together Movie: The Movie!	No	No	No	Yes	I.S.R.A.E.L. (voice)	Direct-to-video	
2010	Tooth Fairy	No	No	No	Yes	Ziggy		
2012	Ted	Yes	Yes	Yes	Yes	Ted (voice and motion capture)		
2013	Movie 43	No	No	No	Yes	Himself	Cameo	
2014	A Million Ways to Die in the West	Yes	Yes	Yes	Yes	Albert Stark		
2015	Ted 2	Yes	Yes	Yes	Yes	Ted (voice and motion capture)		
2016	Sing	No	No	No	Yes	Mike (voice)		
2017	Logan Lucky	No	No	No	Yes	Max Chilblain		
2024	May the 12th Be with You	No	No	No	Yes	Stewie Griffin (voice)	Short film	
2025	The Naked Gun	No	No	Yes	No	—N/a		

=== As executive producer only ===
Year	Title	Notes	Ref.
2015	This Changes Everything	Documentary	
2020	aTypical Wednesdays		
2020	Books of Blood		

== Television ==
Key
†	Denotes television productions that have not yet been released

Year	Title	Credited as					Role	Notes	Ref.
Year	Title	Creator	Director	Writer	Producer	Actor	Role	Notes	Ref.
1996	Jungle Cubs	No	No	Yes	No	No		2 episodes	
1996–1999	Ace Ventura: Pet Detective	No	No	Yes	No	No		4 episodes	
1997	What a Cartoon!	No	Yes	Yes	No	Yes	Larry, Steve (voice)	Episode: "Larry & Steve"	
1997–2004	Johnny Bravo	No	No	Yes	No	Yes	Scott, Bird Forema, Mr. Magician (voice)	10 episodes Also storyboard artist for 3 episodes Voice episode: "Traffic Troubles/My Funny Looking Friend"	
1997–1998	Dexter's Laboratory	No	No	Yes	No	No		4 episodes Also storyboard artist for 2 episodes	
1997	Cow and Chicken	No	No	Yes	No	No		3 episodes Also storyboard artist for 2 episodes	
1998	Oh Yeah! Cartoons	No	No	Yes	No	No		Episode: "Zoomates"	
1999–present	Family Guy	Yes	No	Yes	Executive	Yes	Peter Griffin, Stewie Griffin, Brian Griffin, Glenn Quagmire, Various voices		
2002–2003	Gilmore Girls	No	No	No	No	Yes	Zach Bob Merriam, Folk singer (voice)	3 episodes	
2003	Will & Grace	No	No	No	No	Yes	Pencil Sharpener (voice)	Episode: "Fagmalion Part II: Attack of the Clones"	
2003	3 South	No	No	No	No	Yes	Max (voice)	Episode: "Cock Tale"	
2003	Aqua Teen Hunger Force	No	No	No	No	Yes	Wayne the Brain McClain (voice)	Episode: "Super Trivia"	
2003	The Pitts	No	No	No	Consulting	Yes	Radio Announcer, Movie Dad and Son (voice)	7 episodes Voice episode: 2 episodes	
2003–2005	Crank Yankers	No	No	No	No	Yes	Dick Rogers, Arthur Johnson (voice)	4 episodes	
2004–2005	Star Trek: Enterprise	No	No	No	No	Yes	Ensign Rivers	2 episodes	
2005–present	American Dad!	Yes	No	Yes	Executive	Yes	Stan Smith, Roger, Various voices		
2005–2021	Robot Chicken	No	No	No	No	Yes	Various voices	28 episodes	
2006–2009	Late Show with David Letterman	No	No	No	No	Yes	Peter Griffin, Stewie Griffin (voice)	2 episodes	
2006	The War at Home	No	No	No	No	Yes	Hillary's Date	Episode: "I Wash My Hands of You"	
2006	Help Me Help You	No	No	No	No	Yes	Seth	Episode: "Moving On"	
2006	Mad TV	No	No	No	No	Yes	Himself	Episode: "12.5"	
2007	59th Primetime Emmy Awards	No	No	No	No	Yes	Stewie Griffin, Brian Griffin (voice)	TV special	
2008	Yin Yang Yo!	No	No	No	No	Yes	The Manotaur (voice)	2 episodes	
2009	Bones	No	No	No	No	Yes	Stewie Griffin (voice)	Episode: "The Critic in the Cabernet"	
2009–2010	FlashForward	No	No	No	No	Yes	Agent Jake Curdy	2 episodes	
2009–2013	The Cleveland Show	Yes	No	Yes	Executive	Yes	Tim the Bear, Various voices	88 episodes	
2009	Family Guy Presents: Seth & Alex's Almost Live Comedy Show	No	No	Yes	Executive	Yes	Himself	TV special	
2010	Comedy Central Roast of David Hasselhoff	No	No	No	No	Yes	Himself (host)	TV special	
2010	Phineas and Ferb	No	No	No	No	Yes	Jeff McGarland (voice)	Episode: "Nerds of a Feather"	
2011	Comedy Central Roast of Donald Trump	No	No	No	No	Yes	Himself (host)	TV special	
2011	Comedy Central Roast of Charlie Sheen	No	No	No	No	Yes	Himself (host)	TV special	
2011	Seth MacFarlane: Swingin' in Concert	No	No	Yes	Executive	Yes	Himself	TV special	
2012	Saturday Night Live	No	No	No	No	Yes	Himself (host)	Episode: "Seth MacFarlane/Frank Ocean"	
2012–2018	Jimmy Kimmel Live!	No	No	No	No	Yes	Ted, Peter Griffin, Stewie Griffin (voice)	2 episodes	
2013	85th Academy Awards	No	No	Yes	No	Yes	Himself (host) Ted (voice)	TV special	
2013	The Simpsons	No	No	No	No	Yes	Ben (voice)	Episode: "Dangers on a Train"	
2013	Futurama	No	No	No	No	Yes	Seymour (voice)	Episode: "Game of Tones"	
2014	Cosmos: A Spacetime Odyssey	No	No	No	Executive	Yes	Giordano Bruno (voice)	13 episodes Voice episode: "Standing Up in the Milky Way"	
2014	2015 Breakthrough Prize Ceremony	No	No	Yes	No	Yes	Himself (host)	TV special	
2015	2016 Breakthrough Prize Ceremony	No	No	Yes	No	Yes	Himself (host)	TV special	
2016	Bordertown	No	No	No	Executive	Yes	Peter Griffin (voice)	13 episodes Voice episode: "American Doll"	
2017–2022	The Orville	Yes	Yes	Yes	Executive	Yes	Ed Mercer	36 episodes	
2019	The Loudest Voice	No	No	No	No	Yes	Brian Lewis	5 episodes	
2020	Cosmos: Possible Worlds	No	No	No	Executive	Yes	Harry S. Truman (voice)	13 episodes Voice episode: 3 episodes	
2022	The End is Nye	Yes	No	No	Executive	Yes	Various roles	6 episodes	
2024–2026	Ted	Yes	Yes	Yes	Executive	Yes	Ted (voice and motion capture), Bill Clinton (voice)	15 episodes, Bill Clinton: The Sword in the Stoned	
2026–present	Ted: The Animated Series †	Yes	No	Yes	Executive	Yes	Ted (voice)		
2027	Stewie †	Yes	No	Yes	Executive	Yes	Stewie Griffin, Brian Griffin, Bean (voice)		

=== As executive producer only ===
Year	Title	Role	Notes	Ref.
2007	The Winner	Executive producer	6 episodes	
2013–2014	Dads	Executive producer	18 episodes	
2015–2016	Blunt Talk	Executive producer	20 episodes	
2024	Good Times: Black Again	Executive producer	10 episodes	
2026	The 'Burbs	Executive producer	8 episodes	

== Video games ==
Year	Title	Role	Notes	Ref.
2006	Family Guy Video Game!	Peter Griffin, Stewie Griffin, Brian Griffin, Glenn Quagmire, Various voices		
2012	Family Guy: Back to the Multiverse	Peter Griffin, Stewie Griffin, Brian Griffin, Glenn Quagmire, Various voices		
2014	Family Guy: The Quest for Stuff	Peter Griffin, Stewie Griffin, Brian Griffin, Glenn Quagmire, Various voices		
2023	Fortnite Battle Royale	Peter Griffin (voice)		
2024	Call of Duty: Black Ops 6	Stan Smith, Roger	DLC	

== Web ==
Year	Title	Role	Notes	Ref.
2008–2009	Seth MacFarlane's Cavalcade of Cartoon Comedy	Various voices	50 episodes; also creator, writer, and director	
2020	The At-Home Variety Show	Himself (host)	15 episodes; also writer, and executive producer	
2024	Hot Ones	Peter Griffin, Stewie Griffin (voice)	Episode: "Peter Griffin Bares It All While Eating Spicy Wings"	

== See also ==
- Seth MacFarlane discography
- List of awards and nominations received by Seth MacFarlane
