= Just Say Yes (Ted) =

- Ted episode
- Matty (left) confronts Blaire (farthest left on the couch) with the marijuana.
- Episode no.: Season 1 Episode 1
- Directed by: Seth MacFarlane
- Written by: Seth MacFarlane
- Original air date: January 11, 2024
- Running time: 50 minutes

Episode chronology
← Previous —	Next → "My Two Dads"

"Just Say Yes" is the series premiere of the American fantasy comedy series Ted. Written and directed by series creator Seth MacFarlane, it premiered on the American streaming service Peacock, along with the rest of season one, on January 11, 2024. The series acts as a precursor to the Ted film franchise, showcasing the childhood lives of the protagonists.

The episode introduces John Bennett (Max Burkholder), the series' primary protagonist, an awkward high-school aged boy, along with Ted (Seth MacFarlane), the series' titular anthropomorphic teddy bear. The two live with John's family, Susan (Alanna Ubach), his mild mannered mother, and Matty (Scott Grimes), his conservative father. Also residing with the family is Blaire (Giorgia Whigham), his radically liberal cousin whom often clashes with Matty. In the episode, Ted is forced to go to school, and John tries to help him get expelled. While attempting to find marijuana to do so, they discover that Blaire is a dealer, causing conflict within the family.

Like the rest of the season, "Just Say Yes" makes use of Viewscreen, a technology that allows the production crew to visualize what Ted's presence in each scene will look like in real time. MacFarlane agreed to do the series on the grounds that the CGI would be professionally done, and chose to do a prequel for more storytelling potential. Upon release, the episode received mixed reviews from critics, who either praised or condemned the episode's crass humor and offensive nature.

== Plot ==
John and Ted struggle to play a broken Super Mario Bros. cartridge on the Nintendo Entertainment System, and are shamed by Blaire for labeling Mario and Luigi as midgets. At dinner, Blaire continues to shame John and Ted, whilst also calling Matty out on his racist comments towards Asian people. After an argument, it is suggested that Ted should go to school with John, an idea that Ted dismisses. Home alone, Ted shoots the TV with a shotgun and invites over several prostitutes, prompting Matty to force him to attend school. At school, Ted and John go to class, where Ted mocks the teacher and suggests that his wife is having an affair; the teacher breaks down and informs him that she is having an affair, causing confusion among the class.

Ted and John discover that Shiela, John's crush, has drugs, and the two attempt to buy some to get Ted kicked out. Shiela, after some bargaining, informs them of the address of her drug supplier. Ted goes to the address, finding Blaire and her roommate selling pot. She assures him that they are selling the pot to pay for college tuition, and she agrees to give it to Ted on the grounds that he will not share it with John. Ted agrees, but still smokes it with John when the latter pressures him. After this, John and Ted go to dinner and Blaire realizes the two are high.

She threatens Ted for this, and he agrees not to partake anymore. John and Ted go to school with the weed in an attempt to get Ted kicked out, but Clive, John's bully, steals it from them. After a failed conversation with the school principal over having Ted kicked out, the boys go into Blaire's room to find more pot, but hide in a closet after she walks in with Susan. After being discovered with the pot, Matty kicks Blaire out of the house, whilst Susan is upset with Matty when she discovers that he has been charging Blaire rent. Feeling guilty, Ted retrieves a piece of Rocky memorabilia from his time in Hollywood, and uses it to bribe Matty into letting Blaire stay. He accepts, and agrees to not charge her rent anymore. Blaire thanks John and Ted, asking them not to partake in drugs anymore, which the two falsely promise.

== Production ==
"Just Say Yes" was written and directed by series creator and lead Seth MacFarlane. Following the success of the Ted film franchise, Universal Pictures approached MacFarlane about the idea for a series based on the movies. He agreed on the condition that the CGI would not be "nickel-and-dimed" and conceived the idea of a prequel to the films, mainly due to the busy schedule of Mark Wahlberg and greater storytelling potential. Peacock ordered the series in June 2021.

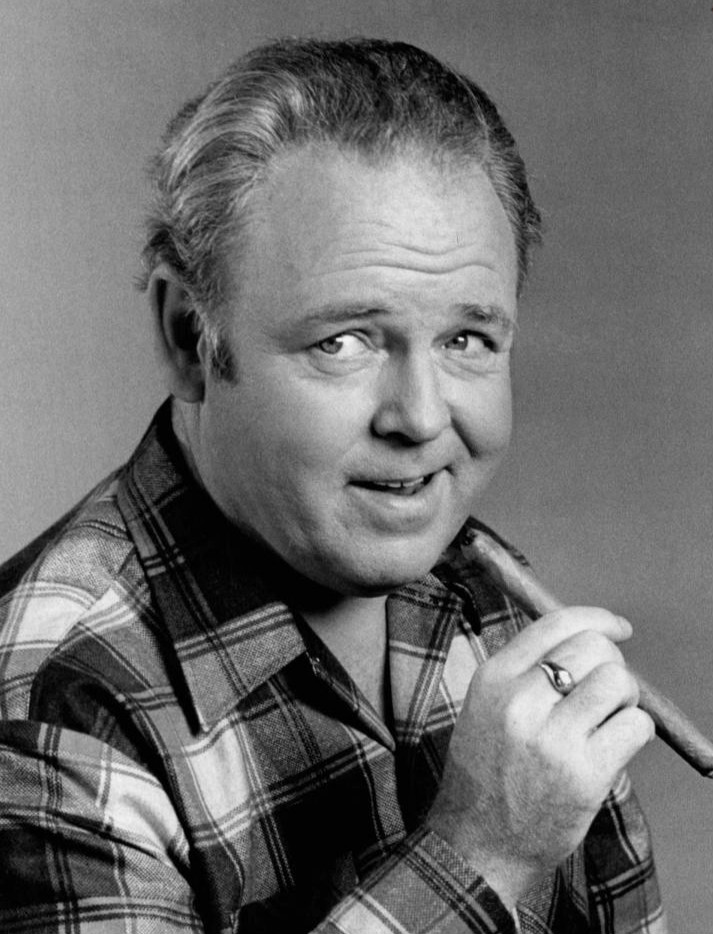
Scott Grimes was told to impersonate the mannerisms of Carroll O'Connor in his audition.

Actors Giorgia Whigham and Max Burkholder would audition for the roles of Blaire and John respectively by sending audition tapes. Both actors were given the roles after their first audition. Burkholder called MacFarlane "very good at making sure you know that you got it", noting the "reassuring" environment during his audition. Alanna Ubach also sent in tapes for her audition, but was asked to do "chemistry reads" with Scott Grimes, after which they were not told if they got the part.

Grimes says he was told to think of the CBS television series All in the Family (1971–1979) while auditioning, and to try his best at impersonating Carroll O'Connor. Ubach was asked to audition another time with Grimes, and they were both given their respective parts soon after. Prior to the first table read, the cast were given a replica of Ted and were told to practice scenes with it to "get used to [interacting] with the toy".

The name for Shiela came from staff writer Paul Corrigan during his initial meeting with MacFarlane, who reminisced about a girlfriend he had when he was younger named Sheila. Corrigan joked that "New England is one of the few places you can meet a young Sheila", which MacFarlane found humorous, so the name was subsequently added into the episode. MacFarlane was able to act live with the cast as Ted due to the series' use of ViewScreen, a technology that allows the production crew to visualize what Ted would look like in each scene in real time.

== Release and reception ==
"Just Say Yes" was first premiered on January 10, 2024, the day before its official release, at a screening in the AMC Cinema at The Grove in Los Angeles, with the cast joining the event and after-party. The episode was released to the public on January 11, 2024, on the American streaming service Peacock, along with the rest of the first season. The "super-sized" episode has been split up into two separate parts on other releases.

In a review of the season, John Nugent of Empire noted the crude humor of "Just Say Yes" as one of the series' faults, particularly the onslaught of jokes revolving around blowjobs, midgets, and racial slurs, commenting: "Is that the best you can manage?" Kennedy Unthank of Plugged In condemned the offensive, edgy humor, noting the high amount of profanity heard in the episode and jokes about sensitive topics as reasons that he's "not [a big fan] of the Ted Cinematic Universe".

On the opposite side, RogerEbert.com writer Rendy Jones highlighted the "edgy shenanigans" of Ted and John trying to get weed to get Ted expelled as working in the series' favor, asserting that, despite feeling "recycled" at times, the edgy humor succeeded when put against the live action backdrop. Commenting on the episode's polarizing offensive humor, United Press International's Fred Topel wrote that Ted's vulgar profanity was appropriate for a teenager in the 1990s. However, he did feel that some jokes, such as the scene of the family discussing racism at the dinner table, "tried a bit too hard" to be offensive.

Despite the mixed reception, "Just Say Yes" received two nominations at the 4th Astra TV Awards. Seth MacFarlane was the recipient of both, with nominations for Best Directing in a Streaming Comedy Series and Best Writing in a Streaming Comedy Series.
