= JSY =

JSY may refer to:

- Janani Suraksha Yojana, an Indian health programme
- Jersey
- Joseph State Airport, in Oregon, United States
- Just Say Yes (disambiguation)
- Syros Island National Airport, in Greece
