= United We Fall (TV series) =

2020 American sitcom television series

- Genre: Sitcom
- Created by: Julius Sharpe
- Starring: Will Sasso; Christina Vidal Mitchell; Ella Grace Helton; Guillermo Díaz; Jane Curtin
- Music by: Jeff Cardoni
- Opening theme: by Andy Paley & Julius Sharpe
- Country of origin: United States
- Original language: English
- No. of seasons: 1
- No. of episodes: 8

Production
- Executive producers: Julius Sharpe; Julia Gunn; Seth Gordon
- Producers: John Amodeo; Werner Walian
- Cinematography: Donald A. Morgan; Wayne Kennan
- Editors: David Helfand; Cheryl Campsmith
- Camera setup: Multi-camera
- Running time: 21 minutes
- Production companies: Julius Sharpe International Petroleum & Writing; Exhibit A; ABC Signature; Sony Pictures Television Studios

Original release
- Network: ABC
- Release: July 15 – August 26, 2020

United We Fall is an American television sitcom, created by Julius Sharpe, that aired from July 15 to August 26, 2020 on ABC. It starred Will Sasso and Christina Vidal Mitchell as a couple with young children whose household is turned upside down when his mother (Jane Curtin) moves in with them. In September 2020, the series was canceled after one season.

== Plot ==
A couple with young children and overzealous extended families lets the husband's judgmental mother move in with them.

== Cast ==
=== Main ===
- Will Sasso as Bill Ryan, an engineer and father with two young daughters. He and his wife Jo strive to raise their family as hands-off as possible, which often annoys his mother Sandy.
- Christina Vidal Mitchell as Jo Rodriguez, Bill's wife who works for her family's contracting firm called Chuy & Sons Construction.
- Ella Grace Helton as Emily Ryan, Bill and Jo's older daughter who is both very intelligent and slightly antisocial.
- Guillermo Díaz as Chuy Rodriguez, one of Jo's brothers who likes to offer unsolicited advice and criticize his sister for not raising her kids properly.
- Jane Curtin as Sandy Ryan, Bill's neurotic mother who moved in with him while recovering from an illness. She now lives with the family and takes every opportunity to challenge his style of parenting.

=== Recurring ===
- Ireland & Sedona Carvajal as Lulu Ryan, Bill and Jo's younger daughter
- Natalie Ceballos as Brie Rodriguez, Chuy's wife.
- Juan Alfonso as Javier Rodriguez, one of Jo's brothers.
- J. R. Villarreal as Felix Rodriguez, one of Jo's brothers.

=== Guest stars ===
- Gloria Calderón Kellett as Ms. Molina, the head of Lulu's daycare. ("The Biter")
- Sarah Levy as Kendra, a parent of Lulu's classmate. ("The Biter")
- Sam McMurray as Dave Plonker, Sandy's first husband. ("My Favorite Marta" and "You're Doing It Wrong")
- Olivia Taylor Cohen as Marta Rodriguez, Chuy's daughter. ("My Favorite Marta" and "You're Doing It Wrong")
- Craig Kilborn as Dr. Sharpe, Sandy's doctor. ("My Favorite Marta")
- Greg Romero Wilson as Benicio Rodriguez, one of Jo's brothers, who is very negative. ("The Weekend" and "Re-Wedding Crashers")

== Episodes ==
No.	Title	Directed by	Written by	Original release date	Viewers (millions)
1	"Pilot"	Mark Cendrowski	Julius Sharpe	July 15, 2020	4.23
Bill and Jo are two young parents with an infant daughter, Lulu, and an older daughter named Emily, who is having trouble in school due to her inability to make friends. Bill's mother Sandy and Jo's brother Chuy both tell Bill and Jo that they are failing their daughter as parents and need to step up. In response, the couple decide to start living "positive" and ignore anyone who criticizes their parenting style. When Emily's teacher compliments her for her critical thinking skills, Bill invites Sandy and Chuy for drinks so he can gloat, but the evening takes a turn for the worse when Emily suddenly needs to go to the hospital. A social worker interviewing Jo implies that she is a negligent mother, which causes her to snap and go on a tirade about how much work being a parent is. On the way home, a cop pulls Bill over and tests him for drunk driving; after all this, Bill and Jo decide that they are content with the way they raise their children.
2	"The Biter"	Mark Cendrowski	Gloria Calderón Kellett & Mike Royce	July 15, 2020	3.61
At Chuy's suggestion, Bill and Jo agree to transfer Lulu to preschool instead of day-care; however, she gets in trouble on her first day for biting another student. Bill and Jo assume that the school will simply ignore the incident, but the next day, Lulu kisses the same student and the boy's parents demand that the teacher, Ms. Molina, do something. She holds a meeting with the two sides, where Bill and Jo refuse to apologize for Lulu's actions and admit that they don't care about being more involved with her schooling. Ms. Molina pulls them aside and reveals that she is sympathetic, promising to keep Lulu out of trouble for the rest of the year. Sandy does a DNA ancestry kit to prove her theory that the Ryan family has Italian roots. Instead, she learns that their heritage is largely Dutch.
3	"Date Night"	Mark Cendrowski	Chadd Gindin	July 22, 2020	3.71
Wanting a night out for some fun, Jo and Bill take up Chuy's invitation to tag along to a concert with him and his wife, Brie, as a date night. However, they soon discover their night of fun is anything but, due to Chuy's "rules" for date night. Meanwhile, Sandy babysits Emily and Lulu, with disastrous results.
4	"Participation Trophy"	Mark Cendrowski	Jessica Combs & Stephanie Escajeda & Carissa Kosta	July 29, 2020	3.57
On an attempt to get Emily interested in something other than her tablet, Bill and Jo enroll her in her Uncle Chuy's soccer clinic; Sandy's infamous gift giving gets out of hand.
5	"My Favorite Marta"	Gloria Calderón Kellett	Sean Clements	August 5, 2020	3.27
When she learns that Chuy is a strict parent, Jo tries to take her niece Marta under her wing to give her some independence. However, it backfires when Marta refuses to go home, and has to stay with the Ryans. Meanwhile, while still recovering from a colonoscopy, Sandy reveals to Bill that she had a brief first marriage. Intrigued, Bill tries to track him down to reunite them.
6	"You're Doing It Wrong"	Victor Gonzalez	Julieanne Smolinski	August 12, 2020	3.17
With Marta refusing to come home, Chuy and Brie kick her out of the house, and Jo has to deal with both parenting a teenager and facing Chuy at work. Bill's idea to reintroduce Sandy to her first husband backfires as they take their new relationship too fast.
7	"The Weekend"	Mark Cendrowski	Julius Sharpe	August 19, 2020	2.85
Dreading the weekend, Bill and Jo find themselves having a booked Saturday by having to go to a funeral for Jo's cousin, and the birthday party of Jo's nephew, who is the son of her brother Benicio. Bill and Jo find themselves exhausted, which is further complicated when Benicio and Chuy's feud comes to a head in their own living room.
8	"Re-Wedding Crashers"	Mark Cendrowski	Sean Clements & Julieanne Smolinski	August 26, 2020	3.02
Completely forgetting their tenth wedding anniversary, Jo and Bill decide to renew their vows, and have a smaller version of the big wedding they had initially planned (they had initially planned a big ceremony, but ended up eloping in Puerto Rico due to fighting between their families). However, their control of the planning spirals out of control when the families all have conflicting ideas of their own.

== Production ==
=== Development ===
On February 8, 2019, it was announced that ABC had given the production a pilot order. The pilot was written by Julius Sharpe and executive produced by Sharpe, Seth Gordon and Julia Gunn. On May 11, 2019, ABC ordered the pilot to series. In March 2019, it was reported Mark Cendrowski directed the pilot.

ABC initially slated the series as a mid-season replacement for the spring of 2020, with an eight-episode order. However, upon the outbreak of the COVID-19 pandemic in March 2020, ABC left the series off the schedule. In May 2020, Deadline Hollywood reported that ABC was looking to delay the premiere for the fall lineup of the 2020–21 television season, due to the unknown length of the pandemic. The same was done at rival network Fox, where two other new scripted series, Filthy Rich and Next, were also delayed to the 2020–21 fall schedule. The series did not make ABC's fall schedule, but in June 2020, ABC announced that the series would premiere on July 15, 2020. On September 15, 2020, ABC canceled the series after one season.

=== Casting ===
It was announced in March 2019, with Will Sasso, Christina Vidal, Jane Curtin, and Jason Michael Snow in the pilot's lead roles. In September 2019, Guillermo Díaz joined the cast in a main role to replace Snow's character.

=== Filming ===
United We Fall was filmed at Sony Pictures Studios in Culver City, California, but it is set in Denver, Colorado.

== Reception ==
=== Critical response ===
On the review aggregation website Rotten Tomatoes, the series has an approval rating of 40% with an average rating of 6/10, based on 5 reviews. Metacritic gave it a weighted average score of 44 out of 100 based on 4 reviews, indicating "mixed or average reviews".

=== Ratings ===
Viewership and ratings per episode of United We Fall
No.	Title	Air date	Rating (18–49)	Viewers (millions)	DVR (18–49)	DVR viewers (millions)	Total (18–49)	Total viewers (millions)
1	"Pilot"	July 15, 2020	0.6	4.23	0.1	0.83	0.7	5.06
2	"The Biter"	July 15, 2020	0.5	3.61	0.1	0.80	0.6	4.41
3	"Date Night"	July 22, 2020	0.5	3.71	0.1	0.66	0.6	4.37
4	"Participation Trophy"	July 29, 2020	0.5	3.57	0.1	0.76	0.6	4.33
5	"My Favorite Marta"	August 5, 2020	0.5	3.27	0.1	0.74	0.6	4.01
6	"You're Doing It Wrong"	August 12, 2020	0.5	3.17	0.1	0.70	0.6	3.87
7	"The Weekend"	August 19, 2020	0.5	2.85	0.1	0.60	0.6	3.45
8	"Re-Wedding Crashers"	August 26, 2020	0.5	3.02	—N/a	—N/a	—N/a	—N/a
