= Just Say Yes =

Just Say Yes may refer to:

== Film and television ==
- "Just Say Yes" (It's a Living)
- "Just Say Yes" (Sex and the City)
- "Just Say Yes" (Sliders)
- Just Say Yes (film), a 2021 Dutch romantic comedy film
- "Just Say Yes" (Ted)

== Music ==
- Just Say Yes (compilation album), a 1987 Sire Records sampler and the album series named for it
- Just Say Yes (Punchline album), or the title song, 2008
- Just Say Yes (EP), a 2008 EP by The Narrative
- "Just Say Yes" (song), a 2009 song by Snow Patrol
- "Just Say Yes", a 1990 single by The Dickies
- "Just Say Yes", a song by Dido from Girl Who Got Away
- "Just Say Yes", a song by The Cure from Greatest Hits
- "(Do You Love Me) Just Say Yes", 1988 single by Highway 101
- Just Say Yes, a 2026 album by Ruthie Foster
