= Ted (TV series) =

2024 American fantasy comedic television series

- Genre: Comedy; Buddy; Stoner; Fantasy
- Created by: Seth MacFarlane
- Based on: Ted by Seth MacFarlane
- Directed by: Seth MacFarlane
- Starring: Seth MacFarlane; Max Burkholder; Alanna Ubach; Scott Grimes; Giorgia Whigham
- Music by: Walter Murphy
- Opening theme: "Everybody Needs a Best Friend" by Norah Jones
- Country of origin: United States
- Original language: English
- No. of seasons: 2
- No. of episodes: 15

Production
- Executive producers: Aimee Carlson; Alana Kleiman; Erica Huggins; Jason Clark; Seth MacFarlane; Paul Corrigan; Brad Walsh
- Producers: John Jacobs; Keith Raskin
- Cinematography: Jeffrey C. Mygatt
- Editors: Tom Costantino; Tony Orcena; Bart Rachmil; Justin Ulrich; Hillary Wills; Kevin Ward
- Running time: 31–51 minutes
- Production companies: Fuzzy Door Productions; MRC; Universal Content Productions

Original release
- Network: Peacock
- Release: January 11, 2024 – March 5, 2026

Related
- Ted; Ted 2

Ted (stylized as ted) is an American fantasy stoner comedy television series created and directed by Seth MacFarlane for Peacock. The third installment in the Ted franchise, it serves as a prequel to the first film and the sequel. It is produced by Fuzzy Door Productions, MRC, and Universal Content Productions and stars MacFarlane reprising his role as the voice of the titular character, alongside Max Burkholder, Alanna Ubach, Scott Grimes, and Giorgia Whigham.

Ted premiered on Peacock on January 11, 2024. In May 2024, the series was renewed for a second season, which premiered on March 5, 2026. That same month, MacFarlane confirmed that there were no plans for a third season, citing the show's high production costs.

== Premise ==
Set between 1993 and 1995, in between the opening sequence and main plot of Ted (2012), this spin-off series depicts the early life of a sentient teddy bear named Ted, as he lives with 16-year-old John Bennett and his family in Framingham, Massachusetts. In addition to John and Ted, the Bennett household includes John's father Matty, his mother Susan, and his cousin, Blaire, who is living with them while attending a college nearby. In the pilot episode, Ted is forced to attend school with John from then on, due to the trouble he causes while the rest of the family are at school and work.

== Cast and characters ==
=== Main ===
- Seth MacFarlane as the voice and motion capture for Ted, a brash, foul-mouthed, anthropomorphic teddy bear and former celebrity whom John wished to life when he was a child.
  - Tara Strong as Ted's "I Love You" sound bite replay function.
  - MacFarlane also portrays Bill Clinton in the second season
- Max Burkholder as John Bennett, a 16-year-old boy who is best friends with Ted and is near the bottom of the social ladder at John Hancock High.
- Alanna Ubach as Susan Bennett, John's gullible, caring, soft-spoken, mild-mannered, stay-at-home mother. She was previously named Helen in the opening sequence of Ted.
- Scott Grimes as Matty Bennett, John's quick-tempered Republican father who is a Vietnam veteran and is prone to many paranoid theories and irrational fears. He was previously named Steve in the opening sequence in Ted.
- Giorgia Whigham as Blaire Bennett, John's intelligent, sardonic liberal cousin and Matty and Susan's niece, who attends Emerson College and lives with the Bennetts because of her own dysfunctional family. She is protective of John and Ted and tries to keep them out of trouble.

=== Recurring ===
- Marissa Shankar as Sarah, Blaire's girlfriend who sells marijuana to pay for tuition
- Ara Hollyday as Andrew, a classmate of John and Ted, and the boyfriend of Polly
- Liz Richman as Polly, a classmate of John and Ted, and the girlfriend of Andrew

=== Guest ===
- Penny Johnson Jerald as Principal Bernard
- Ian McKellen as the Narrator
- Charly Jordan as Sheila Borgwat
- Gail Goldberg as Gert Fechko
- Jack Seavor McDonald as Clive
- Erin Moore as Jessica
- Francesca Xuereb as Erin Lyons
- Don Lake as Bert
- Dana Gould as Priest
- Danny Jolles as Will
- Tim Russ as ER Doctor

==== Season 1 ====
- Mike Henry as Bank Employee
- Charlotte Fountain-Jardim as Bethany Borgwat
- Julius Sharpe as Mr. George
- John Viener as Dr. Frankel
- Audrey Wasilewski as Muriel
- Marc Jablon as Restaurant Manager
- JD Cullum as Lloyd
- Chris Coppola and Jim Kane as Video Store Clerks
- Tom Costello as Coach
- Connor Keene as Kevin
- Brendan Jennings as Ostrich Owner
- Josh Stamberg as Professor Lucas Damon
- Ivar Brogger as Father Odell
- Jason Kravits as Mr. Maynard
- Paul Schackman as Sandy

==== Season 2 ====
- Scott Michael Campbell as Bernie Bennett
- Peter Macon as Avery Lawrence
- Michaela McManus as Charlotte Robicheck
- Ross Partridge as David Robichek
- Brett Rickaby as Dr. Lukert
- Jessica Lundy as Arlene Goldbaum
- Brennan Lee Mulligan as Chris
- Derek Mears as Dral'hul
- Martin Klebba as Merchant
- Matt Gottlieb as Cultist
- Brooke Dillman as Mildred Crohn
- Matthew Bellows as Mr. Donnelly
- Tom Plumley as Ricky
- Nik Dodani as Nimeet Farooq
- Adargiza De Los Santos as Bitch Killer
- Asha Etchison as Half Foot
- Jen Kober as Guard
- Michael Patrick McGill as Bartender
- Jeremy Ratchford as Bar Patron

== Episodes ==
=== Series overview ===
Season	Episodes	Originally released
1	7	January 11, 2024
2	8	March 5, 2026

=== Season 1 (2024) ===
No. overall	No. in season	Title	Directed by	Written by	Original release date
1	1	"Just Say Yes"	Seth MacFarlane	Seth MacFarlane	January 11, 2024
After causing one too many mishaps while home alone, Ted is mandated to start attending high school with John. After multiple attempts to get himself expelled, he discovers that Blaire sells marijuana to pay the rent that Matty charges her, and she reluctantly supplies him with some. After Ted gets both himself and John hooked on the substance, Matty evicts Blaire from his house after finding out about her drug business. She explains to John and Ted that she insists on living with them instead of her dysfunctional birth family because she sees potential in her cousin and wants to look out for him. Ted bribes Matty with the real mouthguard from Rocky in exchange for letting Blaire stay, and he complies. John and Ted promise Blaire that they will not do drugs again, but secretly agree to still smoke pot.
2	2	"My Two Dads"	Seth MacFarlane	Paul Corrigan & Brad Walsh	January 11, 2024
After being attacked in the bathroom, John and Ted get back at Clive, the school bully, with a prank call in which they pretend to be his absentee father and humiliate him in public. Despite succeeding, the two feel guilty over hurting his feelings and continue pretending to be Clive's father in hopes of bettering his life, something they quickly grow to enjoy doing. However, things come to a head when Clive becomes more interested in meeting his father in person at his birthday party. John and Ted hire a mall cop and aspiring actor to pose as Clive's father, but the ruse is quickly discovered. Although angry, Clive comes to realize that their actions truly did help him out, and they all enjoy Clive's birthday together. Meanwhile, Matty is hesitant to receive a colonoscopy due to a painful secret from his Vietnam days. However, he quickly realizes that having Blaire around makes him more comfortable. After the colonoscopy, Blaire pressures Matty to confess his secret, and he reveals to the family he was forced to masturbate a dog in Vietnam.
3	3	"Ejectile Dysfunction"	Seth MacFarlane	Dana Gould	January 11, 2024
John wishes to watch his first porno, but is too young to rent one. Ted is also barred since he has only been alive for eight years. Using fake IDs, the two rent several porno videos to watch at home while Susan and Matty are out on a date, but one of the VHS tapes gets stuck in the player. John and Ted sneak into the school building to swap out the AV room's VCR with their own, knowing it is an identical model, but are too late to stop Susan, who has returned home, from discovering the porn tape. Already upset at Matty for his dismissive attitude throughout their date, she assumes the porn is his and believes that he no longer finds her exciting, even going to confess to a priest. Blaire reassures her that this is not true and lies about the VHS being hers, much to the relief of John and Ted, who have run away from home in shame.
4	4	"Subways, Bicycles and Automobiles"	Seth MacFarlane	Jon Pollack	January 11, 2024
As payback for all the suffering she is forced to endure from him, Blaire forces Ted to be her designated driver on Halloween night, which gets in the way of his and John's plans to throw eggs at trick-or-treaters. Ted ends up getting drunk at the party and crashes Blaire's car, with their quest home only being prolonged as they suffer multiple, progressively weirder, setbacks. Meanwhile, John is bored at home waiting for Ted, who promised to be home by 9:00. Susan attempts to remedy this by calling over her friend's eccentric, thirty-eight-year-old son to keep him company. John is unamused by this, but does learn a valuable lesson in seizing every moment of his life. At the end of the episode, John is shocked when Susan's friend's real son arrives.
5	5	"Desperately Seeking Susan"	Seth MacFarlane	Seth MacFarlane	January 11, 2024
Blaire believes that Matty and Susan's marriage is unhealthy, given the latter's propensity to let everyone walk all over her, and insists that they undergo marriage counseling. After Matty walks out on a professional counselor, Ted is asked to help instead. While the couple opens up, Susan reveals that she almost became a teacher before settling down with Matty, something Blaire implores her to give another shot. After John and Ted's teacher, Mr. George, is fired for yelling at his genitals in the faculty lounge, Susan is hired to fill in for him. Despite a mostly successful first day, she ultimately decides to remain a housewife, as she is plenty satisfied with what she already has.
6	6	"Loud Night"	Seth MacFarlane	Julius Sharpe	January 11, 2024
As Christmas approaches, Blaire's friend, Sarah, decides to stay with the Bennetts due to a canceled flight. Matty draws the family's ire after choosing to watch the football game over Susan's choir solo at church, as well as insulting John's masculinity and making insensitive remarks about Sarah. Feeling blown off, he makes a wish on a shooting star much like John did in the past, granting sentience to his childhood toy truck, Dennis, who is even more conservative than he is. Both of their beliefs are challenged when Blaire comes out as sexually fluid and reveals that she and Sarah are a couple. The two almost leave before Matty decides to put his family's happiness first and admits that his beliefs were brought on by his upbringing. Dennis admits that he is gay as well and was projecting this whole time. After everyone reconciles, he drives away to Provincetown to pursue his new life.
7	7	"He's Gotta Have It"	Seth MacFarlane	Paul Corrigan & Brad Walsh	January 11, 2024
Following the introduction of sex ed in his class, John realizes that he may be the only remaining virgin in the student body. He and Ted try to prepare him for sex above all else, and soon enough, John forms a connection with his classmate, Bethany. However, Ted insists that she won't want to sleep with him if she thinks he is inexperienced, so the two lie about him being a ladies' man with a high body count. Right before John and Bethany can attend the Junior Prom, Bethany decides to break up, not wanting to just be a notch on his belt. After getting arrested and then blowing up at Ted, John goes to the prom separately from him and reveals his secret to the student body, winning Bethany back. The two prepare to have sex at her place, but are interrupted by the news of O. J. Simpson fleeing the cops, news that upsets Bethany and leaves John frustrated, due to now being denied sex. The episode ends with John and Ted coming up with the "Thunder Buddies" song from the first Ted film.

=== Season 2 (2026) ===
No. overall	No. in season	Title	Directed by	Written by	Original release date
8	1	"Talk Dirty to Me"	Seth MacFarlane	Aaron Lee	March 5, 2026
John and Ted get the idea to call a phone sex line after seeing an ad on TV. They use the school's basement phone to do so, and quickly become addicted. Eventually, they rack up a $5,000 phone bill which draws attention from Mr. Lawrence, chairman of the education board. When he suspects that John and Ted are the culprits, they make up a delinquent student named Jeremy to take the fall for them. Despite Mr. Lawrence's skepticism, he is convinced after seeing Jeremy (John in disguise) perform a motocross stunt on the school grounds, and vows to hunt him down and kill him even if it takes the rest of his life. Meanwhile, Matty invites Uncle Bernie over despite Blaire's refusal to reconnect with him. Bernie repeatedly bullies Matty, and his attempts to convince Blaire to move back in with him fail when he lets it slip that he's doing it to win back his wife. When he attempts to speak for her, saying that she agreed to move back in, Blaire throws a casserole at him to drive him away. Matty admits he's grateful for what she did, and Blaire admits she's glad she lives in his house.
9	2	"Mrs. Robicheck"	Seth MacFarlane	Dana Gould	March 5, 2026
Matty brings John and Ted to help him install an electric fence at a rich lawyer's home. The latter two are smitten with his neglected wife, Charlotte, who later calls Ted back to have sex. The two keep seeing each other until David returns home, immediately suspecting an affair. He manages to spot Matty's license plate as Ted and John make their getaway, suspecting Matty to be the one satisfying his wife. Meanwhile, Matty struggles with erectile dysfunction due to envy over the Robichecks' septic tank. Susan attempts to remedy this by borrowing a Cosmopolitan magazine from a friend and reading through a list of kinks. Hoping to better his marriage, David assumes Matty is amazing in bed and pays him $5,000 to let him watch while he has sex with Susan, only to walk away dumbfounded when they don't do anything unusual. As Matty gets his groove back due to the praise he got, Ted is heartbroken when he confesses his love to Charlotte, only to learn that she's willing to give David another chance.
10	3	"Dungeons & Dealers"	Seth MacFarlane	Chelsea Davison	March 5, 2026
Having run out of weed, Blaire asks to borrow some from John and Ted to help her study for finals, but their stash has also run dry. John gets the idea to ask his classmate, Chris, for some, but Chris refuses unless the three are able to win a quest in Dungeons & Dragons. After reading a story about some teenagers who vandalized a church, Susan insists on being there for her son and forces herself and Matty to join the quest too. The group obtains a map to the temple and braves several traps, before confronting the demon guarding the treasure. Everyone else dies trying to fight him, but Susan manages to touch his heart by talking to him, causing him to relinquish his treasure, unaware that the whole quest was a ploy to get pot. The music for this episode was composed by Joel McNeely instead of Walter Murphy.
11	4	"The Mom's Bombed Rom-Com"	Seth MacFarlane	Seth MacFarlane & Julius Sharpe	March 5, 2026
Ted infiltrates Blaire's birthday party to smuggle beer for himself and John, but witnesses a falling out between Blaire and Sarah. He and Blaire get drunk and make out, prompting Sarah to break up with her when she finds out the next day. At the same time, when John confronts him about not grabbing the beer, Ted lies about sleeping with Gert Fetchko and sets up a double date between them and her friend, Mildred. After receiving too many compliments about her jewelry, the latter suspects John and Ted to be con artists and convinces Fetchko to ditch them at the restaurant. Meanwhile, Susan becomes despondent at Matty's distant attitude and takes up drinking wine. Weirded out by her drunken antics, Matty flees downstairs and sees a depressed Blaire bingeing rom-coms, slowly becoming hooked on the genre himself. Blaire explains that there's no shame in showing vulnerability, prompting him to make a grand romantic gesture towards Susan, only to get severely injured in the process.
12	5	"The Sword in the Stoned"	Seth MacFarlane	Julius Sharpe	March 5, 2026
Knowing colleges are looking for extracurriculars, John and Ted auditon for the school's production of Camelot, but are cast as guards with no lines. Nonetheless, John manages to hit it off with Erin, the popular leading lady, as they bond over acting. The two are excited for the play and plan to hang out afterward, but John becomes nervous when Susan tells him how many people will be watching. Blaire gives him and Ted some pot brownies, unaware that they'll induce a panic attack until it's too late. John and Ted sabotage the play as a result, angering Erin, but are nonetheless able to add it to their extracurriculars. Meanwhile, Matty applies for a job at Dunkin' Donuts to earn extra money, with Susan joining him after he complains about the small paycheck. Soon after they're hired, Matty is excited to learn that Bill Clinton is visiting the shop soon, planning to roast him over his policies, only to get cold feet once the moment arrives. Clinton intimidates Matty in private before leaving, though Matty lies and says he came out on top.
13	6	"Roe v. Weed"	Seth MacFarlane	Chelsea Davison	March 5, 2026
After vomiting on Matty during an argument, Blaire discovers she is pregnant and decides to have an abortion, despite the blowback from her uncle and aunt. When she lets it slip that the conception resulted from a one-night stand with the RA, Matty finds Nimeet, who he thinks is the father, and brings him home to talk Blaire out of it, which fails. Despite his assumption being proven wrong, the two bond over their shared politics. John and Ted cover half the cost of the abortion by robbing the school's new vending machine, while Susan struggles to process Blaire's decision. After John and Ted distract the protestors outside the clinic, getting severely beaten up in the process, Blaire ultimately has the abortion as Susan decides to forgive her.
14	7	"Susan Is the New Black"	Seth MacFarlane	Kirker Butler	March 5, 2026
After Susan gets pulled over, the cop discovers the weed John and Ted had purchased and Susan takes the blame, leading to her arrest. Despite John admitting the weed was his, and despite Blaire and Matty ordering him to confess, Susan insists on taking the fall for him to protect his future and is sentenced to ten days. As punishment, John and Ted are forced to do all of Susan's daily house duties but struggle at it, making a complete mess of the house. In prison, Susan is initially disliked, but manages to win over her fellow inmates with her kindness, preparing better mess hall food, teaching literacy, and ordering Easter baskets for everyone. By the time she gets home, she finds the house clean thanks to Blaire's assistance, and lets John know that she'll always be there for him.
15	8	"Fraudcast News"	Seth MacFarlane	Paul Corrigan & Brad Walsh	March 5, 2026
Four months after finishing high school, John fails to do anything with his life. Matty angrily calls him out on his laziness, but suffers a heart attack and is ordered to stay calm for a week while recovering from his artery stents. When the O.J. Simpson verdict is decided, a guilt-ridden John is worried that Matty will die of another heart attack and decides to block him from seeing the actual news with the help of Ted and Blaire. After cutting the house's cable, they print a fake newspaper and rehire Bert to film fake news broadcasts to cushion Matty's worldview. Upon recovering, Matty goes outside and is ridiculed for defending the fake verdict and believing in the fake stories. Tired of lying, Blaire hands Matty the real paper, resulting in another heart attack. John apologizes for making Matty angry in the first place, but Matty reveals he's impressed by the amount of effort he put into his deception and tells him he can do whatever he sets his mind to. In the end, John decides to hit the gym and become incredibly buff.

== Production ==
It was announced in June 2021 that Peacock had given a straight-to-series order for a prequel series to the 2012 film. MacFarlane originally asked Mark Wahlberg to reprise his role as John, but due to being too occupied on other projects, the show became a prequel to the film series. In addition to serving as executive producer for the series, Seth MacFarlane reprises his role as the titular character Ted. Due to the prequel nature of the series, film stars Mark Wahlberg, Mila Kunis, and Amanda Seyfried do not reprise their roles. In April 2022, Scott Grimes, Max Burkholder, and Giorgia Whigham joined the cast. In May 2022, Alanna Ubach rounded out the cast of the series.

MacFarlane stated that he was offered a chance to make a Ted television series by Universal, following the success of the films, and agreed to do it so long as the CGI on Ted was not "nickel-and-dimed." He ultimately decided on a prequel as opposed to a continuation from where Ted 2 left off, citing the greater story potential and Wahlberg's busy schedule. MacFarlane also noted the appeal of doing a streaming show in which the main character is CGI, something he had not really seen before. The main cast members were each given a Ted teddy bear so they could practice the sight-line - looking down at nothing during filming.

Filming began in August 2022 at the Universal Studios Lot. The show was produced with ViewScreen, a new program developed at Fuzzy Door Productions that allowed special effects to be viewed in real-time while filming instead of waiting to add them in post. The first season of the series consists of seven episodes. In November, Seth MacFarlane confirmed that filming had wrapped.

In May 2024, the series was renewed for a second season. In August 2024, it was reported by Puck that the second season was nearly cancelled due to high production costs around $8 million per episode, with Universal opting to continue the franchise with an animated series in addition. In January 2025, MacFarlane confirmed that the filming for the second season had wrapped.

== Release ==
Ted was first premiered on January 10, 2024, at the AMC Cinema at The Grove in Los Angeles. The seven-episode first season was released on January 11, 2024 on Peacock. Within the first three days after its premiere, the series became the most-watched original title on Peacock. The eight-episode second season premiered on March 5, 2026. As of April 23, 2026, the second season received over 1.2 billion watch minutes on Peacock since its release, making it the top-watched scripted comedy series among all streaming services in that timeframe.

=== Home media ===
Universal released Ted: Season One on Blu-ray and DVD on September 10, 2024. Ted: Season Two and Ted: The Complete TV Series will be released on November 24, 2026.

== Reception ==
=== Season 1 ===
On the review aggregator website Rotten Tomatoes, 73% of 41 critics' reviews are positive for the first season, with an average rating of 6.8/10. The website's critics consensus reads: "The silly old bear isn't quite up to new tricks with this foul-mouthed sitcom, but fans of Seth MacFarlane's caustic comedy will get plenty of kick out of Ted's latest antics." Metacritic, which uses a weighted average, assigned a score of 51 out of 100 based on 18 critics, indicating "mixed or average reviews".

Nick Schager of The Daily Beast gave the season a positive review, praising its humor and handling of political themes, even stating that the series "earns quite a few more chuckles than its big-screen counterparts." Chris Vognar of Rolling Stone was similarly optimistic, describing the show as "silly" and "juvenile" but full of laughs nonetheless. Neal Justin of Star Tribune described Ted as "actually kind of sweet––and noble", praising its comedy and heart.

Variety's Alison Herman was far more critical, describing the franchise as "not the kind of story that requires expansion" and criticizing the show's similarity to the movies and lack of identity. She also criticized the series' 40-minute runtime and low episode count, describing seven episodes as "when an actual network sitcom would just be getting started." Angie Han of The Hollywood Reporter gave the show a mixed review, praising the casting of Ubach and the chemistry between MacFarlane and Burkholder, but criticized the episodes' length and pacing. She stated that "for every element that clicks, there are a half dozen more that don't" and suggested that Seth MacFarlane might be getting in his own way. Anita Singh of The Daily Telegraph awarded the series one star out of five, writing "MacFarlane's sweary Paddington has one joke… and it isn't big, it isn't clever and it's certainly not funny."

=== Season 2 ===
On Rotten Tomatoes, all 14 critics who reviewed the season gave it a positive review, resulting in a 100% rating. Metacritic states that the season has a "generally favorable" reception based on a weighted average score of 68 out of 100 from 4 critics.

== Future ==
In March of 2026, MacFarlane confirmed in an interview with TheWrap that there were no current plans for a third season, citing the show's high production costs due to the CGI needed for the titular character. A month later, Seth MacFarlane continued to express interest in producing a third season, as well as a possible film on Peacock featuring the cast of the series.
