= Julius Sharpe =

American television writer and producer

- Education: Columbia University (BA)
- Occupations: Television writer, producer
- Notable work: Making History and United We Fall

Jonathan Goldblatt, who writes under the pen name Julius Sharpe, is an American television writer, producer and showrunner of Making History and United We Fall.

== Biography ==
Sharpe received his B.A. from Columbia University in 1995. He started his TV writing career as a writer for The Late Late Show with Craig Kilborn and The Late Late Show with Craig Ferguson. He was also a writer for Comedy Central's Weekends at the DL and The Showbiz Show with David Spade.

In 2014, Sharpe signed an overall deal with 20th Century FOX Television, where he created and executive produced the comedy series Making History. He was also co-executive producer of The Grinder and worked as a writer, producer, and voice actor for Seth MacFarlane's Family Guy, The Cleveland Show and co-executive produced the live-action Cristela and Dads.

In 2017, Sharpe signed a two-year overall deal at Sony Television. He created and produced the 2020 television series United We Fall. In 2017, he was reported to be executive producing a television adaptation of the movie Stripes.

In 2024, he was a writer, co-executive producer, and actor on MacFarlane's Ted.

== Personal life ==
Sharpe is married to actress and producer Stephanie Escajeda. The series United We Fall was based on the real-life relationship between Sharpe and Escajeda.
