= ViewScreen =

Texas Instruments graphing calculator accessory

- A ViewScreen panel with accessories
- Introduced: 1993
- Connection: Serial cable
- Color: No

A ViewScreen is a type of LCD display panel and projection system produced by Texas Instruments. It mirrors the screen of compatible graphing calculators.

== History ==
The ViewScreen was first introduced in 1993.

== Variants ==
There are several ViewScreen models:

- ViewScreen (original)
- ViewScreen 82
- ViewScreen 85
- ViewScreen 92
- ViewScreen 92 Plus
- TI-Nspire ViewScreen Panel
