= Alanna Ubach =

American actress (born 1975)

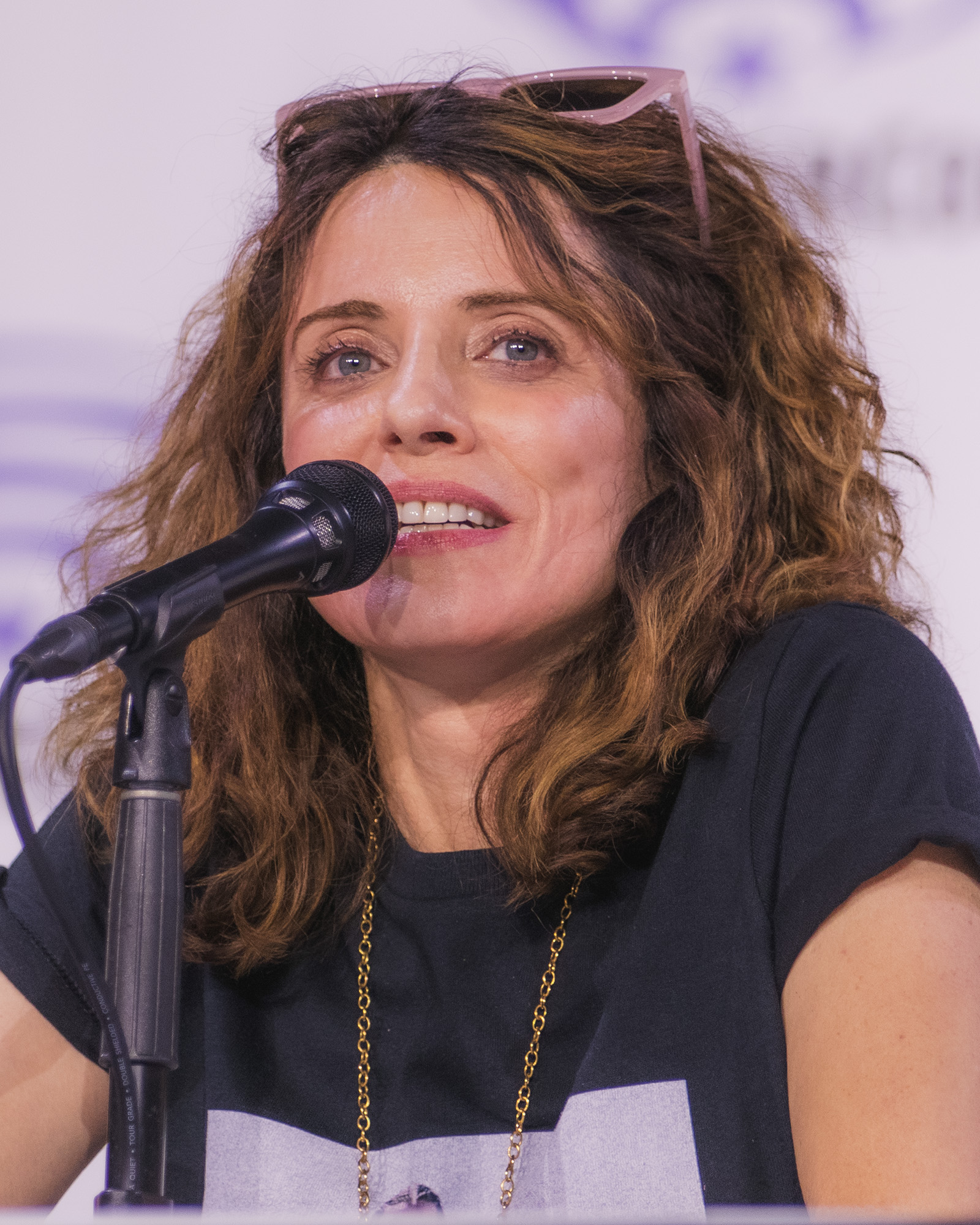
- Ubach in 2026
- Born: Alanna González Ubach; October 3, 1975 (age 51); Downey, California, U.S.
- Occupation: Actress
- Years active: 1990–present
- Spouse: Thom Russo (m. 2014)
- Children: 1

Alanna González Ubach (born October 3, 1975) is an American actress. She is known for her roles in films such as Legally Blonde (2001), Meet the Fockers (2004), and Waiting... (2005), and in television series such as Girlfriends' Guide to Divorce (2015-2018), Euphoria (2019–2026), Ted (2024–2026), and The Last of Us (2025). She was also in an episode of Always Sunny in Philadelphia (2011). She has also performed voices in numerous animated series such as El Tigre: The Adventures of Manny Rivera, The Spectacular Spider-Man, and Pound Puppies and films such as Rango (2011) and Coco (2017).

== Early life ==
Ubach was born on October 3, 1975, in Downey, California, the daughter of Sidna (née González) and Rodolfo Ubach. Her father was from San Juan, Puerto Rico, and her mother was from Sinaloa, Mexico. Her paternal grandfather was Spanish from Málaga, Spain.

== Career ==
=== Film and television ===
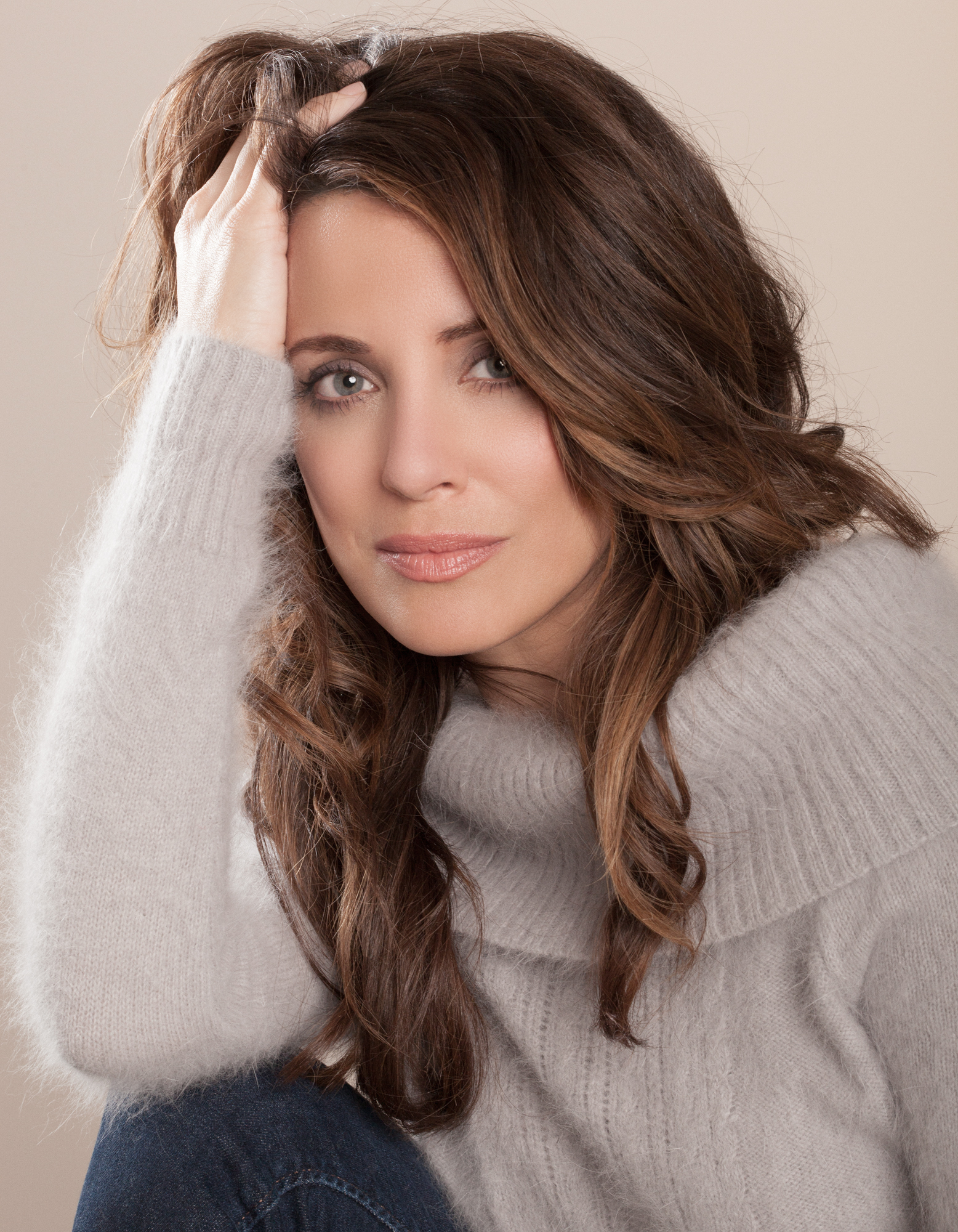
Ubach in 2019

In 1994, she received a positive review from The New York Times for her role as a Jewish girl in Kindertransport at the Manhattan Theatre Club. During this stage, she also landed a regular spot as Josie the assistant in the TV series Beakman's World. Her early film roles included Airborne (1993), Sister Act 2: Back in the Habit (1993), Renaissance Man (1994), and The Brady Bunch Movie (1995). She later had roles in a series of indie films: Denise Calls Up (1995), in which she played the title character; Johns (1996), playing David Arquette's girlfriend, and Freeway (1996) with Reese Witherspoon and Kiefer Sutherland, playing a Latina gang girl. She also played roles in more mainstream films like Clockwatchers (1997) and alongside Witherspoon in the two Legally Blonde films.

In 2004, Ubach starred in the film Waiting..., alongside Ryan Reynolds and Anna Faris, and landed the role of a Latina caterer in Meet the Fockers (2004). She also had recurring roles on Hung (2009) and Californication (2013).

Ubach starred with Lisa Edelstein as a regular cast member on Bravo's first scripted series, Girlfriends' Guide to Divorce. Ubach portrayed Jo, who moved to Los Angeles to reinvent herself in the guest house of her newly divorced best friend from college, Abby. Ubach described the show as "fun and stylish, it's very relatable". The role of Jo was created following the exit of Janeane Garofalo.

Ubach's later television roles include Suze Howard on Euphoria, Tessa Flores on Guilty Party, and Carol Atkinson on The Flight Attendant.

In 2024, Ubach starred in the lead role of Susan Bennett on the Peacock series Ted, the television adaptation of the hit film.

In 2025, Ubach guest-starred as Hanrahan in the second season of the HBO series The Last of Us.

=== Theater ===
In June 2008, Ubach starred in and narrated her ongoing one-woman show, Patriotic Bitch, which ran at the Clurman Theatre in Theater Row. Reviewing Patriotic Bitch, The New York Times described it as an "entertaining one-act series of character monologues" and noted that Ubach is "seriously talented".

== Personal life ==
Ubach married record producer Thom Russo in 2014. Their son was born on July 25, 2017. In 2024, Ubach was in the process of gaining Spanish citizenship through her grandfather.

== Filmography ==
=== Film ===
Year	Title	Role	Notes
1993	Airborne	Gloria	
1993	Sister Act 2: Back in the Habit	Maria	
1994	Hits!	Angie	
1994	Renaissance Man	Emily Rago	
1995	The Brady Bunch Movie	Noreen	
1995	Denise Calls Up	Denise Devaro	
1995	Virtuosity	Eila	
1996	Layin' Low	Manuela	
1996	Freeway	Mesquita	
1996	Love Is All There Is	Niccolina	
1996	Just Your Luck	Angela	Direct-to-DVD
1996	Johns	Nikki	
1997	Pink as the Day She Was Born	Cherry	
1997	Clockwatchers	Jane	
1997	Trading Favors	Christy	
1998	Enough Already	Val	
1998	All of It	Amy Holbeck	
1999	The Sterling Chase	Jenna Marino	
1999	The Big Day	Connie	
2000	Slice & Dice	Ginger	
2000	Shriek If You Know What I Did Last Friday the 13th	Ms. Grossberg	
2000	Blue Moon	Peggy	
2001	Legally Blonde	Serena McGuire	
2002	The Perfect You	Wendy	
2003	Legally Blonde 2: Red, White & Blonde	Serena McGuire	
2003	Wasabi Tuna	Emme	
2003	Nobody Knows Anything!	Sarah	
2004	Meet the Fockers	Isabel Villalobos	
2005	Herbie: Fully Loaded	Reporter	Uncredited
2005	Waiting...	Naomi	
2006	Open Window	Kim	
2006	Hard Scrambled	Crysta	
2007	Equal Opportunity	Peggy M. Smith	
2007	Jekyll	Michelle Utterson	
2007	The Pre Nup	Cindy	Short film
2007	Shrinks	Dr. Jameson	Short film
2008	Batman: Gotham Knight	Dander (voice)	Direct-to-DVD; segment: "Have I Got a Story for You"
2009	Stuntmen	Tovah Frieberg	
2009	Still Waiting...	Naomi	Direct-to-DVD
2010	A Reuben by Any Other Name	Elizabeth	Short film
2010	Darnell Dawkins: Mouth Guitar Legend	Grace Slick	
2010	Screwball: The Ted Whitfield Story	Kristy Kittens	
2011	Bad Teacher	Angela	
2011	Rango	Boo, Cletus, Fresca, Miss Daisy (voice)	
2011	Losing Control	Alora	
2011	Poolboy: Drowning Out the Fury	Karen	
2012	Envelope	Tanya Petrovna	Short film
2012	Garbage	Casey Siegel	
2012	Should've Been Romeo	Pilar	
2013	A Haunted House	Jenny	
2013	Being Us	Margaret	
2013	I Know That Voice	Herself	Documentary
2015	Helen Keller vs. Nightwolves	Anne Sullivan	
2016	Quackerz	Ms. Knout (voice)	
2017	To the Bone	Karen	
2017	Coco	Mamá Imelda (voice)	
2017	The Last Word	Gynecologist	
2017	August Falls	Detective Down	
2018	Gloria Bell	Veronica	
2019	Bombshell	Jeanine Pirro	
2019	Wyrm	Penelope	
2023	Fool's Paradise	Pornography Actress	
2024	In Our Blood	Sam Wyland	
2024	Venom: The Last Dance	Nova Moon	

=== Television ===
Year	Title	Role	Notes
1992	The Torkelsons	Willie	Episode: "It's My Party"
1992–93	Beakman's World	Josie	Main role (season 1)
1993	Moment of Truth: Why My Daughter?	April	Television film
1993	L.A. Law	Christine Rowan	Episode: "Bourbon Cowboy"
1994	ABC Afterschool Specials	Cindy	Episode: "Boys Will Be Boys"
1994	Diagnosis: Murder	Melissa Ridgeway	Episode: "Guardian Angel"
1995	ER	Terry's friend	Episode: "Long Day's Journey"
1995; 1998	Touched by an Angel	Lydia Evans, Cookie	2 episodes
1996	Seduced by Madness: The Diane Borchardt Story	Shannon Johnson	Miniseries
1996	Party of Five	Gina	2 episodes
1997	Apt. 2F	Alanna	2 episodes
1998	Tracey Takes On...	Actress	Episode: "Smoking"
1999	Providence	Darla Owens	Episode: "Sisters"
1999	Chicago Hope	Natalie Kramer	Episode: "Big Hand for the Little Lady"
2000	Sports Night	Catherine Brenner	Episode: "Bells and a Siren"
2000–01	The Huntress	Robin Ripley	3 episodes
2001	Tikiville	Herself	Television film
2001	Gary & Mike	Ensemble (voice)	4 episodes
2001	Two Guys, a Girl and a Pizza Place	'Chivalry' Nurse	Episode: "A Few Good Firemen"
2001	The Division	Rita	Episode: "The First Hit's Free, Baby"
2002	The West Wing	Celia Walton	Episode: "Night Five"
2002	John Doe	Dionne Walker	Episode: "Mind Games"
2002–03	Teamo Supremo	Hector Felipé Corrio, Skate Lad, Brenda / Rope Girl (voice)	Main role
2002–04	Ozzy & Drix	Mayor Paul Spryman, Hector's Mom (voice)	Recurring role
2004	30 Days Until I'm Famous	Daisy Fresh	Television film
2004	Karroll's Christmas	Jodie McDougall	Television film
2004	Monk	Jennie Silverman	Episode: "Mr. Monk and the Employee of the Month"
2004–06	Brandy & Mr. Whiskers	Lola Boa (voice)	Recurring role
2004; 2006	Higglytown Heroes	Plunkie (voice)	2 episodes
2005	The Closer	Sandy DeCourt	Episode: "Standards and Practices"
2005	House	Dr. Louise Harper	Episode: "Spin"
2005	Uncommon Sense	Brenda	Television film
2005	CSI: NY	Constance Briell	2 episodes
2007	Playing Chicken	Colette	Television film
2007	Friday Night Lights	Roberta "Bobbie" Roberts	2 episodes
2007	All Grown Up!	Java Lava Boy (voice)	Episode: "Petition This"
2007	Random! Cartoons	Roger Jones, Computer, Mrs. Abbott, Samantha (voice)	Episode: "The Infinite Goliath"
2007–08	El Tigre: The Adventures of Manny Rivera	Manny Rivera / El Tigre, additional voices	Main role
2008; 2009	Eli Stone	Cathy Bonilla	3 episodes
2008–09	The Spectacular Spider-Man	Liz Allan, Trina (voice)	Recurring role
2009–11	Hung	Yael Koontz	Recurring role (season 1–3)
2009–11	Men of a Certain Age	Michelle	Recurring role
2010	NUMB3RS	Paula Watson	Episode: "And the Winner Is..."
2010–13	Pound Puppies	Strudel, various voices	Main role
2011	It's Always Sunny in Philadelphia	Roxy	Episode: "Frank's Pretty Woman"
2011	The Mentalist	Dr. Gidry	Episode: "Bloodstream"
2011	Little in Common	Maya Pacheco	Television film
2012	Ringer	Ms. Deluca	Episode: "It's Easy to Cry When This Much Cash is Involved"
2012	Fairly Legal	Bonnie	Episode: "Ripple of Hope"
2012–13	Kaijudo	Master Tiera, Lucy, Portia (voice)	Recurring role
2012–14	See Dad Run	Amy Hobbs	Main role
2013	Californication	Trudy	3 episodes
2013	Mad	Annabel, Cat, Museum Daughter (voice)	Episode: "Papa/1600 Finn"
2013	Revolution	Bonnie Webster	Episode: "Dead Man Walking"
2013; 2014	Ben 10: Omniverse	Rook Shar, Rook Ben (voice)	3 episodes
2014	Stan Lee's Mighty 7	Reporter (voice)	Television film
2014	Things You Shouldn't Say Past Midnight	Grace	6 episodes
2014; 2015	NCIS	NSA Senior Intelligence Analyst Sofia Martinez	2 episodes
2014; 2017	Sheriff Callie's Wild West	Polly Mae Porcupine, Tia Tortuga, Grimy Grace (voice)	3 episodes
2015	Wallykazam!	Mrs. Trollman (voice)	Episode: "Mission for Mom"
2015–18	Girlfriends' Guide to Divorce	Jo Hernandez-Frumpkis	Main role
2016	American Horror Story	Jo	Episode: "Be Our Guest"
2016	TripTank	Tommy, Justin (voice)	2 episodes
2017	Hand of God	Tammy Murphy	4 episodes
2017–19	Welcome to the Wayne	Ansi Molina (voice)	Main role
2017–23	Puppy Dog Pals	Various voices (voice)	Recurring role
2018	Snowfall	Gabrielle Elias	3 episodes
2018	Dietland	Marlowe Buchanan	3 episodes
2018	The Good Cop	Debbi Paddock	Episode: "Will Big Tony Roll Over?"
2019	Veronica Mars	Silvia	Episode: "Spring Break Forever"
2019	A Million Little Things	Dawn	Episode: "Coming Home"
2019–2026	Euphoria	Suze Howard	Recurring role
2020	Kipo and the Age of Wonderbeasts	Wheels, Boom-Boom (voice)	4 episodes
2020	Gentefied	Vivian	Episode: "Delfina"
2020	Filthy Rich	Yopi Candalaria	9 episodes
2020–21	Crossing Swords	Queen Tulip (voice)	Main role
2020–25	Mythic Quest	Shannon	4 episodes
2021	Guilty Party	Tessa Flores	Main role
2021	Maya and the Three	Skull (voice)	2 episodes
2021–23	Harriet the Spy	Various voices (voice)	Recurring role
2021–24	Monsters at Work	Katherine "Cutter" Sterns, various characters (voice)	Main role
2022	The Ghost and Molly McGee	Sonia Davis, additional voices	3 episodes
2022	The Flight Attendant	Carol Atkinson	3 episodes
2023	The Legend of Vox Machina	Osysa (voice)	2 episodes
2023	Family Guy	Old Woman (voice)	Episode: "Old World Harm"
2023	American Dad!	Wraith, Janice, Tony Vengeance (voice)	3 episodes
2023–24	Moon Girl and Devil Dinosaur	Clueless Girl (voice)	4 episodes
2023–24	Princess Power	Miss Fussywiggles (voice)	Main role
2024	Lego Pixar: BrickToons	Mamá Imelda (voice)	Miniseries; Episode: "Family Bands Together"
2024–26	Ted	Susan Bennett	Main role
2024–25	Tales of the Teenage Mutant Ninja Turtles	Dr. Josefina Bishop (voice)	Recurring role
2024–present	Ariel	Cristina Cuttles (voice)	Recurring role
2025	The Last of Us	Hanrahan	2 episodes (season 2)
2026	Family Guy	Mrs. Perez (voice)	Episode: "Phony Montana"
2026	Hacks	Amanda Weinberg	Episode: Number One Fan
2026	Law & Order	Defense Attorney Abigail Donahue	Episode: "Ride or Die"
2026	Lucky	Sylvia	Episode: "Make 'em Dance"
2026	President Curtis	Janice, Additional voices	Recurring role
2026	Ted: The Animated Series	Susan Bennett (voice)	

=== Video games ===
Year	Title	Role	Notes
2007	Nicktoons: Attack of the Toybots	El Tigre / Manny Rivera	Nintendo DS version only
2008	El Tigre: The Adventures of Manny Rivera	El Tigre / Manny Rivera	
2011	Rango	Cletus, Cletus's Mom	Credited as Alana Ubach
2012	Madagascar 3: The Video Game	Captain DuBois, Italian Citizens, New York Citizens	
2013	Marvel Heroes	Lady Deadpool	Uncredited
2013	Grand Theft Auto V	The Local Population	
2023	Nickelodeon All-Star Brawl 2	El Tigre / Manny Rivera	

== Accolades ==
Year	Award	Category	Work	Result
1992	Young Artist Awards	Performer in a Children's Program	Beakman's World	Nominated
2025	The Astra Awards	Best Guest Actress in a Drama Series	The Last of Us	Nominated
