= Max Burkholder =

American actor (born 1997)

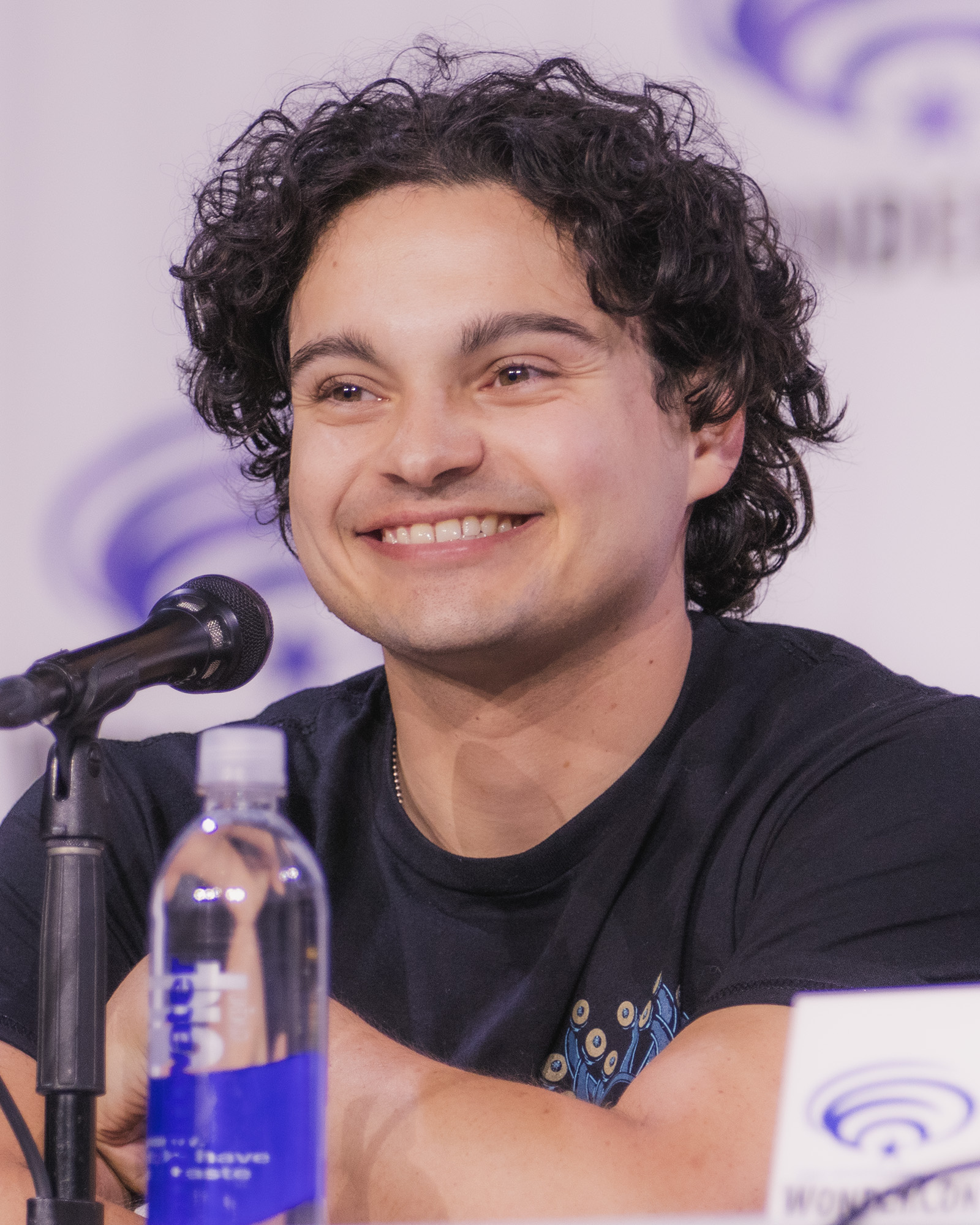
- Burkholder in 2026
- Born: Maxwell Henry Wolf Burkholder; November 1, 1997 (age 28); Los Angeles, California, U.S.
- Occupation: Actor
- Years active: 2002–present

Maxwell Henry Wolf Burkholder (born November 1, 1997) is an American actor. His roles on television include Max Braverman in the NBC comedy-drama series Parenthood (2010–2015), as well as young John Bennett in the Peacock fantasy comedy Ted (2024–2026), an entry in the Ted franchise. As a child, he began voice acting in roles such as Chomper in The Land Before Time, Roo on My Friends Tigger & Pooh (both 2007–2008), and World in the Foster's Home for Imaginary Friends television special Destination: Imagination (2008). He has also appeared in films such as The Purge (2013) and Benjamin (2018).

== Life and career ==
=== Early life and education ===
Burkholder was born in November 1997; his parents are former actors. Burkholder has a brother named James. He attended Campbell Hall School. Burkholder attended Harvard University as a member of the Class of 2021, studying biology, but dropped out after his freshman year to pursue acting full-time. Burkholder began his theatrical career at Harvard, appearing in a student production of columbinus at Harvard portraying Dylan Klebold/Loner. Burkholder is Jewish.

=== Television ===
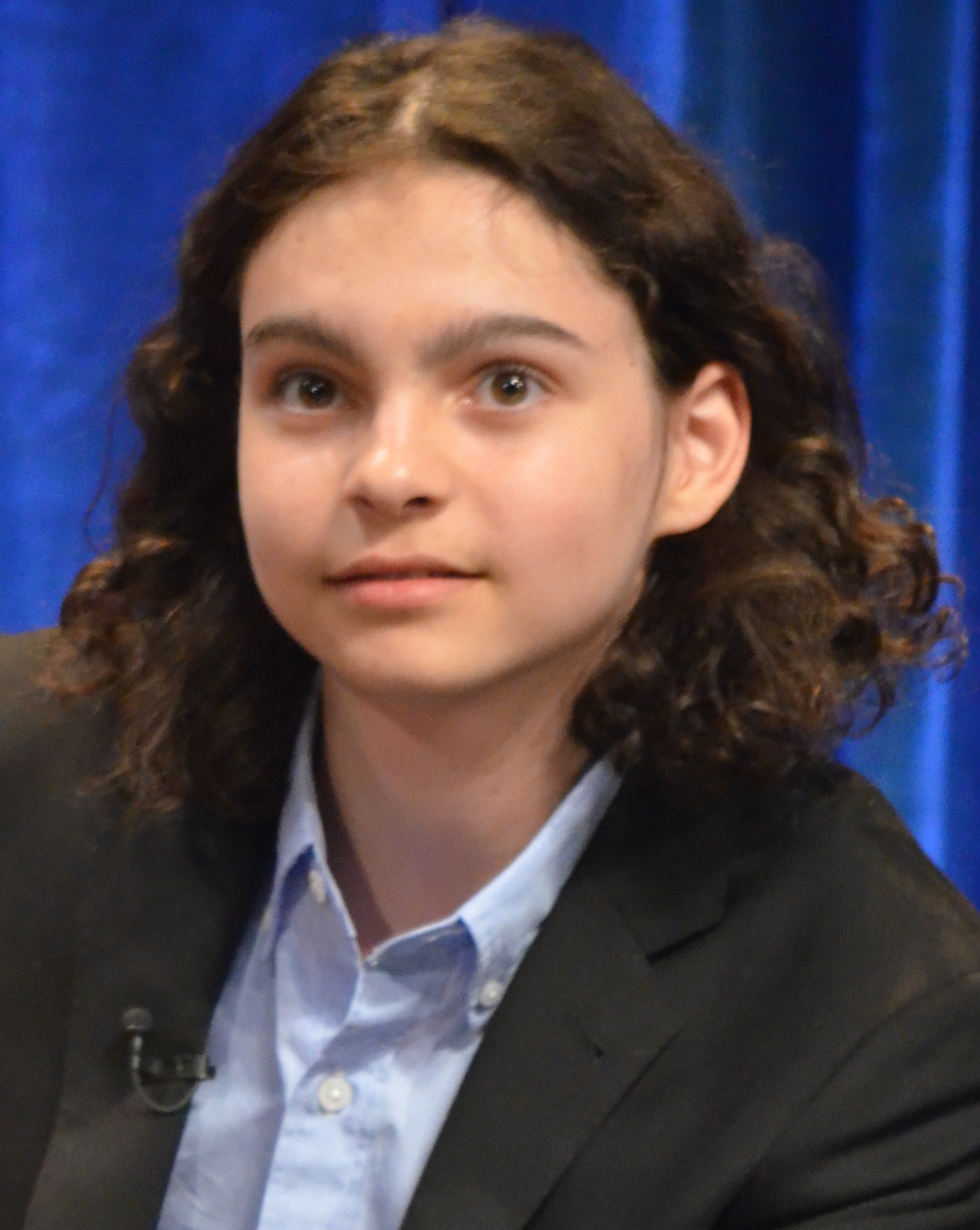
Burkholder at the March 2013 Paleyfest

Burkholder began voice acting in several television series as a child. He voiced Chomper in the television series The Land Before Time, based on the film series of the same name. He also provided the voice of Roo on My Friends Tigger & Pooh (taking over the role from Jimmy Bennett), and played World, an imaginary friend inside a toybox in Destination: Imagination, a television special episode of Foster's Home for Imaginary Friends (2008). He was the voice of Samsquatch in Random! Cartoons. He has also voiced various characters in the animated sitcoms Family Guy, The Cleveland Show and American Dad!, all of which were created by Seth MacFarlane, whom Burkholder later worked with on Ted.

In live-action television roles, Burkholder appeared on Parenthood as Max Braverman; executive producer Jason Katims said that consultant Wayne Tashjian, a behavioral psychologist, looked at the script and met with Burkholder and his mother about the scenes involving the character of Max. Burkholder and his mother then practiced the scenes by themselves. For special scenes, the show employed a second consultant to ensure accuracy. Burkholder also appeared as young Mitch on Crumbs. He guest starred on an episode of CSI: Miami, "Death Pool 100" and in an episode of CSI: NY. In addition, he played Billy in one episode of The Suite Life of Zack & Cody on Disney Channel. He also appeared in the television series In Treatment and Love for Rent, and played the role of Duncan in an episode of Grey's Anatomy, "Brave New World". He also played a child at an airport in an episode of The O.C..

Burkholder starred in the TV series Ted, as the younger version of Mark Wahlberg's character John Bennett from the previous films in the Ted franchise. The series premiered in 2024 and Burkholder continued in his starring role into the series' second season in 2026. In 2025, Burkholder was a guest performer on the second season of the panel show Smartypants, streaming on Dropout.

=== Film ===
Burkholder's first acting role overall was in the 2003 comedy film Daddy Day Care as Max. He also appeared in Friends with Money, released in 2006. He played Charlie, the son of character James Sandin (played by Ethan Hawke), in the horror film The Purge, released in the summer of 2013. Burkholder portrayed the title character in the 2018 black comedy film Benjamin, directed by and starring Bob Saget.

== Filmography ==
=== Film roles ===
Year	Title	Role	Notes
2003	Daddy Day Care	Max Ryerson	
2005	Love for Rent	Max	
2006	Friends with Money	Max	
2006	The Ant Bully	Blue Teammate #6 (voice)	
2006	Arthur's Missing Pal	Timmy Tibble (voice)	
2007	My Friends Tigger & Pooh: Super Sleuth Christmas Movie	Roo (voice)	Direct to video
2008	The Journal	10 Year Old Alex	Short
2008	Fly Me to the Moon	Mother's Maggot (voice)	
2009	My Friends Tigger & Pooh: Tigger & Pooh And A Musical Too	Roo (voice)	Direct to video
2009	Astro Boy	Billy (voice)	
2010	The Rainbow Tribe	Boo	
2013	The Purge	Charlie Sandin	
2018	The First Purge	Charlie Sandin (flashbacks)	
2018	Benjamin	Benjamin	
2019	Imaginary Order	Xander	

=== Television roles ===
Year	Title	Role	Notes
2004	Commando Nanny	Seth Winter	Unaired Pilot
2005	The O.C.	Kid in Airport	Episode: "The Rainy Day Women"
2005	Fathers and Sons	Nick at 5	Television film
2005–2017	Family Guy	Kid, Young Patrick Pewterschmidt, Calvin, Will Robinson, Scotty, various characters (voices)	21 episodes
2006	Crumbs	Young Mitch Crumb	2 episodes
2006	CSI: NY	Sam	Episode: "Necrophilia Americana"
2006	The Suite Life of Zack & Cody	Billy	Episode: "Books and Birdhouses"
2006	CSI: Miami	Tyler Lamar	Episode: "Death Pool 100"
2007	Random! Cartoons	Samsquatch (voice)	Episode: "Samsquatch"
2007	Lipshitz Saves the World	Young Adam Lipshitz	
2007	Panic Button	Sam Alden	Television film originally released as Point of Entry
2007–2008	The Land Before Time	Chomper (voice)	26 episodes
2007–2008	My Friends Tigger & Pooh	Roo (voice)	25 episodes
2007–2008	Brothers & Sisters	Jack McCallister	4 episodes
2007–2016	American Dad!	Kid Doctor, Little Boy, Justin Bieber (voices)	3 episodes
2008	The Spectacular Spider-Man	Billy Connors (voice)	Episode: "Natural Selection"
2008	Grey's Anatomy	Duncan Pailey	Episode: "Brave New World"
2008	Foster's Home for Imaginary Friends: Destination Imagination	World (voice)	Television film
2008–2009	In Treatment	Max Weston	2 episodes
2009	Private Practice	Ben King	2 episodes
2009	The Cleveland Show	Kid (voice)	Episode: "The One About Friends"
2009	Children of the Corn	Additional voices	Television film
2010–2015	Parenthood	Max Braverman	Main role
2017	The Orville	Tomilin	Episode: "If the Stars Should Appear"
2021–present	Invincible	Matt (voice)	2 episodes
2024–2026	Ted	John Bennett	Main role
2025	Smartypants	Himself	Episode: "Outer Space, Child Labor, The Alphabet"

== Awards and nominations ==
Award	Year	Category	Result	Work
Young Artist Award	2012	Best Performance in a Television Series – Supporting Young Actor	Nominated	Parenthood
Young Artist Award	2014	Best Performance in a Television Series – Supporting Young Actor	Won	Parenthood
