= MRC (company) =

American film and television production company

MRC II Distribution Company, L.P.
- Trade name: MRC
- Formerly: Media Rights Capital (2004–2013)
- Type: Limited partnership
- Industry: Film; Television
- Founded: 2004; 22 years ago
- Founders: Modi Wiczyk; Asif Satchu
- Headquarters: 750 N. San Vicente Blvd., West Hollywood, California 90069, U.S.
- Area served: Worldwide
- Key people: Modi Wiczyk (co-chairman); Asif Satchu (co-chairman); Scott Tenley (CEO)
- Website: www.mrcentertainment.com

MRC II Distribution Company, L.P., doing business as MRC (formerly Media Rights Capital), is an American film and television studio founded by Modi Wiczyk and Asif Satchu in 2004. Based in West Hollywood, California, MRC develops, finances, and produces films and television shows in partnership with the industry's leading creative artists.

The original business plan, called Another New Ballgame, was written in 1999 as part of a class assignment while Wiczyk and Satchu attended Harvard Business School. The plan quickly gained notoriety throughout Hollywood and was deemed controversial for predicting the decline of the traditional "Hollywood system" alongside the emergence of a new order driven by internet-based distribution and independent studios fueled by talent agencies.

MRC is famous for many firsts in Hollywood. It was the first studio to establish a deeply-integrated partnership with major talent agency, Endeavor Talent Agency, which would become a model for future alliances between agencies and studios. Their deals for Alejandro González Iñárritu's Babel (2006) and Sacha Baron Cohen's Brüno (2009), the follow-up to Borat (2006), were early examples of artists owning copyrights, selling films for significantly more than their cost, and having true control over production and marketing.

The company was an early innovator in the creator economy. It produced Seth MacFarlane's Cavalcade of Cartoon Comedy (2008) web series for YouTube, the platform's earliest Hollywood-backed scripted series. The show became YouTube's second-most-subscribed-to sponsor channel during its run and was notable for being the first show distributed exclusively online through Google's AdSense network, syndicating content across thousands of partner sites. The success of Cavalcade positioned MRC as one of the first studios to merge storytelling with tech-driven distribution.

MRC's Television division developed, produced, and financed House of Cards (2013), the first original series ordered directly by Netflix, launching the streaming era of prestige television. The series was the first streaming-exclusive drama to receive Emmy nominations and introduced the "binge" model of releasing all episode simultaneously.

Since then, MRC has developed a reputation for financing and producing critically acclaimed films and series while maintaining a philosophy centered on supporting artists and filmmakers. The company's continued success has been attributed to its ability to challenge traditional Hollywood conventions, to embrace emerging technologies and business models, and to maintain close partnerships with creative visionaries.

Film productions by MRC include Ted (2012), Baby Driver (2017), Knives Out (2019), American Fiction (2023), and Saltburn (2023). Representative co-financed films include 22 Jump Street (2014), Furious 7 (2015), the Hotel Transylvania sequels, and The SpongeBob Movie: Sponge on the Run (2020). MRC's television credits include House of Cards, Ozark, The Great, The Terminal List, Poker Face, and Ted. Upcoming productions include Ted: The Animated Series, and M.I.A..

MRC has collaborated with numerous prominent filmmakers, including Jason Bateman, Chloe Domont, Emerald Fennell, David Fincher, Ricky Gervais, Alejandro González Iñárritu, Rian Johnson, Seth MacFarlane, Walter Salles, and Edgar Wright.

To date, MRC's productions have been nominated for 120 Emmy Awards, 38 Golden Globe Awards, 17 Academy Awards, and 5 GRAMMY Awards. Its films have grossed over $6 billion worldwide at the box office.

== History ==
=== Early history ===
MRC was founded by Modi Wiczyk and Asif Satchu in 2004, and its early investors included Guggenheim Partners, AT&T, WPP Group, Goldman Sachs and ABRY Partners. The company was established as a financer-producer, packaging film projects for sale to film studios, and holding ownership stakes in the production.

In 2007, it funded filmmakers such as Robert Rodriguez, Ricky Gervais, Walter Salles, Ryan Murphy, Richard Kelly, Bennett Miller and Todd Field. The same year, it entered into an agreement with Warner Bros. Pictures to allow Warner to distribute three of the eight pictures over a $250 million feature production funding. MRC launched a television division of the studio in early 2008. In 2008, the company signed a deal with Blinding Edge Pictures to finance its films through its own banner, The Night Chronicles.

In 2008, The CW leased its Sunday-night schedule to MRC beginning in the 2008–09 television season. MRC scheduled the reality show In Harm's Way and the dramas Valentine and Easy Money. In November 2008, after all four shows drew poor viewership, The CW announced that it would withdraw from the agreement. The network returned the Sunday timeslots to its affiliates in the 2009–10 season.

In March 2010, it was reported that MRC had made an offer to acquire Focus Features from Universal Pictures, but that the deal had fallen through. In April of that year, MRC sold the upcoming Seth MacFarlane film Ted to Universal. Later in December, MRC would reach a distribution agreement with Universal, under which it would provide distribution and marketing services for up to 20 MRC films over the next five years. The agreement would give the option for Universal to invest in the films, but was not a first-look deal, and also gave MRC the option to pre-sell distribution rights in specific territories.

After acquiring rights to produce a U.S. remake of the BBC miniseries House of Cards, MRC would sell the series to the streaming service Netflix in 2011.

On February 1, 2018, Eldridge Industries, a holding company owned by former Guggenheim Partners president Todd Boehly, announced that it would contribute its media assets — including The Hollywood Reporter, Dick Clark Productions, and Billboard, and merge them with MRC into a new company known as Valence Media. In October 2018, MRC formed a joint venture with United Talent Agency known as Civic Center Media, which seeks to back projects involving its members via MRC.

=== 2019–2022: Valence Media and PMRC ===
In December 2019, Valence Media acquired Nielsen Holdings' music data business, with the division being rebranded as MRC Data.

In 2020, Valence Media rebranded as MRC.

On September 23, 2020, it was announced that Penske Media Corporation, owner of The Hollywood Reporter's main competitor Variety, would assume operations of the MRC Media & Info publications under a joint venture with MRC known as PMRC. In turn, MRC would form a second joint venture to develop content tied to PMRC publications.

In September 2021, former E! president Adam Stotsky became the new president of MRC Live & Alternative, replacing the outgoing Amy Thurlow. At this time, Dick Clark Productions was folded into MRC Live & Alternative and discontinued as a brand.

=== 2022–present: Unwinding of the Valence merger ===
In August 2022, Eldridge agreed with Wiczyk and Satchu to divide MRC's assets, effectively undoing the 2018 Valence Media merger. Eldridge re-acquired the company's live and alternative division (which reinstated the Dick Clark Productions banner), as well as MRC's share of the PMRC joint venture, Luminate (the former MRC Data), and investments in studios including A24 and Fulwell 73. The remaining MRC entity, in which Eldridge will retain a minority stake, will retain its scripted film and TV production entity as well as investments in Civic Center Media and T-Street Productions. Wiczyk and Satchu became chairmen of the company in 2023.

== SpinMedia ==
SpinMedia (formerly BuzzMedia) was an American digital publisher that owned a number of pop culture websites, including Spin, Stereogum, Vibe, and The Frisky. It was founded in 1999 by Anthony Batt, Marc Brown, Kevin Woolery, and Steve Haldane under the name Buzznet, and by 2006, Buzznet had a total of nine employees in the Los Angeles, California, area. The BuzzMedia name was created as the company started to acquire more pop-culture and music blogs.

The company acquired Spin Media, publisher of Spin magazine, in July 2012. After shutting down the print version of the magazine, reducing its staff to about 200, and focusing on advertising, it rebranded itself as SpinMedia in March 2013. At that time, Steve Hansen became its chief executive. In April 2013, it acquired Vibe magazine.

In 2014, M/C Partners became the primary owner of SpinMedia after an assignment for benefit of creditors. That year, BuzzMedia had also acquired music sites Property of Zack, AbsolutePunk.net, Under The Gun Review, and Punknews.org.

In September 2016, SpinMedia sold Buzznet, Idolator, and PureVolume to startup corporation Hive Media. In December of that year, Eldridge Industries acquired Spin, Vibe, Stereogum, and Death and Taxes via the Hollywood Reporter-Billboard Media Group for an undisclosed amount, making Billboard the world's largest music brand in terms of digital traffic and audience share. Celebuzz, The Frisky, and The Superficial were sold to CPX Interactive. In January 2020, Spin and Stereogum were sold to Next Management Partners and the site's management, respectively, as part of a larger focus on Vibe and a music data business.

== Filmography ==
=== Film projects ===
Films produced or co-financed by MRC have included:

Year	Title	Details				
Year	Title	Director(s)	Co-production company(s)	Distributor(s)	Budget	Gross
2006	Babel	Alejandro González Iñárritu	Paramount Vantage; Anonymous Content; Zeta Film; Central Films	Paramount Pictures (English-speaking territories, Latin America and Spain); StudioCanal (France); Summit Entertainment (International)	$25 million	$135.3 million
2008	Linha de Passe	Walter Salles; Daniela Thomas	Pathé; Videofilmes	Universal Pictures	—N/a	—N/a
2009	Brüno	Larry Charles	Four by Two Films; Everyman Pictures	Universal Pictures	$42 million	$138.8 million
2009	Shorts	Robert Rodriguez	Imagenation Abu Dhabi; Troublemaker Studios	Warner Bros. Pictures	$20 million	$29 million
2009	The Invention of Lying	Ricky Gervais; Matthew Robinson	Radar Pictures; Lynda Obst Productions	Warner Bros. Pictures (United States); Focus Features (International)	$18.5 million	$32.7 million
2009	The Box	Richard Kelly	Radar Pictures	Warner Bros. Pictures (North America); The Weinstein Company (International)	$30 million	$33.3 million
2010	Devil	John Erick Dowdle	The Night Chronicles	Universal Pictures	$10 million	$62.6 million
2011	The Adjustment Bureau	George Nolfi	Gambit Pictures; Electric Shepherd Productions	Universal Pictures	$62 million	$127.8 million
2011	30 Minutes or Less	Ruben Fleischer	Columbia Pictures; Red Hour Productions	Sony Pictures Releasing	$28 million	$40.7 million
2012	Ted	Seth MacFarlane	Fuzzy Door Productions; Bluegrass Films; Smart Entertainment	Universal Pictures	$50–65 million	$549.4 million
2013	Elysium	Neill Blomkamp	TriStar Pictures; QED International; Alphacore; Kinberg Genre	Sony Pictures Releasing	$115 million	$286.1 million
2014	A Million Ways to Die in the West	Seth MacFarlane	Fuzzy Door Productions; Bluegrass Films	Universal Pictures	$40 million	$87.2 million
2014	22 Jump Street	Phil Lord; Christopher Miller	Columbia Pictures; Metro-Goldwyn-Mayer; LStar Capital; Original Film; Cannell Studios; Storyville; 75 Year Plan Productions	Sony Pictures Releasing	$50–84.5 million	$331.3 million
2014	Think Like a Man Too	Tim Story	Screen Gems; Will Packer Productions	Sony Pictures Releasing	$24 million	$70.2 million
2014	Sex Tape	Jake Kasdan	Columbia Pictures; LStar Capital; Escape Artists	Sony Pictures Releasing	$40 million	$126.3 million
2015	Chappie	Neill Blomkamp	Columbia Pictures; LStar Capital; Kinberg Genre	Sony Pictures Releasing	$49 million	$102.1 million
2015	Furious 7	James Wan	Original Film; One Race Films; China Film Co., Ltd.	Universal Pictures	$190 million	$1.515 billion
2015	Ted 2	Seth MacFarlane	Fuzzy Door Productions; Bluegrass Films	Universal Pictures	$68 million	$215.9 million
2015	Hotel Transylvania 2	Genndy Tartakovsky	Columbia Pictures; Sony Pictures Animation; LStar Capital	Sony Pictures Releasing	$80 million	$474.8 million
2017	Baby Driver	Edgar Wright	TriStar Pictures; Big Talk Productions; Working Title Films	Sony Pictures Releasing	$34 million	$226.9 million
2017	The Dark Tower	Nikolaj Arcel	Columbia Pictures; Imagine Entertainment; Weed Road Pictures	Sony Pictures Releasing	$66 million	$113.2 million
2018	Hotel Transylvania 3: Summer Vacation	Genndy Tartakovsky	Columbia Pictures; Sony Pictures Animation	Sony Pictures Releasing	$65–80 million	$528.6 million
2018	Mortal Engines	Christian Rivers	Scholastic Entertainment; Silvertongue Films; Perfect World Pictures; WingNut Films	Universal Pictures	$100–150 million	$83.7 million
2019	Dora and the Lost City of Gold	James Bobin	Paramount Players; Nickelodeon Movies; Walden Media; Burr! Productions	Paramount Pictures	$49 million	$120.6 million
2019	Knives Out	Rian Johnson	T-Street Productions; Ram Bergman Productions	Lionsgate	$40 million	$312.9 million
2020	The Lovebirds	Michael Showalter	Paramount Pictures; 3 Arts Entertainment; Quinn's House	Netflix	$16 million	—N/a
2021	The SpongeBob Movie: Sponge on the Run	Tim Hill	Paramount Animation; Nickelodeon Movies; United Plankton Pictures	Paramount Pictures (Canada and China); Paramount+ (United States); Netflix (International)	$60 million	$4.8 million
2021	The Sparks Brothers	Edgar Wright	Complete Fiction Pictures	Focus Features (worldwide); Universal Pictures (International)	—N/a	$1.2 million
2021	Peter Rabbit 2: The Runaway	Will Gluck	Columbia Pictures; Animal Logic; 2.0 Entertainment; Olive Bridge Entertainment	Sony Pictures Releasing	$45 million	$154 million
2022	Hotel Transylvania: Transformania	Derek Drymon; Jennifer Kluska	Columbia Pictures; Sony Pictures Animation	Amazon Studios (worldwide); Sony Pictures Releasing (China)	$75 million	$18.5 million
2022	Jerry & Marge Go Large	David Frankel	Paramount Players; Levantine Films	Paramount+	—N/a	—N/a
2022	Persuasion	Carrie Cracknell	Bisous Pictures; Mad Chance; Fourth and Twenty Eight Films	Netflix	—N/a	—N/a
2022	The Last Rider	Alex Holmes	New Black Films	Roadside Attractions (United States and Canada); Dogwoof (International)	—N/a	$253,770
2023	The Blackening	Tim Story	The Story Company; Tracy Yvonne Productions; Artists First; Catchlight Studios	Lionsgate (worldwide); Universal Pictures (International)	$5 million	$18.6 million
2023	Fair Play	Chloe Domont	T-Street; Star Thrower Entertainment	Netflix	—N/a	—N/a
2023	Milli Vanilli	Luke Korem	MTV Entertainment Studios; Keep on Running Pictures	Paramount+	—N/a	—N/a
2023	Self Reliance	Jake Johnson	Clown Show; Lonely Island Classics; Walcott Productions	Hulu; Neon (United States); Republic Pictures (International)	—N/a	—N/a
2023	Saltburn	Emerald Fennell	Metro-Goldwyn-Mayer; Lie Still; LuckyChap Entertainment	Amazon MGM Studios (United States); Warner Bros. Pictures (United Kingdom/Ireland)	—N/a	$21.1 million
2023	American Fiction	Cord Jefferson	T-Street; Almost Infinite; 3 Arts Entertainment	Orion Pictures (through Amazon MGM Studios)	$10 million	$23 million
2023	The Contestant	Clair Titley	Misfits Entertainment	Hulu	—N/a	—N/a
2024	The Greatest Night in Pop	Bao Nguyen	Republic Pictures; Dorothy Street Pictures; MakeMake Entertainment	Netflix	—N/a	—N/a
2024	Snack Shack	Adam Carter Rehmeier	Paperclip Limited; T-Street	Republic Pictures	$4.5 million	$455,708
2024	Blink	Edmund Stenson; Daniel Roher	Fishbowl Films; Eyesteel Film	Walt Disney Pictures (through Walt Disney Studios Motion Pictures; United States and Canada); National Geographic Documentary Films (Worldwide)	—N/a	—N/a
2025	SLY LIVES! (aka The Burden of Black Genius)	Ahmir "Questlove" Thompson	Onyx Collective; Two One Five Entertainment; RadicalMedia; Stardust Films; Network Entertainment; Sony Music Entertainment; ID8 Multimedia	Hulu (United States); Disney+ (worldwide)	—N/a	—N/a
2025	G20	Patricia Riggen	JuVee Productions; Mad Chance Productions	Amazon MGM Studios	—N/a	—N/a
2025	All of You	William Bridges	Republic Pictures; Ryder Picture Company	Apple TV+	—N/a	—N/a
2025	All the Devils Are Here	Barnaby Roper	T-Street Productions	Republic Pictures	—N/a	—N/a
2025	The SpongeBob Movie: Search for SquarePants	Derek Drymon	Paramount Animation; Nickelodeon Movies	Paramount Pictures	$64 million	$169.1 million
2026	The Gallerist	Cathy Yan	MountainA; Concordia Studio; Slow Pony	Roadside Attractions; Vertical	—N/a	—N/a
2026	The Only Living Pickpocket in New York	Noah Segan	T-Street Productions	Sony Pictures Classics	—N/a	—N/a
2026	Wuthering Heights	Emerald Fennell	LuckyChap Entertainment	Warner Bros. Pictures	$80 million	$241.7 million
2026	The Love Hypothesis	Claire Scanlon		Amazon MGM Studios	—N/a	—N/a
2026	Unabomber	Janus Metz Pedersen	2.0 Entertainment	Netflix	—N/a	—N/a
2026	Let's Have Kids!	Adam Sztykiel	A Dare To Be Great Situation	Republic Pictures	—N/a	—N/a
2027	A Place in Hell	Chloe Domont	Republic Pictures; T-Street Productions	Neon (United States); Republic Pictures (International; through Paramount Pictures)	—N/a	—N/a
2027	They Know	Bill Hader	Hanarply	Black Bear Pictures	—N/a	—N/a
TBA	Eloise	Amy Sherman-Palladino	HandMade Films; Simon & Schuster; Maximum Effort	Netflix	—N/a	—N/a
TBA	Good People, Bad Things	Ninian Doff	Present Company Inc. Hoorae Media	Paramount Pictures	—N/a	—N/a
TBA	Honeymoon / Funeral	Nahnatchka Khan	Fierce Baby; FilmNation Entertainment	Black Bear Pictures	—N/a	—N/a
TBA	Mother's Helper	Bridget Moloney	Ryder Picture Company	TBA	—N/a	—N/a
TBA	The Best Is Yet to Come	Jon Turteltaub	Gidden Media; Chapter 2	Lionsgate	—N/a	—N/a
TBA	White Elephant	Eli Craig	Radio Silence Productions; Project X Entertainment	TBA	—N/a	—N/a

=== Television projects ===
Original run	Title	Details				
Original run	Title	Creator(s)	Co-production company(s)	Network(s)	Season(s)	Episodes
2008–2009	Seth MacFarlane's Cavalcade of Cartoon Comedy	Seth MacFarlane	Fuzzy Door Productions; Main Street Pictures	YouTube	1	50
2008–2012	The Life & Times of Tim	Steve Dildarian	HBO Entertainment; Insane Loon Productions; Warner Bros. Television	HBO	3	30
2008	In Harm's Way	Craig Piligian	Pilgrim Studios	The CW	1	8
2008–2009	Valentine	Kevin Murphy	Five & Dime Productions	The CW	1	8
2008–2009	Easy Money	Diane Frolov; Andrew Schneider	Hat Trick Productions	The CW	1	8
2008–2009	Rita Rocks	James Berg; Stan Zimmerman	Zimmerman-Berg; Lifetime Television	Lifetime	2	40
2009	Surviving Suburbia	Kevin Abbott	Acme Productions; NestEgg Productions	ABC	1	13
2009	Kröd Mändoon and the Flaming Sword of Fire	Peter A. Knight; Developed by: Peter A. Knight and Brad Johnson	Hat Trick Productions; Watson Pond Productions	Comedy Central (U.S.); BBC Two / BBC HD (UK)	1	6
2009	The Goode Family	Mike Judge; John Altschuler; Dave Krinsky	Ternion Pictures; 3 Arts Entertainment; Judgemental Films	ABC	1	13
2009–2010	Shaq Vs.		Dick Clark Productions	ABC	2	10
2010–2012	The Ricky Gervais Show	Ricky Gervais; Stephen Merchant; Karl Pilkington	WildBrain Entertainment; HBO Entertainment	HBO (U.S.); Channel 4/E4 (United Kingdom)	3	39
2011–2012	How to Be a Gentleman	David Hornsby	CBS Productions	CBS	1	9
2013–2018	House of Cards	Beau Willimon	Trigger Street Productions; Wade/Thomas Productions; Knight Takes King Productions	Netflix	6	73
2015–2016	Blunt Talk	Jonathan Ames	The Herring Wonder; Fuzzy Door Productions	Starz	2	20
2017–2022	Ozark	Bill Dubuque; Mark Williams	Aggregate Films; Zero Gravity Management; Headhunter Films; Man, Woman & Child Productions	Netflix	4	44
2017–2019	Counterpart	Justin Marks	Gilbert Films; Anonymous Content; Gate 34; Studio Babelsberg; Starz Originals	Starz	2	20
2020	The Outsider	The Outsider by Stephen King Developed by: Richard Price	Aggregate Films; Temple Hill Entertainment; Pieface Inc. Civic Center Media	HBO	1	10
2020–2023	The Great	Tony McNamara	Thruline Entertainment; Echo Lake Entertainment; Lewellen Pictures; Macgowan Films; Piggy Ate Roast Beef Productions; Civic Center Media	Hulu (U.S.); Disney+ (worldwide)	3	30
2021	The Shrink Next Door	The Shrink Next Door by Joe Nocera Developed by: Georgia Pritchett	Gloria Sanchez Productions; Buckaroo; Small Mammal Productions; Semi-Formal Productions; Bloomberg Media; Wondery; Civic Center Media	Apple TV+	1	8
2022	Shining Girls	Silka Luisa	Love & Squalor Pictures; Michelle MacLaren Entertainment; Appian Way Productions	Apple TV+	1	8
2022	So You Think You Can Dance	Simon Fuller; Nigel Lythgoe; Developed by: Simon Fuller	19 Entertainment; Dick Clark Productions	Fox	18	312
2022–present	The Terminal List	David DiGilio	Amazon MGM Studios; Indivisible Productions; Fuqua Films; DiGilio Films; Civic Center Media	Amazon Prime Video	1	8
2023–2025	Poker Face	Rian Johnson	Zucks. Animal Pictures; T-Street	Peacock	2	22
2023	Hello Tomorrow!	Amit Bhalla; Lucas Jansen	Mortal Media; Froward Enterprise; Ceremony Pictures; Hooptie Filmed Entertainment; Apple Studios	Apple TV+	1	10
2024–2026	Ted	Seth MacFarlane	Fuzzy Door Productions; Universal Content Productions	Peacock	2	15
2024	Time Bandits	Jemaine Clement; Iain Morris; Taika Waititi	Waititi; Waka Atea; HandMade Films; Anonymous Content; Paramount Television Studios	Apple TV+	1	10
2025	The Terminal List: Dark Wolf	David DiGilio; Jack Carr	Amazon MGM Studios; Indivisible Productions; Hill District Media; DiGilio Films; Civic Center Media	Amazon Prime Video	1	7
2026	M.I.A	Bill Dubuque	Headhunter Films Inc. McQuaid	Peacock	1	9
