= Celebuzz =

Entertainment website

- Website type: Celebrity News
- Available in: English
- Owner: Consumed Media
- Editor: Kelly Lynch
- Website: celebuzz.com
- Commercial: Yes
- Launched: June 3, 2008

Celebuzz is an entertainment website launched in June 2008 that features breaking TV, movie, and entertainment news. Headquartered in Hollywood, CA, Celebuzz is known for featuring exclusive blogs written by A-list celebrities, particularly members of the Kardashian family (Kim, Khloe, Kourtney, Kendall, and Kylie). Other notable bloggers include Whitney Port, Nick Cannon and Holly Madison.

Launched in June 2008, Celebuzz was the flagship property of Buzz Media (formerly known as Buzznet). Celebuzz's content is produced entirely by an in-house editorial team in Los Angeles and New York City led by Editor-in-Chief Dylan Howard, who joined the site in March 2012 after previously serving as Senior Executive Editor at Radar Online.

In Fall 2012, Buzz Media and Celebuzz unveiled a studio at the Buzz Media headquarters in Hollywood. Buzz Media was later renamed SpinMedia.

Kelly Lynch became Editor-in-Chief of Celebuzz in April 2013.

In 2016, SpinMedia closed. Celebuzz, The Frisky, and The Superficial were sold to CPX Interactive.
