= The Frisky =

2008–2016 women's entertainment and lifestyle website

- Website type: Women's entertainment, lifestyle
- Available in: English
- Dissolved: June 2018; 8 years ago
- Website: thefrisky.com
- Launched: 2008
- Current status: Defunct

The Frisky was a women's entertainment and lifestyle website, operating from 2008 until 2016.

In 2010, The Frisky had more than 2 million average monthly readers (as measured by comScore) making it one of the leading woman's interest sites in the United States. The Frisky was described as newer women's media, as compared to traditional women's magazines such as Redbook, Cosmopolitan, Glamour, and the Ladies Home Journal.

In 2011, Buzzmedia (now SpinMedia) acquired The Frisky from their previous owner, Turner Broadcasting System.

In November 2015, The Frisky cancelled adult film star James Deen's sex advice column and removed ads and links to Deen's official website after Deen was accused of multiple counts of rape and sexual assault.

In 2016, SpinMedia closed. The Frisky and two other SpinMedia sites, Celebuzz and The Superficial, were sold to CPX Interactive.

In 2018, The Frisky was acquired by Serbian music producer Nebojsa Vujinovic. Vujinovic republished old articles from The Frisky, removing most of the political articles and replacing the names of The Frisky authors with pseudonyms. New articles on The Frisky are paid guest posts used for search-engine optimization, advertising, and political manipulation. Over 20 articles, many of which had been previously published elsewhere, are published daily. The identities of the organizations paying for those articles are not known.

== See also ==
- The Hairpin
