= The Superficial =

Celebrity gossip website

- Website type: Gossip/celebrity blog
- Available in: English
- Owner: Consumed Media
- Website: The Superficial
- Launched: May 2004
- Current status: Inactive

The Superficial was a website devoted to celebrity gossip. It was founded on May 23, 2004, and quickly grew in popularity. The Superficial was a part of Anticlown Media, along with other sites such as IWatchStuff.com and Geekologie.com. The website was controversial due to its satirical, often derogatory content. The site was updated several times a day and had an Alexa traffic ranking of 1,099 within the United States as of June 23, 2012. It was named one of the five best celebrity news websites by Steve Johnson of the Chicago Tribune.

The Superficial was notable for emphasizing paparazzi celebrity photographs, and for its blunt, critical assessment of both celebrities' physical appearances and their questionable behavior. The site was originally written by Anticlown Media founder Karl Wang who later began experimenting with other writers as the anonymous "voice" of the site. In August 2007, Wang hired Mike Redmond, who became the longtime head writer.

In 2009, Buzz Media (later rebranded as SpinMedia) purchased The Superficial from Anticlown Media. Due to the site's success, Redmond hired Carmen Ribecca, who was referred to on the site by the nickname Photo Boy. Ribecca maintained "The Crap We Missed" photo feature and served as a backup writer.

On December 23, 2016, Celebuzz, The Frisky, and The Superficial were sold to CPX Interactive, which rebranded itself as Digital Remedy after the purchase. Digital Remedy operated The Superficial as a publication of their Nibble imprint.

Three months after the purchase, Redmond and Ribecca simultaneously resigned from The Superficial on March 20, 2017.

In January 2018, The Superficial became inactive during a short run by writer "Randy Cappuccino" who was not received well by the site's audience. The most recent update was posted on January 3, 2018. No statement regarding the site's status has been issued by The Superficial or its parent company Digital Remedy. On February 2, 2018, The Superficial homepage became a redirect to the entertainment website Celebuzz.

On April 26, 2018, Redmond reported on Twitter that all of The Superficial's content was "wiped" (or at least made unavailable) that day. He stated that he had used the site the night before to collect clips from his previous writing. The homepage and all former article links now redirect to the Celebuzz homepage.
