= Seth MacFarlane's Cavalcade of Cartoon Comedy =

- Genre: Sketch comedy Satire; Parody; Black comedy
- Created by: Seth MacFarlane
- Directed by: Greg Colton; Seth MacFarlane
- Voices of: Seth MacFarlane; Various
- Theme music composer: Walter Murphy
- Composer: Walter Murphy
- Country of origin: United States
- Original language: English
- No. of seasons: 1
- No. of episodes: 50

Production
- Executive producers: Aaron Parry; Nicholisa Contis
- Producer: Andrew Egiziano
- Editor: Andy Tauke
- Running time: 1–2 minutes
- Production companies: Fuzzy Door Productions; Main Street Pictures; Media Rights Capital; YouTube Studio

Original release
- Network: YouTube
- Release: September 10, 2008 – June 12, 2009

Seth MacFarlane's Cavalcade of Cartoon Comedy is an American adult animated web series created by Seth MacFarlane.

== Series overview ==
This series is a compilation of animated sketches released on YouTube. The series, which aired several episodes a month, was originally sponsored by Burger King, who sponsored the first 10 shorts, with videos appearing on their official channel. The series was then sponsored by Priceline.com, and finally, Nike. There are a total of 50 episodes. It saw a successful launch on MacFarlane's YouTube channel, SethComedy, which became the most watched YouTube channel of the week, generating three million video views within two days of the first episode's release. MacFarlane later expressed disappointment with the quality of the series, believing he had been unable to give the show the commitment it needed at the time. The series is comparable to MacFarlane's other animated shows; Family Guy, American Dad! and The Cleveland Show.

== Home media ==
The first season, with additional content, was released on DVD, Blu-ray Disc and UMD Video on May 12, 2009, by 20th Century Fox Home Entertainment, and was released on DVD in the UK on January 25, 2010. In addition to the 23 episodes officially released online, 27 episodes were exclusively included on the DVD and Blu-ray release. The release uncensored the first eleven episodes which were censored online.

== Episodes ==
=== Series overview ===
Seasons	Episodes	First airdate	Last airdate
Online	23	September 10, 2008	June 12, 2009
DVD	27†	May 12, 2009	

† A few shorts were later released online with censored language and dialogue between February and April 2010.

=== Online release (2008–2009) ===
These animated sketches were released on YouTube.

No.	Title	Performed by	Directed by	Written by	Length	Original release date	Prod. code
1	"Super Mario Rescues the Princess"	Seth MacFarlane as Mario; Alex Breckenridge as Princess Peach	Greg Colton	Story by : Seth MacFarlane; Teleplay by : Seth MacFarlane & Alex Carter	1:36	September 10, 2008	015
Mario saves Princess Peach from Bowser, but the situation devolves into an argument when Peach refuses to give Mario a kiss as thanks. Mario allows Bowser to revive and eats Peach as an award.
2	"A Dog on the $25,000 Pyramid"	Seth MacFarlane as Fido; Jeff Bergman as Host; Alec Sulkin as Steve	Greg Colton	Story by : Seth MacFarlane; Teleplay by : Seth MacFarlane & Alex Carter	0:36	September 10, 2008	014
A dog and his human partner fail at The $25,000 Pyramid. (Note: The host is not named, but he looks and sounds like Dick Clark.)
3	"Why Bob Marley Should Not Have Acted as His Own Attorney"	Seth MacFarlane as Bob Marley and Policeman #2; Ralph Garman as Policeman #1; John Viener (credit only)	Greg Colton	Story by : Seth MacFarlane; Teleplay by : Seth MacFarlane & Jonathan Glodblatt	0:29	September 15, 2008	039
Bob Marley defends himself against cops when he says he "shot the sheriff".
4	"Adopted"	Seth MacFarlane as Mr. Sticknipples; Alex Borstein as Mrs. Sticknipples; Seth Green as Michael Sticknipples/Albert Horsefeet Shitsneeze	Greg Colton	Story and Teleplay by Seth MacFarlane	1:44	September 21, 2008	016
Michael's parents reveal that they are not his biological parents and that he was adopted at birth.
5	"A Scotsman Who Can't Watch a Movie Without Shouting at the Screen"	Seth MacFarlane as Scotsman	Greg Colton	Story and Teleplay by Seth MacFarlane	1:24	September 29, 2008	002
A Scotsman makes some negative comments at the mistakes made by some of America's favorite film characters while he's watching movies on his TV. He watches Tootsie, The Muppet Movie, The Breakfast Club, and Back to the Future.
6	"Two Ducks Watch Meet the Parents"	Seth MacFarlane as Duck #1; Alec Sulkin as Duck #2	Greg Colton	Story and Teleplay by Seth MacFarlane	0:41	October 3, 2008	046
Two male ducks believe that Meet the Parents isn't funny.
7	"A Scotsman Who ^^{Still} Can't Watch a Movie Without Shouting at the Screen"	Seth MacFarlane as Scotsman	Greg Colton	Story and Teleplay by Seth MacFarlane	1:34	October 13, 2008	031
The Scotsman continues to make negative comments at his TV screen while watching movies. This time, he watches Star Trek II: The Wrath of Khan, The Truman Show, Raiders of the Lost Ark, and The Shawshank Redemption.
8	"Cat Staff Meeting"	Seth MacFarlane as Dog; Danny Smith as Cat Boss	Greg Colton	Story and Teleplay by Seth MacFarlane	1:01	October 19, 2008	004
A cat staff meeting is interrupted by a dog smashing the office building with a wrecking ball.
9	"Barry Gibb Rides a Roller Coaster"	Mike Henry as Barry Gibb	Greg Colton	Story and Teleplay by Seth MacFarlane	0:10	October 26, 2008	029
Instead of screaming, Barry Gibb sings while going down on a roller coaster.
10	"Marital Troubles"	Alex Borstein as Wife	Greg Colton	Story by : Seth MacFarlane; Teleplay by : Seth MacFarlane & Kevin Biggins & Travis Bowe	0:32	November 2, 2008	025
A mime and his wife get divorced because he gave her the silent treatment.
11	"Jeff Goldblum Wafers"	Stephen Stanton as Jeff Goldblum	Greg Colton	Story and Teleplay Seth MacFarlane	1:05	November 9, 2008	047
Jeff Goldblum makes a commercial about his own wafers that talk.
12	"Jesus and Vishnu on Christmas Eve"	Alec Sulkin as Jesus; Mark Hentemann as Vishnu	Greg Colton	Story by : Seth MacFarlane; Teleplay by : Seth MacFarlane & Andrew Goldberg	0:33	December 22, 2008	040
Jesus states that he sees people decorate their homes for his birthday, but not Vishnu.
13	"The Frog Prince"	Seth MacFarlane as Frog; Rachael MacFarlane as Princess #1; Alex Breckenridge as Princess #2	Greg Colton	Story and Teleplay by Seth MacFarlane	1:12	December 30, 2008	001
The story of The Frog Prince gets perverted.
14	"Monkeys Talk About Religion"	Seth MacFarlane as Steven's Dad; James Burkholder as Steven; Kelly Wolf as Steven's Mom	Greg Colton	Story and Teleplay by Seth MacFarlane	0:55	January 6, 2009	024
A father monkey and his son discuss "Monkey God" and "Monkey Jesus".
15	"Mountain Climber"	Mark Hentemann as Mountain Climber; Rachael MacFarlane as Stephanie; Alec Sulkin as Mark; John Viener as Minister	Greg Colton	Story and Teleplay by Seth MacFarlane	0:36	January 12, 2009	005
A mountain climber poops while on top of a mountain and it lands on a couple getting married.
16	"Ted Nugent is Visited by the Ghost of Christmas Past"	Seth MacFarlane as Ghost of Christmas Past and Man #2; John Viener as Man #1; Danny Smith as Ted Nugent	Greg Colton	Story by : Seth MacFarlane; Teleplay by : Seth MacFarlane & Jonathan Glodblatt	0:26	January 18, 2009	041
Ted Nugent kills the Ghost of Christmas Past. Afterwards, his family eats it for dinner.
17	"Mad Cow Disease"	Christine Devine as Anchorwoman; Kirker Butler as Bull	Greg Colton	Story and Teleplay by Seth MacFarlane	0:34	January 27, 2009	030
A cow couple discover about mad cow disease on the news.
18	"The Bartender Says..."	Seth MacFarlane as Horse (Sarah Jessica Parker); Jackson Douglas as Mike; Phil LaMarr as Harry	Greg Colton	Story and Teleplay by Seth MacFarlane	1:03	February 5, 2009	006
Two men in a bar tell a "Bartender Says" joke about a horse. Surprisingly, a horse is in the bar and gets offended by the joke.
19	"Backstage with Bob Dylan"	Seth MacFarlane as Bob Dylan and Popeye; Danny Smith as Tom Waits; John Viener as Muhammad Ali; Rachael MacFarlane as Woman; Seth Green as Man	Greg Colton	Story by : Seth MacFarlane; Teleplay by : Seth MacFarlane, Kevin Biggins & Travis Bowe	0:55	February 17, 2009	028
Bob Dylan meets up with Tom Waits and Popeye after a concert; Dylan and Popeye get into an argument.
20	"Fred and Barney Try to Get into a Club"	Seth MacFarlane as Barney Rubble and The Great Gazoo; Jeff Bergman as Fred Flintstone; J. Lee as Bouncer	Greg Colton	Story and Teleplay by Seth MacFarlane	1:04	February 24, 2009	022
Fred Flintstone and Barney Rubble try to get into an exclusive nightclub, but are denied admission.
21	"Beavers: Assholes of the Forest"	Seth MacFarlane as Storyteller; Chris Sheridan as Beaver; Chris Cox as Fish; Mike Henry as Woodpecker; Alec Sulkin as Deer	Greg Colton	Story by : Seth MacFarlane; Teleplay by : Seth MacFarlane & Alex Carter	0:48	April 21, 2009	033
Some animals claim that a beaver messed up quite a lot of things in the forest.
22	"Things You Never Hear"	Seth MacFarlane; Jen Birmingham; Mark Hentemann; Alec Sulkin; John Viener; Danny Smith; Jackson Douglas; Rachael MacFarlane; Lisa Wilhoit; Ralph Garman; Mike Henry; Chace Crawford; Seth Green; Chris Cox; Alex Borstein	Greg Colton	Story by : Seth MacFarlane; Teleplay by : Seth MacFarlane & Julius Sharpe	1:39	May 23, 2009	044
This episode counts down the top ten things one never hears.
23	"A Trip to the Psychiatrist"	Seth MacFarlane as Psychiatrist; Alex Borstein as Abbie	Seth MacFarlane	Story by : Seth MacFarlane; Teleplay by : Seth MacFarlane & Andrew Goldberg	1:17	June 12, 2009	034
A bulimic woman named Abbie visits a psychiatrist.

=== Exclusively on DVD (2009–2010) ===
The remaining 27 shorts were all released with the previous 23 released shorts on DVD and Blu-Ray on May 12, 2009. The few shorts that were later uploaded to YouTube in 2010 but were censored for language. Since these shorts weren't released separately with ending credits, it's currently unknown who wrote, directed, and voiced the following shorts.

No.	Title	Length	Prod. code
24	"AIDS Patient Zero"	2:11	003
A Canadian man and monkey have gay sex, where a bombshell is dropped.
25	"Name that Animal Penis!"	1:57	007
A game show about figuring out an animal's penis is much more difficult than imagined.
26	"Die, Sweet Roadrunner, Die"	2:08	008
Wile E. Coyote succeeds in killing the Road Runner, but is now left with the question; "What do I do now?" He then works at a restaurant but got fired after raging himself from saying sorry for giving the customer the wrong order. He tries to commit suicide by using a contraption. Then he gets an idea, and becomes a religious Christian afterwards.: A censored version of this episode aired online in February 2010. Also, instead of speaking with a British accent, Wile E. speaks with an American accent.
27	"Sex With...#1"	0:57	009
A showcase of sexual moments, which include...: Mr. Sulu; A Folk Singer; A Necrophiliac; A Trapeze Artist
28	"A Fat Guy Working Out"	0:15	010
A fat guy is going to work out... and then puts it off and gets a sandwich.
29	"The Gay Knight"	1:27	011
A gay knight refuses to fight dragons due to not wanting to be killed.: A censored version of this episode aired online in March 2010.
30	"A Douchebag Unicorn Gives a Public Service Announcement"	0:37	012
A Douchebag Unicorn ends up giving a PSA about how Marijuana is great and how you should write down your ideas.
31	"Fred Flintstone Takes a Shit"	1:09	013
Fred Flintstone takes a shit... that's about it.
32	"Stuck in a Life Raft with Matthew McConaughey"	2:05	017
A random man stuck on a life raft with Matthew McConaughey resorts to cutting off his leg for food and eventually stabbing him in the chest as Matthew just prattles on.
33	"Two Persian Guys Try to Get Ladies into their Sports Car"	1:04	018
Two Persian guys act like stereotypes to get ladies in their sports car for a night on the town.
34	"He Who Lives in a Glass House..."	1:36	019
A man who lives in a glass house has a machine gun installed on his roof to fend off annoying neighbors.: A censored version of this episode aired online in April 2010.
35	"Sex With...#2"	0:56	020
Another showcase of sexual moments, which include...: Dick Cheney; Gilbert Gottfried; A Midget; Optimus Prime
36	"Quentin Tarantino Performs a Circumcision"	1:10	021
Quentin Tarantino crashes in to perform a circumcision on a baby.
37	"The Wizard of Oz, Adjusted for Reality"	1:40	023
When the group succeeds in stopping the witch, they are shocked to discover that the Wizard was literal with their requests...
38	"Why did the chicken cross the road?"	0:14	026
To have sexual relations with your mother.
39	"Sex With...#3"	0:58	027
The final showcase of sexual moments, which include...: A U.S. Senator; A Tube of Toothpaste; A Redneck; A Sheep
40	"Dirty Vaudeville"	1:02	032
Two singers sing about the smallest pussy in town.
41	"Fat Jesus"	1:33	035
Some villagers ask help from Jesus for a crippled man, but Jesus is too preoccupied with his acid reflux.
42	"Dracula Meets Magic Johnson"	0:22	036
Dracula invites Magic Johnson over for dinner with bad intentions.
43	"The Sneeze Throw-Up"	0:07	037
Exactly what it says on the tin...
44	"The Settlers' First Attempt to Buy Manhattan from the Indians"	0:30	038
Settlers attempt to give beads to the Indians in exchange for Manhattan, but things don't entirely work out.
45	"Four Years of Entourage in Ten Seconds"	0:14	042
The first four years of the Entourage series (between 2004–2008) is summed up in ten seconds.
46	"Tara Reid is Not Looking So Good Lately"	0:12	043
Apparently Tara can only speak out of her stomach.
47	"Small Talk with Aunt Helen"	1:17	045
Aunt Helen talks to her grandson about his wife and is disturbed by what they did with a slice of leftover wedding cake.
48	"Marie Antoinette's Notepad"	0:20	048
We see Marie Antoinette's process on how she came up with "Let Them Eat Cake".
49	"Sheep Shearing"	1:45	049
A sheep gets way too interested in his owner shearing him.
50	"What Happens If You Feed a Dog Chocolate While He Wears a Tin Foil Hat in the Microwave"	0:48	050
A dog is fed chocolate while he wears a tin foil hat in the microwave for 15 seconds with disastrous results. Wil Wheaton cameos at the end, explaining that it was a bad idea.
