= John Viener =

American actor

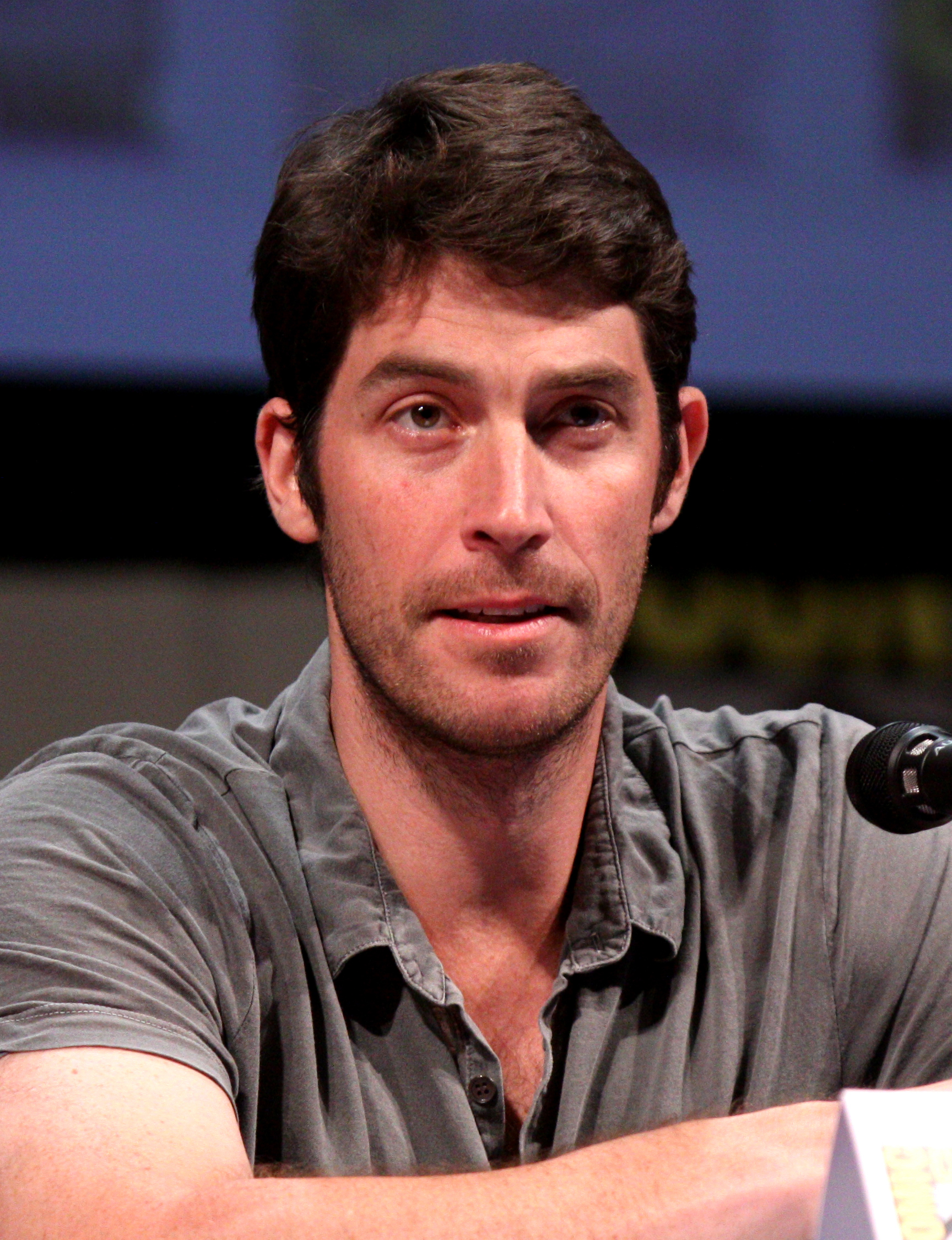
- Viener at San Diego Comic-Con, July 2011
- Occupations: Actor; comedian; writer; producer
- Years active: 1995–present

John Viener (/ˈvaɪnər/) is an American actor, comedian, writer, and producer. He is best known as a director and voice actor for various characters on the Fox animated sitcom Family Guy, as well as Norm the Robot on the Disney Channel/Disney+ animated series Phineas & Ferb.

== Early life ==
Viener graduated from Middlesex School in 1990, where he befriended Alec Sulkin.

== Career ==
He is a writer and producer on the television series Family Guy, where he also voices many miscellaneous characters.

He is also known as the voice of Norm the Robot on Phineas and Ferb.

== Filmography ==
=== Actor ===
- 2001–2002, 2005–present: Family Guy - Miscellaneous characters
- 2002: Gilda Radner: It's Always Something - Chevy Chase
- 2002: The Late Late Show with Craig Kilborn - Himself
- 2003: Scrubs - Janitor
- 2003: The Support Group - John
- 2004: Malcolm in the Middle - Guy in the Parking Lot
- 2004: The Man in the Black Suit - The Man in the Black Suit
- 2004: The Act - Comedian
- 2005–2022: American Dad! - Miscellaneous characters
- 2005: The Late Late Show with Craig Ferguson - Weatherman Bob Fogg / Bob the Groom
- 2005: Arrested Development - Frank
- 2006: Lighten Up - Bo's Friend
- 2006: Entourage - Agent
- 2006: Law & Order - Harvey Wallace
- 2007: The Half Hour News Hour - Bill Johnson
- 2008: The Onion Movie - Peen Out Guy
- 2008: Miracle of Phil - Medical Technician
- 2008: Wainy Days - Morgan Freeman
- 2008–2015, 2025–present: Phineas and Ferb - Norm/Miscellaneous characters
- 2008–2010: Seth MacFarlane's Cavalcade of Cartoon Comedy - Miscellaneous characters
- 2009–2013: The Cleveland Show - Miscellaneous Characters
- 2010–2012: The Fairly Oddparents - Police Officer / Theodore Roosevelt
- 2011: Bar Guys - Guy
- 2011: Phineas and Ferb: Across the 2nd Dimension - Norm / Normbots
- 2011: Allen Gregory - CEO
- 2011: 3 Weeks to Daytona - Rob
- 2012: Ted - Alix
- 2012: Modern Family - Matt Keneally
- 2013: Dads - Josh
- 2013: Phineas and Ferb: Quest for Cool Stuff - Norm
- 2014: Conan - I Got This Presenter
- 2014: Dumb and Dumber To - KEN Conference
- 2015: Ted 2 - Police Dispatcher
- 2015: Be Cool, Scooby-Doo! - Chuck Mangum / Zaharia Warrior / Rick
- 2016: Bordertown - Steve Hernandez
- 2017: The Orville - Talk Show Moderator
- 2018–2020: Our Cartoon President - Mike Pence / God / Howard Schultz
- 2019: Milo Murphy's Law - Norm
- 2020: Duncanville - Miscellaneous Characters
- 2020–2022: Phineas and Ferb the Movie: Candace Against the Universe - Norm
- 2022: Santaman - The Supervisor
- 2024–2026: Ted - Dr. Frankel / Delivery Man
- 2025: Grimsburg - Miscellaneous characters
- 2026: The 'Burbs - Stranger

=== Writer ===
- 1999: Trackers
- 2003: The Support Group - Developer / Screenplay
- 2005–2011: Family Guy - 9 episodes
- 2006: Lighten Up - Short Film
- 2009: Family Guy Presents: Seth and Alex's Almost Live Comedy Show
- 2011: Bar Guys - Short Film
- 2011–2013: The Cleveland Show - 4 episodes
- 2013: 85th Academy Awards - Special Material
- 2013: Dads - 3 episodes
- 2020–2022: Duncanville - 8 episodes
- 2025–present: Grimsburg - 2 episodes

=== Producer ===
- 2009–2022: Family Guy - producer (2009–2010), supervising producer (2010–2011), co-executive producer (2014), consulting producer (2015–2022)
- 2011–2013: The Cleveland Show - co-executive producer
- 2013: Dads - co-executive Producer
- 2020–2022: Duncanville - co-executive producer (2020), executive producer (2021)
- 2024: Ted - consulting producer
- 2025–present: Grimsburg - co-executive producer
