= Pilot (Duncanville) =

- Duncanville episode
- Episode no.: Season 1 Episode 1
- Directed by: Anne Walker Farrell
- Story by: Amy Poehler & Julie Thacker Scully & Mike Scully
- Teleplay by: Mike Scully & Julie Thacker Scully
- Production code: 1LAZ01
- Original air date: February 16, 2020

Episode chronology
← Previous —	Next → "Red Head Redemption"

"Pilot" is the series premiere of the American animated sitcom Duncanville. It aired on February 16, 2020, on Fox, and was written by Amy Poehler, Mike Scully, and Julie Thacker and directed by Anne Walker Farrell.

== Plot ==
Lazy Oakdale teen Duncan Harris is given a rude awakening by his parents, Jack and Annie, about learning to drive. They insist that he learn so that he can be a man, but Duncan thinks that driving is old fashioned. They manage to wear him down until he agrees, mostly so that they can leave his room. Duncan is further antagonized by his younger sister Kimberly who is constantly talking down to him, while the youngest adopted sibling Jing cannot get over her unusual crush on him. Jack has Duncan drive his truck through the neighborhood, but Duncan is immediately annoyed at how overly cautious he is and leaves in frustration.

Duncan heads to the abandoned RV to hang out with his friends Yangzi, Bex and Wolf and vents his frustration over his parents' controlling nature. They are visited by Mia, Duncan's crush, who reveals that she saw Duncan drive and that he looked good. Duncan rushes home and demands that Annie teach him to drive, instead of Jack. She picks up on his newfound gumption and warns him to be responsible. The next day at school, Yangzi reveals that he got them all invites to the EDM Fest and Duncan invites Mia to join them, adding that he can drive them, albeit with an adult. To Duncan's frustration, Annie denies him the chance to go and he once again looks to his friends for help. Bex offers to bring her grandmother, Octavia, along, who spends the night sleeping in the car.

The friends sneak out and head to the EDM Fest where Duncan and Mia end up having a moment together. As they are driving home, Duncan accidentally knocks over Ol' Oakie, Oakdale's oldest tree (which was famously used to hang witches). The friends quietly drive home, but the next day, the news of Ol' Oakie's demise is heavily reported. Annie notices that Duncan is acting suspicious and realizes that he snuck out with his friends and inadvertently knocked over Ol' Oakie. The family turn on Duncan and ignore him. Realizing he messed up, he once again calls his friends and together, cut out a section of Ol' Oakie's stump that contained Jack and Annie's carving from their youth. The family forgives Duncan, but are forced to flee outside when cicadas living in the stump take over the house.

== Reception ==
Sulagna Misra of The A.V. Club gave this episode a B, stating, "Watching the premiere of Fox's Duncanville, it can be easy to forget that series co-creator Amy Poehler voices both Duncan and his mother. It’s a testament to Poehler's abilities to play children, clearly honed when she was playing the hyperactive Kaitlyn on Saturday Night Live. ... In the pilot, titled 'Pilot', however, Duncan is a lot less fun compared to Kaitlyn. That isn't a mark against the show, which has a slightly Boy Meets World vibe in its early goings, though Duncanville has more references to technology, The Simpsons surrealism, but fewer After School Special type heart-to-heart talks. But like Boy Meets World's protagonist Cory Matthews, Duncan is already the least interesting character on the show."

IndieWire gave the first two episodes a B− stating, "While confusing when trying to get a read on Duncanville, this kind of thing doesn't really matter in the long run — plenty of shows need a season or two to figure out what defines their best self. The question becomes, 'What does Duncanville want to be?' ... Will Duncanville see a shift in perspective as the writers are drawn to different characters (like a reverse of when Bob's Burgers started offering more kid-centric A-plots)? Or will it find its footing in the original direction?"

The episode was watched by 1.52 million people and scored a 0.5 rating, making it the third most watched show that night, after The Simpsons and Family Guy respectively.
