= Duncanville (TV series) =

American animated sitcom

- Genre: Animated sitcom
- Created by: Mike Scully and Julie Thacker Scully and Amy Poehler
- Voices of: Amy Poehler; Ty Burrell; Riki Lindhome; Zach Cherry; Yassir Lester; Betsy Sodaro; Joy Osmanski; Rashida Jones; Wiz Khalifa
- Music by: John Frizzell
- Opening theme: "I'm Better" by IRONTOM
- Country of origin: United States
- Original language: English
- No. of seasons: 3
- No. of episodes: 39

Production
- Executive producers: Mike Scully; Julie Thacker Scully; Amy Poehler; Dave Becky; John Viener
- Producers: Jordan Grief; Seungyong Ji; Jerron Horton
- Editors: Jonathan Polk; Nina Helene Hirten
- Running time: 22 minutes
- Production companies: Paper Kite Productions; Scullys; Universal Television; Fox Entertainment; 20th Television (Note: Known as 20th Century Fox Television for the first season.) (seasons 1–2); 20th Television Animation (season 3)

Original release
- Network: Fox
- Release: February 16, 2020 – June 26, 2022
- Network: Hulu
- Release: October 18, 2022

Duncanville is an American animated sitcom created by Amy Poehler, Mike Scully, and Julie Scully for the Fox Broadcasting Company that premiered in the United States on February 16, 2020. The series features the voices of Poehler, Ty Burrell, Riki Lindhome, Zach Cherry, Yassir Lester, Betsy Sodaro, Rashida Jones, Joy Osmanski, and Wiz Khalifa.

In June 2022, Fox ended the series after three seasons, with previously unaired episodes being burnt off on October 18, 2022 on Hulu; 39 episodes were produced.

== Premise ==
Duncanville centers on the life of Duncan Harris, an average 15-year-old boy, who is always one step away from making a bad decision. Duncan lives with his family, which includes his mother, Annie, a meter maid, who dreams of being a detective someday and always has to watch Duncan to keep him from screwing up; his father, Jack, who tries to be a better father figure to Duncan than his own father was to him; his younger 12-year-old sister Kimberly, who is an awkward and angsty tween going through normal teen phases; and his other sister Jing, an adopted intelligent five-year-old Asian, who is always giving Duncan advice. Mia is Duncan's on-and-off crush. Other recurring characters include Mr. Mitch, a teacher at the school, who works a series of other jobs; Duncan's friends, Yangzi, Bex, and Wolf; the Harris' neighbor, Helen Diggins; Jack's mean-spirited father Dick; and Annie's con-man brother, Stan Theman.

== Cast ==
The main characters of Duncanville (Counterclockwise from left) Annie, Jack (below), Jing, Kimberly, Duncan

=== Main ===
- Amy Poehler as:
  - Duncan Harris, an average teen, is average in every way and has a dream world where he is everything. He has a crush on Mia and refers to his best friends for advice and help.
  - Annie, mother to Duncan, Kimberly, and Jing, and Jack's wife, is a meter maid who strives to be a detective.
- Ty Burrell as Jack, the rock-obsessed plumber dad, tries to be a better father than his father had been.
- Riki Lindhome as Kimberly, Duncan's angsty, awkward, Wiccan 12-year-old sister with a midriff shirt and purple-dyed hair, struggles to be popular in middle school, but fails and takes her frustrations out on Duncan.
- Zach Cherry as Wolf, Duncan's monotonous friend and the object of Kimberly's affection, has issues at home and acts aloof and disinterested in things.
- Yassir Lester as Yangzi, Duncan's friend, supports various brands on Twitter, so gets free stuff from these brands. He is also a trendsetter. Yangzi is physically based on Lester.
- Betsy Sodaro as:
  - Bex, Duncan's Catholic tomboy friend. is seen as one of the boys. She later rebuffs this and says how could she be a boy when she has boobs. Bex is physically based on Sodaro. The third-season episode "(Work) Marriage Story" reveals her name is short for Elizabex.
  - Octavia, Bex's grandmother, is oblivious to her granddaughter and her friends' shenanigans and occasionally is pulled into their schemes. She is also apparently a war veteran.
- Joy Osmanski as Jing (seasons 2–3; recurring, season 1), Duncan and Kimberly's adopted five-year-old Asian little sister, has an open crush on Duncan, though she appears to have outgrown this in the second season.
- Rashida Jones as Mia (seasons 2–3; recurring, season 1), Duncan's friend and secret crush, is very liberal and likes hanging out with Duncan and his friends.
- Wiz Khalifa as Mr. Mitch (seasons 2–3; recurring, season 1), the relatable, immature but rather likeable, teacher, teaches Duncan, Yangzi, Mia, Wolf, and Bex. He has a dog named Mavis.

=== Recurring ===
- Kathy Najimy as:
  - Mayor Jen, the corrupted mayor of Oakdale
  - Helen Diggins, the Harrises' constantly inebriated and sexually frustrated neighbor
- Natalie Palamides as:
  - Bradley, Jing's friend and classmate, a precocious toddler who gives marriage and philosophical advice
  - Claire, Kimberly's nerdy best friend
  - Lil' Joey, Jing's friend and classmate, a toddler who talks with a New York-Italian accent
- James Adomian as:
  - Coach Walters, Duncan's gym teacher at Oakdale High School
  - Hal, the manager of a hardware store called Hal's Plumbing Supplies
- Jason Schwartzman as Stan Theman, Annie's con artist brother, whom she believes is a bad influence on the kids
- Gerald McRaney as Dick Harris, Jack's father, who frequently berates Jack
- John Viener as Neil LaDouche, a rich guy whom Annie chases for his unpaid parking ticket

== Episodes ==
=== Series overview ===
Season	Episodes		Originally released		
Season	Episodes		First released	Last released	Network
1	11		February 16, 2020	May 17, 2020	Fox
2	12		May 23, 2021	August 30, 2021	Fox
3	16	10	May 1, 2022	June 26, 2022	Fox
3	16	6	October 18, 2022		Hulu

=== Season 1 (2020) ===
No. overall	No. in season	Title	Directed by	Written by	Original release date	Prod. code	U.S. viewers (millions)
1	1	"Pilot"	Anne Walker Farrell	Teleplay by : Mike Scully & Julie Thacker Scully; Story by : Amy Poehler, Julie Thacker Scully & Mike Scully	February 16, 2020	1LAZ01	1.52
Duncan Harris is a typical teen who fantasizes about being a man. He is pressured by his parents to take up driving, but refuses because he does not think it is necessary and because his father, Jack, will not stop panicking when he drives. Duncan suddenly takes up an interest in driving to impress his friend and secret crush, Mia. While his mother, Annie, is happy at first, she becomes concerned when she realizes it is for a girl and bans him from going to an electronic music festival when his friends invite him. He sneaks out and they have the time of their lives. However, when driving home, Duncan accidentally knocks down Ol' Oakie, the city's oldest tree. His family finds out the next day and they refuse to speak to him. Duncan gets with his friends and they save a section of the tree stump that Annie and Jack carved their names into when they were younger. The family forgives him, but they are all forced to live in their car as their house gets taken over by the cicadas living in the stump.
2	2	"Red Head Redemption"	Jake Hollander	Julie Thacker Scully	February 23, 2020	1LAZ04	1.43
Annie demands that Jack clean out the garage of all his concert memorabilia, but finds that he is unable to do so due to sentimental value. While playing an MMORPG with his friends, Duncan has his younger sister Kimberly fill in for him briefly. When he returns, she proves to a better player than him. Duncan's friends find out and have Kimberly replace him. Feeling low, Duncan turns to a rival team, the Stay at Gnome Dads, and asks to join them for an upcoming tournament. To get back at Kimberly, Duncan discovers a shrine in Kimberly's room revealing that she has a crush on his friend Wolf. Jack attempts to throw out Annie's stuff as payback, but when their adopted youngest Jing decides to toss her things away, Jack and Annie give up on their feud and head to the tournament. Duncan's team plays his trump card, but upon seeing his parents arrive, Duncan and Kimberly give up on their feud with Duncan telling everyone that the shrine is his. Duncan's friends win and apologize for abandoning him.
3	3	"Undacuva Mutha"	Chuck Sheetz	Anthony Gioe & Nick Mandernach	March 1, 2020	1LAZ02	1.21
Annie is excited for Quota Day as she fills in her parking ticket quota in the hopes of becoming a detective one day. Duncan, Bex, and Wolf go to get their Air Jordans, only to be informed by Yangzi that they were cheated and got fakes instead. Meanwhile, Jack tries to prove he is a cool dad and has Kimberly and Jing skip school. They get home and make a "fren-cheese-y" for lunch. The following day, the three get ill and the girls blame Jack. Annie discovers a dead body, but the detectives kick her off the investigation. After hearing of Duncan's problem, she takes him around town to look for clues. They discover a white van from the docks, but their car gets chopped. As everyone solemnly waits at home, Duncan spots the van and convinces the family to chase it. It turns out that the van belongs to Duncan's teacher Mr. Mitch who has been creating fake pop up stores so that his students can pay for the school's funds for things like Hamilton. The girls forgive Jack and Annie decides to let Mr. Mitch off the hook at the insistence of Duncan.
4	4	"Witch Day"	Anne Walker Farrell	Ava Tramer & Eddie Quintana	March 8, 2020	1LAZ05	1.09
It is Witch Day and the whole town is celebrating. Jack and Annie discover that their neighbor, Mrs. Martin, has died and steal her chili recipe with the help of Jing; having won the past ten years. Mia finds the holiday offensive as it involves burning a papier-mâché witch in celebration of Oak Dale's terrible historic past. Duncan at first pays no mind, but when he is elected the new town virgin for the holiday (the previous virgin got pregnant), he and his friends decide to steal the witch. Bex, who was a distraction, lets slip that Duncan and his friends are the culprits and drag them back for the burning. Duncan threatens everyone by reading their darkest secrets, which were to be burned with the witch, and everyone lays off. Mia admits that she likes the festivities, but that everyone should be more aware of the history. Annie, having realized what she is doing to her son, apologizes for putting his name up as a virgin and she and Jack win the chili cook off. Kimberly awaits for a boy that she likes, but accidentally scares him away.
5	5	"Fridgy"	Adam Henry	John Viener	March 15, 2020	1LAZ03	1.17
The Harrises' refrigerator finally breaks down after years of use and they head to the store to buy a new one. They are greeted by Janine who presents them with a smart fridge from ConVee. The Harrises are happy with the fridge, which they name Fridgy, as it can perform all of their tasks and chores giving them ample time to do the things they have always wanted to do. However, Annie is shocked when she realizes that Fridgy keeps a tab on many of her personal things, such as having sex with Jack on the kitchen floor, and finds herself left out of the family's personal time. When she confronts Fridgy about it, it locks the Harrises in the house. They escape, but are taken to the ConVee headquarters where Janine wants them to be the family of the future. Annie gives a speech about making an effort and the family agree with her. Janine threatens to kill them, but the Harrises have the appliances fight one another and they escape the exploding base. The family dig up their old busted refrigerator and "enjoy" their family time together.
6	6	"Sister, Wife"	Chuck Sheetz	Teleplay by : Andrew Lee; Story by : Julie Thacker Scully & Amy Poehler	March 22, 2020	1LAZ06	1.07
Jack and Annie decide to spend their anniversary by shopping at the home improvement store and take Kimberly with them, though they continuously fail to remember that she is with them. Duncan and Jing play at home, but when the latter decides to "get married", Duncan finds himself going through with it, complete with Bex serving as the minister. The kids tell Jack and Annie that they are boring and they decide to prove them wrong by going out. After many failed excursions, they end up at an 80's themed bar that has the real ALF (Paul Fusco), but Annie gets mad at Jack when he refuses to punch a guy that was hitting on her. Meanwhile, Jing and Duncan go through the woes of marriage with the former taking it way too seriously and Kimberly tries to seek attention. Eventually, Kimberly tells everyone to get over their relationship issues. Duncan forgives Jing and she apologizes for forcing marriage on him as she is too young. Jack and Annie go back to the bar with the former getting into a fight and afterwards, the two have sex in their car.
7	7	"Jack's Pipe Dream"	Adam Henry	Teleplay by : Julie Thacker Scully & Mike Scully; Story by : John Viener	April 19, 2020	1LAZ07	1.11
Jack discovers that his plumbing appointments have cancelled in favor of getting help from an attractive Aussie plumber named Bobby Bastille. Feeling he cannot compete, his family convince him to find a new avenue in life. Jack reveals that he has been writing a rock opera called Rommy, which clearly takes cues from Tommy, and convinces his family to perform in it, despite its clearly awful inception and development. Duncan and Kimberly are initially disgusted with their roles (playing the lead and pregnant girlfriend), but after telling their friends about it, who actually seem intrigued by it, they decide to go through with the musical. Annie gets rid of the flyers by dumping them in the sewers, but it causes the town to flood. The townspeople rush to the theater while Rommy is on and Jack is asked to fix the town's plumbing. Bobby is revealed to not actually be a real plumber and he fills in for Jack in the last number. The play ends up being a huge success and the town is saved with Jack deciding to return to his old job. Bobby ends up going to Hollywood.
8	8	"Judge Annie"	Jake Hollander	Teleplay by : Anthony Gioe & Nick Mandernach; Story by : Julie Thacker Scully	April 26, 2020	1LAZ08	0.98
On the hottest day in Oakdale, Jack and Annie remember that they used to go to a swimming hole in their youth and take the kids there. They end up enjoying their time together, but on the way home, Annie sees an illegally parked vehicle and discovers that it belongs to a rich man named Neil LaDouche. LaDouche contests his ticket, but Annie manages to get him to pay up. Mayor Jen, seeing Annie's argument, decides to make her the lead in a public access series called Judge Annie with Jack as her bailiff. Duncan and Kimberly bring their friends to the hole and have a good time. When they revisit the next day, they discover that LaDouche has bought the land. They bring the case to Annie, but she is powerless to do anything. The kids all skinny dip in protest against LaDouche. However, the Squirrel Man, a supposed mythical legend, appears and reveals that he has squatted in the land for 50 years and thus owns the property. LaDouche is kicked out, the kids enjoy the hole, and the Squirrel Man says Annie stopped being a judge.
9	9	"Free Range Children"	Anne Walker Farrell	Teleplay by : Mike Scully & John Viener; Story by : Amy Poehler & Julie Thacker Scully	May 3, 2020	1LAZ09	0.95
Jack and Annie leave the kids in charge while they go see Bruce Springsteen, only to turn back around when the house catches fire. Annoyed that the kids cannot take care of themselves, Bradley, their psychology expert toddler neighbor, suggests that they try free range parenting. The kids have trouble grasping to make simple decisions, but after a week's worth of free range parenting, Duncan and Kimberly begin to feel confident enough to go out on their own. Meanwhile, Jing is annoyed that she is still viewed as a child by Jack and Annie. While trying to get lettuce, Duncan and Kimberly end up on a truck bound for Mexico and call their parents who rush to the airport, only to be detained, but are later rescued by a mature Jing. Duncan and Kimberly meet notorious drug dealer El Espantoso who they befriend after using what Jack and Annie taught them. He takes them back home and tells Jack and Annie that they should cherish their children's youth. He is gunned down for being on American soil and Annie accidentally eats some of his cocaine.
10	10	"Wolf Mother"	Adam Henry & Will Strode	Teleplay by : Henry Gammill & Mike Scully; Story by : Rebecca Hoobler & Eddie Quintana	May 10, 2020	1LAZ11	0.86
For Mother's Day, the Harris family take Annie to a paintball game, greatly disappointing her. While returning home without her family, Annie spots Wolf living on the streets, and decides to adopt him, molding him into the perfect son. Everyone, with the exception of Kimberly, does not like Wolf's company. Realizing he made a mistake, Jack takes Kimberly to look for a special flower that Annie always adored called the Fiordaliso. They go to the mountains to get it, but get stuck in a cliff. Annie turns Wolf into a clean person who begins to mimic some of her mannerisms. Duncan and Jing eventually deduce that Annie simply wants to get an award at their church for her Good Samaritan work. They learn of Jack and Kimberly's predicament and head to the mountains to rescue them. Annie admits that she made a mistake taming Wolf and they change him back to his old ways to rescue Jack and Kimberly. The family apologize for not appreciating Annie and they take her to her favorite restaurant where she shoots them with a paintball gun.
11	11	"Classless President"	Chuck Sheetz	Teleplay by : Andrew Lee & Eddie Quintana; Story by : Sara Scully	May 17, 2020	1LAZ10	1.21
Mia is running for class president, but is disappointed that no one is running against her. She convinces Duncan to run where, to her astonishment, he takes to it easily when he promises everyone whatever they want at the school. He ends up winning; effectively taking the school over with a bunch of ridiculous promises and rules due to an old treaty. Meanwhile, Kimberly must sell cookies for her school in the hopes that she can hang out with the mean girls. She feigns failure to Jack and Annie who, along with Jing, sell all of her cookies. They discover Kimberly's ruse and get back at her, by convincing her that the cookies were poisoned; forcing her to recollect them all. Eventually, Duncan realizes the pressure of being class president, but cannot resist the urge to invite internet stars, the Fabulous Flossing Bears to the school. Mia convinces everyone that things need to go back to normal and calms the bears when they go on a rampage. Duncan apologizes for ignoring Mia's warnings and she forgives him by agreeing to eat nachos with him.

=== Season 2 (2021) ===
No. overall	No. in season	Title	Directed by	Written by	Original release date	Prod. code	U.S. viewers (millions)
12	1	"Das Banana Boot"	Anne Walker Farrell	Teleplay by : Aseem Batra & Jerron Horton; Story by : Mike Scully & Julie Thacker Scully	May 23, 2021	2LAZ01	0.80
Duncan discovers that he does not need to take summer school as all he needs to do is pass a physical exam and the family can have a full on vacation. After doing so, the Harrises go on vacation to a resort, but Duncan becomes nervous when he sees Mia hanging out with another guy, Kimberly decides to change her look to impress a boy named Jeremy, and Jing desperately wants to make an art piece to go on the fridge. Jack and Annie meet a couple named Nick and Nina, but they become too close to them. Annie wants to have a family moment on a banana boat and forces Jack to break things off with the couple. However, Nick and Nina get revenge by stealing their banana boat, during which Kimberly discovers that Jeremy's real name is Norm and has similar problems to her. The Harrises get the boat, but think they have killed Nick and Nina. They turn out to be alive and like to scam hotels. Upon returning home, Jing makes artwork that gets put on the fridge and Duncan learns that Mia was with an ex, but that she was not interested in getting back.
13	2	"Duncan's New Word"	Jake Hollander	Mike Scully & Julie Thacker Scully	May 23, 2021	2LAZ02	0.71
Duncan goes to hang out with his friends and Mia offers him to hang out at her house. Duncan ends up overstaying his curfew, forcing the Harrises to go to pick him up. Annie forces Jack to go and confront him and the situation escalates until Duncan yells "F*** you, Jack!" and runs away. Despite his praise at school, Mr. Mitch forces Duncan to empathize and he begs Jack to punish him. However, Jack actually respects Duncan for what he has done because he could never do the same with his father, Dick, and decide to visit him in the nursing home. Meanwhile, Kimberly and Jing take advantage of the situation by doing things unsupervised. They try to ride a horse but discover that it was Annie's police horse before she abandoned him and she apologizes. Duncan and Jack meet Dick who seems genuinely remorseful of his actions, but Duncan realizes that he is on pills and berates Jack again and Duncan as well. Jack finally yells "F*** you, Dick!", resulting in an irate Dick knocking him through a window, and he and Duncan happily drive home.
14	3	"Who's Vroomin' Who?"	Corey Barnes	Teleplay by : John Viener & Jerron Horton; Story by : Julie Thacker Scully & Mike Scully	May 31, 2021	2LAZ04	0.74
Jing wants her bedroom to be changed so Jack tries to renovate her room while she rooms with Kimberly. Meanwhile, Annie comes to realization that Duncan has outgrown her when he decides to bowl with his friends instead of her. They see a stock car racing field where Mia is working at and Duncan takes the wheel of the car she is sponsoring. Annie ends up joining him and the two become an unstoppable racing team. Kimberly grows tired of Jing and learns that Jack is nowhere near finished as he struggles for a theme, so she takes control and finish the room. Jing admits that she simply wanted to hang out with Kimberly and the girls bond. While happy at first, Duncan begins to dislike their team name as "Mama's Boy" and becomes embarrassed. Bex informs Annie of this and she decides to let Duncan drive himself. He turns out to be a disaster and Annie joins him again, though they end up in sixth place. Afterwards, Annie lets Duncan be with his friends as he promises to go bowling with her again. At night, the Harrises all communicate with walkie talkies.
15	4	"Sibling Revelry"	Marius Alecse	Teleplay by : Anthony Gioe & Nick Mandernach; Story by : Hayley Frazier & James Heller Chapman	June 7, 2021	2LAZ03	0.71
Duncan and Kimberly end up forcing the family back home from going to the movies after getting into a fight. After a late night brawl, Jack and Annie have no choice, but to send them to therapy camp to sort out their differences. This opens up more time for them to focus more on Jing who has been craving attention. However, Jing begins to feel too coddled by them and vents her frustration to Duncan's friends. Meanwhile at camp, Duncan and Kimberly refuse to get along, but discover that if they do not change their ways, they will be stuck there indefinitely. They feign loving each other, but after they graduate, they fight over a zipline and get lost in the woods. They finally come to terms with their relationship in a cave, but get chased by a feral moose. They are rescued by the camp counselor, Douglas who is later revealed to have defeated it. Eventually, Jack and Annie begin to miss Duncan and Kimberly's fighting and Jing convinces them to go and get them back. Upon retrieval, they are happy to see them getting along much better until they get home.
16	5	"Party Like a Rocket Star"	Jake Hollander	Ava Tramer & John Viener	June 14, 2021	1LAZ12	0.64
Duncan and his friends try to become the next viral sensation so that they can be rich. They are approached by Daryl Chrisakowski, senior VP of Stroke-a-Cola to make a new video. They settle on building a rocket car using the cola and breath mints to power it. Meanwhile, Kimberly and her friend Claire loathe the fact that they are not at a party across the street, so Jack and Annie trick the kids into coming over to their house while Jing goes to hang out with the boring Bradley. Kimberly tricks her parents into leaving, which causes the kids to party unsupervised. Kimberly tries to calm everyone to no avail while Claire decides to try a peanut, despite her allergy. Duncan's rocket car works as he rides through Oakdale while Jack and Annie race home. Eventually, everyone comes together as a helicopter crashes as the result of the explosion. Daryl decides to make Claire a star due to her near death experience, while Kimberly receives adoration, but swiftly loses it. Duncan and Kimberly agree that fame is boring as the parents complain about the mess.
17	6	"Annie Oakie"	Anne Walker Farrell	Teleplay by : Julie Thacker Scully & John Viener; Story by : Anthony Gioe & Nick Mandernach	June 21, 2021	1LAZ13	0.75
Annie awakens the family so that they can hear the news that she has been nominated for an Oakie Award, an award that goes to the best civil servant in town. Annie launches a campaign to win and spots a vehicle with no license plate and boots it. She learns after the fact that the vehicle belongs to Mayor Jen who threatens Annie and asks her to remove the boot. Annie refuses and Jen uses her power to make the Harrises life a living hell. Eventually, they are forced to live in Duncan's abandoned trailer hangout, much to everyone's consternation. Jen finally offers Annie a win for the Oakie Award and a trip to a water park. Annie takes the deal and wins the award. While at the water park, Jing attempts to bribe an employee which gives Annie great guilt and ends their trip early. They return to Oakdale where Annie publicly admits to being a sham and tries to pass the award off, but all the other nominees admit similar faults. Duncan suggests that his teacher Mr. Mitch get the award as he works several jobs besides teaching and everyone agrees.
18	7	"That Jing You Do"	Anne Walker Farrell	Mike Scully & Julie Thacker Scully	June 28, 2021	2LAZ05	0.64
While at a bookstore, a children's performer leaves and Jing convinces Jack to play for the other kids with her accompanying him. They end up becoming well liked and Annie and Kimberly manage the two into hosting gigs at various children's parties. Meanwhile, Duncan and his friends find a massage couch that they want to buy, but need $200 for. At Mr. Mitch's suggestion, they recharge scooters to earn money, but fail to earn enough in a reasonable amount of time. They recruit Mr. Mitch to go around Oakdale to steal and charge as many scooters as they can. Eventually, Jack and Jing begin to suffer from band drama just as they book a gig at Ticklepalooza. Annie convinces the two to be professional and perform, but begin having a spat on stage. Duncan and his friends charge the scooters, but the outlet Bex uses causes them to explode and blow the power out across town. Jack and Jing make up during the blackout and retire from show business. Duncan and his friends make their own massage chair and get attacked by robot dogs they ran afoul of earlier.
19	8	"Crimes and Misters Demean Her"	Jake Hollander	Ava Tramer & Andrew Lee	July 12, 2021	2LAZ06	0.65
Jack is coaching Jing's soccer team, but they are terrible due to his lax coaching. When Duncan comes with a bad report, Jack begins yelling at him, which motivates the team to play better. Meanwhile, Annie takes Kimberly to work and she ends up liking her job. However, the Pad Boys, a group of higher ranking parking lieutenants, arrive and reveal that Annie is highly submissive to them. Kimberly tries to get her to stand up for herself, even though she ends up having dinner with Sandra, one of the Pad Boys' wives. Kimberly finally talks some sense into Annie as they learn that the infamous Space Jammer plans to mess with an upcoming soccer game. Duncan cannot make Jack angry after having an outburst at Papa Mom's, but the team learns that Jack just needs to have an aggressive voice for them to play better. Annie learns that Sandra is the Space Jammer and uses her latest ploy to divorce her husband before escaping. The Pad Boys finally thank Annie and officially promote her as one of them, much to her and Kimberly's joy.
20	9	"Stan in the Place Where You Live"	Marius Alecse	John Viener	July 19, 2021	2LAZ07	0.71
After the Harrises avoid cleaning the attic, Annie tells Duncan to take the PSAT on Saturday, but he does not want to, despite his friends wanting to. He is told that he will end up like his Uncle Stan if he does not take it. Stan shows up, much to Annie's consternation, and he promises to take Duncan to school to take the test. Believing that Stan's life is so much better than his, Duncan decides to hang out with him for the day. After coming home, Mr. Mitch arrives to tell the family that Duncan did not take the test. Duncan angrily tells his family that he does not want to go to college and instead live with Stan, which Annie allows. Duncan quickly learns that his life is not great and misses home. Thinking that Annie was harsh, Jack, Jing and Kimberly decide to clean the attic. Duncan is used as a sideshow attraction to earn money, but when he accidentally blabs that it is a scam, he calls Annie who arrives and reveals that everyone in town, including Stan, but not Jack had set up a big con to convince Duncan to stay in school. He thanks his family, except Jack.
21	10	"Off to the Braces"	Corey Barnes	Anthony Gioe & Nick Mandernach	August 16, 2021	2LAZ08	0.62
Kimberly is finally getting her braces off. To get out of waiting, Jack and Duncan head to a "cool" barber shop where the former accidentally gets his ponytail cut off. Kimberly gets the adoring admiration of her peers and is cast in a play where she has to kiss a boy named Marcus while Jack is viewed as being trustworthy by everyone and gets accepted into a yuppie group called the Oak Club. Kimberly prepares her kissing technique, but discovers that Marcus has a cold sore; scaring her. Annie admits to Jack that she no longer finds him attractive because he lost his ponytail. Eventually, the play moves forward and Kimberly demands Claire help her. While putting up a speed bump, Jack gets some convincing from Duncan and his phantom ponytail to re-embrace his inner rockstar and drives his truck off of it. He crashes into the play and swipes off Marcus' cold sore and Annie passionately kisses him. Marcus and Kimberly are about to kiss, but Claire presumptuously drops a sandbag on Kimberly; ruining her teeth and forcing her to wear braces again.
22	11	"Jurannie Park"	Anne Walker Farrell	Story by : Carson Gearan & Sara Scully; Teleplay by : Andrew Lee	August 23, 2021	2LAZ09	0.66
Annie has a bad day at work and ends up getting suspended for a week after an altercation. Mr. Mitch takes her place, but is too lax about the job. Annie finds a small bird, names him Kyle and decides to open her home into a bird sanctuary. Meanwhile, Duncan tries to hit a high branch to impress his friends, Kimberly tries talking to Marcus and Jing tries to perfect a magic trick. The birds end up making their issues worse and they along with Jack try to convince Annie to get rid of the birds. They end up rebelling and they get kicked out of their house. The townsfolk come by to tell them that without Annie's ticketing, Oakdale is in shambles as her job is what increases the revenue and keeps things running. To help the Harrises out, they make it look like it is Winter already and trick the birds into leaving. However, they learn they have been played and attempt to retake the house, but the Harrises close all the doors and Duncan manages to jump onto the roof to close the window; impressing his friends. Annie says goodbye to Kyle as he joins his flock.
23	12	"Witch Day 2"	Jake Hollander	Teleplay by : Jerron Horton; Story by : Julie Thacker Scully & Jerron Horton	August 30, 2021	2LAZ10	0.70
It is Witch Day once again. Jack and Annie take another crack at their yearly tradition to win Huckster, a stuffed animal, Kimberly gets with her coven friends to sell potions, but must look after Jing and Duncan wants to get closer to Mia. He and his friends discover that the haunted house has been shut down, so Yangzi takes them all to an abandoned Circuit City. Duncan tries to impress Mia, but things go wrong and they are forced to leave. Kimberly tells Jing to get lost and the Blood Moon reawakens a tree witch who gives Jing a wand which she uses for her own benefit. Kimberly and her coven discover this and they meet the tree witch, but accidentally release all the hung witches from the tree and cause havoc, though they allow Jack and Annie to finally win Huckster. As the witches encircle the townsfolk, Kimberly and Jing reaffirm their sisterly bond and Duncan suggests that the witches simply move into the Circuit City, which they happily do. Mia allows Duncan to put his arm around her, but he gets a cramp, so she puts her arm around him.

=== Season 3 (2022) ===
No. overall	No. in season	Title	Directed by	Written by	Original release date	Prod. code	U.S. viewers (millions)
Fox
24	1	"Gamer vs. Gamer"	Corey Barnes	Nick Mandernach & Anthony Gioe	May 1, 2022	2LAZ12	0.57
Duncan and his friends want to get a shout out from game streamer Slayer after a classmate of theirs gets one for donating to his charity. As they watch the stream, Duncan uses his emergency credit card to donate $10. However due to the sticky keyboard, he ends up donating $10,000 instead; resulting in Slayer inviting Duncan and his friends to his island. Meanwhile, Jack and Annie show Jing and Kimberly their photo album, but accidentally reveal that they were arrested for the weekend in their youth after publicly defacing a music store. Kimberly and Jing find holes in the story and Annie reveals that she ratted Jack out so that she could save her future career. She apologizes by revealing that she waited for him. Slayer reveals that he knew that Duncan did not have the money and hunts him and his friends. He later admits that he never intended to kill them and that his actions actually got more donations. He gives Duncan a new keyboard and everyone parties away on the island. Duncan returns home with a new puppy for the family.
25	2	"Clothes and Dagger"	Clint Bond	Teleplay by : Aseem Batra; Story by : Amy Poehler & Aseem Batra	May 8, 2022	3LAZ02	0.44
After getting forcibly dragged to go clothes shopping by Annie, Duncan finds a switch blade and begins playing with it. Jack and Annie reluctantly let him keep it, but when he goes to see his friends, they all tell him that he is incapable of using a knife because he is the "goofball" of the group and Wolf is the "alpha". However, after getting attacked by geese, Duncan saves the day and becomes the new alpha of the group; concerning Wolf. Meanwhile, Kimberly reveals to Jack and Annie that their clothes are a hot commodity and can sell for thousands of dollars. While happy at first, they discover that their clothing is being bought by hipsters and they are considered "schlubs". They crash a hipster gathering and rile up the crowd who attack them. Duncan and Wolf get into an argument and decide to fight one another. However, neither are capable of doing so due to their friendship. This angers the crowd who attacks them. Duncan, Wolf, Jack and Annie all end up in the hospital, with Annie upset that Duncan ripped his pants again.
26	3	"(Work) Marriage Story"	Frank Marino	Aaron Lee	May 15, 2022	3LAZ01	0.60
Jack is disappointed to learn that Annie connects with her "work husband" Garrett better than him. Feeling that he is being pushed out of their relationship, Jack decides to call Garrett's husband Bryce, an airline pilot, and hang out with him. The two of them end up bonding and become good friends. Meanwhile, Mr. Mitch becomes the new vice principal after the previous one is let go for angrily harassing Bex. Duncan and his friends are happy, but Mr. Mitch becomes stricter on them. When he needs to take a drug test, Duncan and his friends blackmail him into giving them carte blanche. This results in them getting stuck on the roof of the school during a thunder storm. Mr. Mitch rescues them, but the principal demotes him as punishment. The Harrises invite Garrett and Bryce over where Jack inadvertently reveals his true motives; causing Garrett and Bryce to leave. Annie tells Jack that he simply needs friends and Jack rushes to the airport to apologize to Bryce; deciding to fly away with him for fun.
27	4	"Plumbdog Millionaire"	Anne Walker Farrell	Teleplay by : Sara Scully & Ava Tramer; Story by : John Viener	May 22, 2022	2LAZ13	0.64
Duncan invites Mia over to watch a movie with his family. When an ad for the Rug Lord comes up, Duncan suggests that Jack make a commercial to drum up business. Jack portrays a plumber that fights the Gunkwad, played by Duncan, and the commercial blows up. Soon, the Harrises start earning more money with Duncan using his newfound fame as the Gunkwad in an effort to impress Mia. However, Jack and Duncan seem more interested in gaining adoration from fans and Mia and the rest of the Harrises call them out on having turned into jerks. When filming the next commercial, Duncan and Jack meet the Rug Lord who reveals that his family left him because of his newfound success. Duncan and Jack use the opportunity to make a commercial that has them apologize for standing up their respective significant others. Duncan celebrates by tossing his Gunkwad costume into the fire, which causes everyone to hallucinate. Duncan, his friends and Mr. Mitch have a final ride in a boat that Jack had earlier bought.
28	5	"Annie v. Fun"	Marius Alecse	Anthony Gioe & Nick Mandernach	June 5, 2022	3LAZ03	0.46
Duncan and Kimberly convince Jing to hold her fifth birthday party at Teen Zone. Everyone has fun except Annie, who accuses the entertainment place of price gouging, and Duncan who is humiliated in the indoor skydive when he vomits all over. Annie takes a stand and drags Jing away from laser tag and Kimberly from getting close to Wolf. Annie is commended by her neighbors for sticking to her principles and they hold an anonymous meeting against all the businesses that have gouged them in the past. At school, Duncan is teased and Mia suggests going back to Teen Zone to face his fears. When Jing is ostracized at school, Jack takes her, her friends and Kimberly back to Teen Zone for a do-over. Duncan joins Annie and her group in releasing rats at Teen Zone for revenge. When they arrive, Jack convinces Annie that principles are fine, but that she should acknowledge when her kids need fun and she relents. The group releases the rats anyway while Duncan and Mia are skydiving together. Duncan and his friends all get rabies.
29	6	"Throw Momma from the Brain"	Marius Alecse	Teleplay by : Aseem Batra; Story by : Amy Poehler & Aseem Batra	June 5, 2022	2LAZ11	0.47
When Helen goes to visit her sister, the Harrises discover that she has a pool and deck in her backyard and use it for themselves. However, when Annie and Jack decide to go skinny dipping, Duncan accidentally catches his mom naked and becomes traumatized to the point that he will not look her in the face; making her feel terrible. Meanwhile, Jack continues to use the deck to get attention with Mr. Mitch helping with making his deck parties better. Soon, everything gets out of control when too many people show up and the party ends when the deck gets completely destroyed. Duncan gets the idea to go to a memory therapy center and successfully removes the memory, as well as other embarrassing mom memories. This results in him losing any emotional attachment to Annie. In order to reconnect, Duncan is forced to see his mom naked again and regains his lost memories with Annie agreeing to never mention what happened. The Harrises use the same memory therapy on Helen in regards to her deck, but she refuses to stop hitting on Duncan.
30	7	"Dead Stan Walking"	Corey Barnes	John Viener	June 12, 2022	3LAZ04	0.58
After faking another funeral for Stan, Annie believes that she needs to change him for the better and turns his life around. This results in him giving up his scam objects, including a neck brace which Duncan decides to use to get out of gym. His friends also start to use it for their own purposes and they all begin to fight over it, resulting in them all, ironically, getting broken necks for real and needing neck braces. Annie sets up Stan with Helen's niece Jodie, but he ends up going out with Helen instead; grossing the Harrises out. Stan finally breaks down to Annie as she has been controlling him all his life and she relents. Stan proposes to Helen, but before the wedding, Jack and Annie supposedly witness him kissing someone else. They confront him down the aisle, but he reveals that she was his sponsor smelling his breath to make sure he was sober. Helen reveals that she faked the wedding so that her ex, Bert, will get jealous and come back to her. Stan is distraught, but thanks Annie for keeping an eye out for him.
31	8	"She Snoops, She Scores!"	Roy Burdine	Teleplay by : Jerron Horton; Story by : Jerron Horton & Amy Poehler	June 12, 2022	3LAZ05	0.57
Yangzi gets a new phone dubbed "The Distractor" that, true to its name, makes him addicted. Mr. Mitch, Duncan and his friends are forced to lock him away in the abandoned RV for a detox. Meanwhile, Annie forces Kimberly to get a job as a babysitter and is hired by Bradley to babysit him. Bored, she wanders the house and comes across his mother Patricia's therapy files on the residents of Oakdale and shares them with Jack and Annie. When it is revealed that Patricia thinks that Annie is a bad parent, Annie and Kimberly break back into the house to find dirt on Patricia, only to run into Bradley who blackmails them into taking him out to Danny's, a Denny's knockoff, but gets high off of freedom and runs into the night. Yangzi suddenly begins to view real life the way he does his phone and Duncan and his friends chase him. Yangzi and Bradley meet on the top of a cell tower and fall, but are saved by firemen. Patricia still thinks that Annie is a bad parent, but Kimberly comforts her. Yangzi and Jack start seeing Patricia for therapy.
32	9	"Born to Run (A Small Business)"	Clint Bond	Mike Scully	June 19, 2022	3LAZ06	0.50
Jack is surprised to find that Ronnie D's Axe Hole is still open. As he reminisces with Ronnie D, he accidentally injures his idol and he is convinced to buy the Axe Hole while he recuperates at his home. Jack has Kimberly help inside while Duncan becomes a sign spinner. Mr. Mitch teaches him how to spin signs properly so that he can get "honks". However, Mr. Mitch takes over his turf and Duncan challenges him to a sign spin-off. Just as Ronnie D comes to the realization that he enjoys family life, Jack solemnly realizes that young people are not interested in classic rock and he is hit with an IRS notice of $200,000. Ronnie D admits that he hated running the store as he barely made any money and Jack suggests that they create an accident so that the insurance can cover it. They put on a show with rigged fireworks, but the crowd loves it and they back out. However, Duncan and Mr. Mitch's sign spinning ends up setting the building on fire. Kimberly shows an interest in the guitar and Wolf starts a podcast with the equipment he bought from Jack.
33	10	"Moneyballs"	Marius Alecse	Andrew Lee	June 26, 2022	3LAZ07	0.52
While Duncan secretly holds a house party at home, the rest of the Harrises take Dick out to eat with Jack still trying to impress him. They return home to the mess where Dick chastises Jack for going easy on Duncan and he responds by cutting him off from using their credit cards. At the advice of his friends, Duncan gets a job at Hal's hardware store and uses his newfound income to buy things for the family, as well as pay Kimberly and Jing to be maids and talk with British accents. When Duncan realizes that Jack is using his new job in another effort to impress Dick, Duncan takes on a personality shift and starts to act harsh towards Jack and Annie, just like Dick. Angered, Jack and Duncan have a fight on the roof and Annie calls Dick to come and stop them. He gets them to admit that they care about one another and Dick finally shows some approval towards Jack. They fall through the roof, but the family decides to keep the hole to see the stars. When Dick complains on the toilet, Jack shuts the door with a nail gun.
Hulu
34	11	"The Young and the Bexless"	Corey Barnes	Sara Scully	October 18, 2022 (Hulu)	3LAZ08	N/A
Bex is once again up to be voted class clown at Oakdale high, but is suddenly dethroned by footballer Corey. Angered over losing, she signs up to be a student monitor so as to ensure that no one has fun or laughs anymore at the school. Meanwhile, Jack and Annie take a break from binging to get ice cream, only to discover that their ice cream place has been turned into a face lift office. They agree to look younger and discover the benefits of having youth, leaving the kids to their own devices. Bex continues to rule the school with an iron fist, but her ruling becomes bullying during the big football game. When Kimberly and Jing do their usual rubbing in on Duncan, Bex has a sudden epiphany and resumes her clownish ways by pantsing Corey. Jack and Annie get invited to a frat house and have fun, but their face lift suddenly wears away and everyone sees their true age. They are kicked out, but come to accept growing old together. Later, Bex ridicules Kimberly and Jing when they become her joke writers.
35	12	"Witch Day 3"	Roy Burdine	Julie Thacker Scully	October 18, 2022 (Hulu)	3LAZ09	N/A
It is Witch Day again and the Harrises are bored with this year's festivities. Duncan and his friends are unimpressed with Mr. Mitch's booth, but upon returning to their hangout, they get a message from a psycho demanding that they get him $200 worth of gift cards from Cheesecake Warehouse. They deliver it to a driver who takes them out of town, only for them to get chased by him into a cornfield. The Harrises turn their house into a haunted attraction, but the use of a real tombstone results in the ghost of Annie's ancestor Winifred to suddenly show up. At first the meeting is great, but Winifred begins to flirt with Jack and tries to steal his soul. She possesses a doll and Kimberly calls the spirit of Jack's ancestor Jackariah. The two attempt to kill Jack, but the family locks the two in the attic. Duncan and his friends find Mr. Mitch about to be killed and Duncan reveals his embarrassing video of himself asking Mia to the movies. Mr. Mitch and Mia reveal they planned the night's events and admit it was fun.
36	13	"The Dudliest Catch"	Clint Bond	Anthony Gioe & Nick Mandernach	October 18, 2022 (Hulu)	3LAZ10	N/A
Jack and Annie are tired of watching the same show with Jing and introduce her to Huxster, a rude talking cat. Influenced by him, Jing proceeds to make rude and insulting comments to people. Meanwhile, Duncan and his friends attend the prom to "goof", but end up enjoying it. When Mia kisses Duncan for a photo, he is convinced that she is his girlfriend, but when she appears indifferent the next day, he converses with his parents and they tell him that the needs to make a grand gesture. He asks her out in front of everyone and she turns him down while running away. Duncan becomes a fisherman to get away. After Kimberly uses Jing to get back at some girls, Jack and Annie take to two to see Huxster's creator and voice actor who insults Jing to the point that she stops idolizing him. Duncan tells the fishermen his situation and they convince him to go back to Mia. She tells him that she is not ready for a fully committed relationship, but that they can still have "one-on-one hang[s]", which Duncan accepts.
37	14	"The Pursuit of Daddyness"	Marius Alecse	Aseem Batra	October 18, 2022 (Hulu)	3LAZ11	N/A
Jack and Annie have dinner with Bryce and Garrett where the latter reveals that he wants kids. Bryce, who is reluctant, agrees to have a ride along with Jack so as to understand what it is like being a parent. Annie finally decides to teach Duncan how to take care of himself and he learns that he likes to cook and perform other house economic duties. His friends are at first impressed, but quickly get annoyed at his behavior and convince Annie to revert him back to his old self. Jack and Bryce try to help Kimberly with dealing with the ABC girls, the meanest clique at her school. At first, they manage to get her to join her group, but when they insist on mean bullying, Kimberly leaves them. They discover that they have a bully schedule and manage to block their cruel pranks at every turn. The ABC girls manage to get Jack and Bryce arrested, but use fake IDs to get out of them. Kimberly makes new friends, Garrett and Bryce adopt a baby and Jack learns how to fly a plane from Bryce, much to everyone's horror.
38	15	"The Sharent Trap"	Corey Barnes	Aaron Lee	October 18, 2022 (Hulu)	3LAZ12	N/A
Duncan gets humiliated at mini-golf when Jack and Annie post an embarrassing video of him getting caught up in the windmill online. Mia tells him about "sharenting" and he, Kimberly and Jing tell their parents to get a life. This results in Jack and Annie buying a motorcycle and hitting the road where they meet a couple who lead Hell's Boomers and try and join their ranks. Duncan and Kimberly take Jing to her school play of Goldilocks and the Three Bears. Unimpressed with the production, Duncan and Kimberly take over, give Jing the lead role of Baby Bear and reduce the rest of the kids to playing trees. The new play is a psychological drama that ends up winning over the parents. Jack and Annie are about to join Hell's Boomers when they are asked to set fire to an RV with a couple inside. They panic and flee along with the RV family and head home. The kids realize that they crave their parents sharing their memories online and while Jack and Annie miss the play, they take a photo of the kids and ride off together.
39	16	"Ditch Mitch or Die Trying"	Roy Burdine	Jerron Horton	October 18, 2022 (Hulu)	3LAZ13	N/A
Mr. Mitch is depressed after his girlfriend dumps him following a proposal. When Duncan tells his parents, they decide to befriend Mr. Mitch so that he can get back onto his feet. They take him bowling and he ends up enjoying himself. The next day at school, Mr. Mitch proceeds to shower Duncan with praise and treat him better than the other kids, much to their chagrin. Meanwhile, Kimberly and Jing are tasked with looking after Mavis, Mr. Mitch's dog, and take her for walk. After she defecates, Mayor Jen arrives and forces the girls to pick up her stool. Grossed out, they both run away as Jen and her team C.R.A.P. chase after the girls. Mr. Mitch becomes too clingy and Jack and Annie break things off with him. He becomes inconsolable and yells at the kids before leaving. When they go to check on him, they think he is about to commit suicide off a bridge, but it turns out he was bungee jumping as a way of embracing his independence. He rescues Kimberly and Jing by picking up Mavis' poop on his own and invites the Harrises to Spring Break.

== Production ==
On August 17, 2017, it was reported that Fox had ordered a script and pilot presentation for an animated comedy developed by Amy Poehler and written by Poehler, Mike Scully, and Julie Scully.

On October 26, 2018, it was announced that the network had ordered a 13-episode series, with featured voices Poehler, Rashida Jones, and Wiz Khalifa. On May 8, 2019, Ty Burrell was announced as a series regular, and on June 6, 2019, Riki Lindhome was announced as a regular.

The series was executive produced by Poehler through Paper Kite Productions, the Scullys through Scullys, and Dave Becky through 3 Arts Entertainment. Production companies also involved with the series include Universal Television, Fox Entertainment, and 20th Television Animation (20th Television in seasons 1–2). The show was animated by Fox's Bento Box Entertainment.

In April 2020, the series joined the rest of Fox's Animation Domination lineup in a partnership with Caffeine for the AniDom Beyond Show, a recap series hosted by Andy Richter. The hour-long program featured interviews with guests and live interactivity with fans online, with recaps for the episodes that aired through April and May. The Duncanville episode aired on April 16, 2020 featuring Mike Scully and his wife Julie Thacker Scully. On May 18, 2020, John Viener joined the series with other writers from the Fox Animation Domination lineup.

On April 6, 2020, the series was renewed for a second season which premiered on May 23, 2021. On July 16, 2020, Jones, Osmanski, and Khalifa were promoted to series regulars for the second season. On April 6, 2021, ahead of the second season premiere, Fox renewed the series for a third season. The third season premiered on May 1, 2022.

On June 30, 2022, Fox cancelled the series after three seasons and pulled the series from the schedule, with the remaining six unaired episodes were burned off and released on October 18, 2022 on Hulu.

== Release ==
The series is available to stream on Hulu, and for purchase on YouTube and iTunes.

In Canada, the series aired on Citytv, airing new episodes in simulcast with Fox.

On November 24, 2019, NBCUniversal Global Distribution announced the series was picked up for broadcast in Australia on the Nine Network and debuted on June 4, 2020 on 9Go!. However though, season 2 moved to Nine's free streaming on demand service 9Now in September 2022.

On January 14, 2020, the series was picked up for broadcast in the United Kingdom on Channel 4. It premiered on March 27, 2020, before moving to E4 for season 2, which debuted on October 20, 2021.

The series debuted in Latin America on Fox Channel on August 30, 2020.

In France, the first season is streaming on Amazon Prime Video since November 6, 2020.

In Italy, the series debuted on Italia 1 on January 11, 2021, but was removed from the schedule after only two episodes due to low ratings. However, it was brought back on June 13, 2021, with new episodes airing Saturdays at midnight until July 10 of the same year. As of today, Duncanville is airing Mondays on Italia 2 starting September 5 with reruns the next day.

In Poland, the series debuted on Fox Comedy on February 6, 2021.

In Latin America the show was available to stream on Star+. It eventually relocated to Disney+ from July 2024 via the Star content hub following Star+ merging into Disney+ in Latin America.

== Reception ==
=== Critical response ===
On Rotten Tomatoes, the series has an approval rating of 91% based on 11 reviews, with an average rating of 6.30/10. The website's critics consensus reads, "Amy Poehler lends her buoyant pipes to dual roles in Duncanville, a modest animated comedy that gets a lot of mileage out of its colorful palette and daydream flourishes." On Metacritic, it has a weighted average score of 64 out of 100 based on 6 reviews, indicating "generally favorable reviews".

Robyn Bahr of The Hollywood Reporter praised the series for its humor, stating it contains smart joke-telling and manages to be pleasant, and complimented the performances of the voice actors, while calling the main character nondescript, stating, "Duncanville is another family-friendly comedy that seems about as connected to today's youth as its Groupon jokes seem relevant to 2020. There's something particularly '90s about this sitcom that might be intended to feel nostalgic, but really comes off as retrograde." Sulgana Misra of The A.V. Club gave "Pilot" a B, found the series funny and entertaining, praised Poehler's charm and the family dynamics of the show, but criticized the main character's lack of interesting motivation. Ben Travers of IndieWire gave the show's first two episodes a B− grade, stated Duncanville has potential despite being a sitcom about a white working-class family, writing, "Filled with good ideas, appealing designs, and a strong cast, the half-hour comedy has enough potential to warrant keeping track of, while we wait to see how its rounded edges are sharpened into a singular vision." Melissa Camacho of Common Sense Media rated the series 3 out of 5 stars, writing, "Duncanville is an animated sitcom about an average teenager living life with his family and friends. It has some sex jokes and crude language, and characters argue and hurl insults. [...] References to things like Twizzlers, Groupon, and Papa John's Pizza are common. Movies, music albums, and characters from a range of popular culture are heavily incorporated into the story, too."

=== Ratings ===
==== Overall ====
Viewership and ratings per season of Duncanville
Season	Timeslot (ET)	Episodes	First aired		Last aired		TV season	Viewership rank	Avg. viewers (millions)
Season	Timeslot (ET)	Episodes	Date	Viewers (millions)	Date	Viewers (millions)	TV season	Viewership rank	Avg. viewers (millions)
1	Sunday 8:30pm	11	February 16, 2020	1.52	May 17, 2020	1.21	2019–20	124	1.30
2	Sunday 8:30pm (1); Sunday 9:30pm (2); Monday 9:30pm (3–5); Monday 9:31pm (6–12)	12	May 23, 2021	0.80	August 30, 2021	0.70	2020–21	N/A	0.69
3	Sunday 7:30pm (1–4); Sunday 9:00pm (5,7,9,10); Sunday 9:30pm (6,8)	10	May 1, 2022	0.57	June 26, 2022	0.52	2021–22	134	0.65

==== Season 1 ====
Viewership and ratings per episode of Duncanville
No.	Title	Air date	Rating (18–49)	Viewers (millions)	DVR (18–49)	DVR viewers (millions)	Total (18–49)	Total viewers (millions)
1	"Pilot"	February 16, 2020	0.5	1.52	0.1	0.28	0.6	1.80
2	"Red Head Redemption"	February 23, 2020	0.5	1.43	0.1	0.20	0.6	1.63
3	"Undacuva Mutha"	March 1, 2020	0.4	1.21	0.1	0.18	0.5	1.39
4	"Witch Day"	March 8, 2020	0.4	1.09	0.1	0.15	0.4	1.24
5	"Fridgy"	March 15, 2020	0.4	1.17	0.1	0.17	0.5	1.34
6	"Sister, Wife"	March 22, 2020	0.4	1.07	0.1	0.18	0.5	1.25
7	"Jack's Pipe Dream"	April 19, 2020	0.4	1.11	0.1	0.10	0.4	1.21
8	"Judge Annie"	April 26, 2020	0.4	0.98	0.1	0.13	0.4	1.10
9	"Free Range Children"	May 3, 2020	0.3	0.95	0.0	0.09	0.4	1.04
10	"Wolf Mother"	May 10, 2020	0.3	0.86	0.1	0.11	0.4	0.97
11	"Classless President"	May 17, 2020	0.4	1.21	0.0	0.09	0.5	1.30

==== Season 2 ====
Viewership and ratings per episode of Duncanville
No.	Title	Air date	Rating (18–49)	Viewers (millions)	DVR (18–49)	DVR viewers (millions)	Total (18–49)	Total viewers (millions)
1	"Das Banana Boot"	May 23, 2021	0.3	0.80	0.0	0.09	0.3	0.90
2	"Duncan's New Word"	May 23, 2021	0.2	0.71	0.0	0.06	0.3	0.77
3	"Who's Vroomin' Who?"	May 31, 2021	0.2	0.74	0.1	0.18	0.3	0.91
4	"Sibling Revelry"	June 7, 2021	0.2	0.71	0.1	0.12	0.3	0.83
5	"Party Like a Rocket Star"	June 14, 2021	0.2	0.64	0.0	0.12	0.2	0.76
6	"Annie Oakie"	June 21, 2021	0.2	0.75	0.0	0.10	0.3	0.85
7	"That Jing You Do"	June 28, 2021	0.2	0.67	0.1	0.13	0.3	0.77
8	"Crimes and Misters Demean Her"	July 12, 2021	0.2	0.65	0.1	0.12	0.3	0.76
9	"Stan in the Place Where You Live"	July 19, 2021	0.2	0.71	0.1	0.12	0.3	0.83
10	"Off to the Braces"	August 16, 2021	0.2	0.62	0.0	0.09	0.2	0.71
11	"Jurannie Park"	August 23, 2021	0.2	0.66	—N/a	—N/a	—N/a	—N/a
12	"Witch Day 2"	August 30, 2021	0.2	0.70	—N/a	—N/a	—N/a	—N/a

==== Season 3 ====
Viewership and ratings per episode of Duncanville
No.	Title	Air date	Rating (18–49)	Viewers (millions)	DVR (18–49)	DVR viewers (millions)	Total (18–49)	Total viewers (millions)
1	"Gamer vs. Gamer"	May 1, 2022	0.2	0.57	TBD	TBD	TBD	TBD
2	"Clothes and Dagger"	May 8, 2022	0.1	0.44	TBD	TBD	TBD	TBD
3	"(Work) Marriage Story"	May 15, 2022	0.2	0.60	TBD	TBD	TBD	TBD
4	"Plumbdog Millionaire"	May 22, 2022	0.2	0.64	TBD	TBD	TBD	TBD
5	"Annie v. Fun"	June 5, 2022	0.1	0.46	TBD	TBD	TBD	TBD
6	"Throw Momma From The Brain"	June 5, 2022	0.1	0.47	TBD	TBD	TBD	TBD
7	"Dead Stan Walking"	June 12, 2022	0.2	0.58	TBD	TBD	TBD	TBD
8	"She Snoops, She Scores!"	June 12, 2022	0.2	0.57	TBD	TBD	TBD	TBD
9	"Born to Run (A Small Business)"	June 19, 2022	0.1	0.50	TBD	TBD	TBD	TBD
10	"Moneyballs"	June 26, 2022	0.1	0.52	TBD	TBD	TBD	TBD

=== Accolades ===
Year	Award	Category	Recipient(s)	Result	Ref.
2021	Kidscreen Awards	Best New Series (Tweens/Teens programming)	Amy Poehler, Mike Scully, 20th Television, Universal Television, Fox Entertainment	Nominated	
2021	Webby Awards	Advertising, Media & PR - Best Use of Social Media	Wiz Khalifa, Fox Entertainment, Bento Box Entertainment	Won	
