= A Place in Hell =

- Teaser poster with original release date
- Directed by: Chloe Domont
- Written by: Chloe Domont
- Produced by: Leopold Hughes; Ben LeClair
- Starring: Michelle Williams; Daisy Edgar-Jones; Andrew Scott; Danny Huston; Arturo Castro; Rob Yang; Kyle Mooney
- Cinematography: Menno Mans
- Production companies: Neon; Republic Pictures; MRC; T-Street
- Distributed by: Neon (United States); Republic Pictures (International; through Paramount Pictures)
- Release date: April 23, 2027
- Running time: 110 minutes
- Country: United States
- Language: English

A Place in Hell is an upcoming American thriller film written and directed by Chloe Domont and starring Michelle Williams, Daisy Edgar-Jones, and Andrew Scott.

== Premise ==
The plot explores the feud between a criminal defense attorney and the younger lawyer brought in to replace her, thwarting the former's ambitions.

== Cast ==
- Michelle Williams
- Daisy Edgar-Jones as Cate Fine
- Andrew Scott
- Danny Huston
- Arturo Castro
- Rob Yang
- Kyle Mooney
- Dani Oliveros
- Esther McGregor

== Production ==
It was announced in February 2025 that Chloe Domont had set her next project, with Michelle Williams and Daisy Edgar-Jones cast to star. In May 2025, it was reported that filming had begun in New York and New Jersey, with Danny Huston also being part of the cast. In June 2025, Andrew Scott joined the cast. By July 2025, principal photography had concluded, with Neon joining the film as a financier and domestic distributor and co-financier Republic Pictures handling international territories. The same month, it was reported Arturo Castro, Kyle Mooney, Dani Oliveros, and Esther McGregor were part of the cast.

== Release ==
A Place in Hell was originally scheduled for release on December 25, 2026. However, in July 2026, Neon pushed the film's release date to April 23, 2027, likely to help coordinate a day-and-date release worldwide.
