= Fair Play (2023 film) =

Film by Chloe Domont

- Theatrical release poster
- Directed by: Chloe Domont
- Written by: Chloe Domont
- Produced by: Tim White; Trevor White; Allan Mandelbaum; Leopold Hughes; Ben LeClair
- Starring: Phoebe Dynevor; Alden Ehrenreich; Eddie Marsan; Rich Sommer
- Cinematography: Menno Mans
- Edited by: Franklin Peterson
- Music by: Brian McOmber
- Production companies: T-Street; Star Thrower Entertainment
- Distributed by: Netflix
- Release dates: January 20, 2023 (Sundance); September 29, 2023 (United States)
- Running time: 113 minutes
- Country: United States
- Language: English

Fair Play is a 2023 American erotic psychological thriller film written and directed by Chloe Domont in her feature directorial debut. Starring Phoebe Dynevor, Alden Ehrenreich, Eddie Marsan, and Rich Sommer, the film focuses on a young couple whose relationship begins to unravel following an unexpected promotion at a cutthroat hedge fund firm. Rian Johnson was an executive producer on the film.

Fair Play premiered at the Sundance Film Festival on January 20, 2023, and was released in select theaters on September 29, before its streaming release by Netflix on October 6. The film received positive reviews from critics.

== Plot ==
Emily Meyers and Luke Edmunds, analysts at the cutthroat Manhattan hedge fund One Crest Capital, are in a secret passionate relationship, unbeknownst to their co-workers. He proposes to her while at his brother's wedding and, after a moment's hesitation, she happily accepts. The next day, one of the company's portfolio managers is fired. Emily tells Luke she overheard her colleagues mention that Luke was being considered as a replacement and they celebrate that night. At a late-night meeting with Campbell, the firm's CEO, she learns she will be receiving the promotion. Emily reluctantly breaks the news to Luke, but he expresses his support.

As Emily settles into her new job, Luke's resentment over not being promoted becomes apparent, leading to tensions in their relationship. Luke becomes consumed with the work of a self-help guru coaching people on how to assert themselves in the workplace. When Emily questions his spending $3,000 on the course, Luke suggests she could benefit from becoming more assertive, to which she becomes defensive. He rebuffs her attempts to initiate sex and goes to bed.

While out for drinks with Campbell and Paul, a senior executive at the fund, Emily learns that Campbell wants to get rid of Luke, considering him ineffectual. She attempts to advocate more for Luke in the workplace, but it backfires when he makes a poor trading call that loses the company $15 million, leading to Campbell insulting her. Luke attempts to recover by feeding Emily insider information confirming the alleged collapse of a company whose stock the fund can short. Concerned about the trade being illegal, she recommends Campbell short another company, which works. When the short sale is closed, Emily receives a $575,000 commission cheque.

Emily considers celebrating her success with Luke, who is in her office after hours to discuss strategies for future trades but opts to go to a strip club with her male co-workers. She comes home intoxicated while he, after seeing the cheque, has no interest in having sex with her. When another portfolio manager is fired the next day, Luke wants Emily to recommend him for the role, but she hints Campbell is not interested in promoting him. He goes to Campbell's office and makes an elaborate speech pledging his loyalty to him, only to learn Campbell has already hired a new portfolio manager.

That night, Emily learns that her mother had planned a surprise engagement party for them that Friday. A drunken Luke accuses her of stealing his job, but she reveals Campbell wanted to fire him, leading him to storm out. A few days later, while Emily, Campbell, and Paul pitch to overseas investors, Luke barges into the conference room intoxicated and causes a scene, berating Campbell for denying him a promotion and revealing his relationship with Emily, which has violated company policy since her promotion.

An infuriated Emily is unable to reach Luke over the phone, only to find him at the engagement party. They argue in front of their families, and she smashes a bottle on Luke's head when he suggests she had traded sexual favors for the promotion. Emily retreats to a bathroom where Luke finds her; the two get into a heated argument that quickly escalates into Luke raping Emily. During this, he slams her forward twice, causing her to bash her face against the bathroom counter. Emily tells Luke to stop, but he does not. The next morning, to protect her job, she tells Campbell that she was being stalked by Luke and they were never in a relationship. Campbell essentially tells her to leave her personal life out of the office and says that "blame and accountability" are irrelevant, advising her to simply move on.

Emily returns home to find Luke there, having packed up his belongings and planning to move in with his brother. Infuriated by his nonchalant attitude and demanding an apology for raping her, she threatens him with a knife. Emily attacks Luke with the knife until he apologizes and breaks down crying. Once he sincerely begs for her forgiveness, she orders him to leave before dropping the knife and smiling.

== Cast ==
- Phoebe Dynevor as Emily Meyers
- Alden Ehrenreich as Luke Edmunds
- Eddie Marsan as Campbell
- Rich Sommer as Paul
- Sebastian de Souza as Rory
- Sia Alipour as Arjun
- Brandon Bassir as Dax
- Geraldine Somerville as Emily's mother
- Patrick Fischler as Robert Bynes

== Production ==
The film was announced in December 2021, with Chloe Domont writing and directing, and Alden Ehrenreich and Phoebe Dynevor set to star in the film. Production began in January 2022 in Serbia. In February, Sebastian de Souza, Eddie Marsan and Rich Sommer joined the cast.Fairplay Game

== Release ==
Fair Play was released in select theaters on September 29, 2023, before streaming on Netflix on October 6, 2023. The film's streaming release was originally scheduled for October 13, before it was moved up.

The film premiered at the Sundance Film Festival on January 20, 2023. Shortly after, Netflix acquired distribution rights to the film, after a bidding war between at least seven companies including Searchlight Pictures and Neon, for $20 million. It had its international premiere at the 48th Toronto International Film Festival on September 11, 2023.

For its European premiere, the film was shown in the Feature Film Competition section of the 19th Zurich Film Festival in late September 2023.

== Reception ==
=== Critical response ===
On the review aggregator website Rotten Tomatoes, 86% of 235 critics' reviews are positive, with an average rating of 7.4/10. The website's consensus reads: "With assured style that's at times reminiscent of the best '90s nail-biting thrillers, Fair Play juxtaposes premarital disharmony with greed and gender politics in the cutthroat finance world." Metacritic, which uses a weighted average, assigned the film a score of 73 out of 100, based on 47 critics, indicating "generally favorable" reviews.

In his review for Variety, Owen Gleiberman lauded Domont's screenplay and direction, as well the cast performances, writing that "Fair Play, while full of sex, money, corporate backstabbing, and a lot of other things that are fun to watch, really is a good little movie." Describing it as a "steamy, razor-wired, barking-mad movie" in his review for IndieWire, Ryan Lattanzio assigned the film a grade of A− and praised the screenplay and cast performances (particularly Ehrenreich's). Kevin Maher of The Times gave it a score of four out of five, stating: "There's something bracingly modern yet deliberately old-fashioned about this guilty pleasure thriller set in the aspirational world of Manhattan high finance."

=== Accolades ===
Award	Date of ceremony	Category	Recipient(s)	Result	Ref.
Sundance Film Festival	January 27, 2023	Grand Jury Prize – Dramatic	Fair Play	Nominated	
Zurich Film Festival	October 8, 2023	Best International Feature Film	Fair Play	Nominated	
Indiana Film Journalists Association	December 18, 2023	Best Picture	Fair Play	Nominated	
Indiana Film Journalists Association	December 18, 2023	Best Original Screenplay	Chloe Domont	Nominated	
Indiana Film Journalists Association	December 18, 2023	Best Lead Performance	Phoebe Dynevor	Nominated	
Indiana Film Journalists Association	December 18, 2023	Best Editing	Franklin Peterson	Nominated	
Indiana Film Journalists Association	December 18, 2023	Breakout of the Year	Chloe Domont	Nominated	
Astra Film and Creative Awards	January 6, 2024	Best First Feature	Chloe Domont	Nominated	
