= Chloe Domont =

American screenwriter and director (born 1987)

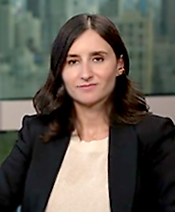
- Domont in 2023
- Born: September 2, 1987 (age 39)
- Education: New York University
- Occupations: Television and film director Screenwriter

Chloe Domont (born September 2, 1987) is an American television and film writer and director, best known for her 2023 film directorial debut, Fair Play, an erotic thriller about gender dynamics in the workplace.

== Early life and education ==
She is from Los Angeles. Her father, a cinephile, is credited for developing her love of film. Initially wanting to be a screenwriter, she made short films in high school. She attended NYU's Tisch School of the Arts, graduating with a BFA in film and television. At NYU she transitioned to directing.

== Directing career ==
After graduation she directed commercials and wrote for short films. A chance meeting with Julian Farino led to a writers' assistant position on Ballers. Farino found her "monumentally overqualified," but still eager to learn with "an intensity of purpose." She advanced to the writers' room and then creator Steve Levinson gave her a chance to direct an episode, her first big break. By 2017 she had steady television work, directing and writing for shows including Ballers, Suits and Billions.

Her debut film, Fair Play, which she wrote and directed, was personal for her and based on her life experiences. Her experience as the only woman in the Ballers writers' room is described as life changing. She felt that she had to "act like one of the boys," or lose her seat at the table. Also, she found that as she became more successful the men she dated became insecure. Domont set out to make an "exploration of that most exquisitely fragile of constructs—the male ego." The movie was felt to specifically speak to the #MeToo era. She used the genre of erotic thriller to show the ways women are forced to play ugly to survive and to demonstrate the dangers of male inferiority and fragility. The film premiered at the 2023 Sundance Film Festival to a "rapturous response." Netflix won a distribution bidding war for $20 million. The theatre release was in September 2023. To be able to recreate the New York ambience that she envisioned, she went to Serbia to shoot; she had been warned that doing so would be "career suicide." The film went on to score 85% on Rotten Tomatoes.

As a filmmaker, she looks to create conversation and debate with films that shock and push the envelope; manipulate and do something different with a genre; "and, ultimately have something really piercing to say at the end."

== Filmography ==
Television

| Year | Title | Notes |
|---|---|---|
| 2017–2018 | Shooter | 2 episodes |
| 2017–2019 | Ballers | 7 episodes |
| 2019 | Suits | 1 episode |
| 2020 | Star Trek: Discovery | 1 episode |
| 2021 | Clarice | 2 episodes |
| 2022 | Billions | 2 episodes |

Feature film

| Year | Title | Director | Writer | Producer |
|---|---|---|---|---|
| 2023 | Fair Play | Yes | Yes | Executive |
| 2027 | A Place in Hell | Yes | Yes | No |
