= Digital Remedy =

American advertising technology company

- Formerly: CPX Interactive, CPXi
- Company type: Privately held company
- Industry: Advertising technology
- Founded: 2000; 26 years ago
- Founder: Michael Seiman
- Headquarters: New York City, United States
- Number of locations: 3 (New York City, New Orleans, Denver)
- Area served: United States
- Key people: Michael Seiman, CEO, Founder, Board Member
- Products: Digital advertising analysis, online advertising
- Website: www.digitalremedy.com

Digital Remedy (formerly known as CPX Interactive) is an American digital media execution and technology company based in New York. The company was founded in 2000 by Michael Seiman who has been CEO since its inception. In 2015, the company was ranked by Forbes as 69th in America's Most Promising Companies.

== History ==
Digital Remedy- formerly CPXi was founded in 2000. It has maintained distinct divisions that evolved in parallel, creating capabilities to meet the challenges faced by marketers, publishers, and influencers, and growing the company to serve its clients. In 2000, Mike Seiman, Digital Remedy CEO and chairman, founded BUDs Inc. while a college student studying computer science at Hofstra University in New York.

In 2005, the company rebranded as CPX Interactive (also called CPXi), paying homage to cost per "x" price modeling.

In 2011, the company established AppNexus partnership; David Zapletal, Digital Remedy EVP Media Optimization, joins the Board of Directors. In 2012, it launched Hatched.at, a lab for innovating new digital products and services and bRealTime, offering programmatic solutions for both supply- and demand-side partners.

In 2013, CPX Interactive rebrands to CPXi and acquires AdReady, a Seattle-based digital media execution partner, providing advertisers and publishers with platform-based services to deliver cross-channel solutions against campaign and performance goals.

In 2014, the company receives $26m in funding from the Business Development Corporation of America (BDCA); CPXi Asia begins as a joint venture in APAC; and Consumed Media- a content production house that developed unique content and engagement strategies for advertisers, publishers, and social influencers- launches.

In 2016, CPXi divests bRealTime for $48.5m; repays the BDCA loan in full; refinances with Gibraltar Capital for $6m; acquires SpinMedia Entertainment Sites; and ad industry veteran, Tiffany Coletti Kaisers joins the company as EVP Marketing.

In 2017, CPXi rebrands as Digital Remedy;

== AdReady platform ==
AdReady is a full-service ad-tech platform designed to move campaigns from the initial RFP and planning stages, through to IO management and trafficking, and finally onto insights, reporting, and renewal. Aids users in media planning, IO and campaign management, omnichannel ad ops execution, multichannel inventory access, data collection and crunching, custom reporting, insights, actions, optimizations, renewals, and campaign expansions.

== Flip ==
An Over-the-Top advertising platform that delivers full-funnel results, attribution, and Return on Advertising Spend (ROAS) tracking for marketers. Built to help brand marketers, agencies, and ad buyers to accurately measure OTT campaign effectiveness and CPA against KPIs in the streaming TV industry. The platform provides a dashboard to show OTT buyers in real time which campaigns are working across which devices, publishers, demographics, and channels. The Flip platform was named the Best New TV/Streaming Ad Sales Program or Product in the 2021 Digiday Video & TV Awards.

== Digital Venture Tech Challenge ==
Digital Remedy partners with Hofstra University for an annual $100,000 student business-plan contest, formerly known as the Hofstra-CPXi Venture Challenge. The contest began in 2013 and awarded the first place student $12,000 in prize money and $30,000 worth of in-kind services from Digital Remedy. Runner ups receive $6,000 and $15,000 worth of in-kind services, and third place winners receive a $3,500 prize and $5,000 worth of in-kind services.
