= List of awards and nominations received by Family Guy =

Family Guy awards and nominations
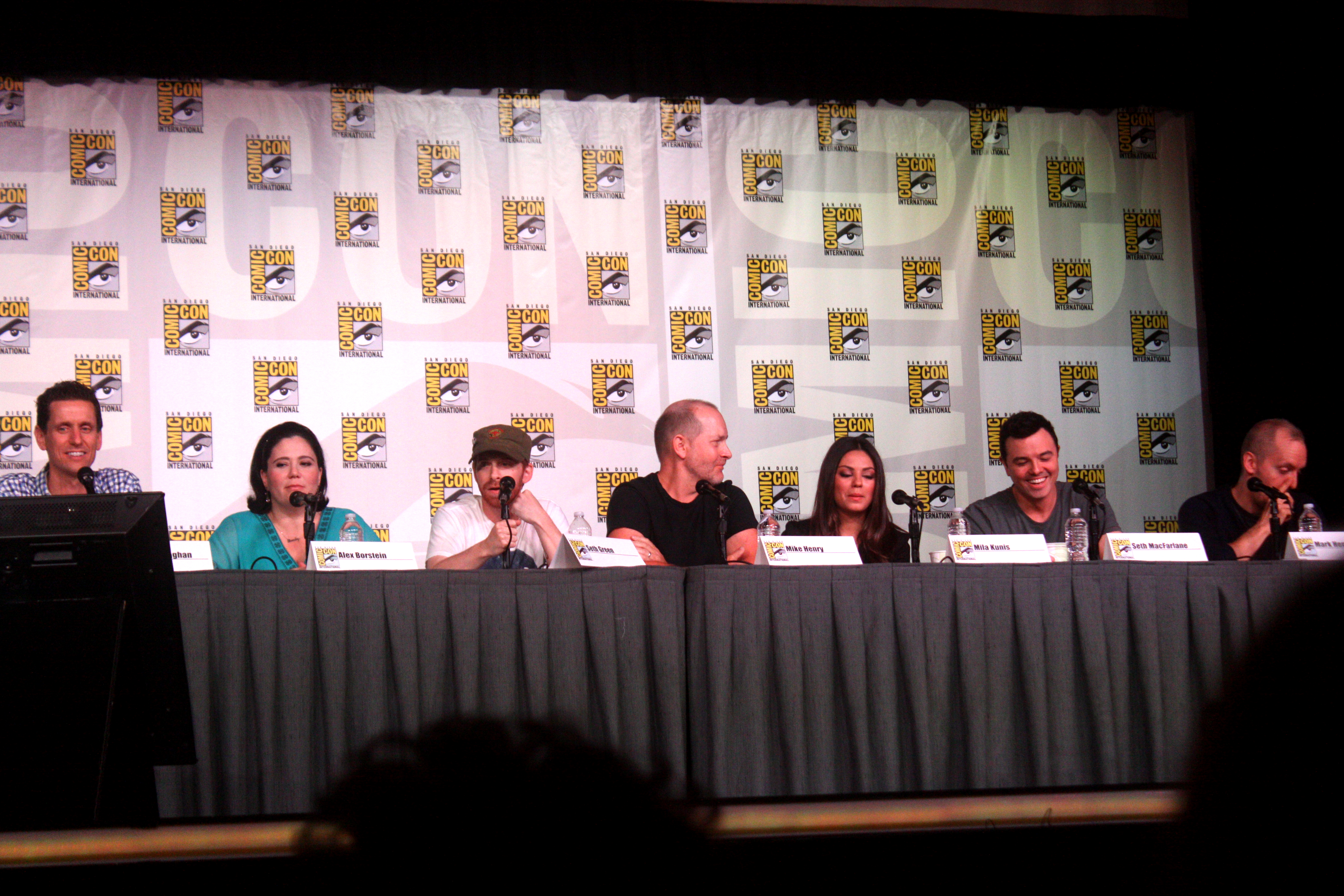
- Family Guy cast at the 2012 San Diego Comic-Con
Awards and nominations
Award	Wins	Nominations
Annie Awards	3	10
Artios Awards	4	6
ASCAP Film and Television Music Awards	1	1
BAFTA TV Awards	0	2
Cinema Audio Society Awards	0	2
Critics' Choice Television Award	0	2
Genesis Awards	1	1
Grammy Awards	0	1
Primetime Emmy Awards	9	32
Saturn Awards	1	4
Writers Guild of America Awards	0	2

Totals (Note: Certain award groups do not simply award one winner. They acknowledge several different recipients, have runners-up, and have third place. Since this is a specific recognition and is different from losing an award, runner-up mentions are considered wins in this award tally. For simplification and to avoid errors, each award in this list has been presumed to have had a prior nomination.)
- Wins: 22
- Nominations: 55

Family Guy is an American adult animated sitcom that has aired on Fox since January 31, 1999. Created by animator Seth MacFarlane, the show chronicles the adventures and endeavors of Griffin family and their various friends in the fictional city of Quahog, Rhode Island. Many of the ideas for the show originated in an animated short film The Life of Larry, which MacFarlane created in the mid-1990s as his thesis film while studying at the Rhode Island School of Design. Family Guy stars MacFarlane, Alex Borstein, Seth Green, Mila Kunis and Mike Henry. It is executive produced by MacFarlane and Steve Callaghan and Richard Appel, who also functions as its showrunner.

Since its debut, Family Guy has earned widespread critical acclaim. It has also received a variety of different award nominations, including 12 Annie Awards (with three wins), 7 Golden Reel Awards (with two wins), 32 Emmy Awards (with nine wins), 17 Teen Choice Awards (with five wins), and one Grammy Award.

Voice cast members MacFarlane, Borstein and Kunis have each received nominations for their voice acting performance. MacFarlane is the most decorated actor in the cast, with being the first and only cast member to have won an Emmy Award and being nominated for a Grammy Award. Family Guy: Live in Vegas, a soundtrack album released in 2005, received a Grammy Award nomination. In total, Family Guy has been nominated for over 91 awards and has won 24.

== Annie Awards ==
List of Annie Awards and nominations received by Family Guy
Year	Category	Nominee(s)	Result	Ref(s).
1999	Outstanding Individual Achievement for Music in an Animated Television Production	Walter Murphy, Seth MacFarlane, and David Zuckerman for the main title	Nominated	
2000	Outstanding Individual Achievement for Music in an Animated Television Production	Walter Murphy for "Dammit Janet"	Nominated	
2006	Best Directing in an Animated Television Production	Dan Povenmire for "PTV"	Nominated	
2006	Best Directing in an Animated Television Production	Peter Shin for "North by North Quahog"	Won	
2006	Best Voice Acting in an Animated Television Production	Seth MacFarlane for "Brian the Bachelor"	Won	
2007	Best Character Animation in a Television Production	Eileen K. Kohlhepp	Nominated	
2007	Best Voice Acting in an Animated Television Production	Mila Kunis for "Barely Legal"	Nominated	
2007	Best Writing in an Animated Television Production	Kirker Butler for "Barely Legal"	Nominated	
2007	Best Writing in an Animated Television Production	John Viener for "The Griffin Family History"	Nominated	
2008	Best Storyboarding in an Animated Television Production	Steven Fonti for "No Chris Left Behind"	Won	
2009	Best Voice Acting in an Animated Television Production or Short Form	Seth MacFarlane for "I Dream of Jesus"	Nominated	
2015	Outstanding Achievement in Editorial in an Animated TV/Broadcast Production	Mike Elias	Nominated	

== BAFTA TV Awards ==
List of British Academy Television Awards and nominations received by Family Guy
Year	Category	Recipient(s)	Result	Ref(s).
2008	Best International Programme	Seth MacFarlane, David A. Goodman, Chris Sheridan, Danny Smith	Nominated	
2010	Best International Programme	Seth MacFarlane	Nominated	

== Critics' Choice Television Award ==
List of Critics' Choice Television Awards and nominations received by Family Guy
Year	Category	Result	Ref(s).
2012	Best Animated Series	Nominated	
2014	Best Animated Series	Nominated	

== Golden Reel Awards ==
List of Golden Reel Awards and nominations received by Family Guy
Year	Category	Nominee(s)	Episode(s)	Result	Ref(s).
2000	Best Sound Editing – Television Animated Series – Sound	Bob Newlan (supervising sound/Foley/dialogue/ADR editor), Helen Luttrell (Foley editor/dialogue editor), Andrew Ellerd (Foley editor)	"Da Boom"	Nominated	
2001	Best Sound Editing – Television Animated Series – Sound	Bob Newlan (supervising sound editor), Andrew Ellerd, Erik Aadahl, Michael Babcock, Jeff Sawyer (sound editors), Helen Luttrell (Foley editor/dialogue editor)	"He's Too Sexy for His Fat"	Nominated	
2006	Best Sound Editing in Television: Animated	Bob Newlan (supervising sound editor), Stan Jones, Douglas M. Lackey (music editors), Andrew Ellerd (sound/Foley editor), Robert Ramirez (sound editor), Patrick Hogan, Sonya Henry (dialogue/ADR editors), Dale W. Perry (Foley artist)	"Blind Ambition"	Won	
2009	Best Sound Editing – Television Animation	Bob Newlan (supervising sound editor), Andrew Ellerd (sound designer, sound effects editor), Patrick S. Clark (dialogue editor), Jeremy Scott Olsen (sound editor), Stan Jones, Douglas M. Lackey (music editors), Dale W. Perry (Foley artist)	"Road to Germany"	Nominated	
2010	Best Sound Editing – Direct to Video	Bob Newlan (supervising sound editor); Andrew Ellerd (sound designer); Brian Nichols (sound effects editor); Patrick S. Clark, Mark Eklund (dialogue editor); Stan Jones, Douglas M. Lackey (music editors); Dale W. Perry (Foley artist)	"Something, Something, Something, Dark Side"	Won	
2011	Best Sound Editing - Direct to Video - Animation	Bob Newlan (supervising sound editor); Andrew Ellerd (sound designer); Stuart Martin (sound effects editor); Mark Eklund (dialogue editor); Patrick S. Clark, Stan Jones, Douglas M. Lackey (music editors); Dale W. Perry (Foley artist)	"It's a Trap!"	Won	
2013	Best Sound Editing – Sound Effects, Foley, Dialogue and ADR Animation in Television	Bob Newlan (supervising sound editor), Dale W. Perry (Foley artist), Andrew Ellerd (sound designer), Patrick S. Clark, Timothy A. Cleveland, Mark Eklund (editors)	"Yug Ylimaf"	Nominated	

== Grammy Awards ==
List of Grammy Awards and nominations received by Family Guy
Year	Category	Nominee(s)	Episode(s)	Result	Ref(s).
2012	Best Song Written for Visual Media	Seth MacFarlane, Ron Jones, Danny Smith	"Road to the North Pole" for "Christmastime Is Killing Us"	Nominated	

== Primetime Emmy Awards ==
List of Primetime Emmy Awards and nominations received by Family Guy
Year	Category	Nominee(s)	Episode(s)	Result	Ref(s).
2000	Outstanding Animated Program (For Programming Less Than One Hour)	Seth MacFarlane, David Zuckerman, Craig Hoffman, Daniel Palladino, Danny Smith, Billiam Coronel, Matt Weitzman, Mike Barker, Sherry Gunther, Gary Janetti, Pete Michels, Peter Shin, Dan Povenmire	"Road to Rhode Island"	Nominated	
2000	Outstanding Voice-Over Performance	Seth MacFarlane		Won	
2000	Outstanding Music and Lyrics	Ron Jones and Chris Sheridan	"Peter, Peter, Caviar Eater" for "We Only Live To Kiss Your Ass"	Nominated	
2002	Outstanding Music and Lyrics	Seth MacFarlane and Walter Murphy	"Brian Wallows and Peter's Swallows" for "You've Got a Lot to See"	Won	
2005	Outstanding Animated Program (For Programming Less Than One Hour)	Seth MacFarlane, David A. Goodman, Chris Sheridan, Danny Smith, Kara Vallow, Shannon Smith, Peter Shin, Greg Colton	"North by North Quahog"	Nominated	
2006	Outstanding Animated Program (For Programming Less Than One Hour)	Seth MacFarlane, David A. Goodman, Chris Sheridan, Danny Smith, Michael Rowe, Kara Vallow, Shannon Smith, Alec Sulkin, Wellesley Wild, Peter Shin, Dan Povenmire, Chris Robertson, Andi Klein	"PTV"	Nominated	
2007	Outstanding Individual Achievement in Animation	Steven Fonti	"No Chris Left Behind"	Won	
2007	Outstanding Original Music and Lyrics	Walter Murphy and Danny Smith	"Peter's Two Dads" for "My Drunken Irish Dad"	Nominated	
2008	Outstanding Animated Program (For Programming One Hour or More)	Seth MacFarlane, David A. Goodman, Chris Sheridan, Danny Smith, Mark Hentemann, Steve Callaghan, Alex Borstein, Mike Henry, Alec Sulkin, Wellesley Wild, Kara Vallow, Shannon Smith, Dominic Polcino, Peter Shin, Joseph Lee, Andi Klein	"Blue Harvest"	Nominated	
2008	Outstanding Music Composition for a Series (Original Dramatic Score)	Ron Jones	"Lois Kills Stewie"	Nominated	
2009	Outstanding Comedy Series	Seth MacFarlane, David A. Goodman, Chris Sheridan, Danny Smith, Mark Hentemann, Steve Callaghan, Brian Scully, Richard Appel, Alec Sulkin, Wellesley Wild, Mike Henry, Kara Vallow, Kirker Butler, Shannon Smith	Season 7	Nominated	
2009	Outstanding Voice-Over Performance	Seth MacFarlane	"I Dream of Jesus"	Nominated	
2010	Outstanding Individual Achievement in Animation	Greg Colton	"Road to the Multiverse"	Won	
2010	Outstanding Original Music and Lyrics	Seth MacFarlane and Walter Murphy	"Extra Large Medium" for "Down's Syndrome Girl"	Nominated	
2011	Outstanding Music Composition for a Series (Original Dramatic Score)	Walter Murphy	"And Then There Were Fewer"	Nominated	
2011	Outstanding Music Composition for a Series (Original Dramatic Score)	Ron Jones	"Road to the North Pole"	Nominated	
2011	Outstanding Original Music and Lyrics	Seth MacFarlane, Ron Jones and Danny Smith	"Road to the North Pole" for "Christmastime Is Killing Us"	Nominated	
2011	Outstanding Sound Mixing for a Comedy or Drama Series (Half-Hour) and Animation	Patrick S. Clark and Jim Fitzpatrick	"Road to the North Pole"	Won	
2013	Outstanding Voice-Over Performance	Seth MacFarlane	"Brian's Play"	Nominated	
2013	Outstanding Voice-Over Performance	Alex Borstein	"Lois Comes Out of Her Shell"	Nominated	
2014	Outstanding Character Voice-Over Performance	Seth MacFarlane	"Into Harmony's Way"	Nominated	
2015	Outstanding Character Voice-Over Performance	Seth MacFarlane	"Our Idiot Brian"	Nominated	
2016	Outstanding Character Voice-Over Performance	Seth MacFarlane	"Pilling Them Softly"	Won	
2017	Outstanding Character Voice-Over Performance	Seth MacFarlane	"The Boys in the Band"	Won	
2018	Outstanding Character Voice-Over Performance	Seth MacFarlane	"Send in Stewie, Please"	Nominated	
2018	Outstanding Character Voice-Over Performance	Alex Borstein	"Nanny Goats"	Won	
2018	Outstanding Sound Mixing for a Comedy or Drama Series (Half-Hour) and Animation	Jim Fitzpatrick, Patrick S. Clark and Aaron Diecker	"Three Directors"	Nominated	
2019	Outstanding Character Voice-Over Performance	Seth MacFarlane	"Con Heiress"	Won	
2019	Outstanding Character Voice-Over Performance	Alex Borstein	"Throw It Away"	Nominated	
2021	Outstanding Character Voice-Over Performance	Seth MacFarlane	"Stewie's First Word"	Nominated	
2023	Outstanding Character Voice-Over Performance	Alex Borstein	"A Bottle Episode"	Nominated	
2024	Outstanding Character Voice-Over Performance	Alex Borstein	"Teacher's Heavy Pet"	Nominated	

== Saturn Awards ==
List of Saturn Awards and nominations received by Family Guy
Year	Category	Result	Ref(s).
2008	Best Television Presentation	Won	
2017	Best Animated Series or Film on Television	Nominated	
2018	Best Animated Series or Film on Television	Nominated	
2019	Best Animated Series or Film on Television	Nominated	<
2021	Best Animated Series or Film on Television	Nominated	

== Writers Guild of America Awards ==
List of Writers Guild of America Awards and nominations received by Family Guy
Year	Category	Recipient(s)	Result	Ref(s).
2013	Outstanding Writing in Animation	David A. Goodman for "Forget-Me-Not"	Nominated	
2019	Outstanding Writing in Animation	Gary Janetti for "Send in Stewie, Please"	Nominated	
2022	Outstanding Writing in Animation	Daniel Peck for "Must Love Dogs"	Nominated	

== Miscellaneous awards ==
List of all other awards and nominations received by Family Guy
Year	Award	Category	Nominee(s)	Result	Ref(s).
2010	Artios Awards	Outstanding Achievement in Casting – Animation TV Programming	Linda Lamontagne	Won	
2012	Artios Awards	Outstanding Achievement in Casting – Television Animation	Linda Lamontagne	Won	
2013	Artios Awards	Outstanding Achievement in Casting – Television Animation	Linda Lamontagne	Won	
2015	Artios Awards	Outstanding Achievement in Casting – Television Animation (Children and Adult)	Linda Lamontagne	Won	
2016	Artios Awards	Outstanding Achievement in Casting – Television Animation (Adult)	Linda Lamontagne	Nominated	
2017	Artios Awards	Outstanding Achievement in Casting – Television Animation	Linda Lamontagne	Nominated	
2018	Artios Awards	Outstanding Achievement in Casting – Television Animation (Adult)	Linda Lamontagne	Nominated	
2022	Artios Awards	Outstanding Achievement in Casting – Television Animation (Adult)	Christine Terry and Jackie Sollitto	Nominated	
2023	Artios Awards	Outstanding Achievement in Casting – Television Animation (Adult)	Christine Terry and Jackie Sollitto	Nominated	
2024	Artios Awards	Outstanding Achievement in Casting – Television Animation (Adult)	Christine Terry and Jackie Sollitto	Nominated	
2025	Artios Awards	Outstanding Achievement in Casting – Television Animation (Adult)	Christine Terry and Jackie Sollitto	Nominated	
2013	ASCAP Film and Television Music Awards	Top Television Series	Seth MacFarlane, Walter Murphy, Ron Jones	Won	
2022	The Astra Awards	Best Broadcast Network or Cable Animated Series		Nominated	
2023	The Astra Awards	Best Broadcast Network or Cable Animated Series		Nominated	
2025	The Astra Awards	Best Lead Voice-Over Performance	Seth MacFarlane	Nominated	
2006	Cinema Audio Society Awards	Outstanding Achievement in Sound Mixing for DVD Original Programming	Jim Fitzpatrick, Sam Black, Dan Cubert for Stewie Griffin: The Untold Story	Won	
2010	Cinema Audio Society Awards	Outstanding Achievement in Sound Mixing for DVD Original Programming	Patrick S. Clark and Jim Fitzpatrick for "Something, Something, Something, Dark Side"	Nominated	
2015	Cinema Audio Society Awards	Outstanding Achievement in Sound Mixing for Television Series – Half Hour	Patrick S. Clar, Jim Fitzpatrick, Armin Steiner for "The Simpsons Guy"	Nominated	
2011	The Comedy Awards	Best Animated Comedy Series		Nominated	
2012	The Comedy Awards	Best Animated Comedy Series		Nominated	
2010	Genesis Awards	Sid Caesar Comedy Award	"Dog Gone"	Won	
2017	MTV Movie & TV Awards	Best Comedic Performance	Seth MacFarlane	Nominated	
2007	People's Choice Awards	Favorite TV Comedy – Animated		Nominated	
2008	People's Choice Awards	Favorite Animated TV Comedy		Nominated	
2009	People's Choice Awards	Favorite Animated Comedy		Nominated	
2011	People's Choice Awards	Favorite TV Family		Nominated	
2015	People's Choice Awards	Favorite Animated TV Show		Nominated	
2016	People's Choice Awards	Favorite Animated TV Show		Nominated	
2017	People's Choice Awards	Favorite Animated TV Show		Nominated	
2004	Satellite Awards	Best DVD Release of TV Shows	Volume 2	Nominated	
2005	Teen Choice Awards	Choice TV Show: Comedy		Nominated	
2005	Teen Choice Awards	Choice TV Actor: Comedy	Seth MacFarlane	Nominated	
2005	Teen Choice Awards	Choice TV Chemistry	Seth MacFarlane	Nominated	
2005	Teen Choice Awards	Choice TV Sidekick	Seth MacFarlane	Nominated	
2006	Teen Choice Awards	Choice TV: Animated Show		Won	
2007	Teen Choice Awards	Choice TV: Animated Show		Nominated	
2008	Teen Choice Awards	Choice TV: Animated Show		Won	
2009	Teen Choice Awards	Choice TV: Animated Show		Nominated	
2010	Teen Choice Awards	Choice TV: Animated Show		Won	
2011	Teen Choice Awards	Choice TV: Animated Show		Nominated	
2011	Teen Choice Awards	Choice TV: Villain	Seth MacFarlane	Nominated	
2012	Teen Choice Awards	Choice TV: Animated Show		Nominated	
2013	Teen Choice Awards	Choice TV: Animated Show		Nominated	
2014	Teen Choice Awards	Choice TV: Animated Show		Nominated	
2015	Teen Choice Awards	Choice TV: Animated Show		Won	
2016	Teen Choice Awards	Choice TV: Animated Show		Won	
2017	Teen Choice Awards	Choice TV: Animated Show		Won	
2018	Teen Choice Awards	Choice TV: Animated Show		Nominated	
2008	TP de Oro Award	Best Animated Series		Nominated	
2011	Visual Effects Society Award	Outstanding Models and Miniatures in a Broadcast Program or Commercial	Andrew Karr, Alec McClymont, Daniel Osaki, Paul Hegg for "Brian Griffin's House of Payne"	Nominated	
