= Road to Europe =

- Family Guy episode
- The episode's title card
- Episode no.: Season 3 Episode 20
- Directed by: Dan Povenmire
- Written by: Daniel Palladino
- Production code: 3ACX13
- Original air date: February 7, 2002

Guest appearances
- Gene Simmons as himself; Paul Stanley as himself; Andy Dick as himself; Fred Willard as Dave Campbell; Jane Lynch as Dottie Campbell; Lauren Graham as Mother Maggie; Sean Flynn as Little Arab Boy; Jon Favreau as Host of KISS Forum

Episode chronology
← Previous "Stuck Together, Torn Apart"	Next → "Family Guy Viewer Mail #1"
- Family Guy season 3

"Road to Europe" (originally called "European Road Show") is the 20th episode of the third season of the animated comedy series Family Guy, and the 48th episode overall. It originally aired on Fox in the United States on February 7, 2002. The episode follows baby Stewie, who becomes obsessed with the fictional British children's television series "Jolly Farm Revue". He decides to run away from home to become part of the cast and his anthropomorphic dog Brian decides to chase him down in an attempt to bring him back home. Meanwhile, Peter and Lois go to a Kiss concert, where Lois reveals she knows nothing about the band, much to Peter's embarrassment.

"Road to Europe" was written by Daniel Palladino and directed by Dan Povenmire. It received mostly positive reviews from critics for its storyline and its many cultural references. The episode featured Kiss members Gene Simmons and Paul Stanley. It also featured guest voices by comedian Andy Dick, actor and director Jon Favreau, actor Sean Flynn, actress and singer Lauren Graham, actress Michelle Horn, and voice actor Wally Wingert.

== Plot summary ==
Stewie is obsessed with a British television program called Jolly Farm Revue, a colorful children's TV show featuring several imaginary characters. Reluctant to stay in Quahog, Stewie decides to travel to "Jolly Farm" in London and live there forever. Desperate, he goes to the local airport and stows away on a transatlantic flight, intending to travel to Britain, and to find the BBC studios where Jolly Farm Revue is filmed. Brian tries to stop Stewie from leaving Rhode Island, and follows him on board the plane. By the time he finally finds Stewie, the plane has taken off. It then lands in the Middle East.

Brian begins to search for a way to get back to the United States, but Stewie refuses to leave with him and insists they continue to London. Brian and Stewie search for a camel to use as transportation, and they perform a musical number as a diversion in order to steal one. They begin their journey, but the camel dies in the middle of the desert. They soon find a nearby Comfort Inn, however, in which to stay. They steal a hot air balloon from the hotel premises and make their way to Vatican City, embarrassing the Pope upon landing, then traveling by train from Switzerland to Munich, and end up in Amsterdam. Upon finally arriving at the BBC Television Centre, Stewie is shocked to discover that the farm is a set, and his beloved characters are played by burnt-out, vulgar actors. Heartbroken, Stewie decides to travel back home with Brian to Quahog after getting revenge on the Mother Maggie actress for kicking him by defecating in her shoes. He loses interest in Jolly Farm and takes up a new obsession - "funky fruit hats" a la Carmen Miranda.

Meanwhile, Peter is overjoyed to hear about Kiss-stock, a five-night set of concerts in New England by his favorite band, Kiss. He and his wife, Lois, dress in face paint and leather just like the band members in Kiss, as does the rest of the crowd, and they manage to stand in the front row. Gene Simmons points the microphone at Lois as a way to prompt her to sing the next line in the chorus of "Rock and Roll All Nite," only to discover that she doesn't know the words, shaming Peter. Deeply saddened by this, Gene and Paul Stanley leave the stage, leaving Ace Frehley and Peter Criss to perform "Chattanooga Choo Choo" to cheer up the displeased audience.

After the concert, Peter accuses Lois of only pretending to be a Kiss fan, and they leave the concert venue in disgrace. Later that night, Peter and Lois stop at a Denny's on the way home from the concert. The Kiss members are seated at another table, and Lois recognizes Gene without his "Demon" make-up as Chaim Witz (Gene Simmons' birth name), an old boyfriend. Peter's faith in Lois is restored, and he proudly shares the news on public-access television that "my wife did Kiss."

== Production ==
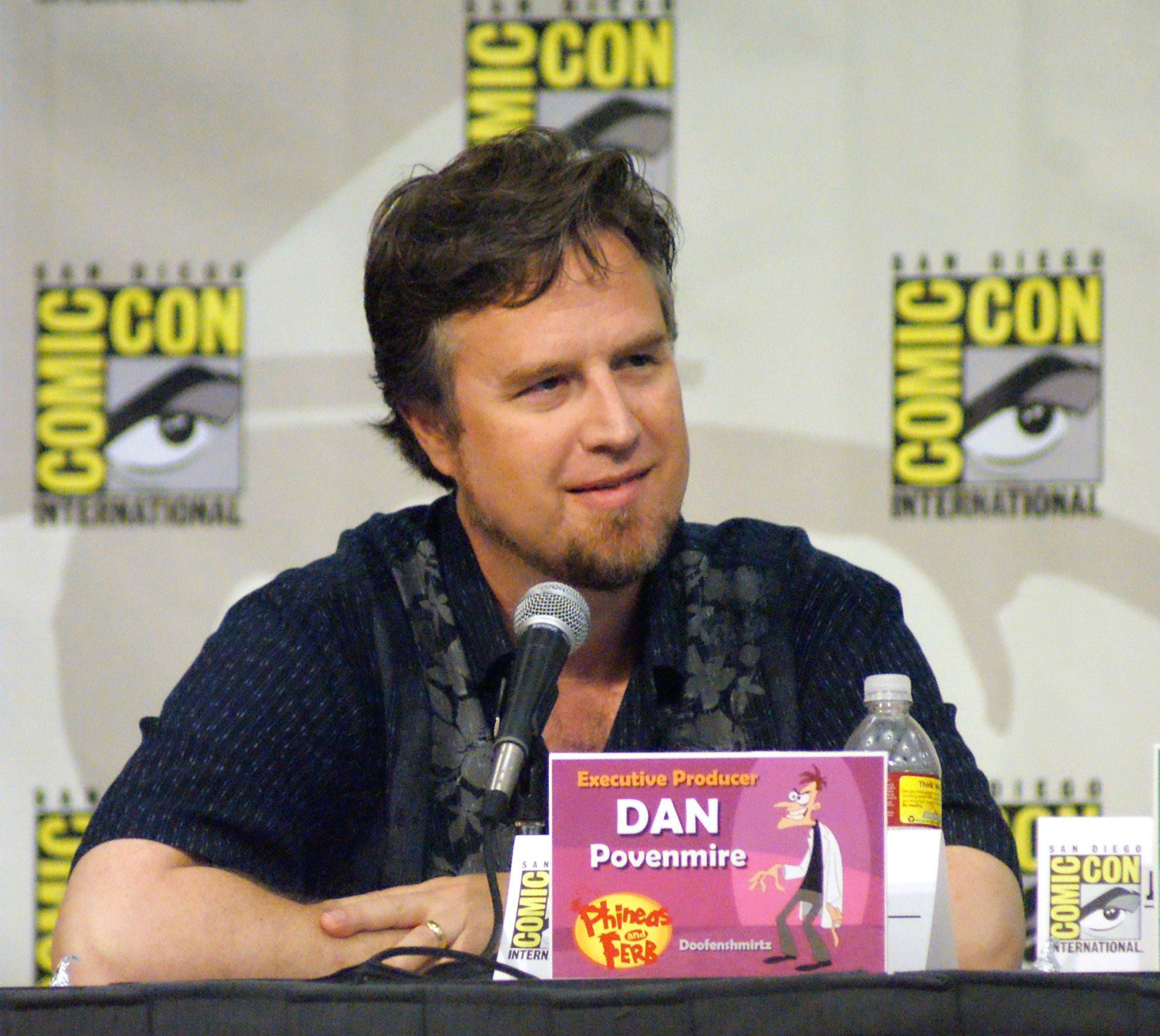
Dan Povenmire, who also directed the first "Road to" episode, directed "Road to Europe".

The episode was written by Daniel Palladino, his first official episode for the series, an executive producer for the show. In addition, the episode was directed by series regular Dan Povenmire, in his fourth episode directing for the season; the first three being "One If by Clam, Two If by Sea", "To Love and Die in Dixie", and "Brian Wallows and Peter's Swallows".

"Road to Europe" is the second episode of the "Road to..." hallmarks of the series, which have aired throughout various seasons of the show, and is the second "Road to..." episode to be directed by Povenmire. The episodes are a parody of the seven Road to ... comedy films starring Bing Crosby, Bob Hope and Dorothy Lamour. The episode was inspired by the 1941 film Road to Morocco, including its musical number "(We're off on the) Road to Morocco", which was previously parodied by the two characters, then with alternate lyrics, in the Family Guy episode "Road to Rhode Island". Fans originally believed that the original title of this episode was "Road to Baghdad", but in an interview with IGN MacFarlane stated that it was not the case.

In addition to the regular cast, the episode featured guest appearances by comedian Andy Dick, actor and director Jon Favreau, actor Sean Flynn, actress and singer Lauren Graham, actress Michelle Horn and voice actor Wally Wingert. It also guest starred Kiss members Gene Simmons and Paul Stanley as themselves.

== Cultural references ==
"Road to Europe" features several cultural references. Brian compares Stewie's look with Charlie Brown; Stewie responds by comparing him with Charlie Brown's dog Snoopy; both these characters are from the comic strip Peanuts. At the Kiss concert, the song that the band plays, and the one that Lois does not know the lyrics to, is the single "Rock and Roll All Nite". In the song Stewie and Brian sing, the Marquis de Sade, singer Ricky Martin and actress Phylicia Rashad are mentioned. Brian also uses Triumph the Insult Comic Dog's catch phrase, "For me to poop on" to insult Stewie.

While riding a tour bus in Germany, Brian looks at a German history book and notices that has no information regarding Germany from 1939 – 1945. When he questions the tour guide about this, the guide denies that anything happened in those years. Brian points out that Germany invaded Poland during that time, until the guide yells "Sie werden sich hinsetzen! Sie werden ruhig sein! Sie werden nicht beleidigen Deutschland!", literally meaning "You will sit down! You will be quiet! You will not insult Germany!" while making the Nazi salute with his left hand. The last sentence is grammatically incorrect, as the proper German statement would be, "Sie werden Deutschland nicht beleidigen!" At the beginning of the episode, the credits are presented with title cards containing images of Brian and Stewie passing by various iconic places in Europe. These include France's Eiffel Tower, Italy's Leaning Tower of Pisa and a venetian gondola, the United Kingdom's Stonehenge and Greece's Parthenon. Other iconic items shown include the Union Flag and the Pope.

== Reception ==
"Brian and Stewie once again reunite for a memorable duet titled, "You and I Are So Awfully Different." If that's not enough, Stewie and Brian also manage to offend the Pope on their way to the Jolly Farm Revue set. While not as exciting as some of their other adventures, the musical number alone makes this episode worthy as one of Stewie and Brian's best adventures."

— Ahsan Haque, IGN.

Reviews of the episode by television critics were mostly positive. Critic Ahsan Haque of IGN placed "Road to Europe" in the top ten of Stewie and Brian's Greatest Adventures, ranking it fifth. Haque noted that the episode is not as entertaining as many of the other Stewie and Brian adventures, but the song included in the episode, "You and I Are So Awfully Different" made it worthy of an appearance on the list. "Road to Europe" is the lowest ranked Road to ... episode on the list with "Road to Germany" at number four, "Road to Rupert" at number three, "Road to the Multiverse" at number two and "Road to Rhode Island" ranked as the best. Television critic Ramsey Isler, also of IGN, commented positively about the episode in his review of the eighth-season episode "Go Stewie, Go," which contained an American version of Jolly Farm Revue. Isler went on to note, "for the most part the Jolly Farm concept is much less interesting than it was in the much more amusing and classic Family Guy episode, 'Road to Europe.'"
