= Road to ... (Family Guy) =

Series of episodes in Family Guy

The "Road to ..." episodes, also known as the Family Guy Road shows, are a series of episodes in the animated series Family Guy. They are a parody of the seven Road to ... comedy films, starring Bing Crosby, Bob Hope, and Dorothy Lamour.

These episodes revolve around Stewie and Brian on a road trip in a foreign, supernatural or science fiction setting outside the show's normal location in Quahog, Rhode Island. The first, titled "Road to Rhode Island", aired on May 30, 2000, as a part of the second season. The episodes are known for featuring elaborate musical numbers, similar to the original films. As of 2026, there are eight "Road to" episodes.

The "Road to" episodes contain several signature elements, including a special version of the opening sequence, custom musical cues and musical numbers, and parodies of science fiction and fantasy films. Many of the episodes are popular among television critics, and have been nominated for several awards. In 2000, "Road to Rhode Island" was nominated for the Primetime Emmy Award in the "Outstanding Animated Program (for Programming Less Than One Hour)" category. In 2009, "Road to Germany", along with two other episodes from the seventh season, were nominated for the Primetime Emmy Award in the "Outstanding Comedy Series" category, the first time in 48 years multiple episodes of one animated series were nominated for the same award.

== Episodes ==
No. in Road to... episodes	No. in series overall	Title	Directed by	Written by	Original release date	Prod. code	US viewers (millions)
1	S2E13	"Road to Rhode Island"	Dan Povenmire	Gary Janetti	May 30, 2000	2ACX12	6.47
2	S3E20	"Road to Europe"	Dan Povenmire	Daniel Palladino	February 7, 2002	3ACX13	4.35
3	S5E09	"Road to Rupert"	Dan Povenmire	Patrick Meighan	January 28, 2007	5ACX04	8.80
4	S7E03	"Road to Germany"	Greg Colton	Patrick Meighan	October 19, 2008	6ACX08	9.07
5	S8E01	"Road to the Multiverse"	Greg Colton	Wellesley Wild	September 27, 2009	7ACX06	10.17
6	S9E07	"Road to the North Pole"	Greg Colton	Chris Sheridan; Danny Smith	December 12, 2010	8ACX08; 8ACX09	8.03
7	S11E21	"Roads to Vegas"	Greg Colton	Steve Callaghan	May 19, 2013	AACX20	5.28
8	S14E20	"Road to India"	Greg Colton	Danny Smith	May 22, 2016	DACX18	2.59

== Segments ==
"Road to" episodes typically consist of three parts following a series of theatrical or cultural-themed credits, and beginning with a segment at the Griffin family home in Quahog, Rhode Island. This segment usually establishes a conflict that Stewie and Brian must overcome by leaving Quahog and the rest of the Griffin family. For the second segment, Stewie and Brian obtain the established goal, which differs in each episode, and have included Brian reuniting with his mother in "Road to Rhode Island", Stewie finding his lost teddy bear in "Road to Rupert", or rescuing Mort Goldman, the town's pharmacist, in "Road to Germany".

== Production and development ==
"[Road to the Multiverse] is a "Road" show, and traditionally, Dan Povenmire directed the "Road" episodes. He did "Road to Rhode Island", "Road to Europe", "Road to Rupert", and the "Road" episodes were always kind of a special situation. Brian and Stewie go on an adventure, kind of like Hope and Crosby, and it has special title cards, they sing songs.[...] This felt like a "Road" show.

— Greg Colton, on "Road to the Multiverse"

The "Road to" episodes are a parody of the seven Road to ... comedy films released between 1940 and 1962, which starred actors Bing Crosby, Bob Hope and Dorothy Lamour. Family Guy creator and executive producer Seth MacFarlane came up with the idea to create the episodes, being a fan of the original film series.

The first "Road to" episode, titled "Road to Rhode Island", aired in 2000 as a part of the second season of Family Guy, and featured Brian and Stewie attempting to find Brian's mother. The episode was the first Family Guy contribution by director Dan Povenmire, and it was written by Gary Janetti, who had previously written for the show during its first and second seasons. MacFarlane granted Povenmire substantial creative freedom. Povenmire recalled that MacFarlane would tell him, "We've got two minutes to fill. Give me some visual gags. Do whatever you want. I trust you." Povenmire praised MacFarlane's management style for letting him "have [...] fun".

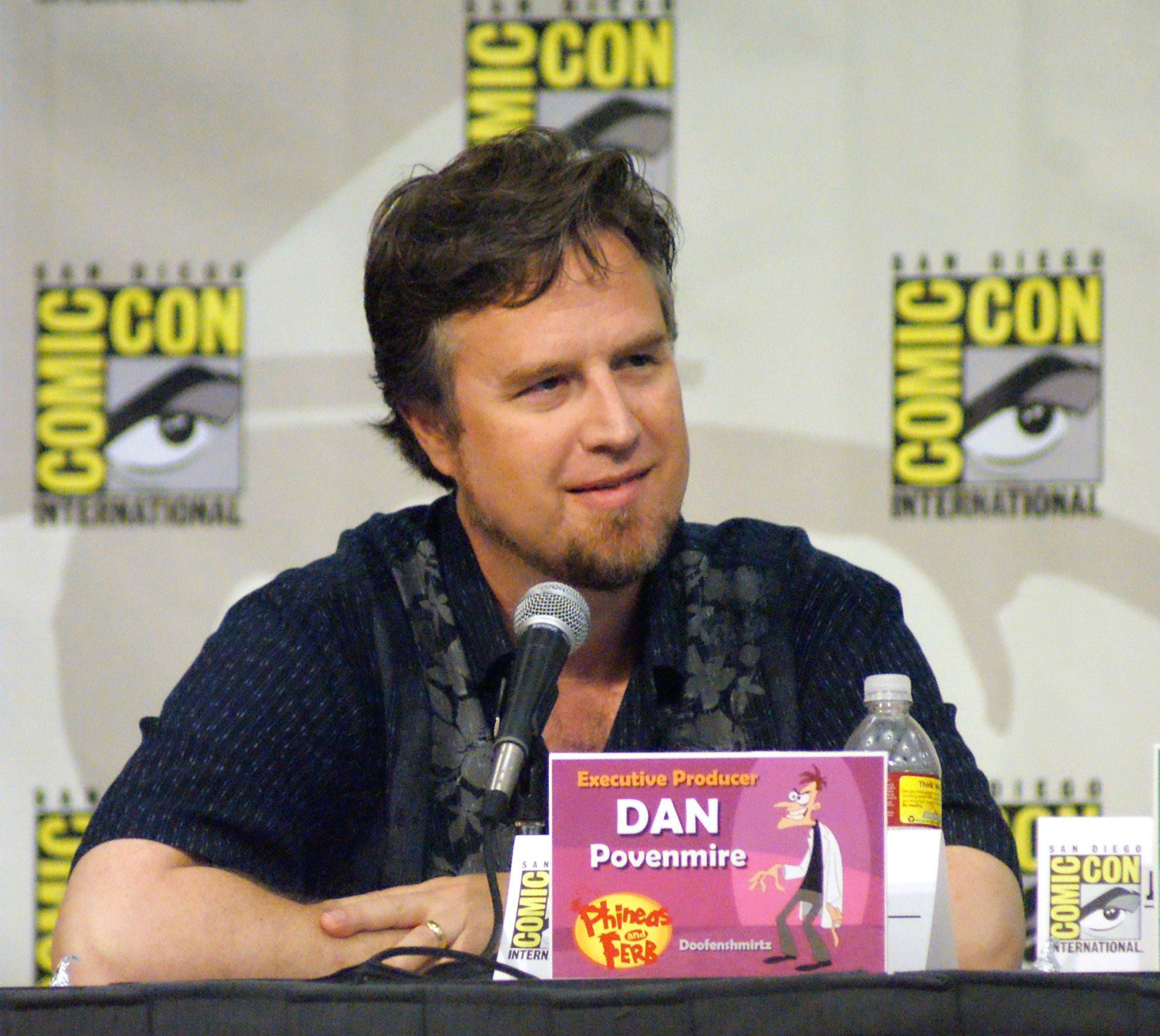
Dan Povenmire was the director for the first three "Road to" episodes until he left to create his own series Phineas and Ferb.

After the episode's success, including its nomination for a Primetime Emmy Award, a second episode in the "Road to" series was produced for the third season, titled "Road to Europe". The episode was inspired by the 1942 film Road to Morocco, including its musical number "(We're Off on the) Road to Morocco", which was previously parodied by the two characters, with new lyrics, in "Rhode Island". Povenmire returned to direct the episode but this time it was written by Daniel Palladino, who was a guest-writer.

The fifth-season episode "Saving Private Brian", originally titled "Road to Iraq", was at first intended to be the third installment in the Road series, however it was changed before airing.

The third episode in the series was not produced in the fourth season, but instead it was produced in the fifth season, titled "Road to Rupert", which followed Stewie in his attempt to relocate his teddy bear, Rupert, who was taken to Aspen, Colorado, was the last episode of the Road shows to be directed by Dan Povenmire. Povenmire left Family Guy soon after, following the conclusion of the fifth season, to create his own series, titled Phineas and Ferb, which has since been nominated for five Primetime Emmy Awards with two Emmy wins. It was written by Patrick Meighan who had written the fourth-season episode "8 Simple Rules for Buying My Teenage Daughter".

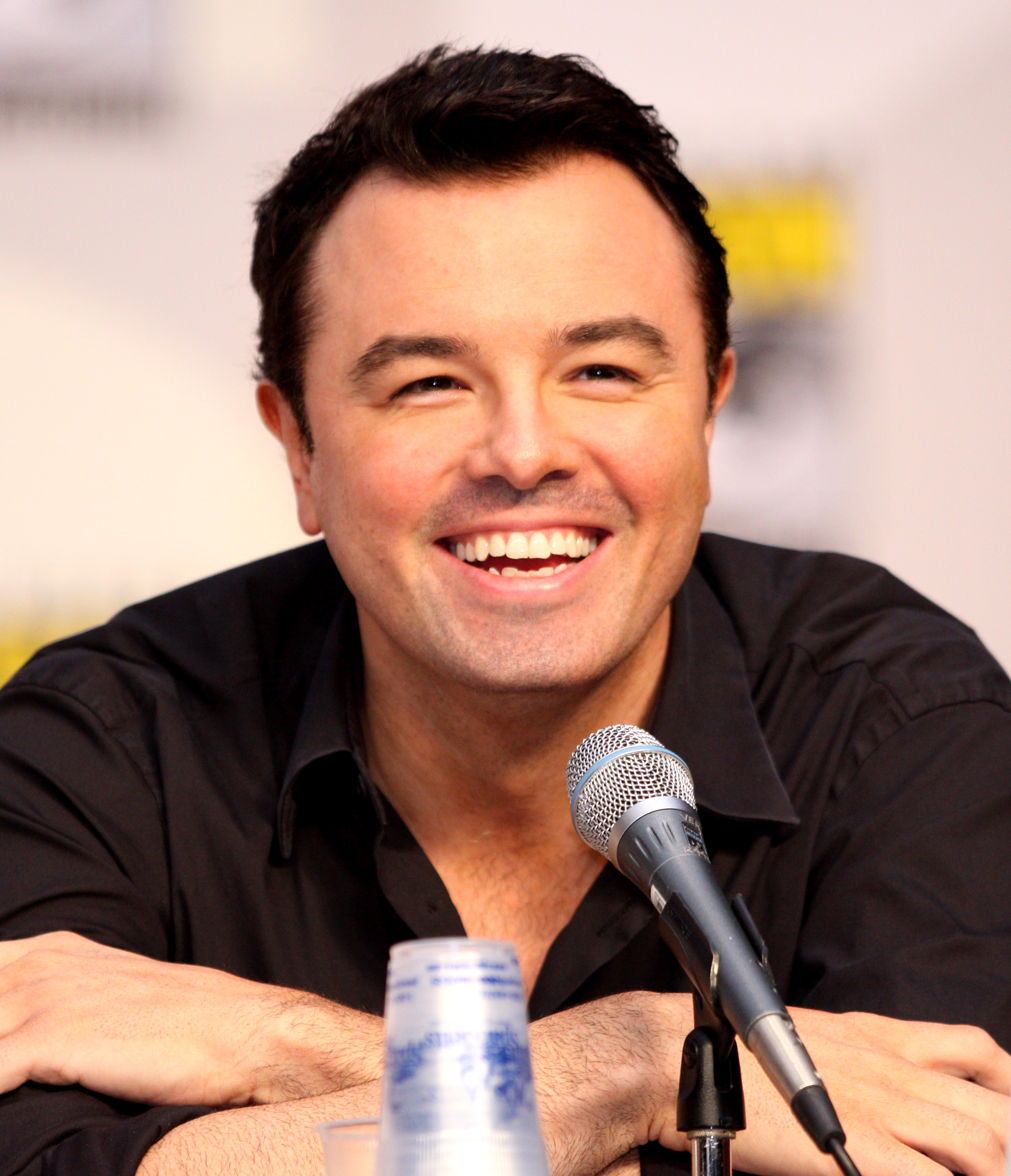
Series creator Seth MacFarlane came up with the idea to create the series of episodes.

As a result, series regular Greg Colton, who had worked on "Brian Goes Back to College", "No Meals on Wheels", and also "8 Simple Rules for Buying My Teenage Daughter", took over Povenmire's role as director of the "Road to" episodes. The next installment was titled "Road to Germany", which follows Brian and Stewie going back in time to rescue their neighbor Mort Goldman from the Nazi invasion of Poland. The episode was produced for the seventh season, it aired on October 19, 2008. Meighan returned to write the episode. After reading the script aloud, Jewish executive producer David A. Goodman said, "I'm going to get kicked out of my temple."

The next "Road to" episode was announced at the 2008 San Diego Comic-Con in San Diego, California, on July 25, 2008. It was titled "Road to the Multiverse" and it was produced in the eighth season. Though it was not originally intended to be a "Road to" episode, Greg Colton convinced series creator and executive producer Seth MacFarlane and "Spies Reminiscent of Us" director Cyndi Tang to change the episode's title from "Sliders", parodying the science fiction television series Sliders. Colton's suggestion of the new title "Road to the Multiverse" was accepted, as was altering the premise of "Spies Reminiscent of Us", the season's original "Road to" episode. The episode was not written by Meighan, instead it was written by Wellesley Wild who wrote "PTV".

The sixth episode was announced at the 2010 San Diego Comic-Con, and follows Brian and Stewie on an adventure to the North Pole. It aired during the show's ninth season, and is titled "Road to the North Pole". The episode was the first Road show to be produced and broadcast in high-definition, the first to be a full hour in length, and was directed by Colton.

The tenth-season episode "Back to the Pilot", originally titled "Road to the Pilot", was at first intended to be the seventh installment in the Road series, however it was changed before airing.

The seventh episode was announced at the 2012 San Diego Comic-Con. The episode involves Brian and Stewie teleporting to Las Vegas. Except something goes wrong with the machine and Brian and Stewie get cloned. One pair has the best possible time in Las Vegas, the other two have the worst possible time. The episode, titled "Roads to Vegas", aired as the show's eleventh-season finale in May 2013.

== Reception ==
"When Brian and Stewie are paired together for an on the road adventure, the results are usually side-splittingly hilarious. This first "Road to" episode is a perfect example of how great these two characters can be when paired together. We get to learn about Brian's origins and also see a bit more Stewie's slow transformation from evil genius to the insecure and desperate homosexual that we've reluctantly grown accustomed to seeing in recent episodes."

— Ahsan Haque, IGN on "Road to Rhode Island"

The "Road to" episodes are often among the most critically acclaimed episodes of the series. In a 2009 review of "Road to Rhode Island", Ahsan Haque of IGN gave the episode a perfect score of ten out of ten, praising the episode for its "great writing, hilarious jokes, a catchy musical, and a story that's both hilarious and touching at the same time". In a subsequent review by IGN of "Road to Germany", Haque again gave the episode high marks for its "exciting storyline, and some hilariously offensive humor". Similarly, "Road to the Multiverse" was received very positively by television credits, who called the episode "the best of the early episodes we've seen on the series". In addition, "Road to the Multiverse" was the highest rated episode of the eighth season, in terms of total viewership.

The episodes are generally praised by critics for the connection between Brian and Stewie. IGN stated that when Stewie and Brian are paired together for adventures in the series it becomes hilarious, also mentioning that it was great that they could learn more deeply Brian and see Stewie's transformation of character. TV Squad critic Brett Love has stated that he enjoys the episodes, especially the parts that show Stewie and Brian relationship, in his review of "Road to Rupert" he commented that Stewie and Brian's story made the episode for him. Both IGN and TV Squad have praised "Road to Germany", "Road to Rupert" and "Road to Rhode Island" for having that type of connection in their respective reviews.

Despite the praise, reviews of some episodes were more critical. During her review of Road to Germany, Alex Rocha of TV Guide wrote, "it seemed that the show has taken a slight fall back. After having great episodes the past few weeks to get this current season started on a roll, we have witnessed another average, even sub-par episode. Brett Love of TV Squad praised "Road to Rupert", though noted that he did not like the episode's B-story.

=== Awards ===
In 2000, "Road to Rhode Island" was nominated for the Primetime Emmy Award in the "Outstanding Animated Program (for Programming Less Than One Hour)" category, but ultimately lost to The Simpsons episode "Behind the Laughter". In 2009, "Road to Germany", along with two other episodes from the seventh season, were nominated for the Primetime Emmy Award in the "Outstanding Comedy Series" category, the first time in 48 years an animated series was nominated for the same award. The show lost to the NBC series 30 Rock, who had won the award in both 2007 and 2008. In 2011, "Road to the North Pole" won an Emmy Award for Outstanding Sound Mixing for a Comedy or Drama Series (Half-Hour) and Animation.

In IGN's top ten list of Stewie and Brian's Greatest Adventures, the "Road to" episodes gains each spot on the top five with "Road to Europe" in spot number five, "Road to Germany" in number four, "Road to Rupert" in number three, "Road to the Multiverse" in number two, and the first episode, "Road to Rhode Island", in the number-one spot in the list. Other episodes in the list included "Saving Private Brian", "Stuck Together, Torn Apart" and "Movin' Out (Brian's Song)".

== See also ==
- Family Guy
- List of Family Guy episodes
