= Road to ... =

Series of comedy movies

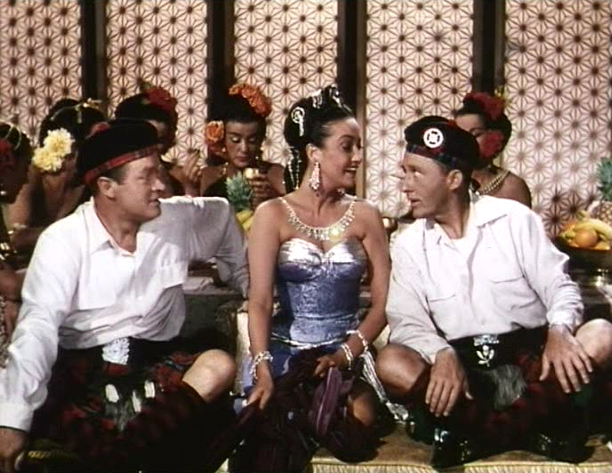
Hope, Lamour and Crosby in Road to Bali (1952)

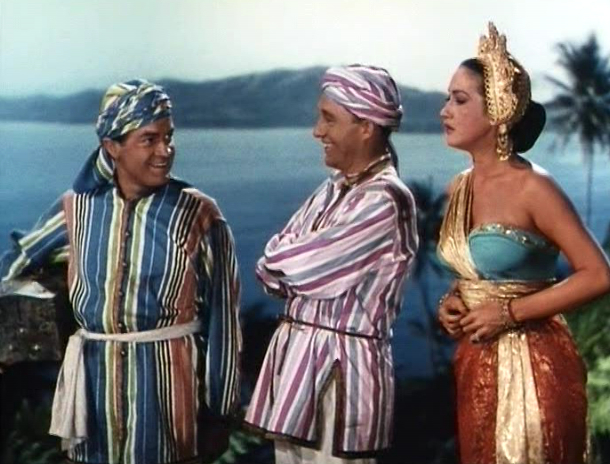
Hope, Crosby and Lamour in Road to Bali

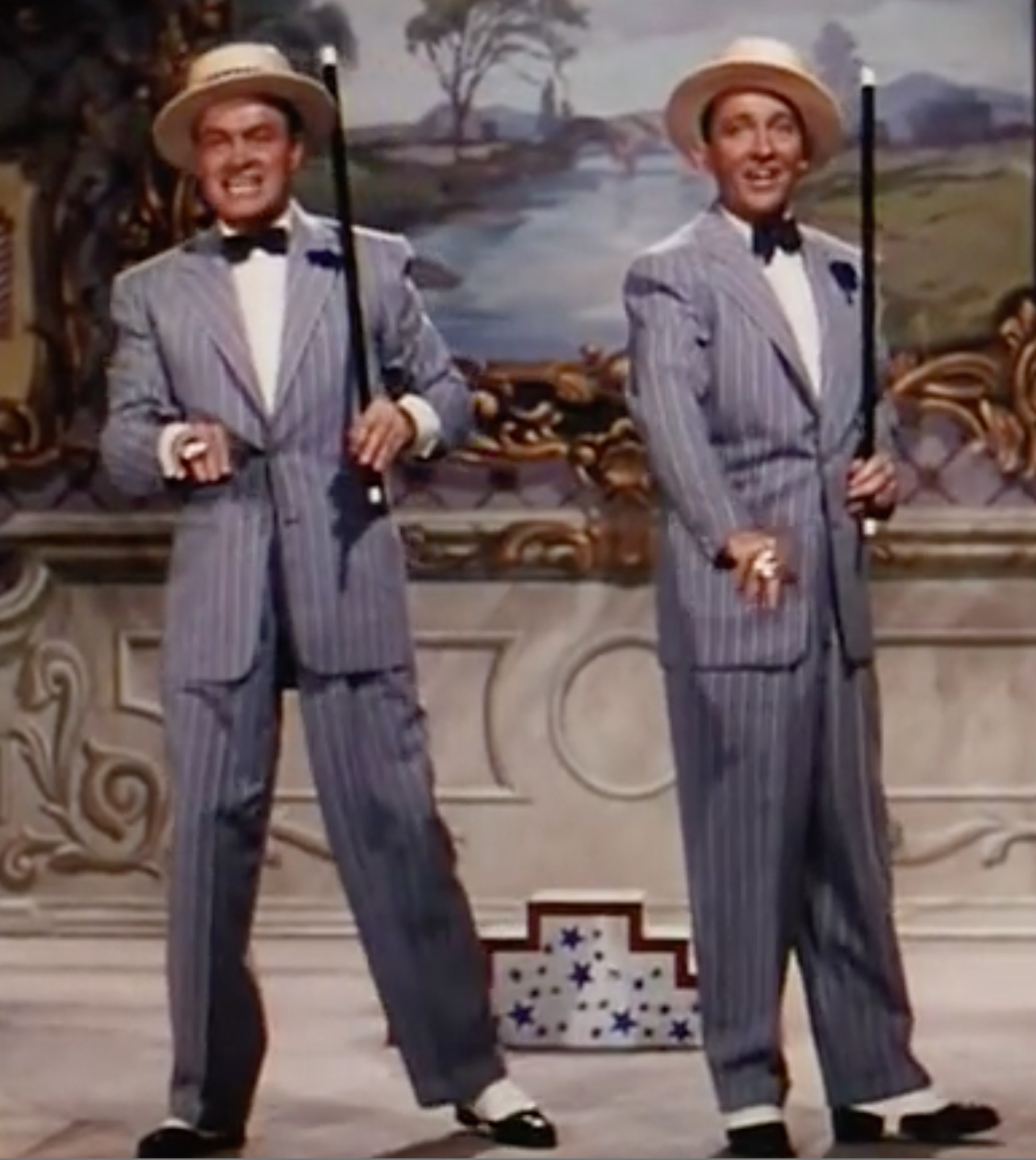
Hope and Crosby sing and dance during "Chicago Style" in Road to Bali

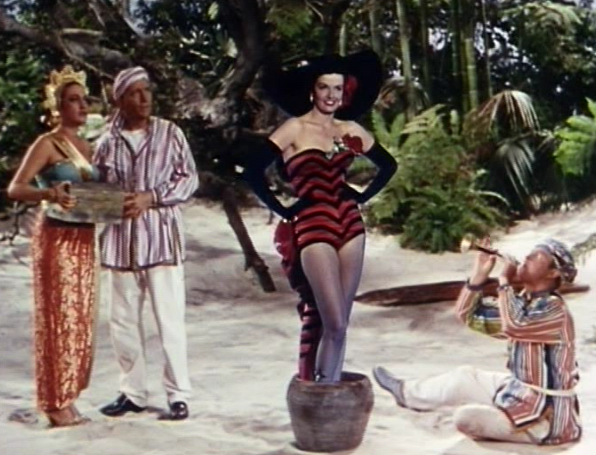
With Jane Russell in Road to Bali

Road to ... is a series of seven comedy films starring Bing Crosby, Bob Hope, and Dorothy Lamour. They are also often referred to as the "Road" pictures or the "Road" series. The movies were a combination of adventure, comedy, romance, and music. The minimal plot often took a back seat to gags, which appeared improvised but were usually scripted.

== Films in the series ==
- Road to Singapore (1940)
- Road to Zanzibar (1941)
- Road to Morocco (1942)
- Road to Utopia (made in 1943, but not released until 1946)
- Road to Rio (1947)
- Road to Bali (1952)
- The Road to Hong Kong (1962)
- Road to the Fountain of Youth (cancelled)

Each film is not simply a comedy, but a satire of some of the popular film genres of the day, including jungle, Arabian nights, Alaskan adventure, and the high seas.

In 1977, an eighth Road to... movie was planned, titled Road to the Fountain of Youth, but Crosby died that year of a heart attack.

In 1947, Astor Pictures released a compilation film of several of Crosby's Educational Pictures short subjects called The Road to Hollywood to evoke the series. The United States Navy also commissioned Hope and Crosby to produce the 1945 short film Road to Home.

== Running gags ==
Beginning with Road to Singapore, the films also included in-joke references to other Hollywood actors and jabs at Paramount Pictures, the studio that released all the films except for The Road to Hong Kong. There are also frequent instances in which Bob Hope breaks the fourth wall to address the audience directly, such as in Road to Bali, in which he says, "[Crosby]'s gonna sing, folks. Now's the time to go out and get the popcorn."

Hope and Crosby would usually play some form of confidence men trying to make a lot of money, with Bing coming up with the ideas and Bob usually doing most of the dirty work. Another common set-piece in the films is a monologue by Crosby "telling it like it is" to the Dorothy Lamour character, only to fall into traditional Crosby-singing-a-ballad; an example from The Road to Rio (1947) features the Crosby character analyzing the true love-encounters of a (fictional) film scene, followed by his singing "But Beautiful" (Jimmy Van Heusen / Johnny Burke).

When confronted by the villain, Hope and Crosby would use a "patty cake" routine before throwing punches, though this would sometimes not work, as in Road to Morocco. The only film in the series in which the routine was not used was in Road to Utopia.

Both characters would usually promise to not allow women to interfere with their plans, and both would immediately see a woman and forget that promise. Crosby would almost always end up with her, with the exceptions being in Road to Utopia and Road to Rio (although hypnosis was involved in the latter case).

Hope's character usually would have a nickname with which he would be referred to throughout the film, as in Road to Morocco, when he was called "Turkey", and Road to Zanzibar, in which he was called "Fearless".

Crosby credited writer Barney Dean with standing off-camera and continuously coming up with jokes.

Hope would also break the fourth wall continuously to over-act, often with an upbraiding from Crosby. Hope would then blame his overacting on his attempt to win an Oscar. In reality, Hope never won any Oscar for his work, although he did receive honorary Oscars. Later, when Hope was a regular Oscar host, he incorporated his "Oscar bait" whines into his monologues there.

== Reception ==
Box office performance for the Road to... films
Film	U.S. release date	US/Canada theatrical rental
Road to Singapore	March 14, 1940	$1,600,000^{*}
Road to Zanzibar	April 11, 1941	TBD
Road to Morocco	November 10, 1942	$3,800,000
Road to Utopia	February 27, 1946	$4,500,000
Road to Rio	December 25, 1947	$4,500,000
Road to Bali	December 25, 1952	$3,000,000
The Road to Hong Kong	May 23, 1962	$2,600,000
Total		$20,000,000

^{*}Worldwide theatrical rental

== Homages and other influence ==
- The 1944 Famous Studios Popeye cartoon We're On Our Way to Rio is a parody of these films.
- The April 20, 1966 episode of The Danny Thomas Show, titled "The Road to Lebanon," featured Bing Crosby scouting locations in Beirut for a new Road picture without Bob Hope.
- In the 1981 Mel Brooks film History of the World, Part I, on escaping from the Romans, Brooks and co-star Gregory Hines parody the series' "We're off on the road to..." signature song by singing "We're off on the road to Judea, we certainly do get around..."
- The 1985 film Spies Like Us, starring Dan Aykroyd and Chevy Chase, is an homage to the films; Hope makes a cameo as himself in one scene. The phrase "Road to Dushanbe" is uttered several times throughout the movie. Dushanbe is near the ultimate destination of the protagonists.
- The 1987 film Ishtar was envisioned by writer/director Elaine May as an homage to the "Road" series.
- The 1990 They Might Be Giants song "Road Movie to Berlin" references the films in its title.
- The TaleSpin episode "Road to Macadamia" pays tribute to the series, including spoofs on the songs.
- Three episodes of the 1991–1995 animated series Taz-Mania spoofed the Road to.. movies, starring Hugh Tasmanian Devil, Taz's father and a Crosby parody. Taz's uncle Drew would later be introduced, naturally parodying Hope. They featured in the episodes "Road to Taz-Mania," "Return of the Road to Taz-Mania Strikes Back" and "Yet Another Road to Taz-Mania."
- The Duckman episode "Road to Dendron" spoofs the series.
- The 2000 animated film The Road to El Dorado is an homage to the Road movies and contains many popular beats, including creating a distraction before fighting an opponent.
- In the 2001–2003 Disney animated series The Legend of Tarzan, the characters Hugo and Hooft are loosely based on Hope and Crosby (though not in appearance).
- The animated TV series Family Guy has had eight "Road to ..." episodes that spoof the original Road pictures, starring Brian and Stewie Griffin: "Road to Rhode Island", "Road to Europe", "Road to Rupert", "Road to Germany", "Road to the Multiverse", "Road to the North Pole", "Roads to Vegas", and "Road to India". In addition, the series' 2009 episode "Spies Reminiscent of Us" is an homage to Spies Like Us, even guest starring Aykroyd and Chase, which in turn was based on the "Road" films.
- The television series My Little Pony: Friendship is Magic episode "Road to Friendship" from September 1, 2018, was paying homage to these films with the episode title and a song by the same name.
- In the 1980s, Eric Idle wanted to make a film called The Road to Mars, but became so frustrated by executive meddling at Hollywood studios that he wrote it as a novel instead.
