= I Dream of Jesus =

- Family Guy episode
- Peter with Jesus Christ at a record store with posters for Nirvana's In Utero, R.E.M.'s Automatic for the People and Pink Floyd's The Dark Side of the Moon in the background
- Episode no.: Season 7 Episode 2
- Directed by: Mike Kim
- Written by: Brian Scully
- Production code: 6ACX05
- Original air date: October 5, 2008

Guest appearances
- Ike Barinholtz as Dane Cook; Paris Hilton as herself; Perez Hilton as himself; Amanda MacDonald as Lindsay Lohan; Debra Wilson as Star Jones; Alec Sulkin as Jesus Christ; Alexandra Breckenridge as Woman; Kirker Butler as George W. Bush; Steve Callaghan as James Dean and Quahog Citizen #1; Chris Cox as Waiter, Passerby and Crowd; Ralph Garman as Manager, Scientist, Maitre d' and Guy; Mark Hentemann as Audience Member #1; Russ Leatherman as Mr. Moviefone; Danny Smith as Alan Sherman Record, Sheriff and Audience Member #2; John Viener as Emcee

Episode chronology
← Previous "Love, Blactually"	Next → "Road to Germany"
- Family Guy season 7

"I Dream of Jesus" is the second episode in the seventh season of the American animated television series Family Guy. It originally aired on Fox in the United States on October 5, 2008. The episode makes prominent use of the song "Surfin' Bird" by the Trashmen and features Peter finding Jesus Christ, voiced by Alec Sulkin, working at a record shop and convincing him to make his second coming. Directed by Mike Kim and written by Brian Scully, the title of the episode refers to the television series I Dream of Jeannie. The episode guest starred Chris Cox, Ike Barinholtz, Amanda MacDonald, Niecy Nash, Sulkin and Paris and Perez Hilton.

The episode received mixed reviews from critics, with the more negative reviews going to the portrayal of Jesus, while the positive reviews went to the "Surfin' Bird" plot. According to Nielsen Media Research, "I Dream of Jesus" was Fox's most-watched program the evening it first aired, with 8.4 million views. Seth MacFarlane was nominated for the Primetime Emmy Award for Outstanding Voice-Over Performance and the Annie Award for his role as Peter Griffin in this episode. This was one of three episodes (along with "Road to Germany" and "Family Gay") submitted the year Family Guy was nominated for the "Outstanding Comedy Series".

== Plot ==
The family is having lunch at a 1950s-themed restaurant where the waiters dress up as celebrities from the 1950s, including James Dean, Marilyn Monroe, and Elvis Presley. Peter hears his favorite song, the Trashmen's "Surfin' Bird", on the jukebox. He obtains the record from the restaurant when an employee realizes that the song actually came out in the 1960s and therefore clashes with the 1950s themed diner. Peter repeats the song over and over on the way home and every day after that, annoying the family. The final straw of the family's hatred of "Surfin' Bird" is when Peter foolishly spends over $6,000 of their savings on a two-minute clip of himself on TV saying, "I dream of an America where everybody knows that the bird is the word" and singing the song again.

Stewie and Brian steal the record while Peter is asleep and destroy it. In a fit of rage, Peter accuses the others, saying they had a motive because he changed his will and left everything to the record. He then furiously goes to the town's sole record store the next morning to buy another copy, only to be told that "a baby and a dog" (referring to Stewie and Brian, respectively) had bought and destroyed all the copies. Peter is frustrated but gets distracted when he recognizes the record sales clerk as Jesus Christ.

Jesus reveals he visits Earth every 100 years, and since his father has become highly irritable after giving up smoking, he needs some time away. He and Peter became friends, and Peter invites him to dinner along with his family. The usually skeptical Brian asks for proof that Jesus is who he claims to be, so he turns everyone's dinner into hot-fudge sundaes and fulfills Peter's request to enlarge Lois' breasts. Peter convinces him to make his second coming public. Jesus walks on water to retrieve a dollar bill that blew out of Peter's hand. Consequently, he becomes famous and makes celebrity appearances on The Tonight Show with Jay Leno and the MTV Movie Awards, and his growing popularity leads him to neglect his friendship with Peter.

The next day, Peter watches the news, where Tom Tucker reports that a disoriented Jesus has been arrested after being found in Mary-Kate Olsen's apartment that morning. After Peter bails him out of jail, Jesus decides that he is not yet mature enough to stay on Earth and bids farewell to the family. Before he leaves, Jesus gives Peter a gift, another record of "Surfin' Bird", and Peter once again annoys his family with the song.

== Production ==
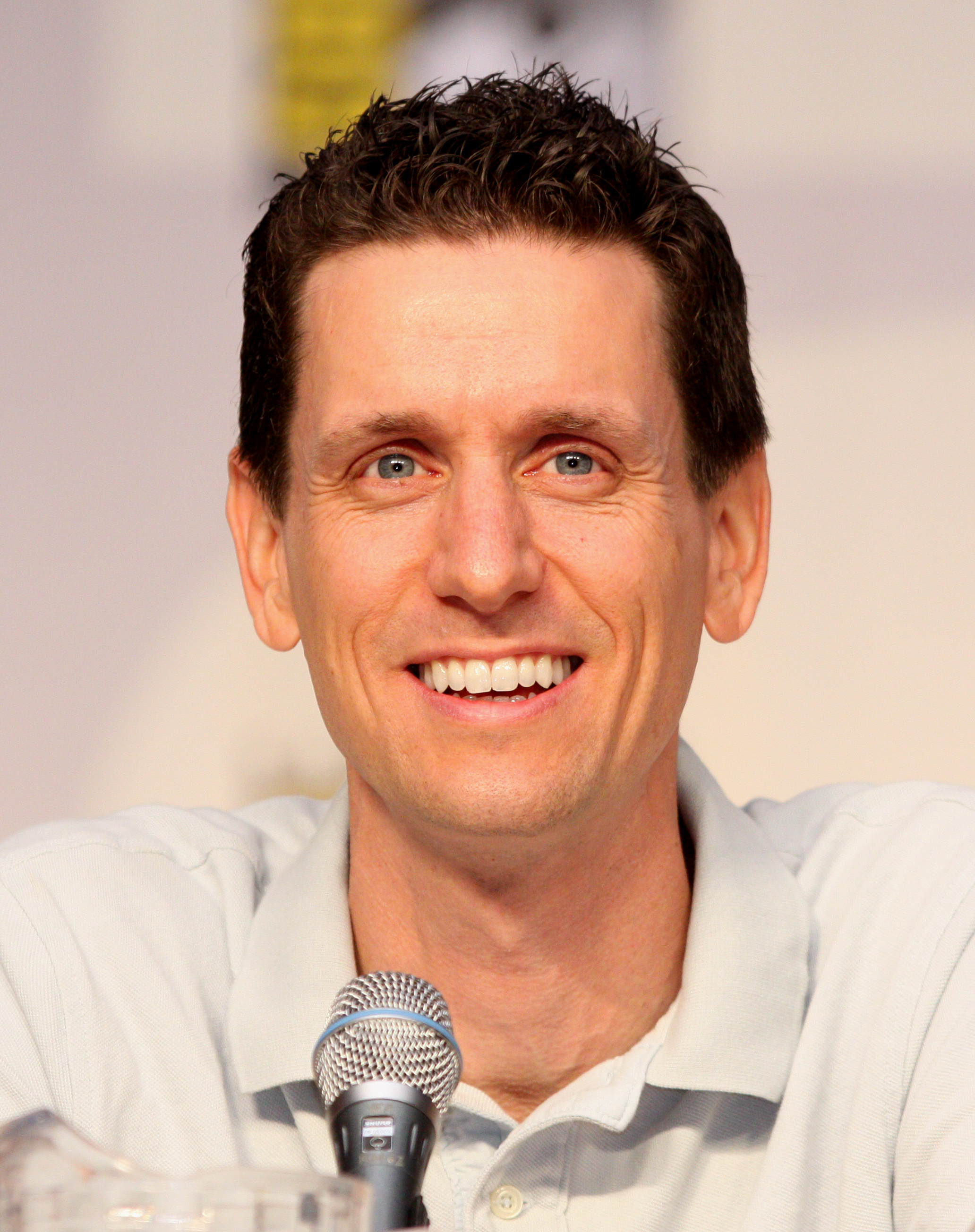
Co-executive producer, Steve Callaghan, made a minor appearance.

The episode was written by one of this season's co-executive producers Brian Scully, on his first writing job for the show. It was directed by Mike Kim, who had been with the show since its fifth season when he directed the episode "Stewie Loves Lois". Series regulars Peter Shin and James Purdum served as supervising directors for the episode. The episode's music was composed by Walter Murphy. Actors Chris Cox, Ike Barinholtz, Amanda MacDonald, Niecy Nash, Paris Hilton and Perez Hilton guest starred. Recurring voice actors for the show, including Patrick Warburton, Adam West, Johnny Brennan, writer Alec Sulkin, writer John Viener, writer Kirker Butler, co-executive producer Steve Callaghan, co-executive producer Mark Hentemann and executive producer Danny Smith also made minor appearances.

"I Dream of Jesus", along with the first eight episodes of the seventh season were released on DVD by 20th Century Fox in the United States and Canada on June 16, 2009, one month after it had completed broadcast on television. The "Volume 7" DVD release features bonus material including deleted scenes, animatics, and commentaries for every episode.

== Cultural references ==
The episode's name is a play of the title of the NBC sitcom, I Dream of Jeannie. The scene in which Stewie and Brian destroy the record is nearly identical to a scene in the 1999 film Office Space in which the characters destroy a printer, including use of the same song (Geto Boys' "Still"). Peter makes Jesus admit that he is the messiah by threatening to urinate over albums of Christian artist Amy Grant. Peter attempts to top Jesus' story about his crucifixion during a dinner conversation with a story about how he and his friends "got wrecked on Southern Comfort" before going to see The Chronicles of Riddick. George W. Bush explains to the American people that going to war was correct because he answers to Jesus Christ, then Peter and Jesus interrupt him to disagree with him, similar to a scene in Woody Allen's 1977 film Annie Hall. Jesus is invited to the Tonight Show, hosted by Jay Leno.

Lindsay Lohan is lampooned in the episode. In the record store where Peter meets Jesus, some of the posters featured on the wall include the cover artwork for Pink Floyd's The Dark Side of the Moon, Nirvana's In Utero, R.E.M.'s Automatic for the People and Eddie Van Halen's Frankenstrat guitar.

== Reception ==
According to Nielsen ratings, "I Dream of Jesus" was the most-watched program on Fox the night it originally aired. It was watched by 8.4 million viewers, and earned a 4.3/10 ratings share in the 18–49 demographic. Richard Keller of TV Squad praised the "Surfin' Bird" and Office Space parody segments. Ahsan Haque of IGN rated the episode a 7/10, claiming the episode had entertaining moments, but was not one of the show's strongest efforts. Haque wrote, "Jesus on Family Guy should have been a big deal and featured far more laughs than it did." Steve Heisler of The A.V. Club praised the "Surfin' Bird" plot but stated that the Jesus story was abrupt, adding, "There was a lot of ground Family Guy didn't tread that they wanted to". Tom Eames of entertainment website Digital Spy placed the episode at number nine on his listing of the best Family Guy episodes in order of "yukyukyuks" due its use of the "Surfin' Bird" song and quipped, "You never know when it might strike again."

Seth MacFarlane was nominated for the Primetime Emmy Award for Outstanding Voice-Over Performance for his role as Peter Griffin in this episode, MacFarlane was also nominated for the Annie Award for Voice Acting in an Animated Television Production or Short Form for his work in I Dream of Jesus, but lost to Ahmed Best for his role as Jar Jar Binks in Robot Chicken: Star Wars Episode II. According to Seth MacFarlane, "I Dream of Jesus" was one of three episodes (along with "Road to Germany" and "Family Gay") submitted for consideration for "Outstanding Comedy Series" in the 61st Primetime Emmy Awards in 2009. He explained, "We picked three of our edgier shows as a choice. We figured if we are going to be damned, let's be damned for what we really are." The series was ultimately nominated for the award, the first time an animated series was nominated for the same category since the ABC sitcom The Flintstones in 1961.
