= Road to Rhode Island =

- Family Guy episode
- Episode no.: Season 2 Episode 13
- Directed by: Dan Povenmire
- Written by: Gary Janetti
- Production code: 2ACX12
- Original air date: May 30, 2000

Guest appearances
- Victoria Principal as Dr. Amanda Rebecca; Danny Smith as various characters; Brian Doyle-Murray as Luke; Wally Wingert as various characters

Episode chronology
← Previous "Fifteen Minutes of Shame"	Next → "Let's Go to the Hop"
- Family Guy season 2

"Road to Rhode Island" is the 13th episode of the second season, and the first episode of the Road to ... series, of the American animated television series Family Guy, and the 20th episode overall. It originally aired on Fox in the United States on May 30, 2000. In the episode, Brian volunteers to bring Stewie home from his grandparents' house in Palm Springs, but the pair miss their flight and must embark on a cross-country journey home. Meanwhile, Peter becomes addicted to watching a series of marriage counselling videos hosted by a porn star.

The episode was directed by Dan Povenmire and was written by Gary Janetti. It guest-starred Victoria Principal as Dr. Amanda Rebecca, Danny Smith and Wally Wingert as various characters. Series creator Seth MacFarlane conceived the idea for this episode, and was inspired by the 1940s Road to... series of comedy films which starred Bing Crosby, Bob Hope, and Dorothy Lamour. The episode received universal acclaim from television critics. It was nominated for an Emmy Award for Outstanding Animated Program (for Programming Less than One Hour)".

== Plot ==
In a flashback set seven years earlier, Brian is born in a puppy mill near Austin, Texas and taken from his mother. In the present, Brian tells his psychiatrist about the experience. At home, he then volunteers to pick up Stewie from his grandparents' summer home in Palm Springs, California, where Stewie frames a maid for theft to amuse himself at dinner.

At the airport bar, Brian gets drunk and, when Stewie comes to find him, their unattended bags are stolen, with the plane tickets inside. They stop at a decrepit motel, where Stewie tries calling home, but fails because he believes the phone number is 867-5309. The next day, they have to escape their room and hotwire a car due to their credit card being declined. To get home, Stewie and Brian masquerade as crop dusters to steal a plane, which they immediately destroy in the attempt to take off. Eventually, they visit the Texan puppy mill after sharing transport with some Mexican stowaways and discover Brian’s mother has died; her carcass being stuffed and used as a table. A horrified Brian decides to take her remains and bury them in a nearby park. They complete their journey home riding in a boxcar of a train in which the two of them perform a musical duet.

Meanwhile, Lois urges Peter to watch relationship videos with her, but the videos turn out to be pornography hosted by Dr. Amanda Rebecca, who strips after asking the women to leave the room. Peter becomes addicted to the videos, much to Lois'chagrin. She gets herself on the end of one of the tapes in black lingerie and entices Peter. While kissing, Peter rewinds the tape, playing the part of Lois removing her robe repeatedly.

When Stewie and Brian return home, Lois asks Stewie about the trip, and Stewie covers up for Brian by saying the trip was "Smooth sailing through calm seas". As Lois leaves, Brian thanks Stewie for covering for him, and asks if there is anything he can do to repay him. At first, it appears that Stewie wishes to make him his servant by providing an example with an episode of The Brady Bunch, although it turns out that Stewie wants Brian to tape that episode for him.

== Production ==
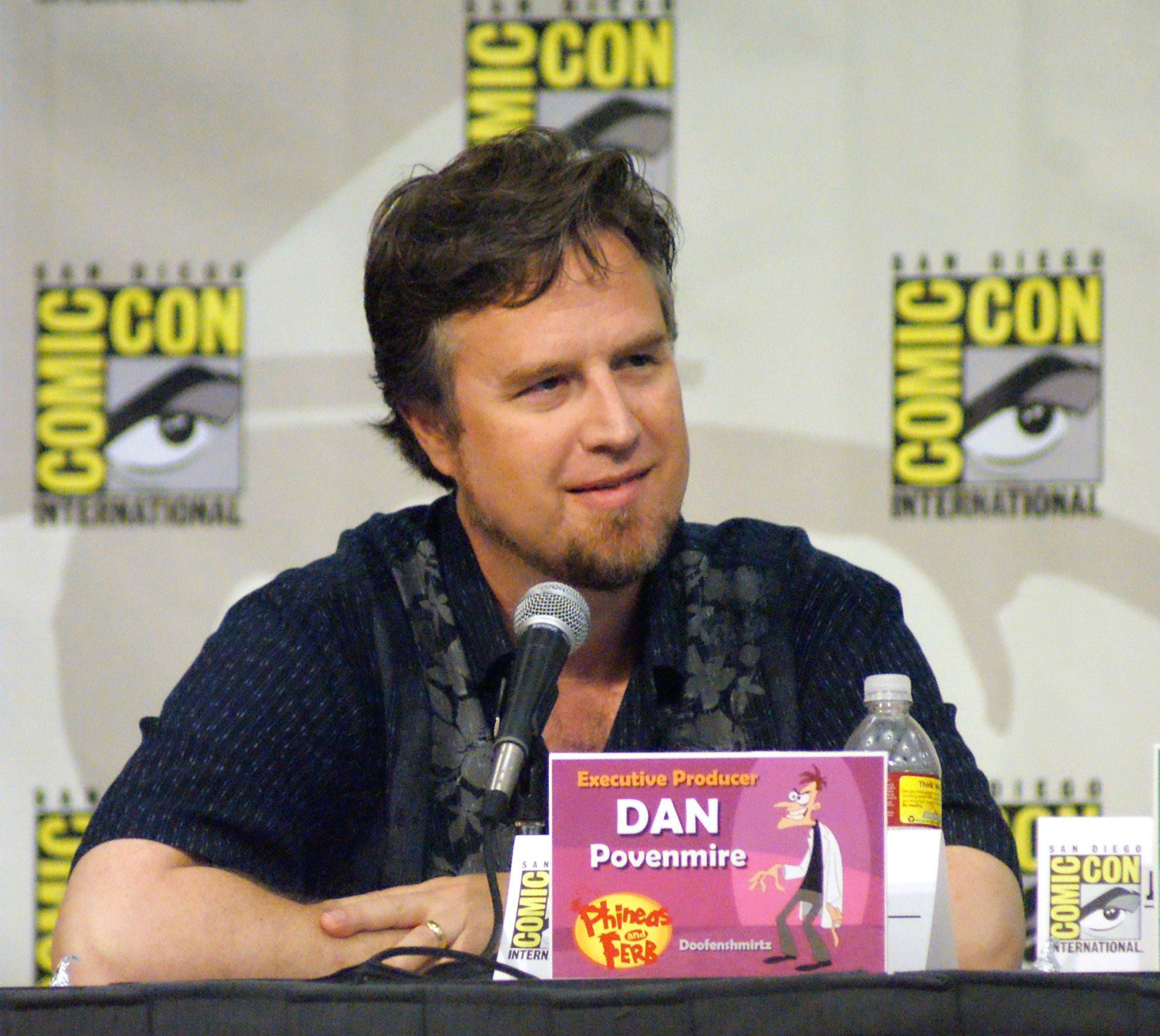
"Road to Rhode Island" was the first episode to be directed by Dan Povenmire.

"Road to Rhode Island" was directed by Dan Povenmire and was written by Gary Janetti. It featured guest appearances from Victoria Principal as Dr. Amanda Rebecca, Danny Smith and Wally Wingert as various characters. This was the first episode directed by Povenmire. Family Guy creator Seth MacFarlane granted Povenmire substantial creative freedom for directing episodes. Povenmire said that MacFarlane would tell him, "We've got two minutes to fill. Give me some visual gags. Do whatever you want. I trust you." Povenmire praised MacFarlane's management style for letting him have fun. Several years after the episode was written, in DVD commentary for the eighth and ninth season of the show, Gary Janetti, the writer of the episode, recalled that the original title of the episode was intended to be simply "Brian & Stewie", but was changed by series creator and executive producer Seth MacFarlane, who wanted there to be a "Road to" episode each season. The name of the episode was then changed to "Road to Rhode Island", with the original name later being used for the landmark 150th episode of the show, also entitled "Brian & Stewie", and written by Janetti.

This is the first episode of the "Road to" episodes of the series which air through various seasons of the show. The episodes are a parody of the seven "Road to" comedy films starring Bing Crosby, Bob Hope, and Dorothy Lamour. MacFarlane, a fan of the film series, came up with the idea. The musical number in the episode is sung to the tune of "(We're Off on the) Road to Morocco" from the film Road to Morocco.

=== Edits ===
During the airport section of the episode, there is a scene that was subsequently cut from some editions/airings of the show, involving Osama bin Laden. In the scene, Stewie, when approaching airport security, realizes that his bag is full of weapons. He breaks into song, singing "On the Good Ship Lollipop" to distract the X-ray scanners. He then says, "Let's hope Osama bin Laden doesn't know show tunes." At that time, Osama is pictured in another line, distracting the scanners by singing "I Hope I Get It" from A Chorus Line. Even though the episode aired a year and a half before 9/11, it was still controversial, and was cut on the Family Guy: Volume 1 DVD in the US. However, the scene was left intact on Hulu from 2018 onwards and the "Freakin' Sweet Collection".

== Reception ==
In his 2009 review, Ahsan Haque of IGN, rating the episode 10/10, praised the episode, saying: "Great writing, hilarious jokes, a catchy musical, and a story that's both hilarious and touching at the same time – Family Guy doesn't get much better than this." It is one of the only three Family Guy episodes that has ever been given a "Masterpiece" (10/10) rating by IGN, the other being "I Never Met the Dead Man" and "Da Boom". IGN also placed the episode at the top of their list of "Stewie and Brian's Greatest Adventures", and again in the list of "Top 20 Family Guy episodes" to celebrate the show's 20th anniversary.

The episode was nominated for an Emmy Award for Outstanding Animated Program (For Programming less than One Hour), but lost to The Simpsons episode "Behind the Laughter".

Tom Eames of entertainment website Digital Spy placed the episode at number thirteen on his listing of the best Family Guy episodes in order of "yukyukyuks" and despite describing the episode as "hilarious", he said that Brian discovering his mother's body was "ultra emotional" and "one of the rare emotionally-charged moments in the show." He added that he "can never get enough" of Brian and Stewie and their bromance.
