= Road to Germany =

- Family Guy episode
- The episode's promotional art
- Episode no.: Season 7 Episode 3
- Directed by: Greg Colton
- Written by: Patrick Meighan
- Production code: 6ACX08
- Original air date: October 19, 2008

Guest appearances
- Brian Blessed as Prince Vultan; Robert Boomfield; Gregory Jbara as German General, German Soldier, and German Priest; Martin Savage; Al Thompson as African American Tree; Jeff Witzke

Episode chronology
← Previous "I Dream of Jesus"	Next → "Baby Not on Board"
- Family Guy season 7

"Road to Germany" is the third episode of the seventh season (and the fourth episode in the Road to... series) of the American animated television series Family Guy. It originally aired on the Fox network in the United States on October 19, 2008. In the episode, Mort accidentally enters Stewie's time machine and is sent to Warsaw, Poland, on September 1, 1939. Brian and Stewie realize Mort has gone back in time, and use the time machine to save him.

The episode was written by Patrick Meighan and directed by Greg Colton. Brian Blessed, Gregory Jbara, Martin Savage, Jeff Witzke and Robert Boomfield guest star in the episode. "Road to Germany" was seen by approximately 9.07 million viewers during its original broadcast, and received positive reviews from television critics. In 2009, the episode, along with "I Dream of Jesus" and "Family Gay", received an Emmy Award nomination for "Outstanding Comedy Series".

== Plot ==
While the neighbors are watching the Oscars at the Griffins' house, Mort needs to use the bathroom so desperately after taking laxatives that he runs into what he thinks is a portable toilet in Stewie's room. Instead, it turns out to be Stewie's new time machine, and Mort is sent to the past. Realizing that Mort does not have a return pad, a device necessary to bring the user back to the present, Stewie and Brian take the return pad and go back in time to save Mort. They end up in Warsaw, Poland, and find Mort in a synagogue. He believes he is in Heaven because he sees dead family members there. It does not take long for them to realize that the date is September 1, 1939, the day of the Nazi invasion of Poland when World War II started.

They cannot return to the present right away because the return pad to Stewie's time machine fails to activate. They decide to go to England where Mort, who is Jewish, will be safe from the Nazis. While attempting to cross the border, Mort, who was disguised as a Catholic priest, was asked to do the last rites for a dead soldier. When the actual priest arrives, the German officers find out that Mort is Jewish, resulting in the trio being chased by the Nazis. Mort, Stewie, and Brian make their escape on a motorbike in a Back to the Future parody, followed by an elaborate undersea pursuit in a hijacked U-boat, making it to England safely.

Stewie examines the return pad and discovers the uranium rod used to power the device is depleted; the only accessible source of uranium in 1939 is the nuclear weapons testing facility in Berlin, Nazi Germany. To get to Germany, Stewie, Mort, and Brian join the Royal Air Force and fly a Lancaster bomber in a dogfight against a squadron of Luftwaffe Messerschmitt Bf 109 fighters, eventually reaching Berlin. After finding the nuclear research lab, Stewie disguises himself as Adolf Hitler, while Mort and Brian disguise themselves as Nazi officers. They obtain a uranium rod from former NFL player Joe Greene, and run into the real Hitler, who orders their execution. Brian and Stewie distract him long enough for Mort to insert the uranium into the return pad, and the trio escapes back to their time.

The group arrives in Stewie's room 30 seconds before Mort enters the time machine. To keep Mort from ever finding out about his time machine, Stewie kills the Mort that traveled with them by shoving him into the machine and then blowing it up with a raygun. The original Mort then enters the room and, now lacking the "toilet", he ends up soiling himself instead.

== Production ==
"Road to Germany" is the third episode of Family Guy´s seventh season. It was written by Patrick Meighan who had written "Road to Rupert". The episode was directed by series regular Greg Colton, who had worked on "Brian Goes Back to College", "No Meals on Wheels" and also "8 Simple Rules for Buying My Teenage Daughter". Peter Shin and James Purdun acted as supervising directors. John Viener worked as an executive story editor. Seth MacFarlane, Chris Sheridan, David A. Goodman and Danny Smith were executive producers. Alec Sulkin, Wellesley Wild and Mike Henry acted as supervising producers. Richard Appel, Brian Scully, Mark Hentemann and Steve Callaghan worked as co-executive producers. After reading the script aloud, Jewish executive producer David A. Goodman said, "I'm going to get kicked out of my temple".

"Road to Germany" is the fourth episode of the Road to hallmarks of the series, which have aired in various seasons of the show, and the first to be directed by Colton. The episodes are a parody of the seven Road to... comedy films starring Bing Crosby, Bob Hope, and Dorothy Lamour. The director, Dan Povenmire, who directed every previous Road to episodes, left Family Guy soon after, following the conclusion of the fifth season, to create his own series, entitled Phineas and Ferb, which has since been nominated for seven Emmy Awards.

"Road to Germany", along with the first eight episodes of the seventh season were released on DVD by 20th Century Fox in the United States and Canada on June 16, 2009, one month after it had completed broadcast on television. The "Volume 7" DVD release features bonus material including deleted scenes, animatics, and commentaries for every episode.

== Cultural references ==
The episode begins with a swing band version of the orchestral theme from the 1980s miniseries The Winds of War and War and Remembrance. The entrance into Warsaw mirrors Marty McFly's arrival in 1955 in Hill Valley. When Brian, Stewie, and Mort are chased by Nazis, a recreation of the chase scene, including Alan Silvestri's music, from Back to the Future occurs where Stewie rides a makeshift skateboard, escapes, and has the Nazis crash into a truck of manure.

When Stewie picks up a Nazi uniform, there is a McCain–Palin button attached. Stewie and Hitler re-enact the famous mirror scene from the Marx Brothers film Duck Soup. The U-boat sequence is an adaptation of U-571 when Stewie decides to throw trash out of the submarine in order to stop the U-boat that was chasing them. Furthermore, the U-boat crashing scene is a reference to the multiple police car chases and subsequent crashes from The Blues Brothers. The submarine scene also features a melody of "Wishing Well" by Terence Trent D'Arby. The scene where the Hawk Men defeat the Luftwaffe is a parody of the film Flash Gordon, with its original soundtrack by Queen and Brian Blessed reprising his role as Prince Vultan. Stewie, Brian and Mort's escape from their crashing plane is a recreation of the raft scene from Indiana Jones and the Temple of Doom, including the track from the film's score by John Williams. The Hebrew wedding scene plays a song titled "Through Poland to Jewish Village", again from The Winds of War. The scene in the uranium lab where the scientist shows Stewie "one hundred Luftballons" followed by one popping is a reference to the song "99 Luftballons" where 99 red balloons trigger a nuclear war.

== Reception ==
In its original broadcast in the United States on October 19, 2008, "Road to Germany" was watched by 9.07 million viewers and was the most watched show in Fox's Animation Domination block that night, beating The Simpsons, American Dad! and King of the Hill. The episode acquired a 4.7 Nielsen rating in the 18–49 demographic, finishing second in its timeslot after ABC's Desperate Housewives. The episode also acquired a 6.1 rating in the 18–34 demographic, finishing first in its timeslot.

"Road to Germany" received positive reviews. Ahsan Haque of IGN rated the episode 9.6 saying, "Featuring gorgeous CGI animation, a genuinely exciting storyline, and some hilariously offensive humor, this Stewie and Brian centric episode of Family Guy easily stands out as one of the best episodes of the show in years." Alex Rocha of TV Guide was much more critical stating, "it seemed that the show has taken a slight fall back. After having great episodes the past few weeks to get this current season started on a roll, we have witnessed another average, even sub-par episode." In his review of Family Guy, volume 8, Francis Rizzo III of DVD Talk called the episode "hugely memorable", and stated that it "features some of the finest animation the series has ever produced".

According to Seth MacFarlane, "Road to Germany" was one of three episodes (along with "I Dream of Jesus" and "Family Gay") submitted for consideration for "Outstanding Comedy Series" in the 61st Primetime Emmy Awards in 2009. "We picked three of our edgier shows as a choice," he explained, "Ya know, we figured if we are going to be damned, let's be damned for what we really are." The series was ultimately nominated for the award, the first time in 48 years an animated series was nominated for the same category.
