= Road to the North Pole =

- Family Guy episode
- The image displays the title of the episode "Road to the North Pole" as the episode starts.
- Episode no.: Season 9 Episode 7
- Directed by: Greg Colton
- Written by: Chris Sheridan; Danny Smith
- Production code: 8ACX08-09
- Original air date: December 12, 2010

Guest appearances
- Ron MacFarlane as himself and the narrator; Drew Barrymore as Jillian; H. Jon Benjamin as Carl; David Boreanaz as the Aurora Boreanaz; Karley Scott Collins as Abby and Little Girl; Carrie Fisher as Angela; Bruce McGill as Santa Claus; Will Ryan as Winnie-the-Pooh; John Viener as Eeyore; Nana Visitor as Mother

Episode chronology
← Previous "Brian Writes a Bestseller"	Next → "New Kidney in Town"
- Family Guy season 9

"Road to the North Pole" is the seventh episode of the ninth season of the animated comedy series Family Guy. Directed by Greg Colton and co-written by Chris Sheridan and Danny Smith, the episode originally aired on Fox in the United States on December 12, 2010. In "Road to the North Pole", Stewie and Brian go on an adventure to the North Pole so that Stewie can kill Santa Claus. They discover a dreary, polluting factory full of inbred elves and carnivorous, feral reindeer, along with a sickly, exhausted and suicidal Santa. Stewie and Brian take pity on him and decide to fulfill Christmas by delivering gifts to the entire globe, albeit unsuccessfully.

The "Road to" episodes have aired through the various seasons of Family Guy were inspired by the Road to... comedy films starring Bing Crosby, Bob Hope and Dorothy Lamour, though this episode was not originally conceived as a "Road to" show. The episode is the second Family Guy Christmas special after the season three episode "A Very Special Family Guy Freakin' Christmas", also written by Danny Smith. It was first announced at the 2010 San Diego Comic-Con.

Critical responses to the episode were mostly positive; critics praised its storyline and its numerous cultural references, although it also received criticism from the Parents Television Council. According to Nielsen ratings, it was viewed in 8.03 million homes during its original airing in the United States. The episode featured guest performances by Drew Barrymore, H. Jon Benjamin, David Boreanaz, Carrie Fisher, and Karley Scott Collins, along with several recurring guest voice actors for the series. It is narrated by Ron MacFarlane, Seth MacFarlane's father. It was nominated for 3 Emmy Awards: Outstanding Music Composition for a Series, Outstanding Original Music and Lyrics and Outstanding Sound Mixing for a Comedy or Drama Series (Half-Hour) and Animation. It later won for Outstanding Sound Mixing for a Comedy or Drama Series (Half-Hour) and Animation. The song "Christmastime Is Killing Us" was nominated for a Grammy Award for Best Song Written for Visual Media.

== Plot ==
On Christmas Eve, Brian takes Stewie to the mall, only to get a rude brush-off from the Santa who works there. Stewie vows to kill Santa and tries to force Brian to take him to the North Pole.

Stewie hitches a ride with a trucker and so Brian follows him to Canada. On the way, Stewie accidentally causes a traffic pileup by discharging a flare pistol in the cab of the truck, which catches fire and explodes. Crashing his car in a chain reaction, Brian becomes angry and tells Stewie that Santa does not exist. Stewie becomes frustrated and continues to attempt to hitchhike, coercing Brian to join him. The pair encounter a Canadian who gives them his snowmobile.

Continuing north, they run out of gas, but receive help from the Aurora Boreanaz, who instructs them to stay at a nearby cabin. The two set out on foot the next morning. They make it to Santa's workshop, only to find the place a gloomy factory in a polluted, lifeless wasteland. Santa is a sickly, exhausted, and depressed old man, the elves are mutated and inbred due to Santa's attempts to keep up with the increasing gift demand year after year, and the reindeer are carnivorous, feral monsters that eat the elves who wander out into the snow to die of exhaustion. Santa suddenly collapses and is too sick to deliver the presents. Brian and Stewie agree to do it, but they waste an hour and a half at their first house with Stewie killing a father and mother and duct-taping up their young daughter, only to discover they were in the wrong house the whole time. Realizing that they will not complete the deliveries in time and understanding the impossibility of Santa's job, Stewie and Brian abandon this for another plan.

On Christmas morning, everybody on Earth wakes up without any presents under their trees. All the TV news networks are broadcasting the same story: Brian and Stewie appear on the broadcast and bring the dying Santa out in a wheelchair, explaining that humanity's greed is killing him, and if they do not lessen their demands to one Christmas present a year, they may have to abandon Christmas. Chastened, everyone agrees; one year later, Santa has recovered, the workshop is once again a lively, colorful cottage, and the elves and reindeer are rejuvenated.

== Production and development ==
"Road to the North Pole" is the sixth episode of the "Road to" episodes of the series which air through various seasons of the show. It was directed by Family Guy veteran Greg Colton, this being the first episode he has directed since the eighth-season episode "Go Stewie, Go." This is also Colton's third "Road to" episode, the first being "Road to Germany" and the second being "Road to the Multiverse." The episode was written by Chris Sheridan and Danny Smith, this being the first Smith wrote since "Partial Terms of Endearment," and his first "Road to" episode. It included staff writers Alex Carter, Andrew Goldberg and Elaine Ko. It is an hour-long special with three musical numbers. Ron MacFarlane, Seth MacFarlane's father, served as the episode's narrator. This is also the first "Road to" episode to be composed by Ron Jones.

Two of the musical numbers, "All I Really Want for Christmas" and "Christmastime is Killing Us" were released as digital downloads on iTunes. "Christmastime is Killing Us" was available on December 3, 2010, while "All I Really Want for Christmas" was made available on December 10, 2010.

In addition to the regular cast, the episode also guest-starred actress Drew Barrymore, voice actor H. Jon Benjamin, actor David Boreanaz, actress Karley Scott Collins, actress Carrie Fisher, actor Ron MacFarlane, father of series creator and executive producer Seth MacFarlane, actor Bruce McGill, voice actor Will Ryan, voice actress Tara Strong and actress Nana Visitor. Recurring guest voice actors John G. Brennan, actor Chris Cox, actor Ralph Garman, writer Chris Sheridan, writer Danny Smith, writer Alec Sulkin, actress Jennifer Tilly, writer J. Lee, and writer John Viener also made minor appearances.

== Cultural references ==
This episode as well as the entire "Road to" series in Family Guy is a parody of the seven Road to... comedy films that were released from 1940 to 1962, starring actors Bing Crosby, Bob Hope and actress Dorothy Lamour. The opening credits show images with Brian and Stewie referencing other Christmas specials such as The Nutcracker, A Christmas Carol, How the Grinch Stole Christmas, Frosty the Snowman and Home Alone. The credits also show Brian and Stewie performing winter activities, such as snowball fights, making snow angels, and putting coal in Meg's Christmas stocking. Ron MacFarlane, who narrated part of the episode, mentioned that Kenny Rogers was supposed to be there.

The episode opens with a musical number in which the members of Quahog sing about what they want for Christmas. Peter wishes to have actress and models Jessica Biel and Megan Fox, and lunch with Michael Landon's ghost. Chris wishes for Jennifer Garner and Meg wishes for a pink Lexus. Other residents of Quahog also wish for gifts: Herbert wishes for a drummer boy (while looking at a picture of singer Nick Jonas), Mayor Adam West wishes for a tinkertoy, Carl wishes for a Blu-ray version of The Wiz and Consuela wishes for more Lemon Pledge. Mort (who is Jewish) says he will sue if they put a Christmas tree in the airport. The song ends with various characters appearing in an advent calendar.

Brian and Stewie go to the mall so they can meet Santa, but Peter is asking Santa for gifts (he asks for a game of Uno, a Magna Doodle, a pet chink (a mix of a chinchilla and a mink) and a Charles in Charge lunchbox.) When the mall Santa leaves for the night and Brian demands that he let Stewie sit in his lap, Santa mentions he will be at Applebee's. Stewie says that Santa leaving before he got a chance to sit in his lap felt like a bigger betrayal than the betrayal of Gary Busey by reality; this takes us to Busey looking at himself in the mirror asking his reflection, in the form of a crazed clown, how he is doing.

Brian and Stewie decide to go to the North Pole to kill Santa, but Brian does not want Stewie to get disappointed if Santa is not what everybody thinks he is; to this, Stewie responds that Brian is as negative as Eeyore from Winnie-the-Pooh. To prevent Stewie from going to the North Pole he tells him that Santa is not real; Stewie questions this, also asking if Elmo, SpongeBob SquarePants and Curious George aren't real. On their way to the North Pole, Brian and Stewie find themselves in Canada, where they meet a man with a thick Canadian accent; they also see the Aurora borealis and the Aurora Boreanaz (an aurora with David Boreanaz's face).

When they finally get to the North Pole and find it polluted and lifeless, Stewie compares it to Bridgeport, Connecticut; thus resulting in a cutaway to a Bridgeport resident writing an angry letter to the Family Guy writer staff about Stewie's comment. When Santa Claus is near death, he shocks Stewie by saying "I'll be with Allah soon". When Brian and Stewie decide to deliver the presents for Santa, in their travel the Statue of Liberty can be seen. Unfortunately, they are not able to deliver the presents, and the next morning the residents of Quahog are upset because they have no presents, but Mort says he got eight mediocre gifts.

== Reception ==
"The Road to the North Pole, which is my favorite Family Guy episode in several seasons. This may be due to my Christmas bias, but I don't think so. Outside of a strange segment where Stewie and Brian, filling in for Santa in true sitcom Christmas plot fashion, kill an entire family, the episode is a good blend of solid gags, a fun story, and the kinds of envelope-pushing stuff Family Guy rarely does this well. The musical numbers, which have often been annoying in the past, are all nicely staged and performed (particularly the opening one, which closes with all of the characters being revealed in a big Advent calendar), and the episode's moral, while a little simplistic, is genuinely sweet".

— Emily VanDerWerff, The A.V. Club

"Road to the North Pole" was broadcast on December 12, 2010, as a part of an animated television night on Fox, and was preceded by The Simpsons, and followed by Family Guy creator and executive producer Seth MacFarlane's second show, American Dad!. It was watched by 8.03 million viewers, according to Nielsen ratings, despite airing simultaneously with the Desperate Housewives on ABC, The Amazing Race and Undercover Boss on CBS and Sunday Night Football on NBC. The episode also acquired a 3.9 rating in the 18–49 demographic, beating American Dad! and The Simpsons in addition to significantly edging out both shows in total viewership. The episode's ratings increased significantly from the previous week's episode.

The episode was met with a generally positive response from critics. Emily VanDerWerff of The A.V. Club gave "Road to the North Pole" a positive review, stating that it is "a satisfying episode of Family Guy all around, filled with funny gags and nice moments." She especially praised the musical segments, and the portrayal of the North Pole, writing that "the way the episode kept piling more and more ridiculous horrors on top of each other kept the whole thing funny." She rated the episode an "A−". Jason Hughes of TV Squad also praised the songs and the depiction of Santa's factory, though he found the delivery of the episode's message "heavy-handed." Kate Moon of TV Fanatic gave the episode 3.6 out of 5 stars. She said, "I had mixed feelings about this one, despite its clever moments and hopeful ending. While I normally have no problems about Family Guy's shocking or offensive themes, I felt bit disconcerted about the direction of this Christmas episode." She went on to say, "Perhaps it was the way that the series stomped on something as innocent as Santa and his elves and twisted them all around. Or perhaps it was the cannibalistic reindeer. Whatever the specific reason, the irreverent nature of Family Guy seemed just a little too graphic for me this time around." Tom Eames of entertainment website Digital Spy placed the episode at number twelve on his listing of the best Family Guy episodes in order of "yukyukyuks" and described the episode as "Christmas comedy gold", praising the 'Christmastime is Killing Us' song and Boreanaz's cameo.

The episode was also nominated for Outstanding Music Composition for a Series, Outstanding Original Music and Lyrics (for song "Christmastime Is Killing Us", written by Ron Jones, Seth MacFarlane, and Danny Smith) and Outstanding Sound Mixing for a Comedy or Drama Series (Half-Hour) and Animation (Patrick S. Clark and Jim Fitzpatrick). It won for Outstanding Sound Mixing for a Comedy or Drama Series (Half-Hour) and Animation.

The series was successfully nominated in 2009 but failed to merit an award. Mark Hentemann, executive producer and showrunner of Family Guy said of the nominating process, "We had internal discussions in the writers' room, and it seemed like we were much more akin to the other primetime comedies than we were to children's shows in animation. We assumed we would not get anywhere, and so it was a great surprise when we got the nomination."

"Christmastime Is Killing Us" was nominated for Best Song Written for a Visual Media at the 54th Grammy Awards.
