= (We're Off on the) Road to Morocco =

Song by Bing Crosby and Bob Hope
- Released: 1942
- Composer: Jimmy Van Heusen
- Lyricist: Johnny Burke

"(We're Off on the) Road to Morocco" is a song composed in 1942 by Jimmy Van Heusen, with lyrics by Johnny Burke, for the film Road to Morocco, in which it was performed by Bing Crosby and Bob Hope. Crosby recorded a solo version of the song, with different lyrics, on June 10, 1942, accompanied by Vic Schoen and his orchestra. Later, on December 8, 1944, Crosby and Hope recorded a duet version that briefly reached the No. 21 position in the Billboard in July 1945.

The song was included as #95 in AFI's 100 Years...100 Songs.

The song was also recorded by Rosemary Clooney and Jack Sheldon for Clooney's 1994 album Still on the Road.

== In popular culture ==
The song has been parodied several times in media, particularly in animated series:

- In the 1996 Duckman episode "The Road to Dendron"; a spoof of the same name is sung by the characters Duckman and Cornfed. The episode is a parody of and homage to Road to Morocco and the broader Road to ... series.
- In the 2000 Family Guy episode "Road to Rhode Island"; a spoof of the same name is sung by the characters Brian and Stewie. Like Duckman, this episode also parodies/pays homage to the Road to ... series, and the spoof uses the same tune as the original.
- In the 2018 My Little Pony: Friendship is Magic episode "Road to Friendship"; a spoof entitled "We're Friendship Bound" is sung by the characters Starlight Glimmer and Trixie.
