= Road to Rupert =

- Family Guy episode
- Episode no.: Season 5 Episode 9
- Directed by: Dan Povenmire
- Written by: Patrick Meighan
- Production code: 5ACX04
- Original air date: January 28, 2007

Guest appearances
- Max Burkholder as Timmy Cordray; Phil LaMarr as Black Guy in Gettysburg; Rob Lowe as Stanford Cordray; Ted McGinley; Stephen Stanton; Connor Trinneer as Victim of Sharon Stone; Audrey Wasilewski; George Wendt as Norm Peterson; Dave Wittenberg as Woody Boyd; Gene Kelly (archive footage) as Joseph "Joe" Brady

Episode chronology
← Previous "Barely Legal"	Next → "Peter's Two Dads"
- Family Guy season 5

"Road to Rupert" is the ninth episode of the fifth season of Family Guy. It originally aired on Fox in the United States on January 28, 2007. It is the third episode in the Road to... series of episodes in Family Guy. The episode follows Stewie after Brian accidentally sells Stewie's beloved teddy bear, Rupert, during a yard sale. In an attempt to retrieve him, Stewie and Brian discover that the family Rupert was sold to are former neighbours who had since moved to Aspen, Colorado. As a result, Stewie and Brian travel across the United States to get Rupert back. Meanwhile, Peter has his driving license revoked for careless driving and is forced to be driven around by Meg, which annoys him.

The episode was written by Patrick Meighan and directed by Dan Povenmire. It received divided reviews, with Meg and Peter's plot criticized, while Stewie and Brian's plot garnered praise. According to Nielsen ratings, it was viewed in 8.8 million homes in its original airing. The episode feature guest performances by Max Burkholder, Phil LaMarr, Rob Lowe, Ted McGinley, Stephen Stanton, Connor Trinneer, Audrey Wasilewski, George Wendt and Dave Wittenberg. It features archive music of the "Campfire Song Song" from the SpongeBob SquarePants episode "The Camping Episode".

"Road to Rupert" was the third and final Road to... episode directed by Dan Povenmire, as he had left to create Phineas and Ferb (2007–2015) with Jeff "Swampy" Marsh.

== Plot ==
The Griffins have a yard sale to sell off household items that they no longer need, but Brian accidentally sells Stewie's teddy bear, Rupert, causing Stewie to think Rupert has been kidnapped. Brian takes Stewie to the toy store to try to find a replacement, but ends up admitting he accidentally sold it, much to Stewie's anger. He attempts to retrieve Rupert by tracking DNA samples against the federal database from the money Brian was paid for Rupert. They discover the man who bought Rupert lives in Quahog, but upon arrival, they discover the house is deserted. They then see a moving truck leaving the house and follow it, with Mayor West driving. West stops at the Connecticut state line, driving them no further. West states his reasoning for this, saying "If I enter Connecticut, I'm entering every state that Connecticut's ever been with", and wishes the pair good luck. After a box falls out of the moving truck, they discover the buyer, Stanford Cordray (Rob Lowe), now resides in Aspen, Colorado. At this point, Stewie and Brian are on their own. To get over the mountains, the pair rent a helicopter after Stewie performs a dance for the man in the office (with help from Gene Kelly) in lieu of cash or card payments, but when Brian crashes the helicopter into the mountain, the two end up next to the entrance to Aspen.

Refusing to give Rupert back to Stewie, Stanford and his family organize a skiing race down the mountain, so if Stewie is the first down, he and Brian are allowed to take Rupert away with them and if Stanford wins, he can keep Brian. Stewie cheats by installing rockets in his skis, but then crashes into a tree and loses the race. Not wanting to lose either Brian or Rupert, Stewie has his personal butler Crohn throw a cup of hot tea on Stanford's son Timmy's face, forcing him to drop the bear. The two grab Rupert and make a run for it, and carjack a passing driver at gunpoint in the city and drive the 2112 miles back to Quahog.

Meanwhile, Peter purchased his own Evel Knievel gloves at his own yard sale. He decides to use the family car to jump over a row of cars, but is unsuccessful and results in his drivers license being revoked by Joe. Lois arranges for Meg to become Peter's personal driver, and he makes numerous attempts to annoy Meg. One night, while driving home from the Drunken Clam with his friends, Peter lights Meg's hat on fire, which Quagmire then puts out by dumping a can of beer on her head, causing Meg to be extremely angry. When another car rear ends her and she is insulted by the driver, Meg takes out her repressed rage with Peter on the driver by beating him up; Peter is impressed, and the two bond in the car. In the end, Joe stops by Peter's house to reinstate his license. Meg worries that Peter will begin treating her badly again, but Peter says that while he will only do so in front of the family to keep up appearances, and that they will now be "secret best friends".

== Production ==
This episode was written by Patrick Meighan, in his first episode of the season, and, like all "Road to..." episodes from 2000–2007, directed by Dan Povenmire, in his second episode of the season.

The scene in which Lois mocked Stewie Griffin: The Untold Story (2005) was edited on TV for time reasons. When Joe lists Peter's reckless driving offences, one of the crimes he's accused of is rape because a victim's airbag broke her hymen. A deleted version of the scene instead included a hate crime charge, due to Peter hitting a Jew. The scene of Stewie getting high on NyQuil to cope with losing Rupert and mistaking a throw pillow for a cat was cut from TV airings for time reasons. David Goodman noted that he feels the production crew may not have succeeded on this episode as everything falls into place easily, such as the box falling out of the moving truck. Every frame when Stewie is dancing in a montage of Anchors Aweigh took a large amount of work to produce.

The montage of Stewie and Brian visiting several U.S. states (with a visual gag where numerous Midwest states are depicted as identical corn fields) was a DVD exclusive scene, removed from television for timing purposes. This scene was partially based on series creator Seth MacFarlane traveling the United States after the September 11, 2001 attacks and realizing there is much corn throughout the U.S. Stewie and Brian carjacking somebody was added to the episode in a later rewrite and censored on television.

In addition to the regular cast, voice actor Max Burkholder, voice actor Phil LaMarr, actor Rob Lowe, actor Ted McGinley, voice actor Stephen Stanton, actor Connor Trinneer, voice actress Audrey Wasilewski, actor George Wendt (who voiced Norm Peterson in the episode) and voice actor Dave Wittenberg (who voiced Woody Boyd in the episode, originally played by Woody Harrelson) guest starred in the episode. Recurring guest voice actors Chris Sheridan, writer Danny Smith, writer Alec Sulkin and writer John Viener made minor appearances.

== Cultural references ==
When speaking with Brian at the yard sale, Lois comments that "Stymie Gruffin: The Untold Story [sic]" is not a real movie, but merely three individual episodes together.

The music performed at Stewie's vision of Rupert's funeral was the hymn Amazing Grace (played on the bagpipes by Brian), while the funeral itself is a reference to Spock's funeral in Star Trek II: The Wrath of Khan.

The My Black Son opening theme parodied a number of 1970s and 1980s television programs, these being A Different World, Family Ties, Punky Brewster, Laverne and Shirley, Perfect Strangers, Three's Company, Who's the Boss? and Bosom Buddies. It also co-starred Emmanuel Lewis.

After Peter crashes his car during his first car-jumping stunt, he refers to Matthew Broderick's car accident in Northern Ireland in 1987, in which two people died.

When Lois opens the refrigerator to find Peter inside, she tells him to get out. Peter says "There is no Peter, only Zuul", a reference to the 1984 film Ghostbusters.

While entering the dollar bill Brian sold the bear Rupert for into the FBI database, it can be seen as being reported that antagonist watches Cold Case, Without a Trace, and Yu-Gi-Oh!.

Peter watches an episode of SpongeBob SquarePants in the car which features "The C.A.M.P.F.I.R.E.S.O.N.G. Song" performed in the actual episode. It had been written by Dan Povenmire for the original SpongeBob episode, but it was allowed in the episode as Nickelodeon gave Family Guy permission to reproduce the music.

Hitchhiking to Colorado, Stewie and Brian catch a ride with Smokey and the Bandit co-stars and former couple Sally Field and Burt Reynolds.

Stewie's dance number with Gene Kelly employs footage from the 1945 musical film Anchors Aweigh. The reflection of the original character (Jerry Mouse from Tom and Jerry) can be slightly seen on the floor.

When Stewie and Brian crash the helicopter down the mountain and Brian visualizes Stewie as the devil, this is a reference to such a scene in Planes, Trains and Automobiles. The crash itself is caused by a sector whiteout.

The Herman's Hermits song "I'm into Something Good" is heard during a sequence of Peter's time with Meg. During this same sequence, they go to a drive in and Peter sticks his head through the roof of the car. Meg then places Pebbles & Bamm-Bamm on his head in reference to the opening credits of The Flintstones.

== Reception ==
In a slight improvement over the previous week, the episode was viewed in 8.8 million homes in its original airing, according to Nielsen ratings. The episode also acquired a 3.1 rating in the 18–49 demographic, slightly edging out both The Simpsons and American Dad!.

The episode received mixed comments from TV Squad, with Brett Love commenting that "the suspended license plot was a little thin, but that's forgivable given that this was the b-story for the episode, and there are only 22 minutes to work with." Love comments positively on the Stewie and Brian relationship in the episode, commenting that, "the Stewie and Brian story is what made the episode for me. It was very well done, right down to the goofy little details." IGN commented that, "...for Family Guy to have a great episode, it takes a good story and humorous "manatee" gags. "Road to Rupert" was able to deliver on both these fronts, with the majority of the episode's attention focused on Stewie and Brian's road story, meshed with many laugh out loud gags."
