= Road to Morocco =

1942 film by David Butler

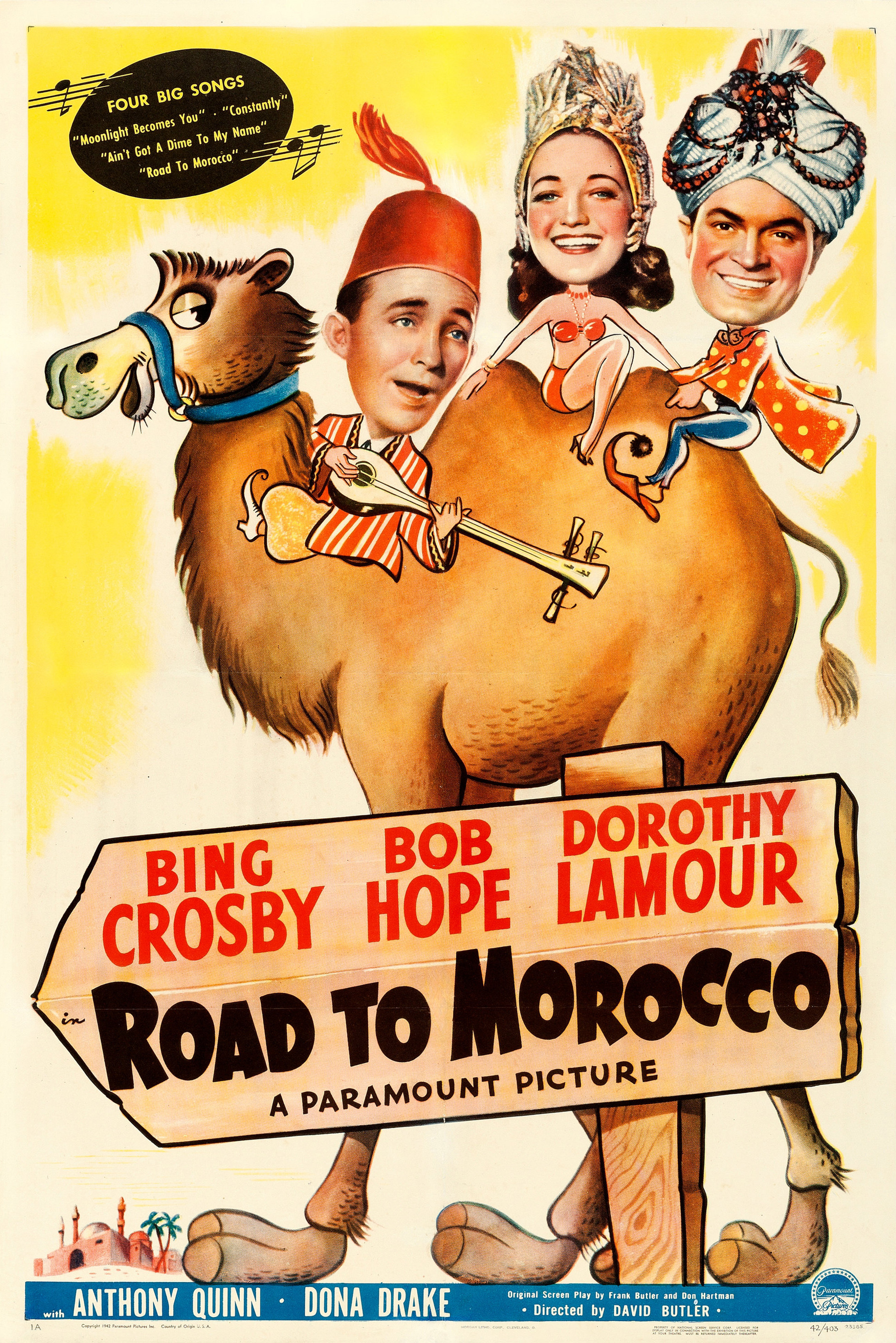
- Theatrical release poster
- Directed by: David Butler
- Written by: Frank Butler; Don Hartman
- Produced by: Paul Jones
- Starring: Bing Crosby; Bob Hope; Dorothy Lamour
- Cinematography: William C. Mellor
- Edited by: Irene Morra
- Music by: Victor Young; Songs: Johnny Burke (lyrics); Jimmy Van Heusen (music)
- Distributed by: Paramount Pictures
- Release date: November 10, 1942 (US)
- Running time: 82 minutes
- Country: United States
- Language: English
- Box office: $3.8 million (U.S. and Canada rentals)

Road to Morocco is a 1942 American comedy film starring Bing Crosby, Bob Hope and Dorothy Lamour, and featuring Anthony Quinn and Dona Drake. Written by Frank Butler and Don Hartman and directed by David Butler, it's the third of the "Road to ..." films. It was preceded by Road to Zanzibar (1941) and followed by Road to Utopia (1946). The story is about two fast-talking guys cast away on a desert shore and sold into slavery to a princess. In 1996, Road to Morocco was selected for preservation in the United States National Film Registry by the Library of Congress as being "culturally, historically, or aesthetically significant".

== Plot ==
A freighter explodes off the coast of North Africa under mysterious circumstances. All hands are accounted for save for stowaways Jeff Peters and Orville 'Turkey' Jackson, the latter's smoking habit causing the explosion. Upon reaching land, Orville reminds Jeff of his promise to Aunt Lucy to take care of him, but Jeff says she died before he could agree to it. Conveniently, a camel appears, and they hitch a ride.

As Jeff and Orville make their way into the city, they are nearly run over by Arabs led by Sheik Mullay Kasim, who has come to propose to Princess Shalmar. Orville is approached by men carrying a mysterious woman in a veiled palanquin, and her hand takes his before they leave. While at a restaurant, Jeff and Orville plan to skip out on the bill, but a man takes Jeff aside and gives him some money. Jeff has sold Orville, and although he is initially angry, he eventually calms down after Jeff promises to buy him back. Two men then throw a hood over Orville and carry him off.

Jeff has a vision of Aunt Lucy, who shames him for selling Orville. He attempts to buy Orville back but discovers that he has been sold once again. Aunt Lucy then advises Jeff to find Orville and suggests that he sing his favorite song. Jeff walks and sings until a note and Orville's locket are thrown from the palace, warning him of danger. Jeff climbs over the palace wall and hears a woman singing. He sneaks in and finds Orville with Princess Shalmar and other beautiful girls.

Jeff storms into the palace but is caught by guards. Orville pretends not to know him, resulting in the princess dismissing everyone except Jeff. Orville then confesses to their engagement, but the princess reveals that she bought him and that her wise man advised her to marry him. The princess invites Jeff to stay, and Orville is waited on by girls, including Mihirmah, who confesses her love for him. Jeff confronts Orville, who then has him thrown out.

Later, Jeff sings and attracts the princess, and they go for a walk. Mihirmah tries to convince Orville to leave with her. Jeff tells the princess that he should be the one marrying her, but Orville threatens him with a sword. The following day, Kasim threatens to kill Orville, but the princess takes him to the wise man, who reveals a prophecy: the first husband will die a violent death within a week of marriage, and the second will have a long and happy life. The princess declares that Orville is the first husband, and Kasim finally understands.

Orville learns of the prophecy and runs off with Mihirmah, convincing Jeff that the princess actually loves him. That night, Aunt Lucy's spirit rebukes Orville. Princess Shalmar refuses to marry Jeff and sends Orville away to prepare for the wedding. Later, the wise man tells the princess and Jeff that he misread the stars and that the prophecy is incorrect. Jeff now understands why Orville wanted to avoid the marriage, and tells him that the princess has changed her mind. Meanwhile, Kasim learns of the news and rallies his men.

Princess Shalmar and Jeff decide to get married in the United States along with Orville and Mihirmah. However, Kasim intervenes and abducts the princess while giving Mihirmah to one of his men. Jeff and Orville attempt to use their 'patty-cake' routine on Kasim, but it fails, and they end up getting captured along with the girls.

Kasim leaves Jeff and Orville stranded in the desert and takes the women with him. While wandering in the desert, they discover an oasis near Kasim's camp. They try to sneak in but are caught. They then witness a clash between two sheiks and take advantage of the chaos to escape with the girls. The four board a boat back home. However, things take a dangerous turn when Orville causes an explosion while smoking in the powder room. Fortunately, they all survive by clinging onto a pile of wreckage near New York Harbor.

== Cast ==
- Bing Crosby as Jeff Peters
- Bob Hope as Orville "Turkey" Jackson
- Dorothy Lamour as Princess Shalmar
- Anthony Quinn as Mullay Kasim
- Dona Drake as Mihirmah
- Vladimir Sokoloff as Hyder Khan
- Mikhail Rasumny as Ahmed Fey
- George Givot as Neb Jolla
- Leon Belasco as Yusef
- Monte Blue as Second aide to Mullay Kassim
- George Lloyd as First guard
- Dan Seymour as Arabian buyer
- Stanley Price as Idiot
- Louise LaPlanche as handmaiden
- Yvonne De Carlo as handmaiden
- Brandon Hurst as English announcer
- Nestor Paiva as Arab sausage vendor
- Devi Dja as Dancer (uncredited)
- Cy Kendall as Fruit stall proprietor (uncredited)
- Kent Rogers as Male Camel (voice, uncredited)

== Reception ==
The film was placed at No. 4 in the list of top-grossing movies for 1942 in the USA.

Bosley Crowther of The New York Times liked it: "Let us be thankful that Paramount is still blessed with Bing Crosby and Bob Hope, and that it has set its cameras to tailing these two irrepressible wags on another fantastic excursion, Road to Morocco, which came to the Paramount yesterday. For the screen, under present circumstances, can hold no more diverting lure than the prospect of Hope and Crosby ambling, as they have done before, through an utterly slaphappy picture, picking up Dorothy Lamour along the way and tossing acid wisecracks at each other without a thought for reason or sense...The short of it is that Road to Morocco is a daffy, laugh-drafting film. And you’ll certainly agree with the camel which, at one point, offers the gratuitous remark, 'This is the screwiest picture I was ever in'."

Variety commented: "Crosby, Hope and Lamour have done it again. Their click in Road to Singapore and Road to Zanzibar is eclipsed by Road to Morocco... Crosby, of course, is still more or less straighting for Hope’s incessantly steaming gags. The two have never teamed better, nor have they, seemingly, romped with such abandon."

== Songs ==
- "(We're Off on the) Road to Morocco", sung by Bing Crosby and Bob Hope
- "Ain't Got a Dime to My Name", sung by Bing Crosby
- "Constantly", sung by Dorothy Lamour
- "Moonlight Becomes You", sung by Bing Crosby, and later by Lamour, Hope, and Crosby

All lyrics to all songs are by Johnny Burke to music by Jimmy Van Heusen.

Bing Crosby recorded several of the songs for Decca Records. "Moonlight Becomes You" topped the Billboard charts for two weeks during a 17-week stay in the lists. "Constantly" and "(We're Off on the) Road to Morocco" also charted briefly. Crosby's songs were also included in the Bing's Hollywood series.

== Awards and honors ==
The picture received Oscar nominations for Best Sound Recording (Loren L. Ryder) and Best Writing, Original Screenplay. In 1996, Road to Morocco was selected for preservation in the United States National Film Registry by the Library of Congress as being "culturally, historically, or aesthetically significant".

The film is recognized by American Film Institute in these lists:

- 1998: AFI's 100 Years...100 Movies – Nominated
- 2000: AFI's 100 Years...100 Laughs – #78
- 2004: AFI's 100 Years...100 Songs:
  - "(We're Off on the) Road to Morocco" – #95
  - "Moonlight Becomes You" – Nominated
- 2007: AFI's 100 Years...100 Movies (10th Anniversary Edition) – Nominated

== Legacy ==
In an NPR interview, Middle East expert Dr. Jack Shaheen of Southern Illinois University cites Road to Morocco as "one of the most stereotypical films ever to come out of Hollywood." The films themselves were spoofing the popular adventure movies of the time, however.

The 2000 Family Guy episode "Road to Rhode Island" pays homage to Road to Morocco, with characters Brian and Stewie performing a parody of the film's title song, "(We're Off on the) Road to Morocco." That episode has also received numerous "Road To" sequels.

== History ==
Road to Morocco featured the first affectionate interracial kiss (between Bob Hope and Dona Drake) in film. Previously in 1934, the movie Java Head had a quick kiss between married characters Anna Mae Wong and Gerrit Ammidon.
