= Dan Povenmire =

American animator, writer and voice actor (born 1963)

- Povenmire in 2020
- Born: September 18, 1963 (age 63); Santa Ana, California, United States
- Education: University of South Alabama; University of Southern California
- Occupations: Animator; voice actor; screenwriter; director; producer; songwriter
- Years active: 1987–present
- Employer(s): Disney Television Animation; Nickelodeon Animation Studio; 20th Television Animation
- Known for: Phineas and Ferb; Milo Murphy's Law; Hamster & Gretel
- Spouse: Clarissa McPeck Rincón (m. 2000; sep. 2022)
- Children: 2

TikTok information
- Page: Dan Povenmire
- Followers: 6.9 million

YouTube information
- Channel: Dan Povenmire
- Years active: 2007–present
- Genre: Vlog
- Subscribers: 1.76 million
- Views: 848.3 million
- Last updated: July 30th, 2026

Dan Povenmire (/ˈpɒvənmaɪər/ POV-ən-mire; born September 18, 1963) is an American animator, voice actor, writer, director, songwriter and producer. With Jeff "Swampy" Marsh, Povenmire co-created the Disney animated series Phineas and Ferb, where he voices Dr. Heinz Doofenshmirtz. He also created Milo Murphy's Law and Hamster & Gretel.

Povenmire has worked on several animated television series including Hey Arnold!, The Simpsons, Rocko's Modern Life, and SpongeBob SquarePants. He was a director on the Fox animated sitcom Family Guy, where he was nominated for an Annie Award in 2005. He left the series to co-create Phineas and Ferb, for which he has received several award nominations. Following the initial conclusion of Phineas and Ferb, he and Marsh created and produced a second show for Disney titled Milo Murphy's Law, which premiered in 2016. In 2020, the duo made a second Phineas and Ferb film, Candace Against the Universe. The same year, he announced a new series for Disney titled Hamster & Gretel, which premiered in 2022.

== Early life and education ==
Povenmire was born on September 18, 1963, in Santa Ana, California, and grew up in Mobile, Alabama. He had an interest in cartoons as a little kid. A child prodigy, he began drawing at age two; by the time he was ten, his work was displayed in local art shows. His first efforts in animation included a series of flip books that he produced in his school text books. As a child, Povenmire considered animator Chuck Jones and Tex Avery his heroes; in a 2009 interview, he stated that "every drawing he did was beautiful to look at and had so much life in it". The works of Japanese animator Hayao Miyazaki were also an early influence on Povenmire's style. UPA's style influences his geometric designs.

Povenmire received his secondary education at Shaw High School in Mobile, which is now a middle school called Clark-Shaw Magnet School of Math, Science, and Technology. Initially, he attended the University of South Alabama, where he created his first popular comic strip, Life Is a Fish, devoted to the life of Herman the goldfish and the college students he lives with. Povenmire also supported himself as a waiter and performer at a dinner theater. In 1985, he transferred to the University of Southern California (USC), planning to pursue a career in film.

Soon after arriving at USC, he pitched Life Is a Fish to Mark Ordesky, the editor-in-chief of the Daily Trojan, the university newspaper. Ordesky first "basically brushed [him] off", but, after viewing Povenmire's portfolio, accepted the strip. Fish ran daily in the paper. Though the rapid pace left Povenmire afraid he was "running out of ideas", he never missed a deadline and made $14,000 a year through Fish merchandise, which included T-shirts, books, and calendars sold at the campus craft fair. The discipline of regular production also helped teach Povenmire to "represent something in the least amount of lines".

== Career ==
=== 1987–1991: Early works ===
Povenmire left USC without finishing the degree requirements, and used the money from Fish merchandise to fund a short-lived career as a street artist. His first professional animation commission came on the Tommy Chong project Far Out Man, for which Povenmire produced two minutes of animation. By age 24, Povenmire was freelancing on several animated television series, including Teenage Mutant Ninja Turtles and X-Men: The Animated Series. In 1989, he appeared in a small role as a band member in Adam Sandler's first film, Going Overboard.

=== 1992–1998: The Simpsons, Rocko's Modern Life, and his animation career ===
In the 1990s, Povenmire secured a job as a character layout animator on the hit animated series The Simpsons. His desk placed him opposite Jeffrey Marsh, another up-and-coming animator. They shared similar tastes in humor and music, and later became colleagues on other projects.

Povenmire's experience, from both previous industry work and from his own projects, earned him respect at The Simpsons. He worked on layout animation and collaborated on storyboard production for the series, recalling later that staff were handed pages of production notes and instructed to "Do the [creative consultant] Brad Bird notes and any others that make sense." He maintained a side interest in film, writing scripts and the screenplay for a low-budget horror movie, Psycho Cop 2. The movie's producers offered Povenmire the opportunity to direct the film, but its terms required that he quit The Simpsons. Povenmire chose to stay with The Simpsons, which he enjoyed and considered a better fit with his future ambitions. Rif Coogan ended up directing the picture instead.

"I could have just stayed at The Simpsons ad infinitum. I have friends there who were there when I was and are still working on the show. But animation is such that at the end of production they lay off all the artists and then at the end of post-production they bring all the artists back. I was looking at a two- or three-month downtime."

— Povenmire, on leaving The Simpsons for Rocko's Modern Life

Work on The Simpsons involved an irregular schedule. The producers laid off the animation staff for two-to-three-month periods, and rehired the staff later in the production cycle. During one of these layoffs, Povenmire found a temporary job on the series Rocko's Modern Life, Nickelodeon's first in-house cartoon production. The show's creator, television newcomer Joe Murray, hired Povenmire solely on the strength of his Life is a Fish comic strips, which proved he could both write and draw.

Though Povenmire started on Rocko simply to occupy his downtime from The Simpsons, he found the greater creative freedom he enjoyed on his temporary job compelling, and quit The Simpsons to work on Rocko full-time. There, he reunited with Jeff Marsh, this time as a writing partner; Marsh claimed the crew hoped Povenmire's neatness would offset his own sloppy storyboarding. The pair developed a distinctive style characterized by characteristic musical numbers and chase scenes. Povenmire and Marsh won an Environmental Achievement Award for a 1996 Rocko episode they had written. In addition in their time on Rocko, the duo would work for a few Ren & Stimpy episodes, such as "Stupid Sidekick Union" and "Big Flakes", as additional storyboard artist, working alongside future Madagascar creator Tom McGrath, who had done main storyboards for the episode. Once production for Rocko had ended, Povenmire would work as storyboard for Hey Arnold! and writer for The Angry Beavers, as well as both storyboard and writer for CatDog for a brief while.

=== 1999–2006: Family Guy and SpongeBob SquarePants ===
Povenmire would eventually rejoin the Fox Network to briefly work on King of the Hill (of which his friend Jeff Marsh had also worked on). During that same time, he would be promoted as storyboard artist, designer, and director for Family Guy, starting with the season two episode "Road to Rhode Island". Creator Seth MacFarlane granted Povenmire substantial creative freedom. Povenmire recalled that MacFarlane would tell him "We've got two minutes to fill. Give me some visual gags. Do whatever you want. I trust you." Povenmire praised MacFarlane's management style for letting him "have [...] fun."

Povenmire brought realism and material from his own experiences to the visual direction of Family Guy. For "One If by Clam, Two If by Sea" (August 1, 2001), several characters demonstrate Fosse-like moves in prison. To correctly depict the moves, Povenmire asked color artist Cynthia MacIntosh, who had been a professional dancer, to strike poses so he could properly illustrate the sequence. In the episode "To Love and Die in Dixie" (November 15, 2001), Povenmire drew on his childhood in the Deep South to create and sequence a background scene in which the redneck character nonchalantly kicks a corpse into the nearby river.

"Brian Wallows and Peter's Swallows" (January 17, 2002), a Family Guy episode which Povenmire directed, won the Emmy Award for Best Song. Creator MacFarlane, the recipient of the award, noted that Povenmire deserved to have received the award for the contribution the visuals made to the episode's win. Povenmire responded in jest, "That's a nice sentiment and all, but did he offer to give me his? No! And it's not like he doesn't already have two of his own just sitting in his house!" Povenmire was nominated for an Annie Award for Directing in an Animated Television Production for the episode "PTV" (November 6, 2005) but lost out to a fellow Family Guy director, Peter Shin, who had directed the episode "North by North Quahog". Povenmire and several others were also nominated for their work on "PTV" in the Outstanding Animated Program (for Programming Less Than One Hour) category at the Primetime Emmy Awards. Povenmire also received the same nomination for "Road to Rhode Island."

During Family Guy's brief cancellation, Povenmire was offered a job as storyboard director of the series SpongeBob SquarePants. He would also work on both shows Futurama and American Dad!, as well as returning to The Simpsons, during that timeframe. He also became a writer for the show, writing the season 2 episodes "Graveyard Shift", "The Fry Cook Games" and "Sandy, SpongeBob and the Worm", all of which premiered on Nickelodeon between 2001 and 2002. He also wrote "The Campfire Song Song" for the Season 3 episode "The Camping Episode", for which he was also a storyboard director on alongside Jay Lender (April 3, 2004).

=== 2007–present: Disney and Phineas and Ferb ===
"It wasn't like we pitched it to every network more than once. We pitched it to four different places. We'd get real close, they'd say no, so we'd put it back on the shelf for a couple of years, then—'I've got a pitch over at Cartoon Network—I'll dust it back off and pitch it to them; if they say no, I'll dust it off and pitch it to Nickelodeon.'"

— Povenmire, on pitching Phineas and Ferb

In 1993, Povenmire and Marsh conceived the series Phineas and Ferb, based on their similar childhood experiences spending summers outdoors. Povenmire spent approximately 12 years pitching Phineas and Ferb to several networks including Cartoon Network, Fox Kids and Nickelodeon. Though most rejected it as unfeasible for the complexity of its plots, Povenmire continued to regularly pitch the series. The Walt Disney Company initially rejected his pitch, but requested to keep the proposal packet. Disney eventually picked the series up for a 26-episode season after requesting that Povenmire first produce an 11-minute pilot. He called Marsh, who was living in England, to ask him if he would like to work on the pilot; Marsh accepted immediately and moved back to the United States.

Instead of a conventional script, the pair pitched the pilot by recording reels of its storyboard, which Povenmire then mixed and dubbed to produce action and vocals. Povenmire subsequently left Family Guy to create the series. Influenced by the style of animator Tex Avery, Povenmire employed geometric shapes to build both the characters and the background. Povenmire's first sketch of Phineas Flynn was drawn while eating dinner with his family in a restaurant in South Pasadena, California. Doodled on the butcher paper covering the table, he saved it and used it as a stylistic blueprint for the show.

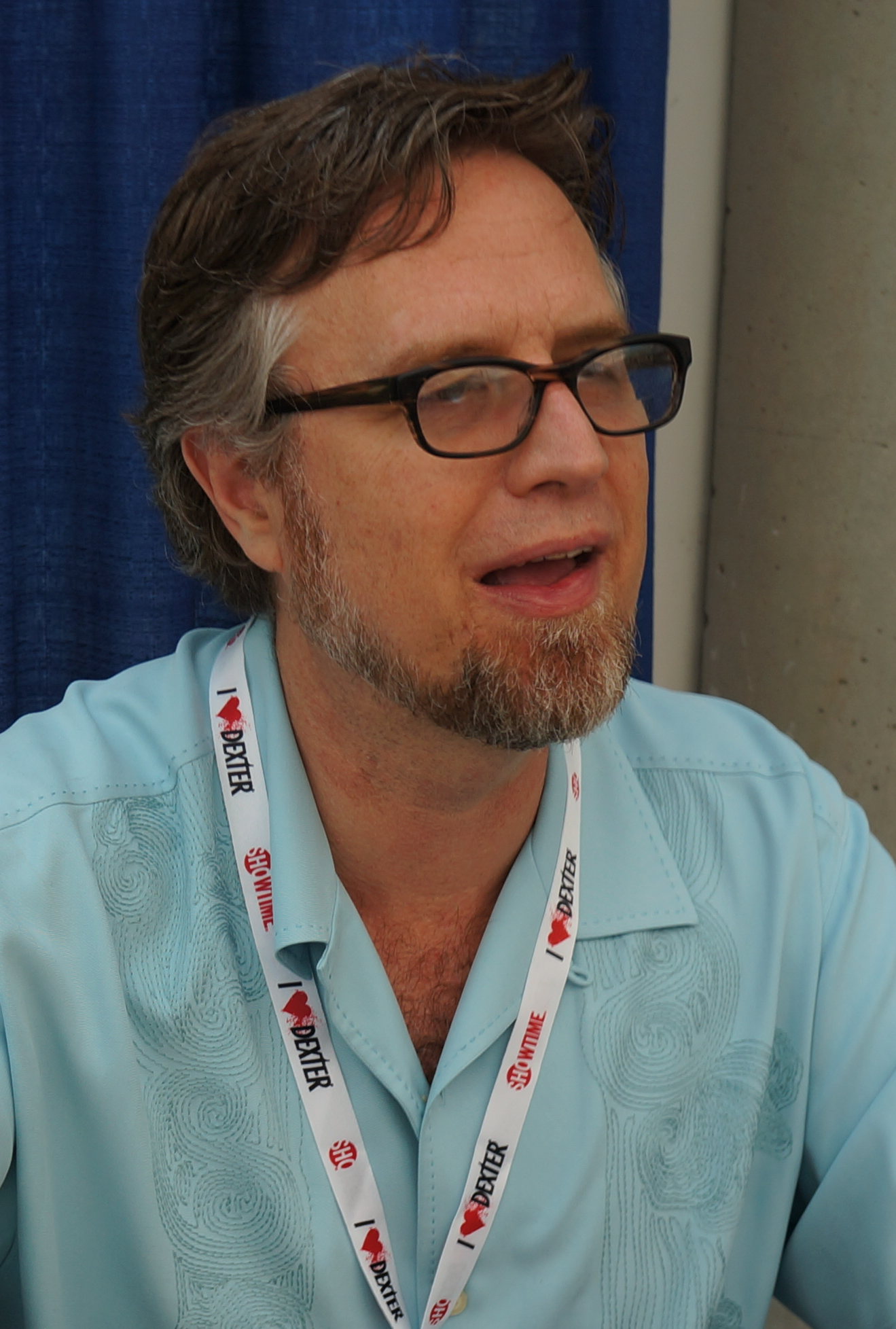
Povenmire at the 2013 San Diego Comic-Con

Povenmire and Marsh wanted to incorporate the kind of humor they had developed in their work on Rocko's Modern Life. They include action sequences and, with Disney's encouragement, featured musical numbers in every episode subsequent to "Flop Starz". The pair have earned several Emmy nominations for Phineas and Ferb. In 2010, Povenmire was nominated alongside several other Phineas and Ferb crew members for the Daytime Emmy Award for both "Outstanding Writing in Animation" and "Outstanding Original Song – Children's and Animation" for their work on the show, winning for "Outstanding Writing in Animation". In 2021, Povenmire won an Emmy Award for "Outstanding Writing Team for a Daytime Animated Program" for Candace Against the Universe.

=== Musical endeavors ===
During his college years, Povenmire had performed with a band that played at clubs and bars across Los Angeles, California. His current band, Keep Left, releases albums through Arizona University Recordings. Their second CD, Letters from Fielding, became available for download on aurec.com during 2004. They have an official website maintained and updated by artist Larry Stone. A 2004 email exchange about the website between Stone and Povenmire resulted in a "clever and twisted" series of comic strips drawn by the two, eventually moved to the website Badmouth.

== Personal life ==
Povenmire married Clarissa McPeck Rincón in 2000. In 2023, he announced they were separated and in the process of getting divorced. His daughter, Meli, voices the titular character Gretel in Hamster & Gretel, and also serves as the namesake of Melissa Chase on Milo Murphy's Law. His other daughter, Isabella, now going by Alex, serves as the namesake of the Phineas and Ferb character Isabella Garcia-Shapiro.

Povenmire has attention deficit hyperactivity disorder.

== Filmography ==
=== Films ===
Year	Film	Role	Notes
1988	Never on Tuesday	—N/a	Storyboard artist
1989	Going Overboard	Yellow Teeth guitarist	Also animator
1990	Far Out Man	—N/a	Animator
1991	The Dark Backward	—N/a	Storyboard artist
1993	Psycho Cop 2	—N/a	Writer
2003	Museum Scream	—N/a	Writer and director
2011	Phineas and Ferb the Movie: Across the 2nd Dimension	Dr. Heinz Doofenshmirtz (1st and 2nd Dimension)	Television film; also writer, director and producer
2020	Scoob!	—N/a	Executive producer
2020	Phineas and Ferb the Movie: Candace Against the Universe	Dr. Heinz Doofenshmirtz	Feature film; also supervising director, executive producer and writer
2020	Phineas and Ferb the Movie: Candace Against the Universe	Himself	Feature film; also supervising director, executive producer and writer

=== Animation ===
Year	Series	Role	Notes
1991	James Bond Jr.	—N/a	Storyboard conforming and storyboard artist
1991	Teenage Mutant Ninja Turtles	—N/a	Storyboard conforming
1992–1993	X-Men: The Animated Series	—N/a	Storyboard conforming and character layout artist
1992–1996, 2002–2006	The Simpsons	—N/a	Storyboard artist and character layout artist
1993	Adventures of Sonic the Hedgehog	—N/a	Storyboard conforming
1993–1996	Rocko's Modern Life	—N/a	Storyboard director and storyboard artist
1994	The Critic	—N/a	Character layout artist
1995	Earthworm Jim	—N/a	Storyboard artist
1995	The Ren & Stimpy Show	—N/a	Additional storyboard artist
1996	The Spooktacular New Adventures of Casper	—N/a	Layout artist
1996	Duckman	—N/a	Character and layout designer
1996–1999	Hey Arnold!	—N/a	Storyboard artist and director
1997–1999	The Angry Beavers	—N/a	Additional storyboard artist and writer
1998–1999, 2001	CatDog	—N/a	Storyboard director and writer
1999–2000	Dilbert	—N/a	Layout artist
2000	King of the Hill	—N/a	Additional storyboard artist
2000–2002, 2005–2007	Family Guy	—N/a	Storyboard artist and director
2001–2004	SpongeBob SquarePants	—N/a	Writer, storyboard artist and director, and assistant storyboard artist
2002–2003	The Fairly OddParents	—N/a	Senior storyboard artist
2002–2003	Futurama	—N/a	Additional storyboard artist
2005	Camp Lazlo	—N/a	Senior storyboard artist
2006	American Dad!	—N/a	Additional storyboard artist
2007–2015, 2025–present	Phineas and Ferb	Dr. Heinz Doofenshmirtz / various characters	Voice; co-creator, executive producer, story, writer, director, and storyboard artist
2010–2011	Take Two with Phineas and Ferb	Dr. Heinz Doofenshmirtz	Voice; co-creator, executive producer and storyboard artist
2013	Shark Tank	Dr. Heinz Doofenshmirtz	Voice; guest, episode 426
2016–2019	Milo Murphy's Law	Vinnie Dakota / Dr. Heinz Doofenshmirtz / various characters	Voice; co-creator, executive producer, story, writer, director, and storyboard artist
2022–present	Chibiverse	Dr. Heinz Doofenshmirtz / Alien Pilot	Voice
2022–2025	Hamster & Gretel	Alien Pilot / Dr. Heinz Doofenshmirtz / various characters	Voice; creator, executive producer and director
2024	Big City Greens	Old Man	Voice; episode: "Guiding Gregly" / songwriter: "I Found My People"
2025	Cartoonified with Phineas and Ferb	Dr. Heinz Doofenshmirtz	Voice; episode: "Avantika"

=== Video games ===
Year	Film	Role	Notes
2011	Phineas and Ferb: Across the 2nd Dimension	Dr. Heinz Doofenshmirtz (1st and 2nd Dimension)	Voice
2013	Phineas and Ferb: Quest for Cool Stuff	Dr. Heinz Doofenshmirtz	Voice

=== Web series ===
Year	Series	Role	Notes
2013–2014	Doofenshmirtz's Daily Dirt	Dr. Heinz Doofenshmirtz	Voice
2019	Phineas & Ferb – Busted (Shot-For-Shot Remake) Ft. Dan Povenmire	Dr. Heinz Doofenshmirtz	Live-action
2019	Broken Karaoke	Dr. Heinz Doofenshmirtz	Voice; "Doof's Christmas Song FAIL!" and "Deck The Halls".
2020	Random Rings	Dr. Heinz Doofenshmirtz	Voice
2022	How Not To Draw	Dr. Heinz Doofenshmirtz	Voice; "How Not To Draw: Dr Heinz Doofensmirtz".

== Bibliography ==
- Callaghan, Steve (2005). Family Guy: The Official Episode Guide, Seasons 1–3. HarperCollins. ISBN 0-06-083305-X.
- Greenspon, Jaq (2003). Careers For Film Buffs & Other Hollywood Types. McGraw-Hill. ISBN 978-0-07-140574-4.
- Neuwirth, Allan (2003). Makin' Toons: Inside the Most Popular Animated TV Shows and Movies. Allworth Communications, Inc. ISBN 1-58115-269-8.
