= Danny Smith (writer) =

American screenwriter (born 1959 or 1960)

- Occupations: Writer, executive producer, voice actor
- Years active: 1990–present

Daniel G. "Danny" Smith (born 1959 or 1960) is an American writer, executive producer and voice actor on the American animated television series Family Guy. He has been with the show since its inception and, throughout the years, has contributed to many episodes, such as "Holy Crap", "The Father, the Son, and the Holy Fonz", "Chitty Chitty Death Bang" and the Christmas themed episodes, "Road to the North Pole" and "A Very Special Family Guy Freakin' Christmas". Smith also voices the Evil Monkey, Ernie the Giant Chicken, Buzz Killington and Al Harrington. Smith has also written many songs for Family Guy, including "Prom Night Dumpster Baby", "Drunken Irish Dad" (which was nominated for an Emmy Award), and "Christmastime Is Killing Us", which was also nominated for an Emmy Award as well as a Grammy Award. He is the only Family Guy writer who hails from the state of Rhode Island, where the show is set (although creator Seth MacFarlane attended the Rhode Island School of Design).

Smith was born in 1959 or 1960 to Anne. His brothers are Harry and Steve, and his sisters are Betty, Cynthia DiNobile, and Sandra DeAngelis. Raised in Smithfield, Smith graduated from Smithfield High School in 1977 and from Rhode Island College in 1981.

An experienced sitcom writer, he has written for several television shows, such as Nurses, 3rd Rock from the Sun, Yes, Dear and Head of the Class.

His acting credits include roles in feature films, "Conspiracy Theory", "Ted", and "The Three Stooges" and television series, "Zoey 101" and "The Orville".

In his early years in Hollywood, Smith performed stand-up and also studied and performed improv at The Groundlings.

Smith wrote and illustrated a regular feature in the Rhode Island College student newspaper, The Anchor, called Joe Flynn and His Dog Spot, about a man and his best friend, a talking dog.

Smith was a weekly on-air contributor on the Providence edition of PM Magazine in the early 1980s. Smith is the brother of Steve Smith of Steve Smith and the Nakeds.

== Episodes written ==
List of Family Guy episodes Smith has written.

- #3: "Chitty Chitty Death Bang" (1999)
- #9: "Holy Crap" (1999)
- #44: "A Very Special Family Guy Freakin' Christmas" (2001)
- #61: "Peter's Got Woods" (2005)
- #68: "The Father, the Son, and the Holy Fonz" (2005)
- #90: "Peter's Two Dads" (2007)
- #108: "Play It Again, Brian" (2008)
- #121: "Not All Dogs Go to Heaven" (2009)
- #147: "Partial Terms of Endearment" (2010) BBC Three
- #154: "Road to the North Pole" (2010) (with Chris Sheridan)
- #177: "Livin' on a Prayer" (2012)
- #194: "Lois Comes Out of Her Shell" (2012)
- #229: "Meg Stinks!" (2014)
- #251: "Papa Has a Rollin' Son" (2015)
- #269: "Road to India" (2016)
- #286: "Peter's Lost Youth" (2017)
- #298: "Don't Be a Dickens at Christmas" (2017)
- #349: "Movin' In (Principal Shepherd's Song)" (2020)
