= 2013 in animation =

2013 in animation is an overview of notable events, including notable awards, list of films released, television show debuts and endings, and notable deaths.

== Events ==
=== January ===
- January 7: Cartoon Network announced the following:
  - A fifth season renewal of Regular Show.
  - A third season renewal of The Amazing World of Gumball.
  - Additional episodes for The High Fructose Adventures of Annoying Orange.
- January 11: The first episode of Sofia the First airs.
- January 28: Cartoon Network renews Adventure Time for sixth season.

=== February ===
- February 4: Japanese animation studio Science Saru is founded by director Masaaki Yuasa and producer Eunyoung Choi.
- February 10: Family Guy's 200th episode "Valentine's Day in Quahog" premieres on Fox. It was seen by just over 4.7 million viewers that night.
- February 15: The Weinstein Company's animated film Escape from Planet Earth, directed by Cal Brunker and produced by Rainmaker Entertainment, is released in the U.S., to mostly negative reviews from critics.
- February 24: The 85th Academy Awards premiere, hosted by Seth MacFarlane.
  - Brave by Mark Andrews and Brenda Chapman wins the Academy Award for Best Animated Feature.
  - Paperman by John Kahrs wins the Academy Award for Best Animated Short Film.
- February 26: The Scooby-Doo direct-to-video film Scooby-Doo! Mask of the Blue Falcon releases on DVD, Blu-ray, and UltraViolet. The movie is a crossover with Dynomutt, Dog Wonder.

=== March ===
- March 22: The Croods, a film directed by Chris Sanders and Kirk DeMicco and produced by DreamWorks Animation, is released by 20th Century Fox.
- March 30: The second & final season of The Problem Solverz was released exclusively on Netflix.

=== April ===
- April 7: The first episode of Attack on Titan is broadcast.
- April 15: The first episode of Doki airs.
- April 23:
  - The 6th & final season of Johnny Test begins on Cartoon Network with the premiere of the episode "Johnny on the Clock".
  - The first episode of Teen Titans Go! aired on Cartoon Network.

=== May ===
- May 7: 40th Annie Awards.
- May 12:
  - Bob's Burgers concludes its third season on Fox with the episode "The Unnatural". The season's finale was seen by over 3.3 million viewers that night.
  - American Dad! concludes its ninth season on Fox with the episode "Da Flippity Flop", guest starring sport athletes Shaun White & Jonny Moseley. The season's finale was seen by just over 4 million viewers that night.
- May 19:
  - The Cleveland Show's final episodes, "Crazy Train" and "Wheel! Of! Family!", premiere on Fox. The series was cancelled due to the show's declining ratings over its run. Cleveland later returned to Family Guy in Season 12's "He's Bla-ack!", along with his new family.
    - Episode viewership: "Crazy Train" (2.14 million), "Wheel! Of! Family!" (2.43 million)
  - The Simpsons concludes its 24th season on Fox with the following episodes:
    - "The Saga of Carl", guest starring Icelandic band Sigur Rós. (viewership: 4.01m)
    - "Dangers on a Train", guest starring Seth MacFarlane & Lisa Lampanelli. (viewership: 4.52m)
  - Family Guy concludes its 11th season on Fox with the following episodes:
    - "Roads to Vegas" (viewership: 5.28m)
    - "No Country Club for Old Men" (viewership: 5.16m)
- May 24: Blue Sky Studios releases Epic, directed by Chris Wedge.

=== June ===
- June 1: The Hub is renamed to Hub Network.
- June 16: My Little Pony: Equestria Girls is released.
- June 21: Pixar's Monsters University is released.

=== July ===
- July 3: Illumination's Despicable Me 2 was released.
- July 17: Turbo, a sports comedy film directed by David Soren and produced by DreamWorks Animation, was released by 20th Century Fox.
- July 18: RWBY premieres on Rooster Teeth.
- July 20: The Wind Rises, directed by Hayao Miyazaki and produced by Studio Ghibli, is released in Japan.
- July 21: The Animation Domination High-Def block launches in the Fox Broadcasting Company.

=== August ===
- August 2: The Gravity Falls Season one finale, "Gideon Rises" premiered on Disney Channel, it was seen by over 3 million viewers.
- August 8: Teenage Mutant Ninja Turtles concludes its first season on Nickelodeon with the two-part special "Showdown". The season's finale was seen by 3.14 million viewers that night.
- August 9: Klay Hall's Planes, produced by Disneytoon Studios as a spin-off of Pixar's Cars franchise, is released theatrically, to negative reviews from critics.
- August 12:
  - The first episode of Paw Patrol is broadcast.
  - Regular Show concluded its fourth season on Cartoon Network.
- August 16: The Phineas and Ferb and Marvel hour-long crossover event, "Phineas and Ferb: Mission Marvel" premiered on Disney Channel, just like the Gravity Falls season finale, it was seen by over 3 million viewers. A sneak peek of the other Disney Channel animated series, Wander Over Yonder airs right after.
- August 20: The Scooby-Doo direct-to-video film Scooby-Doo! Stage Fright releases on DVD, Blu-ray, & UltraViolet.

=== September ===
- September 2:
  - The first two episodes from Season 5 of Regular Show premiere on Cartoon Network.
  - Uncle Grandpa airs its first two episodes on Cartoon Network.
- September 4: Futurama aired its final episode on Comedy Central after four seasons and 52 episodes. The show would be revived again in 2022, with Hulu ordering 20 episodes for 2023.
- September 13: Wander Over Yonder made its official premiere on Disney Channel, it was seen by over 3 million viewers.
  - Season 2 of The Legend of Korra begins on Nickelodeon with the premiere of the episodes "Rebel Spirit" and "The Southern Lights". The season's premiere was seen by 2.6 million viewers that night.
- September 25: Season 17 of South Park begins on Comedy Central with the premiere of the episode "Let Go, Let Gov". It was seen by just nearly 2.9 million viewers that night.
- September 27: Cloudy with a Chance of Meatballs 2, directed by Cody Cameron and Kris Pearn and produced by Sony Pictures Animation, is released, to generally positive responses from both critics and audiences.
- September 29:
  - Season 25 of The Simpsons begins on Fox with the premiere of the episode "Homerland", guest starring Kevin Michael Richardson and Kristen Wiig. The season's premiere was seen by over 6.3 million viewers that night.
  - Season 4 of Bob's Burgers begins on Fox with the premiere of the episode "A River Runs Through Bob". The season's premiere was seen by over 4.4 million viewers that night.
  - Season 12 of Family Guy begins on Fox with the premiere of the episode "Finders Keepers", guest starring Yvette Nicole Brown & Lea Thompson. The season's premiere was seen by 5.2 million viewers that night.
  - Season 10 of American Dad! begins on Fox with the premiere of the episode "Steve & Snot's Test-Tubular Adventure". The season's premiere was seen by over 4.3 million viewers that night.

=== October ===
- October 7: PBS Kids rebrands with new promos and bumpers, shutting down PBS Kids Preschool Block and PBS Kids Go!. The same day, Peg + Cat premieres to positive reviews.
- October 12: Season 2 of Teenage Mutant Ninja Turtles begins on Nickelodeon with the premiere of the episode "The Mutation Situation". The season's premiere was seen by 2.68 million viewers that night.

=== November ===
- November 1: Free Birds, directed by Jimmy Hayward and produced by Reel FX Animation Studios as its first original animated feature film, is released by Relativity Media, to negative reviews from critics.
- November 4: Steven Universe airs its first episodes on Cartoon Network.
- November 11: The SpongeBob SquarePants episode "SpongeBob, You're Fired" premieres on Nickelodeon, originally broadcast in Greece four months earlier. It was condemned for "slamming the benefits of Unemployment".
- November 13: PBS Kids Sprout renamed to Sprout.
- November 22: Walt Disney Pictures releases Frozen, which becomes a global phenomenon, also released is the Mickey Mouse cartoon Get a Horse!.
  - The Legend of Korra concludes its second season on Nickelodeon with the episodes "Darkness Falls" and "The Light in the Dark". The season finale was seen by 2.1 million viewers that night.
- November 23: The Tale of the Princess Kaguya, directed by Isao Takahata (as his final directorial anime film before his death in April 2018) and produced by Studio Ghibli, is released in Japan.
- November 24: The Family Guy episode "Life of Brian" premieres on Fox, in which Brian Griffin dies.

=== December ===
- December 2: Rick and Morty debuts on Adult Swim.
- December 3: The Amazing World of Gumball concludes its second season on Cartoon Network with the premiere of the episode "The Finale".
- December 11: South Park concludes its 17th season on Comedy Central with the episode "The Hobbit". It was seen by over 2.1 million viewers that night.
- December 15: Brian Griffin is revived in the Family Guy episode "Christmas Guy".
- December 18: The Hole is added to the National Film Registry.

== Awards ==
- Academy Award for Best Animated Feature: Brave
- Academy Award for Best Animated Short Film: Paperman
- Animation Kobe Feature Film Award: The Garden of Words
- Annecy International Animated Film Festival Cristal du long métrage: Rio 2096: A Story of Love and Fury
- Annie Award for Best Animated Feature: Frozen
- Asia Pacific Screen Award for Best Animated Feature Film: Koo! Kin-Dza-Dza
- BAFTA Award for Best Animated Film: Frozen
- César Award for Best Animated Film: Loulou, l'incroyable secret
- European Film Award for Best Animated Film: The Congress
- Golden Globe Award for Best Animated Feature Film: Frozen
- Goya Award for Best Animated Film: Underdogs
- Japan Academy Prize for Animation of the Year: The Wind Rises
- Japan Media Arts Festival Animation Grand Prize: Approved for Adoption
- Mainichi Film Awards - Animation Grand Award: The Tale of the Princess Kaguya

== Television series debuts ==
Date	Title	Channel	Year
January 10	Rocket Monkeys	Teletoon	2013–2016
January 11	Sofia the First	Disney Junior	2013–2018
January 16	Legends of Chima	Cartoon Network	2013–2014
February 2	Pokémon: BW: Adventures in Unova	Cartoon Network	2013
February 18	Sarah & Duck	CBeebies	2013–2017
March 17	Angry Birds Toons	Toons.tv	2013–2016
March 23	Monsters vs. Aliens	Nickelodeon	2013–2014
March 25	Max Steel	Disney XD, Teletoon	2013–2015
March 29	Lalaloopsy	Nick Jr.	2013–2015
April 7	Attack on Titan	MBS, NHK G, Crunchyroll, Funimation, Hulu, Toonami	2013–2023
April 15	Henry Hugglemonster	Disney Junior	2013–2015
April 19	Creative Galaxy	Amazon Video	2013–2019
April 23	Teen Titans Go!	Cartoon Network	2013–present
May 25	Sanjay and Craig	Nickelodeon	2013–2016
May 26	Avengers Assemble	Disney XD	2013–2019
June 10	Grojband	Teletoon	2013–2015
June 15	Pac-Man and the Ghostly Adventures	Disney XD	2013–2015
June 28	Mickey Mouse	Disney Channel	2013–2019
July 4	Camp Lakebottom	Teletoon	2013–2017
July 11	Bee and PuppyCat	Cartoon Hangover	2013–2020
July 13	Beware the Batman	Cartoon Network, Adult Swim	2013–2014
July 13	Packages from Planet X	Disney XD, Teletoon	2013–2014
July 13	Bounty Hunters	CMT	2013
July 21	Axe Cop	Fox	2013–2015
July 21	High School USA!	Fox	2013–2015
July 27	Pokémon: BW: Adventures in Unova and Beyond	Cartoon Network	2013
August 1	The Awesomes	Hulu	2013–2015
August 3	Rabbids Invasion	France 3, Nickelodeon	2013–2017
August 3	Oh No! It's an Alien Invasion	YTV	2013–2015
August 11	Hulk and the Agents of S.M.A.S.H.	Disney XD	2013–2015
August 12	PAW Patrol	Nickelodeon, Nick Jr., TVO Kids	2013–present
August 16	Wander Over Yonder	Disney Channel, Disney XD	2013–2016
August 26	Xiaolin Chronicles	Disney XD, Gulli	2013–2015
September 2	Uncle Grandpa	Cartoon Network	2013–2017
September 21	The Day My Butt Went Psycho!	Teletoon, Nine Network	2013–2015
September 29	Julius Jr.	Nick Jr.	2013–2015
October 3	Kill la Kill	MBS, Crunchyroll, Hulu, Daisuki, Toonami	2013–2014
October 7	Peg + Cat	PBS Kids	2013–2018
October 12	Sabrina: Secrets of a Teenage Witch	Hub Network	2013–2014
November 4	Steven Universe	Cartoon Network	2013–2019
November 6	Mother Up!	Hulu, City	2013–2014
November 10	Barry Tales	YouTube	2013–present
November 23	Lucas Bros. Moving Co.	Fox, FXX	2013–2014
November 23	Golan the Insatiable	Fox, FXX	2013–2015
December 2	Rick and Morty	Adult Swim	2013–present
December 24	Turbo FAST	Netflix	2013–2016

== Television series endings ==
Date	Title	Channel	Year	Notes
January 3	Generator Rex	Cartoon Network	2010–2013	Cancelled
January 7	Motorcity	Disney XD	2012–2013	Cancelled
January 26	Stoked	Teletoon	2009–2013	Cancelled
January 26	Pokémon: BW: Rival Destinies	Cartoon Network	2012–2013	Ended
January 28	Tron: Uprising	Disney XD	2012–2013	Ended
February 14	Handy Manny	Disney Junior	2006–2013	Ended
February 15	Planet Sheen	Nicktoons	2010–2013	Ended
March 9	Dan Vs.	The Hub	2011–2013	Ended
March 16	Green Lantern: The Animated Series	Cartoon Network	2011–2013	Ended
March 25	Sid the Science Kid	PBS Kids	2008–2013	Ended
March 30	The Problem Solverz	Netflix	2011–2013	Cancelled
April 5	Scooby-Doo! Mystery Incorporated	Cartoon Network	2010–2013	Ended
May 5	The Avengers: Earth's Mightiest Heroes	Disney XD	2011–2013	Ended
May 19	The Cleveland Show	Fox	2009–2013	Ended
May 22	Almost Naked Animals	YTV	2011–2013	Cancelled
July 12	The Backyardigans	Nick Jr.	2004–2013	Ended
July 20	Pokémon: BW: Adventures in Unova	Cartoon Network	2013	Ended
July 26	Transformers: Prime	Hub Network	2010–2013	Ended
August 17	Scaredy Squirrel	YTV	2011–2013	Ended
August 25	Speed Racer: The Next Generation	Nicktoons	2008–2013	Ended
September 4	Futurama	Comedy Central	1999–2003, 2008–2013	Ended, until revived by Hulu in 2023
September 14	Sidekick	YTV	2010–2013	Ended
September 28	Bounty Hunters	CMT	2013	Cancelled
October 27	Metalocalypse	Adult Swim	2006–2013	Ended
November 2	The Looney Tunes Show	Cartoon Network	2011–2013	Ended
November 16	Pound Puppies	Hub Network	2010–2013	Ended
December 2	Mad	Cartoon Network	2010–2013	Ended
December 7	Pokémon: BW: Adventures in Unova and Beyond	Cartoon Network	2013	Ended
December 28	Kaijudo	Hub Network	2012–2013	Cancelled

== Television season premieres ==
Date	Title	Season	Channel, Streaming
March 23	The Fairly OddParents	9	Nickelodeon
March 30	The Problem Solverz	2	Netflix
April 1	Mad	4	Cartoon Network
April 23	Johnny Test	6	Cartoon Network
June 7	Fish Hooks	3	Disney Channel
September 2	Regular Show	5	Cartoon Network
September 25	South Park	17	Comedy Central
September 29	American Dad!	10	Fox
September 29	Bob's Burgers	4	Fox
September 29	Family Guy	12	Fox
September 29	The Simpsons	25	Fox

== Television season finales ==
Date	Title	Season	Channel
February 18	Robot Chicken	6	Adult Swim
March 4	Mad	3	Cartoon Network
May 12	American Dad!	9	Fox
May 12	Bob's Burgers	3	Fox
May 17	Fish Hooks	2	Disney Channel
May 19	Family Guy	11	Fox
May 19	The Simpsons	24	Fox
August 2	Gravity Falls	1	Disney Channel
August 12	Regular Show	4	Cartoon Network
September 4	Futurama	7 (Note: The show originally ended again with this season until it was revived for Hulu nearly 10 years later.)	Comedy Central
December 3	The Amazing World of Gumball	2	Cartoon Network
December 11	South Park	17	Comedy Central

== Births ==
=== August ===
- August 5: Pyper Braun, American actress (voice of Bitsy, Phoebe and Frankie in SuperKitties).

== Deaths ==
=== January ===
- January 7: Huell Howser, American television personality, actor, producer, writer and singer (voice of Backson in Winnie the Pooh, himself in The Simpsons episode "Oh Brother, Where Bart Thou?"), dies from prostate cancer at age 67.
- January 30: Patty Andrews, American singer (co-sung the Johnny Fedora and Alice Blue Bonnet segment in Make Mine Music, and Little Toot in Melody Time), dies at age 94.

=== February ===
- February 1: Robin Sachs, English actor (voice of Silver Surfer in Fantastic Four, Sergeant Sam Roderick in the SpongeBob SquarePants episode "Mrs. Puff, You're Fired"), dies from a heart attack at age 61.
- February 10: W. Watts Biggers, American writer (co-creator of Underdog), dies at age 85.
- February 16: Harald Siepermann, German comics artist and animator (Alfred J. Kwak), dies at age 50.
- February 17: Richard Briers, British actor (narrator of Roobarb and Noah and Nelly in... SkylArk, voice of Noddy in the 1975 Noddy TV series and Fiver in Watership Down), dies at age 79.
- February 21:
  - Bob Godfrey, British animator (Roobarb, Noah and Nelly in... SkylArk, Henry's Cat, Great), dies at age 91.
  - Armen Mirzaian, Iranian-born American animator, storyboard artist (Cartoon Network Studios, Hasbro Studios, Hulk and the Agents of S.M.A.S.H.) and writer (Adventure Time), dies from a car accident at age 35.

=== March ===
- March 5: Goro Naya, Japanese voice actor (voice of Inspector Zenigata in Lupin III), dies at age 83.
- March 7: Max Ferguson, Canadian radio personality and actor (voice of Hulk in The Marvel Super Heroes), dies at age 89.
- March 13: Malachi Throne, American actor (voice of God in Animaniacs, Mongke in Avatar: The Last Airbender, Ranakar in Green Lantern: First Flight, Fingers in the Batman Beyond episode "Speak No Evil", The Judge in The New Batman Adventures episode "Judgement Day"), dies at age 84.
- March 20: Jack Stokes, British animator and film director (worked on Yellow Submarine and Roobarb), dies at age 92.
- March 26: Don Payne, American screenwriter and producer (The Simpsons), dies at age 48.
- March 28: Manuel García Ferré, Argentine cartoonist and animator (Hijitus), dies at age 83.

=== April ===
- April 3: Jean Sincere, American actress (voice of Mrs. Hogenson in The Incredibles), dies at age 93.
- April 8: Greg Kramer, British-Canadian author, actor, director and magician (voice of Anton in George and Martha, Nemo in Arthur, additional voices in Tripping the Rift), dies at age 52.
- April 11: Jonathan Winters, American actor and comedian (voice of Mr. Freebus and Roger Gustav in The Completely Mental Misadventures of Ed Grimley, Grandpa and Papa Smurf in The Smurfs franchise, Coach Cadaver in Gravedale High, Wade Pig in Tiny Toon Adventures: How I Spent My Summer Vacation, The Thief in Arabian Knight, narrator in Frosty Returns, Santa Claus in Santa vs. the Snowman 3D, Old Clown in the Johnny Bravo episode "I Used to Be Funny", Sappy Stanley in the Tiny Toon Adventures episode "Who Bopped Bugs Bunny?", Stinkbomb D. Basset in the Animaniacs episode "Smell Ya Later", himself and Maude Frickert in The New Scooby-Doo Movies episode "The Frikert Fracas"), dies at age 87.
- April 13: József Gémes, Hungarian animator and film director (Heroic Times, Willy the Sparrow), dies at age 73.
- April 14: Mike Road, American actor (voice of Race Bannon in Jonny Quest, Zandor in The Herculoids, Ugh in Space Ghost and Dino Boy), dies at age 95.
- April 16: Pat Summerall, American football player and sportscaster (voiced himself in The Simpsons episode "Sunday, Cruddy Sunday"), dies from cardiac arrest at age 82.
- April 23: Philip L. Clarke, American voice actor, dies at age 74.
- April 27: Kathleen Fleming, American producer (The Lego Group), dies at age 39.

=== May ===
- May 7: Ray Harryhausen, American animator and special effects creator (Mighty Joe Young, The Beast from 20,000 Fathoms, The 7th Voyage of Sinbad, Jason and the Argonauts, Clash of the Titans), dies at age 92.
- May 13: Dr. Joyce Brothers, American psychologist, television personality, advice columnist and writer (voiced herself in The Simpsons episode "Last Exit to Springfield", and the Pinky and the Brain episode "The Pinky and the Brain Reunion Special"), dies from respiratory failure at age 85.
- May 16: Mike Stuart, British animator (The Beatles, Yellow Submarine, Teenage Mutant Ninja Turtles, The Wind in the Willows) and director (The World of Peter Rabbit and Friends, Kipper), dies at an unknown age.
- May 18: Arthur Malet, English actor (voice of Mr. Ages in The Secret of NIMH, King Eidilleg in The Black Cauldron, Jesaja in Felidae, Travelling Salesman and Major Domo in Anastasia), dies at age 85.
- May 31: Jean Stapleton, American actress (voice of Mrs. Jenkins in Pocahontas II: Journey to a New World), dies at age 90.

=== June ===
- June 11: Babi Floyd, American actor and singer (voice of Sock and Vowells Announcer in the Between the Lions episode "The Lost Rock", Face in Nick Jr., additional voices in Courage the Cowardly Dog, performed the Pokérap in Pokémon: Indigo League, announcer for Nickelodeon and Nick on CBS), dies at age 59.
- June 19: James Gandolfini, American actor and producer (voice of Carol in Where the Wild Things Are), dies from a heart attack at age 51.
- June 20: John David Wilson, British animator and animation producer (Walt Disney Company, UPA, Fine Arts Films, the animated opening sequence of Grease, Peter Pan and the Pirates), dies at age 93.
- June 21: Jerry Dexter, American actor (voice of Chuck in Shazzan, Alan in Josie and the Pussycats, Ted in Goober and the Ghost Chasers, Aqualad in Aquaman, Sunfire in the Spider-Man and His Amazing Friends episode of the same name), dies at age 78.
- June 29: Ryūtarō Nakamura, Japanese film director and animator (Serial Experiments Lain, Kino's Journey, Ghost Hound, Despera), dies at age 58.

=== July ===
- July 8: Eunice Macaulay, British animator and film producer (Special Delivery), dies at age 90.
- July 13: Cory Monteith, Canadian actor and musician (voice of Finn Hudson in The Cleveland Show episode "How Do You Solve a Problem Like Roberta?", himself in The Simpsons episode "Elementary School Musical"), dies from an alcohol and heroin overdose at age 31.
- July 14: Tonino Accolla, Italian actor (dub voice of Homer Simpson in The Simpsons), dies at age 64.
- July 22: Dennis Farina, American actor (voice of Frank Russo in The Looney Tunes Show episode "Daffy Duck, Esquire", Wildcat in the Justice League Unlimited episode "The Cat and the Canary", himself in the Family Guy episode "The Most Interesting Man in the World"), dies at age 69.
- July 30: Ron Dias, American animator and painter (worked for Don Bluth and Walt Disney Company), dies at age 76.
- July 31: Michael Ansara, American actor (voice of Mr. Freeze in the DC Animated Universe, General Warhawk in Rambo: The Force of Freedom, Vashtar in the Thundarr the Barbarian episode "Prophecy of Peril", Hiawatha Smith in the Spider-Man and His Amazing Friends episode "Quest of the Red Skull"), dies at age 91.

=== August ===
- August 5: Louis Scarborough Jr., American animator and storyboard artist (Teenage Mutant Ninja Turtles, Adventures of Sonic the Hedgehog, ChalkZone), dies at age 60.
- August 7: Hiroshi Ogawa, Japanese animator (worked for Shin-Ei Animation) and film director (Crayon Shin-chan), dies from colon infection at age 62.
- August 11: Henry Polic II, American voice actor (voice of Jonathan Crane / Scarecrow in Batman: The Animated Series, Baba Looey in Yo Yogi!, Tracker Smurf in The Smurfs), dies at age 68.
- August 19: Lee Thompson Young, American actor (voice of Jermaine in Xiaolin Showdown, Teen Bebe in The Proud Family episode "Twins to Tweens"), dies at age 29.

=== September ===
- September 16: Hiram Titus, American composer and orchestrator (ALF Tales, Attack of the Killer Tomatoes, Saban's Adventures of the Little Mermaid), dies at age 66.
- September 19: Tom McLaughlin, American animator (Eureeka's Castle), storyboard artist (The Adventures of the Galaxy Rangers, Duckman, Jumanji, DIC Entertainment), sheet timer (Warner Bros. Animation, BattleTech: The Animated Series, Aaahh!!! Real Monsters, Teenage Mutant Ninja Turtles, Iznogoud, Dino Babies, Darkstalkers, Biker Mice from Mars, Bureau of Alien Detectors, X-Men: The Animated Series, Men in Black: The Series, The Legend of Tarzan, DIC Entertainment, Cartoon Network Studios, Pet Alien, Wolverine and the X-Men, Avengers Assemble, Kaijudo), director (Space Strikers, Jumanji, Silver Surfer) and producer (Silver Surfer), dies at age 56.

=== October ===
- October 1: Tom Clancy, American novelist (voiced himself in The Simpsons episode "Diatribe of a Mad Housewife"), dies from heart failure at age 66.
- October 11: Stu Gilliam, American actor (voice of Freddie "Curly" Neal in Harlem Globetrotters, Super Globetrotters, and The New Scooby-Doo Movies, Dingdog in The Houndcats), dies at age 80.
- October 14: Ginger Dinning, American singer (sang "Blame It on the Samba" in Melody Time), dies at age 89.
- October 17: Lou Scheimer, American animation producer (founder of Filmation), voice actor (voice of Dumb Donald in Fat Albert and the Cosby Kids, Orko and Stratos in He-Man and the Masters of the Universe) and composer (He-Man and the Masters of the Universe), dies at age 84.
- October 18: Felix Dexter, English actor, comedian and writer (voice of Vulture and Hare in Tinga Tinga Tales), dies from multiple myeloma at age 52.
- October 21: José Luis Beltrán Coscojuela, Spanish comic artist and animator, dies at age 82.
- October 25: Marcia Wallace, American actress and comedian (voice of Edna Krabappel and Ms. Melon in The Simpsons, Clovis, Mrs. Cavanaugh and Didi Lovelost in Darkwing Duck, 'Dark Interlude' Actress in the Batman: The Animated Series episode "Mudslide", Mrs. Blossom in The Addams Family episode "Sweetheart of a Brother", Mrs. Wheeler in the Captain Planet and the Planeteers episode "Talkin' Trash", Oopa in the Aladdin episode "The Game", Old Woman in the I Am Weasel episode "Driver's Sped", Mrs. Beaver in The Angry Beavers episode "If You In-Sisters", Mrs. Rapple in the Rugrats episode "Lil's Phil of Trash", additional voices in Camp Candy and Monsters University), dies from pneumonia and sepsis at age 70.
- October 31: Toby Bluth, American illustrator, theatrical director, animator and background artist (Walt Disney Animation Studios, Hanna-Barbera, Banjo the Woodpile Cat, Mickey, Donald, Goofy: The Three Musketeers) and brother of Don Bluth, dies at age 73.

=== November ===
- November 28: Danny Wells, Canadian actor (voice of Bush and Raul in Heathcliff, Luigi in The Super Mario Bros. Super Show!, King Hugo III in Potatoes and Dragons, Gus in Willa's Wild Life), dies from cancer at age 72.

=== December ===
- December 3: Avo Paistik, Estonian film director, animator and illustrator (Lend, Tolmuimeja, Klaabu, Nipi ja tige kala, Klaabu kosmoses, Naksitrallid, Naksitrallid II), dies at age 77.
- December 14: Peter O'Toole, English actor (voice of Sherlock Holmes in Sherlock Holmes and the Baskerville Curse, Pantaloon in The Nutcracker Prince, Anton Ego in Ratatouille), dies at age 81.
- December 24: Frédéric Back, Canadian animator and film director (Crac, The Man Who Planted Trees), dies at age 89.
- December 26: Harold Whitaker, English animator and comics artist (Animal Farm), dies at age 93.
- December 31: James Avery, American actor (voice of Shredder in Teenage Mutant Ninja Turtles, James Rhodes/War Machine in Iron Man and Spider-Man, Haroud Hazi Bin in Aladdin), dies at age 68.

=== Specific date unknown ===
- Robert Henry, Canadian film editor (Nelvana), dies at an unknown age.

== See also ==
- 2013 in anime
