= Peter Problems =

- Family Guy episode
- Episode no.: Season 12; Episode 9
- Directed by: Bob Bowen
- Written by: Teresa Hsiao
- Production code: BACX08
- Original air date: January 5, 2014

Guest appearances
- Carrie Fisher as Angela; Marlee Matlin as Stella; Uncredited: Nev Schulman as Himself (deleted scenes)

Episode chronology
← Previous "Christmas Guy"	Next → "Grimm Job"
- Family Guy season 12

"Peter Problems" is the ninth episode of the twelfth season of the animated comedy series Family Guy and the 219th episode overall. It aired on Fox in the United States on January 5, 2014, and is directed by Bob Bowen and written by Teresa Hsiao. In the episode, Peter is fired from the brewery forcing Lois to find a job. When Peter becomes impotent, he turns to his friends for help.

As a result of Brian being brought back from the dead in the previous episode, the opening sequence returns to its normal version.

== Plot ==
At the Pawtucket Brewery, Angela tells Peter he is getting a promotion to forklift operator since Frank (the original forklift operator) retired. Peter quickly becomes a master at it. Peter treats Quagmire and Joe to fun using the forklift to make it look like Joe is walking (though Joe loses his pants in the process). Peter is then seen lifting a baby lion in a parody of The Lion King. Peter then uses the forklift in order to save a beached sperm whale. Peter carelessly impales the sperm whale with his forklift and it falls apart when Peter tries to loosen it from the lift. Peter lifts an entire vat of beer, drinks it, passes out and drives the forklift through a wall into an executive meeting within the Pawtucket Brewery's conference hall. Angela emerges from the rubble and fires Peter. Peter retaliates by calling COBRA to pay $1,300.00 a month for health insurance.

Three weeks later, Lois nags Peter about getting another job and decides to get a job of her own to help out with the bills. After Lois lands a job as an assistant manager at Stop & Shop, Peter finds himself left in charge of the household while Lois works. He washes the clothes in the dishwasher due to the washing machines in the basement drinking alcohol. Then Peter changes Stewie's diapers which Stewie considers intense. Peter then tries to make dinner while Lois is away which doesn't go well, as he cooks Chris, places Stewie in the freezer, and chops Meg's head off and places it in the microwave where it explodes. When Lois comes home and feels like having sex, Peter discovers he is unable to perform. After being humiliated by the family, he goes to see Dr. Hartman on Lois's advice to see if he has any treatments. Dr. Hartman tries to help Peter by giving him special pills (Viagra and Cialis) which do not work for him.

At the Drunken Clam, Peter tells Joe and Quagmire about him being unable to have sex with Lois and they volunteer to help him beat impotence. Quagmire tries the "Boston Method" by using a Boston jerk in order to scare it into working. It doesn't go well. Then Quagmire tries to operate Peter's penis from outside; however, Quagmire, then Joe, struggle to control it. After all attempts fail, Quagmire decides that the solution is for Peter to get his old job back since he didn't have this problem before he was fired.

At the Pawtucket Brewery, Quagmire entreats Angela to give Peter his job back where he claims that she promoted an incompetent man to operate a forklift. Angela denies Quagmire's first plea to rehire Peter ever since the incident he caused by driving a forklift into a conference room and sent two executives to the hospital. Though she is surprised to learn that Peter's firing has also made him unable to have sex with Lois. Peter then proposes getting his job back by redeeming a "redo coupon" and a "hug coupon." They succeed with the "redo coupon," but the "hug coupon" has expired, however Angela gives Peter a free hug. It was also revealed that she had hired a studio audience to replace Peter until she fires them upon Peter being rehired.

At Stop & Shop, Peter tells Lois that not only did he get his job back, but his sex drive is back. They have sex right in the store on a pile of pita breads as a passerby witnesses this and quotes "this is a cool place" as he walks away.

== Reception ==
Eric Thurm of The A.V. Club gave the episode a D, finding it lacked good jokes and had a predictable and overly long plot, with "no room for anything to actually be funny".

The episode received a 3.1 rating and was watched by a total of 5.76 million people. This made it the third most watched show on Animation Domination that night, beating American Dad! but losing to Bob's Burgers and The Simpsons with 12.04 million.
