= Into Harmony's Way =

- Family Guy episode
- Episode no.: Season 12; Episode 7
- Directed by: Brian Iles
- Written by: Julius Sharpe
- Production code: BACX06
- Original air date: December 8, 2013

Guest appearances
- Carrie Fisher as Angela; Nick Kroll as Ricky; Conan O'Brien as himself; Tony Sirico as Vinny

Episode chronology
| ← Previous "Life of Brian" | Next → "Christmas Guy" |
- Family Guy season 12

"Into Harmony's Way" is the seventh episode of the twelfth season and the 217th overall of the animated comedy series Family Guy. It aired on Fox in the United States on December 8, 2013, and is written by Julius Sharpe and directed by Brian Iles.

This episode is notable for being the first of the series where Brian Griffin is absent (as a result of his death in the previous episode, "Life of Brian"). He was replaced by Vinny in the episode and in the opening sequence. This episode continues a three-episode arc depicting Brian's death, replacement and resurrection.

== Plot ==
Quagmire asks to stay at the Griffin home after he makes eye contact with a transvestite at a bar. While hanging out with Peter, a bee makes them discover by accident that they can share a tone in harmony. After sitting down to write some songs, they go to Mort's pharmacy to get some paper and after Mort tells about his past career in music, he becomes their manager and invites them to sing at the library during open mic. He records their performance and posts the video on JewTube (a Jewish version of YouTube), scoring them an invitation to perform at a music festival. Their performance is a hit and they get an offer for a new manager named Ricky, firing Mort and going on tour over Lois' objections that she needs Peter to be with the family on Thanksgiving.

Their life on the road begins to affect Peter, causing him to arbitrarily make decisions for the two of them and causes life to become stressful for Quagmire. During a performance on Conan, Peter accidentally drops his plectrum into the sound hole, prompting an enraged Quagmire to furiously smash Peter's guitar and walk offstage, dissolving the partnership mid-performance. On Thanksgiving, Peter returns to his family and begs for forgiveness, which they accept. Quagmire shows up and asks for forgiveness as well, which Peter grants. Despite things returning to normal, Peter shoots himself in the tour bus out of regret for giving up fame while claiming to get his things.

== Reception ==
Alasdair Wilkins of The A.V. Club gave the episode a B−, saying "The end of the episode offers a timely reminder of just how insanely elastic Family Guy’s reality can be. The show has long since passed the point where the sudden reveal of a pseudo-stepfather like Larry could be considered surprising—although that doesn’t detract from its funniness as a throwaway gag—but this episode does end with Peter mulling over what it means to return to his normal, post-fame life, then promptly shooting himself. There’s only the most infinitesimal of chances that his apparent suicide will have any impact beyond its place here as a final dark punchline, but it’s still remarkable to think this is the same show that dealt with Brian’s death so seriously just two weeks prior. Family Guy is very far from perfect, but it’s still weirdly impressive that its format can stretch to include such diametrically opposite character deaths in the space of just two episodes."

The episode received a 2.7 rating and was watched by a total of 5.36 million people. This made it the second most watched show on Animation Domination that night, beating American Dad! and Bob's Burgers but losing to The Simpsons with 6.85 million.
