= No Country Club for Old Men =

- Family Guy episode
- Episode no.: Season 11; Episode 22
- Directed by: Jerry Langford
- Written by: Teresa Hsiao
- Production code: AACX21
- Original air date: May 19, 2013

Guest appearances
- Hank Azaria as Reginald Barrington; Sean Bean as the portrait of Peter Griffin's ancestor; Nick Cannon as himself; Tom Hiddleston as the statue of Peter Griffin's ancestor; Howie Mandel as himself (DVD version only); Sharon Osbourne as herself; Emma Roberts as Amanda Barrington

Episode chronology
← Previous "Roads to Vegas"	Next → "Finders Keepers"
- Family Guy season 11

"No Country Club for Old Men" is the twenty-second episode and season finale of the eleventh season and the 210th overall episode of the animated comedy series Family Guy. It aired on Fox in the United States on May 19, 2013, and is written by Teresa Hsiao and directed by Jerry Langford. In the episode, the Griffins join a country club, after Chris begins dating the daughter of Rhode Island's richest family, and Peter ends up getting Lois's father, Carter, thrown out of his beloved country club.

== Plot ==
While searching for the remote, Stewie finds his harmonica then accidentally leaves it in the bathtub. Peter accidentally sits on it causing it to get stuck in his rectum. Since it is too expensive to remove, Peter decides to make the most of the situation by performing tunes and annoying the family. He makes an appearance on America's Got Talent, and while performing the theme to Sanford and Son he does well until it is dislodged by flatulence.

Returning home, Chris hits it off with a girl named Amanda and scores an invitation for the family to the Barrington Country Club as she is a member of the Barrington family. At the club, Carter is annoyed to find Peter there and tries to kick him out until he finds they are there at the invitation of the Barrington family. Carter tries to use the opportunity to get closer to the Barringtons but only annoys them, acting towards Mr. Barrington in the manner of Chester towards Spike in the Looney Tunes cartoon Tree for Two ("You and me is pals, ain't we?"), and finally getting kicked out of the club after "wasting fruit" while attempting (poorly) to impersonate Carmen Miranda. Peter gets to take his place.

Peter invites Carter as his guest so he can laugh about him with the other members and play pranks on him. Later, Carter comes by crying that he cannot live without the country club and blames Peter for getting him kicked out. Lois extracts an apology from her father and gets Peter to put in a good word for him. Peter tries but is rejected and quits when they cannot both be members. Peter apologizes and Chris reveals that he was also cut off from Amanda. Using Brian's advice, Peter decides to make Carter bigger than Barrington so that he has to look up to him.

Arriving in a helicopter, carrying a ship, carrying a limo, with a helicopter inside, they pass themselves off in fancy uniforms as Viscount James Earl Tennisracquet and the Duke of LaCrosseteam on business with Carter. Mr. Barrington invites them into the Barrington Room and is ready to give them another chance until Peter blows their cover, angering Carter. Carter then makes Peter sing jump-rope songs about vegetables until he cries. The abuse of Peter wins Carter a second chance in the club while Peter is thrown out by Carter and Mr. Barrington as the real Viscount James Earl Tennisracquet and the Duke of LaCrosseteam have arrived only to be told of their previous arrival.

Back home, Peter is happy to be himself. As a way to end the season, Lois asks him for money for a haircut, but claims that it's too expensive and ruins it by cutting it himself.

== Reception ==
The episode was met with mixed reviews from critics. The episode received a 2.5 rating in the 18-49 demographic and was watched by a total of 5.16 million viewers. This made it the most watched show on Fox's Animation Domination line-up that night, beating two episodes of The Cleveland Show and two episodes of The Simpsons. Kevin McFarland of The A.V. Club gave the episode a C+, saying "This episode took a lot longer to get to its main plot without as many laughs along the way."

Carter Dotson of TV Fanatic gave the episode a 1.5 out of 5, saying "Perhaps the only really interesting thing about it was that we got to see a different side of Carter Pewterschmidt, a sniveling side that wants to suck up to the bigger, richer man. Yet, there's always been an undercurrent of pathetic-ness with him, so it really wasn't revealing all that much."

Mark Trammell of TV Equals gave the episode a mixed review, saying "So, not the greatest show to go out on, to be sure, but it was okay, I guess. I laughed here and there, but the main plot-lines were pretty predictable and the Chris one in particular didn’t really go anywhere."
