= Meg Stinks! =

- Family Guy episode
- Episode no.: Season 12; Episode 19
- Directed by: Bob Bowen
- Written by: Danny Smith
- Production code: BACX17
- Original air date: May 4, 2014

Guest appearances
- Jon Daly; Chris Diamantopoulos; Jackson Douglas; Jonathan Morgan Heit; Catherine Reitman; Nana Visitor

Episode chronology
← Previous "Baby Got Black"	Next → "He's Bla-ack!"
- Family Guy season 12

"Meg Stinks!" is the nineteenth episode of the twelfth season of the animated comedy series Family Guy and the 229th episode overall. It aired on Fox in the United States on May 4, 2014, and is written by Danny Smith and directed by Bob Bowen. In the episode, Meg goes for a college interview and becomes the life of a party while Brian encounters a skunk and after getting sprayed, must learn to survive in the wild.

== Plot ==
Meg and her parents attend James Woods High School's College Fair where they find out that not only is Meg considered a top student (with a B average, despite the fact that none of the teachers want to trade sex for higher grades with her), but Principal Shepherd arranged an interview for her at her first-choice college, Green Mountain College in Vermont. Peter loses a bet with Lois and has to drive Meg to the college. On the way there, Peter is his usual dismissive self towards her and does not order her any food at a diner, until he finds out that Meg knows a lot about his likes when she plays "Night Moves" by Bob Seger on the jukebox. They bond as Peter explains with stunning clarity that he had a family because he did not like to use condoms and lost out on a promising career as a podiatrist to take his loathed job at the toy factory and support his new family. Arriving at the college, they crash a party and end up missing the interview the next morning.

As Lois scolds Meg and Peter upon arriving home, Meg defends their actions because this is the first time she has ever gotten anything positive out of her interactions with her father. As Peter and Meg continue staying out and having wacky adventures, Lois warns Meg that hanging out with Peter could ruin her future. Meg dismisses Lois' concerns but Peter's exhausting stunts begin to wear on her. Soon, Meg admits that she is having trouble dealing with Peter and asks for help, but Lois insists she work it out on her own as part of growing up. Meg reschedules her college interview and tells an upset Peter that she is going on her own, preferring he be her responsible father instead of her party animal friend. Meg's narration reveals that she got into her choice college, contracted HPV her first day there and got the nickname "Warthog".

Meanwhile, Brian goes outside to read in peace and quiet because of Stewie and Chris watching Extreme Makeover: Bethenny Frankel Edition. When he hears a noise, he discovers a skunk and is sprayed. After various attempts by the Griffin family to get rid of the skunk smell on Brian fail, Lois sends an unwilling Brian to live outside until the skunk smell wears off. As Brian adjusts to living outside, he discovers he can hunt and eat in the wild after catching a hummingbird as well as run faster on all fours. As the smell fades, Brian finds he is meant to stay outdoors and starts to act like a wild dog while having a beard and long hair. An unhappy Stewie begs Brian to return to his old life; Brian refuses until a thunderstorm starts, bolting for the house.

== Reception ==
Eric Thurm of The A.V. Club gave the episode a B, saying "So this episode is called 'Meg Stinks!' The title, at first, does not bode particularly well—the Meg hatred well has simply been exhausted too many times and in too obnoxious ways, concentrated most recently in this season’s terrible "A Fistful of Meg.” There are a bunch of garden-variety 'Meg is gross' jokes in this episode about her unattractiveness and 'stupidity,' but they feel perfunctory in a way that makes them boring and mildly distracting rather than straight-up irritating, and are mostly filtered through Peter's blinkered perspective rather than simply the show pronouncing her as horrible. Mostly, 'Meg Stinks!' is a vast improvement over 'A Fistful of Meg' in almost every way, primarily because it’s actually more reminiscent of one of my favorite episodes of Family Guy: 'Road to Rupert.' Like that episode, 'Meg Stinks!' features a surprisingly effective Meg-Peter plot and, while it doesn't have an all-time great Stewie-Brian story, it’s still solid."

The episode received a 2.2 rating in the 18–49 years old demographic and was watched by a total of 4.40 million people. This made it the most watched show on Animation Domination that night, beating American Dad!, Bob's Burgers and The Simpsons.
