= Quagmire's Quagmire =

- Family Guy episode
- Episode no.: Season 12; Episode 3
- Directed by: Pete Michels
- Written by: Cherry Chevapravatdumrong
- Production code: BACX03
- Original air date: November 3, 2013

Guest appearances
- Chad L. Coleman as Black Square; Phil LaMarr as Black Guy Wearing Other Glasses; Adam Levine as himself; Rachael MacFarlane as Sonya; Robert Wu as Asian Man

Episode chronology
← Previous "Vestigial Peter"	Next → "A Fistful of Meg"
- Family Guy season 12

"Quagmire's Quagmire" is the third episode of the twelfth season and the 213th overall episode of the animated comedy series Family Guy. It aired on Fox in the United States on November 3, 2013, and is written by Cherry Chevapravatdumrong and was the last episode to be directed by Pete Michels, who had been involved with the series since its inception.

In the episode, Quagmire befriends a young woman named Sonya (voiced by Rachael MacFarlane) who has an insatiable sexual appetite and later abuses him. She abducts him into sexual slavery and Peter, Joe and Quagmire's transgender father Ida go looking for him. Meanwhile, Stewie questions his loyalty to his teddy bear Rupert when he rediscovers another toy, Oscar.

== Plot ==
Peter and Joe help Quagmire pick out a new computer at the mall. Quagmire later calls Peter for help finding his cat pictures, and his computer crashes. Taking it back for service help the next day, the clerk, Sonya, discovers his tastes in porn, and they end up on a date. They find they have much in common, but Quagmire wakes up the next morning handcuffed to the bed, discovering he was drugged to have sex and decides he's finally found his true love. Telling the guys at The Drunken Clam, they caution him to be careful. Quagmire and Sonya engage in a variety of wild sexual acts, including a reluctant Quagmire having sex with his transgender father, Ida.

At the Drunken Clam, Peter and Joe discover Quagmire hiding black eyes behind sunglasses. They tell him his sex life with Sonya is getting out of hand but Quagmire feels he can't openly share their concerns in case Sonya overhears. Leaving the Drunken Clam, Sonya meets Quagmire outside, beats him, and shuts him in the trunk of his car, claiming that she is satisfying his fantasies of being dominated and humiliated, as she drives away with him. The next day, Ida shows up at Peter's door and expresses concern that Quagmire hasn't been seen for days. Joe is also aware that Quagmire hasn't been around when their plans to hang out fell through.

The guys search for Quagmire by going to all his usual hangouts. Wandering into a seedy area, they find Sonya has a reputation for sexual instability and are directed to a storage container. Finding Quagmire suspended, beaten and gagged in Sonya's BDSM dungeon, they are cornered by Sonya, who takes Joe's gun. Joe approaches her and she pulls the trigger, but the gun doesn't fire and Joe tackles and handcuffs her, admitting that he has to keep his weapon unloaded after a prior mental breakdown. Later at the Drunken Clam, a recovering Quagmire tells Peter and Joe that in he wants to be "the kinky one" in his future relationships. He also tells them that Ida is now pregnant.

Meanwhile, Lois and the kids prepare for Halloween. While going through storage, Lois finds Stewie's first teddy bear, Oscar. Stewie rejects it until he finds himself wavering between Oscar and Rupert. Brian discovers Stewie in the attic having a tea party with Oscar and he begs Brian not to tell Rupert, claiming he is suicidal. Later, Stewie stomps downstairs after arguing with Rupert and gives him to Brian. While he is spending time with Oscar, Stewie finds Brian humping Rupert and takes him back. Rupert is then forced to choose between Stewie and Brian, falling over towards Stewie which Stewie takes as a sign of choice. Brian is indifferent and drags another one of Stewie's toys out of the room. As Stewie rejoices with Rupert, he worries about how Oscar will take the news. Oscar is seen having hanged himself in front of a painting of Stewie in the attic.

== Reception ==
Eric Thurm of The A.V. Club gave the episode a B+, saying "'Quagmire’s Quagmire' puts the viewer into something of a quagmire (I am so, so sorry). With the exception of the main plot, everything about this episode is great, and about as funny as Family Guy can be at this late date. But that plot is a doozy." Thurm also wrote that the "Rupert-Stewie-Brian B-story is probably the best part of the episode."

The episode received a 2.5 rating and was watched by a total of 4.87 million people, this made it the second most watched show on Animation Domination that night beating American Dad! and Bob's Burgers but losing to The Simpsons with 5.43 million.
