= The Most Interesting Man in the World (Family Guy) =

- Family Guy episode
- Episode no.: Season 12; Episode 17
- Directed by: Joseph Lee
- Written by: Tom Devanney
- Production code: BACX14
- Original air date: April 13, 2014

Guest appearances
- Credited: Dennis Farina as himself; Carrie Fisher as Angela; Marlee Matlin as Stella; Fred Tatasciore as John Goodman; Uncredited: Jon Cryer as Alan Harper (deleted scenes); Ashton Kutcher as Walden Schmidt (deleted scenes)

Episode chronology
← Previous "Herpe the Love Sore"	Next → "Baby Got Black"
- Family Guy season 12

"The Most Interesting Man in the World" is the seventeenth episode of the twelfth season of the animated comedy series Family Guy and the 227th episode overall. It aired on Fox in the United States on April 13, 2014, and is written by Tom Devanney and directed by Joseph Lee. The episode features Dennis Farina in one of his final appearances before his death. It is the last episode Ron Jones composed for the series, leaving Walter Murphy in charge of the musical score for future seasons.

In the episode, when Peter takes Stewie to the park for some quality father-son time, he mistakenly takes the wrong baby home, prompting Lois to call him an idiot and be fed up with him, which hurts his feelings. Determined to prove to her that he is a responsible adult, Peter goes on business trips to Chicago, New York City, San Francisco and St. Louis, returning as an intelligent, classy man.

== Plot ==
When Lois goes out with Bonnie to the shooting range (which creeped Joe out on her last visit since the target was a paraplegic man), she tells Peter to take Stewie to the park in order to spend time with him. Bored at the park, Peter decides to sneak off to The Drunken Clam when Joe and Quagmire tell him that 60 clowns have arrived, so he leaves one of his eyes at the park. When Lois calls him at the bar, he rushes out to grab Stewie but accidentally takes the wrong child (whom Stewie happened to befriend). Arriving home, he tries to cover it up in front of Lois; but she finds out just as another woman arrives with Stewie. An enraged Lois yells at Peter and calls him an idiot and fed up with him, hurting his feelings.

Commiserating with the guys at The Drunken Clam, Quagmire suggests Peter broaden his horizons. At the Pawtucket Brewery, Stella turns down Angela's order to go to Chicago for a business trip since she is planning to watch the "Deaf Games" (a boxing match where deaf boxers fight each other to death). Peter overhears and offers to go on the trip in Stella’s place, where he takes advantage of a short meeting to visit Chicago's cultural offerings. He makes many more business trips to San Francisco, St. Louis, and New York, picking up more learning until he finally returns home refined and cultured, surprising his family.

However, the new Peter's culture begins to alienate his friends and obstruct the usual family entertainment, replacing the TV with a bookcase with different books where one of them happens to be Game of Thrones. Brian finds Lois sneaking a TV and she admits that Peter has become a problem and did not make her feel dumb before. She then sends him to the dumbest city in the world, Tucson, Arizona. When he returns, he is back to normal much to the delight of Lois and Brian.

== Reception ==
Eric Thurm of The A.V. Club gave the episode a B+, saying "Most of the second half of the episode is very funny, but that doesn’t negate the fact that most of the first half of this Family Guy is spent calling attention to the laziness of its own jokes—Peter noting that he thought the clown car could only hold one person, etc. This sort of writing is good for a cheap laugh or two every once in a while, but it’s nowhere near enough to sustain an entire episode of television, let alone a series. Our reset button this week takes the form of Lois and Brian sending Peter to the dumbest city in the world to become lazy and irritating again: Tucson, Arizona. If only more episodes of the show were a bit more like its version of Chicago and less like its version of Tucson."

The episode received a 2.1 rating in the 18–49 years old demographic and was watched by a total of 4.39 million people. This made it the most watched show on Animation Domination that night, beating American Dad!, Bob's Burgers and The Simpsons.
