= Finders Keepers (Family Guy) =

- Family Guy episode
- Episode no.: Season 12; Episode 1
- Directed by: John Holmquist
- Written by: Anthony Blasucci; Mike Desilets
- Production code: BACX01
- Original air date: September 29, 2013

Guest appearances
- Yvette Nicole Brown as Treasure; Lea Thompson as Lorraine McFly

Episode chronology
← Previous "No Country Club for Old Men"	Next → "Vestigial Peter"
- Family Guy season 12

"Finders Keepers" is the first episode of the twelfth season and the 211th overall episode of the animated comedy series Family Guy. It aired on Fox in the United States and Canada on September 29, 2013, and is written by Anthony Blasucci and Mike Desilets and directed by John Holmquist. In the episode, Peter is convinced that a placemat at a restaurant is a treasure map. The rumor of supposed treasure sparks a citywide search, turning the residents of Quahog against each other.

== Plot ==
Peter arrives from work with foul breath. It affects his relationships with his co-workers and family until Lois forces him to go to the dentist. The dentist discovers a shrimp left in Peter's mouth for an entire week. To celebrate the shrimp removal, Peter and the family go out to eat at The Founding Father restaurant. The waiter tells Stewie that his place mat is a real treasure map, then tells a probably false story about Miles "Chatterbox" Musket which impresses Peter, despite Lois's insistence that it is a joke. Peter tries to recruit the guys to his hunt, but fails. As Lois comes to fetch him while digging on his own, he digs up a treasure chest. Taking it home, the family discovers it contains a clue to obtaining the treasure. Despite Brian's urging to keep it secret, Peter had already gone public, launching a citywide hunt for the treasure. When the guys try to join in, Peter sends them out on their own.

Following the clue, they join everyone else, but Brian and Stewie follow a slightly different angle on the clue. Peter and Lois start off to find the treasure, and abandon the family. Splitting off, Meg and Chris head out as well as Stewie and Brian (both took a hot air balloon and didn't join the others). Others also figure out the meaning and converge on Block Island. At the island cemetery they locate the grave of Timmy Musket, where Peter fights with the others (including Chris) to get the treasure, resulting in Lois abandoning him. Digging up Timmy Musket, they discover another clue inside the lid of the casket which leads them to Pawtucket. At McCoy Stadium, Peter arrives to find everyone else fighting, and realises that Lois was right. Peter returns to Lois and apologies. Peter explains where everyone is, but Lois deduces that they are looking in the wrong place and takes Peter to The Drunken Clam instead. Seeing a painting, Peter pries it off to discover a treasure chest that contains an expired Founding Fathers restaurant coupon. So, to cheer himself up, Peter decides to go to a strip club.

At home, the Griffins are pleased with what they have. They then receive a knock on the door, with Peter suspecting the "Hurry Up Shrimp" delivery.

== Reception ==
Eric Thurm of The A.V. Club gave the episode a C, saying "Toward the end of “Finders Keepers,” the cutaways mostly become about the cutaways themselves. Family Guy has been making that sort of self-referential joke for a while, but tonight's versions actually work pretty well, particularly when Peter uses his cutaway power in the treasure hunt by traveling via douchey promo for the Suzuki Samurai or cutting into the closed Drunken Clam. Unfortunately, the effective cutaways don't make up for the lackluster main plot, which is so formulaic it distracts from the rest of the show's ample distraction. Family Guy's cutaway-driven plasticity is kind of an all-or-nothing asset. The show's best episodes are either insane and totally continuity-less or grounded more closely in a character or relationship (most of the Stewie and Brian episodes). “Finders Keepers” is stuck in the middle, where it gets the worst of both worlds."

The episode received a 2.6 rating and was watched by a total of 5.23 million people; this made it the second most watched show on Animation Domination that night, beating American Dad! and Bob's Burgers, but losing to The Simpsons with 6.37 million.
