= Chap Stewie =

- Family Guy episode
- Episode no.: Season 12; Episode 21
- Directed by: Joe Vaux
- Written by: Artie Johann; Shawn Ries
- Production code: BACX18
- Original air date: May 18, 2014

Guest appearances
- Cary Elwes as Nigel; Isaac Hempstead-Wright as Aidan; Aaron Taylor-Johnson as Jaidan; Rick Springfield as himself; David Thewlis as British Father

Episode chronology
← Previous "He's Bla-ack!"	Next → "The Simpsons Guy"
- Family Guy season 12

"Chap Stewie" is the twenty-first episode and season finale of the twelfth season of the animated comedy series Family Guy and the 231st episode overall. It aired on Fox in the United States on May 18, 2014, and is written by Artie Johann and Shawn Ries and directed by Joe Vaux. In the episode, Peter and Chris ruin Stewie's TV time, prompting him to get revenge by travelling back in time to split Lois and Peter up so he is never conceived, but the plan goes awry when he is reborn into a British household similar to the ITV period drama Downton Abbey.

== Plot ==
Stewie and Brian are watching TV while Peter and Chris are playing 'Unga Bunga', a game where each person tries to knock over their opponent using mattresses. They knock down and destroy the TV, enraging Stewie. When Lois tries to comfort Stewie, he bites her and throws a framed picture of Meg. Meg tries to hug Stewie, only for him to headbutt her, breaking her nose and giving her a nosebleed. Lois puts Stewie in his room for an early bedtime to teach him a lesson. Stewie wishes he had never existed.

The next day, Stewie reveals to Brian that he has rebuilt his time machine and intends to stop his conception. Going three years into the past, he observes Peter with his own public access show and Lois singing its theme song. He discovers that Peter and Lois were truly in love so he sets out to ruin their relationship. After several failed schemes, Stewie finally succeeds when he gives Peter's porn collection to Goodwill and writes "Vile Woman" on the wall. Peter leaves Lois and consequently Stewie fades from existence, but is reborn into a wealthy British family.

Things are fun at first, but Stewie's new older brothers Jaidan and Aidan give him a hard time and are smarter than his old family. He is dumped to be raised by the staff including Nigel the butler and other assorted servants. Finding a pistol in his bed, he accidentally shoots the bow off a toy cat belonging to baby Cousin Earl, who vows to duel Stewie. Stewie misses his old loving family, mainly because he was the smart one. His new father is a professor at Oxford University and Stewie sets out there to use the lab to build a new time machine to save Peter's and Lois' marriage.

Stewie meets his past self and tells him about his bad alternate life. Together they remind Peter and Lois of how much they love each other by leaving Peter's "I Love You" picture to Lois in the refrigerator. Stewie says his goodbyes to his other self as a stage light falls on the British version, who then fades away. Stewie is happy to be back with his real family, before Cousin Earl appears and shoots him the arm. Chris reveals that he has spent three years reading Peter's porn collection.

== Reception ==
Eric Thurm of The A.V. Club gave the episode a B−, saying "Unfortunately, the focus on Stewie is also a bit of a double-edged sword. On one hand, it means that 'Chap Stewie' is one of the tightest episodes in recent Family Guy memory, rarely wandering off on tangents and delivering cutaways gags that are linked to the main story. On the other, the spotlight on Stewie means Brian is absent from the bulk of the episode, the main place 'Chap Stewie' fails in comparison to the earlier Family Guy stories it's trading on—without Brian to bounce off, Stewie’s more emotional stories don't work quite as well."

The episode received a 2.0 rating in the 18–49 years old demographic and was watched by a total of 3.88 million people. This made it the most watched show on Animation Domination that night, beating American Dad!, Bob's Burgers and The Simpsons.
