= Christmas Guy =

- Family Guy episode
- Stewie after saving Brian from dying.
- Episode no.: Season 12; Episode 8
- Directed by: Greg Colton
- Written by: Patrick Meighan
- Production code: BACX07
- Original air date: December 15, 2013

Guest appearances
- Joshua Rush as Boy; Tony Sirico as Vinny; Lucas Van Wormer as Kevin McCallister; Robert Wu as Asian Man; Uncredited in Deleted Scenes: Rachael MacFarlane as Girl in Hot Tub #2; Patrick Stewart as Susie Swanson; Fred Tatasciore as The Grinch; Mae Whitman as Girl in Hot Tub #1; Kari Wahlgren as Girl in Hot Tub #3

Episode chronology
← Previous "Into Harmony's Way"	Next → "Peter Problems"
- Family Guy season 12

"Christmas Guy" is the eighth episode of the twelfth season of the animated comedy series Family Guy and the 218th episode overall. It aired on Fox in the United States on December 15, 2013, and is written by Patrick Meighan and directed by Greg Colton.

The episode features the return of Brian Griffin (who had died two episodes earlier in "Life of Brian") after Stewie travels back in time to save him.

== Plot ==
The Griffin family goes to Quahog Mall for the annual Christmas Carnival, but they find the festivities have been cancelled, causing Stewie to go on a destructive rampage. Vinny learns that Carter, Lois's father, canceled the carnival. Peter confronts Carter, who tells him that it was cancelled because he despises the Christmas season. Peter vows to help Carter find his Christmas spirit. Peter tries a fake story letter, making Carter drink egg nog in a hotel room, and having him masturbate, to no effect. The turning point comes when Peter slyly tells a horrified Carter that people in Quahog are wondering if Carter is Jewish, which makes the grumpy old man reverse his position and green-light the carnival's return.

Despite being re-established at the Quahog Mall, the Christmas Carnival fails to raise Stewie's spirits. When the Mall Santa Claus asks Stewie what he wants for Christmas, Stewie realizes he wants Brian back. Vinny pretends to be Brian, acting like an intellectual and a writer, but fails to cheer up Stewie. Trying to raise his spirits, Vinny and Stewie return to the Quahog Mall, where Stewie spots his past self from a cutaway gag from a previous episode time travelling to purchase a gift. Remembering the time travel occurred prior to Brian's death, Stewie realizes he can use Past Stewie's return pad to save Brian. Vinny appeals to Past Stewie's vanity to obtain his backpack, and brings it to Present Stewie. Stewie says goodbye to Vinny, whom he and the family will no longer have met if Brian lives.

Stewie arrives in the past, saving Brian from being hit by the car. After explaining the situation to Brian, Stewie sends the return pad back to his past self in order to prevent a temporal paradox. Now unable to return and having altered his past, Stewie fades from existence as Brian thanks him for his actions. Unaware of what occurred, Past Stewie comes out of the house and wonders who Brian was talking to. In the present on Christmas Day, Brian is still alive and well, thanks to Stewie's time traveling skills. Grateful to him for saving his life, Brian thanks Stewie, who remains oblivious to the averted death, as well as his alternate self's actions.

== Reception ==
Eric Thurm of The A.V. Club gave the episode a B+, saying "Admittedly, the sweetness is undercut a bit by all the jokes about how the Griffins didn't really care about Brian, even at the end. But too much 'Christmas special' shoehorned spirit would have been empty and hollow, the way most Family Guy 'emotional' resolutions are—even leaning on the show's most compelling relationship, the whole three-episode story is a bit forced. It worked well enough for me, though. Maybe it's best to close the book on this weirdly controversial time in Family Guy history. Maybe this sort of storytelling isn't sustainable for a fan base that (not without reason, especially for Family Guy) wants similar episodes every week without being too surprised. But it'd be cool to see another show at least give it a shot, and perhaps find an audience willing to follow it to some weird places. And at the very least, I'm glad Family Guy tried something at least a bit different."

After Brian returned, Seth MacFarlane said: "Thanks for caring so much about the canine Griffin, he is overcome with gratitude." MacFarlane also said that "we'd have to be fucking high" to kill Brian permanently, hinting that killing off Brian was a gag all along.

The episode received a 3.0 rating and was watched by a total of 6.37 million people. This made it the second most watched show on Animation Domination that night, beating American Dad! and Bob's Burgers but losing to The Simpsons with 8.48 million. Including DVR playback (which added 2.21 million viewers) the episode was watched by 8.58 million viewers, and received an 18-49 rating of 4.3.
