= Boopa-dee Bappa-dee =

- Family Guy episode
- Episode no.: Season 12; Episode 5
- Directed by: Mike Kim
- Written by: Wellesley Wild
- Production code: BACX04
- Original air date: November 17, 2013

Guest appearances
- Michelle Dockery as Lady Mary Crawley; Raoul Bova as mafia leader; Ginger Gonzaga as Chris' teacher; Chris Diamantopoulos

Episode chronology
← Previous "A Fistful of Meg"	Next → "Life of Brian"
- Family Guy season 12

"Boopa-dee Bappa-dee" is the fifth episode of the twelfth season and the 215th overall episode of the animated comedy series Family Guy. It aired on Fox in the United States on November 17, 2013, and is written by Wellesley Wild and directed by Mike Kim. In the episode, the Griffins go to Italy on vacation, but Peter wants to stay there permanently, as he feels life in America has gotten boring.

== Plot ==
When the Griffins find out that the airlines are in a price war, Lois talks Peter into taking a trip to Europe. Peter is reluctant and tries to convince the family to stay home, but Lois buys a set of tickets to Italy and fools Peter into thinking they are going to a water park named "Seven Flags Atlantis" until they are on the plane.

Despite Peter's anger at being tricked, Lois tries to convince him that it's an opportunity to spark their romance. They tour Italy but Peter decides he would rather stay in the hotel room so Lois goes off without him. Brian criticizes Peter and shows him when Lois takes off with an Italian guy. Peter tries to intercept them but Lois brushes him off. Peter gets advice from Dean Martin to show him some Italian charm and approaches Lois with a new attitude; Dean promptly leaves on a piece of rigatoni singing "Volare". Lois is reluctant at first but Peter goes to great lengths and eventually wins her over. Feeling that their life has become much better, Peter burns their passports and decides the family will stay in Italy.

A month later, they have become fully integrated as Italians. Meg has even started a relationship with Mario and has brought over his brother Luigi. However, Lois worries that they are falling behind with Peter not working. The family goes to the consulate to try to get their passports back but realize that it is too difficult.

Facing an expensive trip back they decide to sneak back into America. Stowing away on a cargo ship and posing as sex dolls, they eventually make it home.

Looking back, they enjoyed their experience. The house is visited by Mario who wants Meg to take their relationship to the next level. Inside of a Super Mario video game, Meg and Mario finish a level and enter the castle where Meg finds Luigi there.

== Reception ==
Eric Thurm of The A.V. Club gave the episode a C−, saying "At first glance, the show’s more chaotic element appears to be in contrast with the tightly scripted/clichéd nature of the sitcom chestnuts it deploys en masse. But the best episodes of Family Guy manage to combine the two seamlessly. 'Boopa-dee Bappa-dee' doesn't do that, so it never rises about [sic] forgettable." The episode received a 2.2 rating and was watched by a total of 4.46 million people, this made it the most watched show on Animation Domination that night beating The Simpsons with 4.08 million.
