= Family Guy season 12 =

Family Guy
- Season 12
- DVD cover
- Showrunners: Steve Callaghan; Alec Sulkin
- Starring: Seth MacFarlane; Alex Borstein; Seth Green; Mila Kunis; Mike Henry
- No. of episodes: 21

Release
- Original network: Fox
- Original release: September 29, 2013 – May 18, 2014

Season chronology
- ← Previous; Season 11 Next → Season 13

The twelfth season of Family Guy aired on Fox from September 29, 2013, to May 18, 2014.

The series follows the Griffin family, a dysfunctional family consisting of father Peter, mother Lois, daughter Meg, son Chris, baby Stewie, and the family dog Brian, who reside in their hometown of Quahog.

During this season, Peter gets a vestigial twin ("Vestigial Peter"); the Griffins travel to Italy ("Boopa-dee Bappa-dee"); Quagmire and Peter form a folk band ("Into Harmony's Way"); and, as confirmed by series creator Seth MacFarlane, Cleveland moves back to Quahog along with his family, since The Cleveland Show was cancelled ("He's Bla-ack!"). Also, as mentioned by Steve Callaghan in the 2013 Comic-con Panel, a member of the Griffin family was killed off in a special episode. After much speculation, that member was Brian, after being run over by a car in the episode "Life of Brian". This elicited strongly negative reactions from fans of the show, and a petition demanding Brian to be resurrected garnered over 100,000 signatures. His death turned out to be only temporary as in the episode "Christmas Guy", Stewie goes back in time and saves him, effectively changing the future so that he never dies.

The show was initially airing in its usual timeslot of 9:00 PM Eastern. Beginning on March 9 and continuing for the rest of the season, Family Guy moved to 8:30 PM Eastern; the move came as a result of the addition of Cosmos: A Spacetime Odyssey to the network's lineup.

Guest stars for the season include Conan O'Brien, Lea Thompson, Jeff Daniels, Michelle Dockery, Tony Sirico, Yvette Nicole Brown, Gary Cole, Lauren Bacall, Liam Neeson, Bryan Cranston, Adam Levine, and Ariana Grande.

This is the last season to be secondarily composed by Ron Jones, leaving Walter Murphy in charge of the musical score for the rest of the series.

== Voice cast and characters ==
- Seth MacFarlane as Peter Griffin, Brian Griffin, Stewie Griffin, Glenn Quagmire, Tom Tucker, Carter Pewterschmidt, Dr. Elmer Hartman, Dan Quagmire/Ida Davis
- Alex Borstein as Lois Griffin, Barbara "Babs" Pewterschmidt
- Seth Green as Chris Griffin
- Mila Kunis as Meg Griffin
- Mike Henry as Cleveland Brown, John Herbert, Consuela, Rallo Tubbs

=== Supporting characters ===
- Gary Cole as Principal Shepard
- Carrie Fisher as Angela
- Martha MacIsaac as Patty
- Marlee Matlin as Stella
- Christina Milian as Esther
- Emily Osment as Ruth, Various
- Kevin Michael Richardson as Jerome
- Tony Sirico as Vinny
- Patrick Warburton as Joe Swanson
- Adam West as Mayor Adam West
- Sanaa Lathan as Donna Brown

== Episodes ==
No. overall	No. in season	Title	Directed by	Written by	Original release date	Prod. code	U.S. viewers (millions)
211	1	"Finders Keepers"	John Holmquist	Mike Desilets & Anthony Blasucci	September 29, 2013	BACX01	5.23
Peter is convinced that a placemat at a restaurant is a treasure map. The rumor of supposed treasure sparks a city-wide search, turning the residents of Quahog against each other.
212	2	"Vestigial Peter"	Julius Wu	Brian Scully	October 6, 2013	BACX02	5.20
When Peter finds a strange lump on his neck, it reveals to be a vestigial twin, which Peter names the vestigial twin Chip, who ends up winning over Peter's family and friends with his optimism and sense of wonder, so Peter tries numerous ways to get rid of him.
213	3	"Quagmire's Quagmire"	Pete Michels	Cherry Chevapravatdumrong	November 3, 2013	BACX03	4.87
Quagmire dates a woman named Sonja, who is just as sexually active as he is, but things go south when she kidnaps him and treats him like a sex slave, so Peter, Joe and Ida must search the back alleys of the town to rescue him. Meanwhile, Brian, Stewie and Rupert get involved in an unusual love triangle.
214	4	"A Fistful of Meg"	Joe Vaux	Dominic Bianchi & Joe Vaux	November 10, 2013	AACX22	4.18
When Meg accidentally angers a psychopathic bully named Mike Pulaski, who is threatening to kill her in a fight at the school's backyard and its up to her to defeat him in the fight. Meanwhile, Brian becomes disturbed by Peter exposing his nudity to him and to the public.
215	5	"Boopa-dee Bappa-dee"	Mike Kim	Wellesley Wild	November 17, 2013	BACX04	4.46
When the Griffins travel to Italy on vacation, Peter wants to stay there permanently, as he feels life in Quahog has gotten boring, he decides to disintegrate the passports.
216	6	"Life of Brian"	Joseph Lee	Alex Carter	November 24, 2013	BACX05	4.58
After a time travel escapade goes wrong, Stewie demolishes his time machine, but regrets his decision when Brian is fatally injured and dies after getting ran over by a car, after his passing, the family go off to purchase a new dog to substitute Brian’s place, a five year old Italian greyhound named Vinny.
217	7	"Into Harmony's Way"	Brian Iles	Julius Sharpe	December 8, 2013	BACX06	5.36
Peter and Quagmire find out that their voices create harmony when they get frightened by a bee and become a Simon & Garfunkel-style singer/songwriter duo — and, like the real Simon & Garfunkel, Peter lets fame go to his head and the duo begin feuding.
218	8	"Christmas Guy"	Greg Colton	Patrick Meighan	December 15, 2013	BACX07	6.37
When Peter tries to get Carter to repent his Christmas-hating ways, his attempts to cheer him up doesn’t go well. Meanwhile, Stewie travels back in time to save Brian's life before he got hit by the car that killed him earlier.
219	9	"Peter Problems"	Bob Bowen	Teresa Hsiao	January 5, 2014	BACX08	5.76
When Peter gets fired for crashing a forklift into a business meeting, Lois takes a job at the grocery store while Peter becomes a stay-at-home dad, which leads to a weak performance.
220	10	"Grimm Job"	Joe Vaux	Alec Sulkin	January 12, 2014	BACX09	5.22
When Stewie can’t sleep, Peter decides to tell him three fairy tale stories: Jack and the Beanstalk, Little Red Riding Hood and Cinderella.
221	11	"Brian's a Bad Father"	Jerry Langford	Chris Sheridan	January 26, 2014	BACX10	4.11
Brian's human son, Dylan, returns, now a teen TV star. Rather than be a good father to his estranged son, Brian uses his son's television connections to further his own writing career. Meanwhile, after Peter "accidentally" shoots Quagmire on a hunting trip, the two get into a fight and Joe must choose a side between him or Quagmire.
222	12	"Mom's the Word"	John Holmquist	Ted Jessup	March 9, 2014	BACX11	4.56
When Peter's mother passes away, he befriends her longtime friend, Evelyn, who then tries to seduce him. Meanwhile, Brian tries to help Stewie overcome his phobia of dying, so Brian attempts to console him by seeking out several religions and showing their beliefs on the afterlife such as visiting a synagogue, a buddhist temple, and a church, which leads Stewie to ask Brian what he believes in after death.
223	13	"3 Acts of God"	Bob Bowen	Alec Sulkin	March 16, 2014	AACX17	4.62
Peter becomes enraged when the Patriots lose their tenth consecutive game after a blown chance to win against AFC East rival Buffalo Bills, so he and the guys go on a mission to find God and ask him to stop determining the outcomes of NFL games.
224	14	"Fresh Heir"	Mike Kim	Steve Callaghan	March 23, 2014	BACX13	4.38
Lois's father Carter names Chris as his heir, but Chris replies that he doesn't want the money, much to Carter’s dismay.
225	15	"Secondhand Spoke"	Julius Wu	Dave Ihlenfeld & David Wright	March 30, 2014	BACX12	4.17
When Peter becomes requested to be the face of an anti-smoking campaign, he takes up the habit of smoking, but his smoking habit becomes worse when his face turns grey and Lois takes him to the doctor, Meanwhile, Stewie decides to help Chris face bullies at school.
226	16	"Herpe the Love Sore"	Greg Colton	Andrew Goldberg	April 6, 2014	BACX16	4.77
When Stewie and Brian become blood brothers, this leads to Stewie contracting herpes from Brian and everyone becomes disgusted at Stewie’s herpes. Meanwhile, a gang occupies Peter, Joe and Quagmire's booth at The Clam and the trio decides to fight to take it back.
227	17	"The Most Interesting Man in the World"	Joseph Lee	Tom Devanney	April 13, 2014	BACX14	4.39
Peter decides to make changes to his behavior after he returns from the park with the wrong baby, making Lois believing that his new behavior is becoming overwhelming for her and the others.
228	18	"Baby Got Black"	Brian Iles	Kevin Biggins & Travis Bowe	April 27, 2014	BACX15	4.02
Chris is forbidden to see Jerome's daughter Pam, when the duo run away together, Jerome and Peter must work together to find them.
229	19	"Meg Stinks!"	Bob Bowen	Danny Smith	May 4, 2014	BACX17	4.40
Meg parties with Peter at a college where he takes her for an interview, while Brian is forced to live in the wild after he is sprayed by a skunk and prevented from coming into the house mainly because of the skunk spray effects.
230	20	"He's Bla-ack!"	Steve Robertson	Julius Sharpe	May 11, 2014	BACX19	4.16
With his spin-off show cancelled due to low ratings, Cleveland returns to Quahog, with his new family accompanying him. When a conflict arises between Lois and Donna, it is up to Peter and Cleveland to reconcile their wives in order to save their friendship.
231	21	"Chap Stewie"	Joe Vaux	Artie Johann & Shawn Ries	May 18, 2014	BACX18	3.88
Stewie becomes enraged and throws a fit over having his TV time interrupted, so he heads back in time to see that Lois and Peter break up before he is conceived, thus he would never be born into the Griffin family. However, when he finally is born, it is into a Downton Abbey-esque household in the UK.

== Marketing ==
At San Diego Comic Con 2013, It was revealed by showrunner Steve Callaghan that one member of the Griffin Family would be killed off. Though many assumed to be Meg Griffin, the cast remained silent. This would later be revealed, with Brian Griffin being killed off. In addition, a preview was released. It was also revealed that a crossover episode with The Simpsons was in the works, which released in September 2014, titled The Simpsons Guy. The cover depicts the five members near the grave of Brian Griffin.

== Reception ==
Review grades
#	Title	Air date	The A.V. Club (A-F)	TV Fanatic (5)
1	"Finders Keepers"	September 29, 2013	C	—N/a
2	"Vestigial Peter"	October 6, 2013	C+	—N/a
3	"Quagmire's Quagmire"	November 3, 2013	B+	—N/a
4	"A Fistful of Meg"	November 10, 2013	D	—N/a
5	"Boopa-dee Bappa-dee"	November 17, 2013	C-	—N/a
6	"Life of Brian"	November 24, 2013	A-	—N/a
7	"Into Harmony's Way"	December 8, 2013	B-	—N/a
8	"Christmas Guy"	December 15, 2013	B+	—N/a
9	"Peter Problems"	January 5, 2014	D	—N/a
10	"Grimm Job"	January 12, 2014	C-	—N/a
11	"Brian's a Bad Father"	January 26, 2014	C-	—N/a
12	"Mom's the Word"	March 9, 2014	C+	—N/a
13	"3 Acts of God"	March 16, 2014	B	—N/a
14	"Fresh Heir"	March 23, 2014	D	—N/a
15	"Secondhand Spoke"	March 30, 2014	B	—N/a
16	"Herpe the Love Sore"	April 6, 2014	C-	4.6
17	"The Most Interesting Man in the World"	April 13, 2014	B+	4.6
18	"Baby Got Black"	April 27, 2014	D+	3.8
19	"Meg Stinks!"	May 4, 2014	B	4.6
20	"He's Bla-ack!"	May 11, 2014	B-	3.8
21	"Chap Stewie"	May 18, 2014	B-	4.8
