= Baby Got Black =

- Family Guy episode
- Episode no.: Season 12; Episode 18
- Directed by: Brian Iles
- Written by: Kevin Biggins; Travis Bowe
- Production code: BACX15
- Original air date: April 27, 2014

Guest appearances
- Jon Daly; Keke Palmer as Pam; Kevin Michael Richardson as Jerome; Cedric Yarbrough as Lobster; Uncredited: Tom Kane as Chief Justice (deleted scenes)

Episode chronology
← Previous "The Most Interesting Man in the World"	Next → "Meg Stinks!"
- Family Guy season 12

"Baby Got Black" is the eighteenth episode of the twelfth season of the animated comedy series Family Guy and the 228th episode overall. It aired on Fox in the United States on April 27, 2014, and is written by Kevin Biggins and Travis Bowe and directed by Brian Iles. In the episode, Chris falls in love with Jerome's daughter, Pam, much to her father's chagrin. When the two kids run away, Peter and Jerome team up to look for them.

== Plot ==
At the Drunken Clam, Peter, Quagmire, and Joe hear a news story from Tom Tucker of a kid who dies trying to stay awake playing Halo all night. Afterwards, the guys wager each other over who can stay awake the longest. To pass the time, the guys prank call Cleveland Brown and Mort Goldman over their dead wives. 62 sleep-deprived hours later, the men start to hallucinate. Joe falls asleep first as Peter and Quagmire struggle to stay awake. The next morning, Lois comes over to Quagmire's house and wakes Peter, Joe, and Quagmire up from their sleep. Peter and Quagmire review Quagmire's security camera footage and determine Peter won the bet. To celebrate, he takes the family out to eat.

When Chris goes to pick out a lobster, he and Meg bump into their classmate Pam (Keke Palmer), and her father Jerome. But when they part, Pam erotically kisses Chris. He later introduces Pam to the family as his girlfriend to Peter and Lois's unease. But at the Clam, Jerome forbids Pam from seeing Chris, and Peter accuses him of being racist, despite his objections. He invites Jerome and Pam to dinner, but Jerome strongly resists any overtures of friendship, and Peter's attempt to convince him (in a musical number) that white people have done a lot of good only makes him angrier as he drags Pam away.

The next day, Chris is infuriated and mopes over Pam as he questions whether he will ever find anyone else, and he decides to find Pam and run away with her. Meg finds a note detailing Chris' and Pam's plans and tells Peter and Jerome. As Chris and Pam hide out in a motel, they reluctantly admit to each other their shared inexperience with sex. As Peter and Jerome cruise town, they are pulled over by a cop who harasses Jerome for no reason, and Peter becomes sympathetic to Jerome having to deal with racist abuse on a constant basis. Jerome tells Peter that he can't trust white people in general and that he's being protective of his daughter, but that he's OK with Peter himself. They arrive at the motel to find Chris and Pam making out. Jerome is initially angry, but becomes taken aback when Peter sincerely says that Jerome's message of keeping races separate is correct and that Chris shouldn't even talk to black people anymore. When Peter and Pam both ask Jerome if that's the right lesson here, Jerome apologizes for overreacting and gives Pam and Chris his blessing to date, though both he and Peter are relieved that their kids did not have sex with each other (Chris apparently did a tuck with his penis that rendered the chances of lovemaking nil). Peter then invites Jerome to help him kill a completely wasted Randy Quaid who is passed out on the other bed in the motel room.

== Reception ==
Eric Thurm of The A.V. Club gave the episode a D+, saying "“Baby Got Black” is the rare episode of the show that seems like it might have maybe had a tiny impulse to say something interesting, and falls totally and utterly flat, first because, well, it’s Family Guy, and second because it’s not very funny."

The episode received a 2.1 rating in the 18- to 49-year-old demographic and was watched by a total of 4.02 million people. This made it the most watched show on Animation Domination that night, beating American Dad!, Bob's Burgers, and The Simpsons.
