= A Fistful of Meg =

- Family Guy episode
- Episode no.: Season 12; Episode 4
- Directed by: Joe Vaux
- Written by: Dominic Bianchi; Joe Vaux
- Production code: AACX22
- Original air date: November 10, 2013

Guest appearances
- Alexandra Breckenridge as Teenage Asian Girl (in DVD version); Gary Cole as Principal Shepard; Chris Cox; Jeff Daniels as himself; Scott Grimes as Michael Pulaski; Jonathan Morgan Heit; Martha MacIsaac as Patty; Christina Milian as Esther; Emily Osment as Ruth; Robert Wu

Episode chronology
← Previous "Quagmire's Quagmire"	Next → "Boopa-dee Bappa-dee"
- Family Guy season 12

"A Fistful of Meg" is the fourth episode of the twelfth season and the 214th overall episode of the animated comedy series Family Guy. It aired on Fox in the United States on November 10, 2013, and is written by Dominic Bianchi and Joe Vaux and directed by Joe Vaux. In the episode, Meg tries to get out of a fight with a tough bully while Brian retaliates against Peter for posing naked. The episode was made to reference 1987 teen comedy film Three O'Clock High.

== Plot ==
At school, Meg bumps into new student and unstable bully Mike Pulaski, and spills her lunch on him, leading him to threaten her with a showdown after school. Meg unsuccessfully tries to get out of the fight, and goes crying to the bathroom where her friends decide to abandon her for their own safety. Quagmire calls her into one of the stalls (his "base of operations") and admits to Meg that a girl named Tracey Bellings bullied him as a teenager over preferring RC Cola during the cola wars, and forced him into a long sexually abusive relationship. He decides to help Meg because he never stood up to his bully, and wants Meg to not go through the same thing. After extensive training with Quagmire, Meg faces Mike at school. Initially getting beaten up, in which her face was getting alternated, Meg grosses him out by kissing him and popping a pimple onto him before finally lifting up her shirt in front of Mike, where everyone else but him looks away, leading to him getting gruesomely melted. Although Quagmire tells Meg that she will be alive to tell the story for a "long time," Meg reveals in a narration that she dies a year later from septic shock due to her body's reaction to a frozen hot dog.

Meanwhile, Peter casually starts taking his clothes off in front of Brian as he sometimes prefers sleeping nude. Brian is disgusted by it, but Peter claims that everyone undresses in front of their dogs and points out that Brian himself is typically nude. After realizing Brian's dislike better, Peter starts harassing him in nude, going as far as to cut off his own penis to mail it to Brian in a package. At Stewie's suggestion, Brian decides to shave all of his fur off and horrifies Peter when he attempts to once again prank Brian by being naked. Seeing Brian hairless, wrinkled, and with six nipples, Lois and Chris are also terrified, so much so that Chris attempts to scratch out his own eyes. Terrified by what he has seen, Peter agrees to wear clothes at all times in front of Brian, and never harass him with nudity again. Until Brian's fur grows back in three months, Stewie allows him to wear a pair of his own clothes to keep warm.

== Reception ==
Eric Thurm of The A.V. Club gave the episode a D, criticizing the running theme of the show making fun of Meg as "distasteful," specifically taking issue with the episode's jokes as unfunny beyond a typical Family Guy offensiveness. Thurm commented positively on the side story between Brian and Peter, but opined that the latter was ultimately overshadowed by the jokes at Meg's expense.

The episode received a 2.0 rating and was watched by a total of 4.18 million people, this made it the second most watched show on Animation Domination that night beating American Dad! and Bob's Burgers but losing to The Simpsons with 4.20 million.
