= JewTube =

Video sharing website

- Company type: Private
- Website type: Video sharing
- Available in: English
- Founded: February 2, 2006
- Headquarters: Los Angeles, California, {{{location_country}}}
- Owner: Jeremy Kossen
- Website: jewtube.com
- Registration: Optional (required to upload)
- Current status: Inactive

JewTube was a free video sharing website comprising Jewish-oriented user-generated content. It offered a selection of curated Jewish-themed videos. JewTube was founded by Jeremy Kossen, a Los Angeles-based entrepreneur, and David Abitbol, founder of Jewlicious.

Visitors to the site viewed videos on a wide array of Jewish-themed content, with subjects as varied as Jewish cooking and "alternative animated endings" to the Sacha Baron Cohen film Borat.

In September 2007, Google challenged a New York City based company, NetParty, for the use of the name "JewTube", on trademark grounds, as they felt the name was too similar to that of the YouTube video sharing website. NetParty is not related or affiliated with the JewTube website. Google was successful in blocking NetParty's attempt to trademark the name.
