= Gideon Rises =

- Gravity Falls episode
- Episode no.: Season 1 Episode 20
- Directed by: John Aoshima; Joe Pitt
- Written by: Matt Chapman; Alex Hirsch; Michael Rianda
- Editing by: Kevin Locarro
- Original air date: August 2, 2013
- Running time: 24 minutes

Episode chronology
← Previous "Dreamscaperers"	Next → "Scary-oke"
- Gravity Falls season 1

"Gideon Rises" is the twentieth and final episode of the first season of the animated television series Gravity Falls. It originally aired on the Disney Channel on August 2, 2013, and was directed by John Aoshima and Joe Pitt, and written by series creator Alex Hirsch, Matt Chapman, and Michael Rianda.

The series follows twins Dipper (voiced by Jason Ritter) and Mabel (voiced by Kristen Schaal) as they spend their summer vacation at their great uncle's tourist trap, where they are introduced to the paranormal side of the town of Gravity Falls. The episode is the second part of the two-part season finale, following "Dreamscaperers", and sees Dipper and Mabel, and their great uncle Stan (voiced by Alex Hirsch), and friend Soos (voiced by Alex Hirsch) as they try to get back the Mystery Shack from their nemesis Gideon Gleeful (voiced by Thurop Van Orman).

The episode was watched by 3.2 million viewers in its original American broadcast. It was released for digital distribution as part of the series Volume 2.

== Plot ==
External videos
- Gravity Falls Full Episode S1 E20 Gideon Rises @disneyxd — Official upload of the episode onto YouTube

After Lil’ Gideon seizes ownership of the Mystery Shack (Note: As depicted in "Dreamscaperers".), the Pines family find shelter in the house of Soos’s grandmother. Gideon publicly announces his plans to replace the Shack with his own theme park called Gideonland. Grunkle Stan interrupts the event by accusing Gideon of stealing the deed but is dismissed by the sheriffs. With no other means to support the twins, Stan decides to send the twins back home to Piedmont, California.

Dipper and Mabel devise their own plan to reclaim the Shack by brokering a deal with Jeff the Gnome in exchange for Gideon as Jeff's new wife. The gnomes surround Gideon but he turns them against the twins using a dog whistle. Before throwing them out, Gideon steals Dipper’s journal, assuming it to be the first. When he discovers there are actually three, Gideon deploys a giant robot version of himself to intercept Dipper. As the twins ride a bus leaving Gravity Falls, they are soon chased down by Gideon’s robot which captures them. When Dipper denies ever owning the first journal, Gideon throws him onto a cliff, knocking Dipper unconscious before abducting Mabel. Dipper soon reawakens and jumps into the robot to confront Gideon, who is wearing a full-body suit to pilot the machine. During their fight, Dipper forces Gideon to punch himself which knocks the robot off of a bridge. The twins escape using Mabel’s grappling hook and retrieve Dipper's journal.

At the crash site, Stan exposes Gideon for having planted surveillance (whose signal disrupts Stan's hearing aid) throughout Gravity Falls using his merchandise in order to make his famously accurate predictions. The townspeople condemn Gideon, who is arrested as a fraud. After regaining the deed, Stan repairs the Mystery Shack, enabling the twins to stay in Gravity Falls. A grateful Dipper shows his journal to Stan and confesses that their summer adventures were because of its contents, but Stan laughingly dismisses the book as yet another novelty. Later that night, however, it is revealed that Stan has been searching for the journals long after owning the first. In an epilogue, the hidden vending machine door in the gift shop (Note: As first seen in "Tourist Trapped".) leads to a laboratory beneath the Shack. Stan combines all three journals to form a blueprint that activates a portal-like machine.

== Broadcast and reception ==
"Gideon Rises" isn't perfect, at least in the sense that it doesn't solve some of the issues, potential or otherwise, around the supporting cast. But it doesn't need to do that, and the reason it earns the highest grade is because it so perfectly executes the story it sets out to tell.

— Alasdair Wilkins, from The A.V. Club

"Gideon Rises" premiered on the Disney Channel on August 2, 2013, as the final episode of the first season of Gravity Falls and received a viewership of 3.2 million and a 0.5 18-49 rating in the United States.

The A.V. Club gave the episode a grade of "A", concluding "No single half-hour could wrap up all the questions Gravity Falls has raised over this season, but this episode shows an impressive knack for knowing which questions need answering and which can be safely ignored. And the biggest question it answers isn't even really on the radar until the final minutes of the episode, as Stan finally reveals just how much he's been fooling everyone all this time. Alex Hirsch nails Stan's reaction to being presented with Dipper's journal, as he can't quite mask his initial, genuine excitement before returning to his oblivious disguise. It's still not at all clear where this is all headed towards, but the show appears on the verge of changing irrevocably."

The episode was nominated for a Golden Reel Award under the category Best Sound Editing - Sound Effects, Foley, Dialogue and ADR Animation in Television.
