= Vestigial Peter =

- Family Guy episode
- Episode no.: Season 12; Episode 2
- Directed by: Julius Wu
- Written by: Brian Scully
- Production code: BACX02
- Original air date: October 6, 2013

Guest appearances
- Carrie Fisher as Angela; Patrick Stewart as Narrator

Episode chronology
← Previous "Finders Keepers"	Next → "Quagmire's Quagmire"
- Family Guy season 12

"Vestigial Peter" is the second episode of the twelfth season and the 212th overall episode of the animated comedy series Family Guy. It aired on Fox in the United States on October 6, 2013, and was written by Brian Scully and directed by Julius Wu. In the episode, Peter Griffin finds a strange lump on his neck that turns out to be a vestigial twin, who ends up winning over Peter's family and friends with his optimism and sense of wonder.

== Plot ==
When Lois tries getting Peter ready for church, she complains he keeps wearing the same old shirt, and insists that he go to the mall afterward to get new clothes. Trying on a new shirt, the salesman points out a lump on Peter's neck and Lois insists on seeing Dr. Hartman. Dr. Hartman identifies it as a twin that never fully developed and extracts it from just beneath Peter's skin so that it can talk and react to people, as Peter names him Chip.

Taking it home, he frightens the kids at first but soon gets everyone to like him. But when Chip wants to live an active life, Peter tries to get him to slow down and Lois objects to him trying to stifle Chip. Chip then has sexual activity while in bed with Peter's boss Angela and eventually gets on Peter's nerves. Peter goes back to Dr. Hartman and requests to have Chip removed despite possible risks to his own life. The operation is a success and they become separate people.

Despite Peter's attempt to encourage Chip to go his own way, the family insists Chip stay with them. Chip endears him to the family further when he rearranges the home and spends time with the family. Lois points out that Peter was once as full of life as Chip. After talking about his situation with his friends at the bar (Quagmire mistakenly thinking Chip was an African child the Griffins adopted), Peter decides to get rid of him and tries to have him eaten by a dingo. While the attempt fails, Chip realizes he is not wanted and leaves. Peter breaks the news to the family and they go search for Chip, thus leaving Peter alone.

When Peter is going to the basement he is wearing high heels, so he falls down the stairs and breaks his leg. Chip returns and finds Peter, makes a splint for his leg and drags him back upstairs. Peter is grateful for what Chip did and makes up with him. Chip decides to go out in the world and experience it for himself, thus sailing himself aloft on an orange balloon. A narration (spoken by Patrick Stewart) states that Chip has since become the new Young funny kid on ABC's The Middle.

== Reception ==
Eric Thurm of The A.V. Club gave the episode a C+, characterizing the plot as repetitive and formulaic.

The episode received a 2.5 rating and was watched by a total of 5.20 million people, this made it the second most watched show on Animation Domination that night beating American Dad! and Bob's Burgers but losing to The Simpsons with 6.42 million.
