= Life of Brian (Family Guy) =

- Family Guy episode
- Brian after he was run over by a car; the rest of the family worriedly looks at him
- Episode no.: Season 12; Episode 6
- Directed by: Joseph Lee
- Written by: Alex Carter
- Production code: BACX05
- Original air date: November 24, 2013

Guest appearances
- Yvette Nicole Brown as Black Woman with a Purse; Tony Sirico as Vinny

Episode chronology
← Previous "Boopa-dee Bappa-dee"	Next → "Into Harmony's Way"
- Family Guy season 12

"Life of Brian" is the sixth episode of the twelfth season and the 216th overall episode of the animated comedy series Family Guy. It aired on Fox in the United States on November 24, 2013, and is written by Alex Carter and directed by Joseph Lee.

The episode revolves around the death of Brian Griffin, after being run over by a car, and the family coping with the loss by adopting a replacement dog, Vinny.

== Plot ==
Brian and Stewie flee a band of hostile Native Americans in a Jeep. Brian explains that on a trip to Jamestown in the past, Stewie gave the Native Americans guns which were used to wipe out the Europeans, leaving the Native Americans in charge of America. Stewie finds his return pad destroyed by bullets and decides to ask the alternate timeline Stewie for help. Going to the equivalent of their house, they find a new time machine and pad, then return to Jamestown. As soon as their original counterparts leave, they take back the guns and return to the proper time.

Tired of their close calls, Stewie destroys his time machine at the junkyard. While there, Stewie and Brian find a street hockey net and take it home. The first time they set it up, Brian is hit and critically injured by an out-of-control driver. The Griffins learn that Brian's injuries are fatal, and the family says their goodbyes. Before he dies, Brian expresses his love for the family.

While picking up the broken pieces of the hockey net, Stewie blames himself and the Time Machine for Brian's death. Stewie tries to rebuild the time machine and use it to save Brian, but finds that his dealer is unable to supply him with needed parts due to his connection being killed for accidentally drawing Muhammad. The family and friends hold a funeral for Brian.

A month later, the Griffin family still misses Brian dearly. Lois decides the best way for them to recover is to get a new dog. Peter chooses an Italian smooth-talking dog named Vinny at the pet shop. At home, Vinny offers to make dinner and ingratiates himself with the family. At the Drunken Clam, Peter introduces Vinny to Joe and Quagmire and they become drinking buddies. Stewie is not happy with Vinny and decides to ruin him. Stewie feeds him some sad Italian news hoping to break his heart, but Chris ruins it for Stewie. Later, Vinny hears Stewie crying and realizes he is still upset over Brian. Vinny offers some comfort, talking about the death of his previous owner Leo, and proving he knows what it is like to lose a best friend. Vinny says even in the pet shop, he felt a kinship with the Griffin family. Stewie accepts Vinny into the family. That night, Vinny goes to sleep beside Stewie's bed.

== Production ==
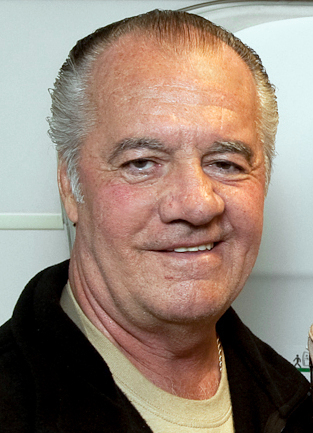
Tony Sirico guest-starred in the episode.

In November 2013, Family Guy writer Steve Callaghan told E! about why they decided to kill off Brian in the episode, saying: "Well, this was an idea that got pitched in the writer's room and it caught fire, and we thought it could be a fun way to shake things up. As soon as this idea came up, we started talking about what the next couple of episodes could be. We got very excited about the way this change will affect the family dynamics and the characters." He also explained why they decided to kill off Brian and not one of the other characters, saying: "It seemed more in the realm of a reality that a dog would get hit by a car than if one of the kids died. As much as we love Brian, and as much as everyone loves their pets, we felt it would be more traumatic to lose one of the kids, rather than the family pet."

He also discussed how the other Family Guy actors reacted when they heard Brian would be killed in the episode, saying: "I think they were glad it wasn't them. [Laughs.] I think they were surprised, as anyone would be and I think they were pretty stunned especially this far into the show. They were as shocked as anyone." He also explained why they decided to replace Brian with another dog, saying: "It felt like the way that this show was conceived by Seth all those years ago, was this entire family unit including the parents, kids and a dog. So by losing Brian, it felt like a void needed to be filled both comically and for the interpersonal relationships between all the characters. We felt that we needed to fill that role."

He went on to explain why they decided to get Tony Sirico to voice Vinny saying: "I think it was Seth's idea actually to get Tony to come in. He's a big fan of The Sopranos and always loved Tony Sirico in particular and he thought it would be fun to write a character based around his voice and his personality and just who he is as an actor." He went on to discuss if he was worried about the backlash from Family Guy fans, saying: "I'm not, only because our fans are smart enough and have been loyal to our show for long enough, to know that they can trust us. We always make choices that always work to the greatest benefit of the series."

In January 2014, Seth MacFarlane spoke about how he was surprised by the fan reaction after Brian was killed off, saying: "It surprised all of us. We were all very surprised, in a good way, that people still cared enough about that character to be that angry. We thought it would create a little bit of a stir, but the rage wasn’t something we counted on."

== Reception ==
ScreenRant ranked the episode among the “12 Worst Family Guy Episodes Ever,” highlighting the abruptness of Brian’s death and the awkward introduction of the replacement dog, Vinny. Similarly, Distractify noted that while Family Guy has produced both highly praised and poorly received episodes, this one is remembered unfavorably for its emotional missteps. The episode was also reviewed by Popdose, which criticized Brian’s death as “something that seems shocking but is really the easy way out,” highlighting the show’s poor handling of the storyline.

Eric Thurm of The A.V. Club awarded the episode an A−, saying that Brian's death scene was "actually pretty poignant, coming as close as Family Guy can to genuinely moving," and described it as "surprisingly effective… at dealing with the sudden death of a main character."

Within hours of the episode’s airing on 24 November 2013, a petition for the resurrection of Brian Griffin directed towards series creator Seth MacFarlane and Fox Broadcasting Company emerged on Change.org. The petition read, “Brian Griffin was an important part of our viewing experience. He added a witty and sophisticated element to the show. Family Guy and Fox Broadcasting will lose viewers if Brian Griffin is not brought back to the show,” and within hours had already gained thousands of signatures, making it one of the fastest-growing entertainment-related petitions on the site. In addition to petitions, fans expressed their attachment in other ways. Some viewers obtained tattoos of Brian Griffin, including memorial “RIP Brian” ink, demonstrating the strong emotional impact of his death.

The episode received a 2.2-out-of-5 rating and was watched by a total of 4.58 million people. This made it the second most-watched show on Animation Domination that night, beating American Dad! and Bob's Burgers but losing to The Simpsons, which drew 6.78 million.
