= He's Bla-ack! =

- Family Guy episode
- Episode no.: Season 12; Episode 20
- Directed by: Steve Robertson
- Written by: Julius Sharpe
- Production code: BACX19
- Original air date: May 11, 2014

Guest appearance
- Sanaa Lathan as Donna Tubbs-Brown

Episode chronology
← Previous "Meg Stinks!"	Next → "Chap Stewie"
- Family Guy season 12

"He's Bla-ack!" is the twentieth and penultimate episode of the twelfth season of the animated comedy series Family Guy, and the 230th episode overall. Written by Julius Sharpe and directed by Steve Robertson, the episode first aired on Fox in the United States on May 11, 2014. The episode features the return of Cleveland Brown after the cancellation of his spin-off The Cleveland Show. In the episode, Cleveland and his family return to Quahog, but his friendship with Peter is tested when their wives argue about parenting.

== Plot ==
Joe is bragging to the gang about his sexual exploits with Bonnie when Cleveland returns to Quahog and shows up at the Drunken Clam. Cleveland takes a round of somewhat good-natured ribbing over The Cleveland Show and its many faults, including the show's logo looking like a "purple penis"; the ratings; the series having no clear target audience; Tim the Bear not being funny and having his voice actor replaced; and the show losing to Bob's Burgers in ratings. Peter then gives Cleveland some Family Guy DVDs to bring him up to speed on what happened during his absence, adding that unlike The Cleveland Show, the Family Guy DVDs contain jokes. During the theme song, Cleveland appears and ends up taking an embittered Mort's place in the chorus line.

As Cleveland and Cleveland Jr. move back into their old house alongside Donna, Roberta, and Rallo, which had become vacant following the death of his ex-wife, Loretta, (Note: As depicted in The Cleveland Show episode "Gone With the Wind") Cleveland discovers it has been wrecked due to all of the past residents like Dan Aykroyd and Chevy Chase (Note: As depicted in "Spies Reminiscent of Us") and Ryan Reynolds, (Note: As depicted in "Stewie Goes for a Drive") and it having once been used as an orphanage. After getting things fixed, the Brown family proceeds with moving in, cleaning up and sorting things. Rallo tries to make friends with Stewie, but Stewie blows him off, calling him a ripoff of The Boondocks. Chris breaks a vase that belonged to Donna's great-grandmother over Rallo's head. As a result, he is spanked by Donna, which angers Lois, who confronts Donna. Donna accuses Lois of being a bad parent while Lois accuses her of being abusive for spanking her son. They refuse to have anything to do with each other, forbidding their husbands from socializing with each other as well, much to Peter and Cleveland's anger.

At the Drunken Clam, Joe plans for Susie's first birthday party as Cleveland walks in. Cleveland and Peter try to decide who must leave, and they decide to find a place where they can hang out without being discovered. They first try meeting on a commercial airline flight, and then later Peter poses as a police officer and pulls Cleveland over so they can talk. To make it look real, Peter beats up Cleveland dressed up as a cop while receiving some assistance from Joe, then Peter and Joe beat Cleveland ten times harder. However, both Peter and Cleveland are caught, resulting in Peter being forced to sleep on the couch after lying to Lois about it while Donna spanks Cleveland. As Chris finds Peter on the couch trying to sleep later that night, he suggests they find a way to get the wives together. Peter then initiates a conversation with Cleveland across the street using a flashlight and Morse code. Peter subsequently implements various crazy plans in an attempt to get their wives to become friends, without success.

At Susie's birthday party, they prepare for the three-legged race. While Lois wants to be Peter's partner, he really does want to be Cleveland's partner and tells Lois he is going to partner with Cleveland. When Lois attempts to protest, Peter angrily puts his foot down, with Cleveland following suit. Both men convince their wives to end their petty grudge, and enter the three legged race. But when Peter trips and hurts his ankle, Cleveland tries to carry Peter, but settles for hugging and rolling. As the wives look on, they agree to be friends for their husbands' sake, ending their feud. As Peter and Cleveland continue their rolling, they come in second place to two one-legged people who tied themselves together to form one body. Peter and Cleveland celebrate being neighbors again at the Drunken Clam and the guys once again rag on him for The Cleveland Show.

== Reception ==
The episode received a 2.1 rating in the 18–49 years old demographic and was watched by a total of 4.16 million people. This made it the most watched show on Animation Domination that night, beating American Dad!, Bob's Burgers and The Simpsons.

Eric Thurm of The A.V. Club gave the episode a B−, opining that the return of Cleveland and "the cheesy flashback montage of bro moments" between him and Peter was cynical but effective, while criticizing the numerous race jokes as subpar.
