= Teresa Hsiao =

American television writer & producer

- Born: May 26, 1985 (age 41); Indiana, U.S.
- Education: Harvard University (BA)
- Occupations: Screenwriter, executive producer
- Writing career
- Language: English

Teresa Hsiao (Chinese: 蕭韻潔, born May 26, 1985) is an American television writer and producer best known for her work on the animated series Family Guy and American Dad! and for co-creating the sitcom Awkwafina Is Nora from Queens.

== Early life and education ==
Teresa Hsiao was born in to a Taiwanese American family in Indiana and attended Harvard University, where she served on the board of Harvard Undergraduate Women in Business (HUWIB) and as editor-in-chief of Make It Happen, the organization's first national magazine. Hsiao co-founded Smart Woman Securities at the college with Tracy Britt Cool in 2006, and earned her degree in economics in 2007.

== Career ==
Hsiao has been a writer for Family Guy, We Bare Bears and American Dad!, for which she was also a producer.

She wrote frequently for The Huffington Post from 2012 through 2017.

Hsiao is the co-creator and an executive producer on the television coming of age comedy Awkwafina Is Nora from Queens. for which she had been in development with Awkwafina since 2016. The series was renewed for a second season on January 14, 2020, prior to the January 22 premiere of its first episode.

More recently, Hsiao signed an overall deal with Sony Pictures Television to develop comedy and animation for streaming platforms via her Red 136 Productions.

Recently, Hsiao co-wrote the 2023 film Joy Ride.

== Politics ==
In January 2017, Hsiao was among more than 2,000 Harvard alumni to add their names to an open letter to fellow alumnus and Senior White House advisor Jared Kushner, admonishing: "Truth. It is the guiding value of your alma mater; let it be a value in the Administration as well."
