= Stewie Griffin =

Fictional character from the Family Guy franchise

- Family Guy / Stewie character
- First appearance: "Death Has a Shadow" (1999; Family Guy)
- Created by: Seth MacFarlane
- Designed by: Seth MacFarlane
- Voiced by: Seth MacFarlane; Gilbert Gottfried ("Gilbert Gottfried" personality; in "White Meg Can't Jump")

In-universe information
- Full name: Stewart Gilligan Griffin
- Gender: Male
- Occupation: Supervillain (formerly); Scientist; Inventor; Preschool student Enterprise Car Rental Assistant Manager
- Family: Peter Griffin (father); Lois Griffin (mother); Meg Griffin (sister); Chris Griffin (brother); Brian Griffin (dog)
- Relatives: Carter Pewterschmidt (maternal grandfather); Barbara Pewterschmidt (maternal grandmother); Thelma Griffin (paternal grandmother); Francis Griffin (adoptive paternal grandfather); Mickey McFinnigan (biological paternal grandfather); Patrick Pewterschmidt (maternal uncle); Carol Pewterschmidt (maternal aunt); Chip Griffin (paternal uncle); Karen Griffin (paternal aunt); Bertram (half brother); Boston Stewie (half brother)
- Home: Quahog, Rhode Island
- Nationality: American
- Age: 1

Stewart Gilligan "Stewie" Griffin is a fictional character from the animated television series Family Guy. He is voiced by Seth MacFarlane and first appeared on television, along with the rest of the Griffin family, in the episode "Death Has a Shadow" on January 31, 1999. Stewie was created and designed by MacFarlane for the show's pilot episode.

Stewie is a highly intelligent and precocious toddler who talks and behaves like an adult. He is the third child and second son of Peter and Lois Griffin, the youngest brother of Meg and Chris Griffin, and the older half-brother of Bertram. He began the series as a megalomaniacal sociopath obsessed with violence, matricide, and world domination. As the series progressed, particularly following the direct-to-video film Stewie Griffin: The Untold Story and the two-episode arc consisting of "Stewie Kills Lois" and "Lois Kills Stewie", the more devious and violent aspects of his personality were toned down, and he evolved into a more eccentric, friendly, and flamboyant character. He also developed a close friendship with the family's anthropomorphic dog, Brian, whom he frequently antagonized in earlier episodes. Stewie is widely regarded as the show's breakout character.

On March 12, 2026, it was announced that a spin-off series centered on Stewie Griffin, titled Stewie, had received a two-season order from Fox. The series is scheduled to premiere during the 2027–28 television season.

== Role in Family Guy ==
Stewie Griffin is portrayed as a one-year-old prodigy who has a sophisticated voice, American football-shaped head, and can speak very fluently in an upper-class British accent with quite-advanced vocabulary. He reaches his first birthday in the season 1 episode "Chitty Chitty Death Bang", and the family celebrates Stewie's birthday in a cutaway gag in the season 12 episode "Chap Stewie". As Stewie's first birthday was celebrated in the episode "Chitty Chitty Death Bang", it is safe to assume that it was Stewie's second first birthday in the episode "Chap Stewie". Very highly literate and able to cite pop culture references that long predate his birth, Stewie is also entranced by Raffi and Teletubbies.

Stewie succumbs to other childish tendencies; he believes Peter has truly disappeared in a game of peekaboo, often has difficulties understanding the concept of shapes, talks to his teddy bear Rupert as if he were alive, is overcome with laughter when Lois blows on his stomach; and has no idea how to use a toilet. MacFarlane has stated that Stewie was created to represent the general helplessness of an infant through the eyes of an adult. Per cartoon physics, his ability to move objects of greater weight than himself is not surprising to other characters, nor is his apparent ability to retrieve firearms from hammerspace or his ability to talk. According to "Don't Be a Dickens at Christmas", he understands German (but cannot speak it), as his great-great-grandmother is of German descent and the Pewterschmidts (except Lois) speak it. In "The Big Bang Theory" it is revealed that he is descended from Italian polymath Leonardo da Vinci, on Lois's side of the family.

Stewie's mastery of physics and mechanical engineering is quite extraordinary and at a level of science fiction. He has constructed advanced fighter jets, mind control devices, a weather control device, a teleportation device, robots, clones, a working Transporter device from Star Trek, time machines, a Multiverse Transporter, and a shrinking pod, as well as an assortment of weapons including lasers, rocket launchers, and crossbows. Stewie employs these to cope with the perceived stresses of infant life (such as teething pain and eating broccoli) and to murder his mother, Lois, with mixed success at best depending on the objective. As made clear in the pilot episode, Stewie's matricidal tendencies are a result of Lois constantly and unwittingly thwarting his schemes, and so he desires to kill her to carry out his plans without her interference.

In other, later episodes, Stewie engages in other violent and criminal acts, including robbery, aggravated assault, carjacking, loan sharking, forgery, and killing off many minor characters (with a tank, guns, and other assorted weaponry).

Stewie eventually realizes his dreams of matricide and world domination in the sixth season two-part episode "Stewie Kills Lois" and "Lois Kills Stewie". The events are reverted in a deus ex machina ending, where most of the story turns out to be a computer simulation. Because of the rather disastrous ending for himself in the simulation, being shot and killed by Peter, he decides to put aside his outlandish plans of matricide and world domination for the time being.

Stewie shows a complete disdain for most people, especially Matthew McConaughey, but does show affection and even rare instances of kindness to his family. Such moments include his support for Meg (whom he traditionally calls "Megan") as when he chided Brian's coke-induced hostility to her ("The Thin White Line"), retracted his joke, "I hate you too, bitch" when Meg said "I hate you all" to the family ("Untitled Griffin Family History"), told his parents to stop their gross negativism on Meg's attempt at cooking and give her a chance ("Trading Places"), and wiped her tears during a weepy moment. On a more frequent basis though, Stewie constantly disrespects Meg, as he does with most elders (and as most people do to Meg), often being rude to her and subjecting her to the malice of his misbehavior, once even tricking her outside to be attacked by bees on steroids.

He generally thinks of Peter as an inferior—regarding him simply as "the fat man" and, at one point, harboring doubts that Peter could be his father ("Stewie Griffin: The Untold Story")—but does bond with him over a shared love of practical jokes made at Lois' expense ("The Courtship of Stewie's Father"). While Stewie typically regards Chris as a stooge, he considers him his only friend aside from Brian and even helped Chris to dress when he felt too shy to date ("Extra Large Medium") and assists him in dealing with bullies ("Secondhand Spoke"). In a few episodes, such as "Stewie Loves Lois", it is shown that Stewie can love his mother. In that episode, after Lois recovers and repairs a lost Rupert and serves Stewie a meal he likes, he rethinks Lois and accepts her as a loving mother. When he becomes too dependent on her, she deliberately takes no notice of him; when he hurts himself, she tries to show notice of him again, and he returns to hating her. However, at the end of the season nine premiere, "And Then There Were Fewer", when Diane Simmons is about to murder Lois for uncovering her murderous revenge scheme, Stewie secretly saves Lois by killing Diane with a sniper rifle, though he states to himself that he only did it to not miss out on the opportunity to kill Lois in the future.

Starting around season 8, Stewie starts to have a larger amount of freedom from his parents, usually spending much of his time with Brian. This extends to the point of his ability to keep pigs from parallel universes ("Road to the Multiverse") or take part in the television series Jolly Farm ("Go Stewie Go"), as compared to the first season, in which his plans were constantly hindered by Lois. In "The Hand That Rocks the Wheelchair", Stewie inadvertently clones an evil twin of himself after trying to increase his evil nature. By the end of the episode, original Stewie and evil Stewie look exactly the same, and to differentiate the two, Brian asks both to look at their feet, leading one of the twins to laugh (likely original Stewie, who typically laughs when staring at his feet) and the other twin to ask why he needed to look at his feet; seconds later, Brian shoots and kills one of the twins. It is possible that the original Stewie may have been unknowingly killed by Brian (since he cannot tell them apart) as Stewie turns to the camera with glowing yellow eyes (reminiscent of Michael Jackson's "Thriller") at the end of the episode, but this isn't referenced in later episodes, indicating that Brian very likely killed Stewie's evil twin and the yellow eyes were simply a gag.

Stewie also starts to interact with more people despite still having hatred towards many of them, as shown in cutaways in later episodes and is more flamboyant. Stewie is to be a superfan of Taylor Swift and even sets her up with Chris as a prom date. Stewie has had a few rare interactions with his pedophile elderly neighbor Herbert. Stewie intensely dislikes him and is one of the few characters fully aware of Herbert's nature, even calling him a pervert to his face. All this does, however, is move Herbert into thinking Stewie is "feisty".

In the season 16 episode "Send in Stewie, Please", it is revealed that Stewie's English accent is fake and that he has an American accent, although the follow-up joke that has him speak in numerous other voices (of Seth MacFarlane's other characters) suggests it was a mere gag.

== Development ==
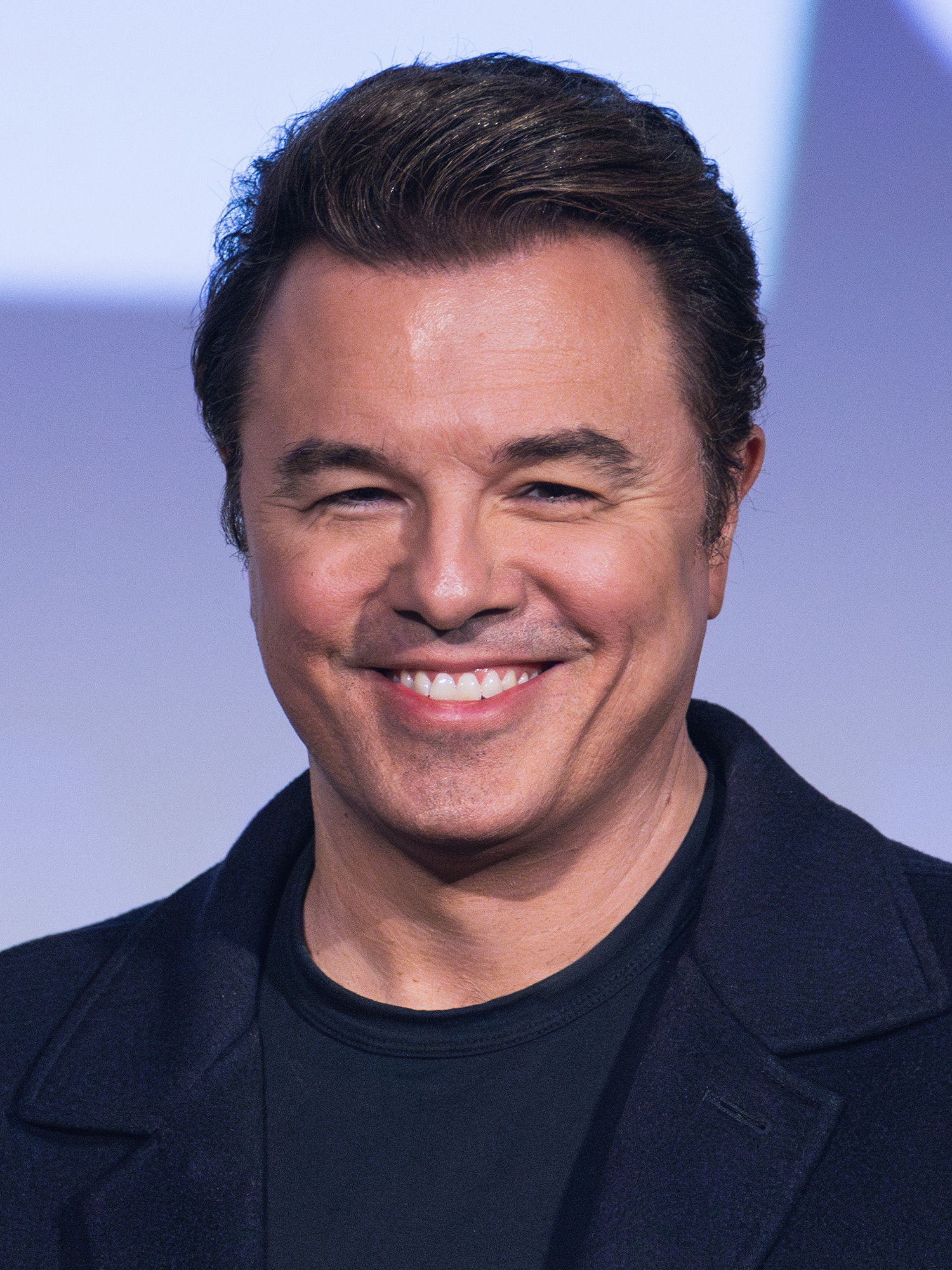
Seth MacFarlane created and voices Stewie.

Stewie is voiced by Family Guy creator Seth MacFarlane, who also provides the voices of Brian Griffin, Peter Griffin, and Glenn Quagmire as well as numerous minor characters. MacFarlane based Stewie's accent on the voice of English actor Rex Harrison, particularly on Harrison's performance in the 1964 musical drama film My Fair Lady, with further influence coming from The Simpsons character Mr. Burns. MacFarlane has also linked Stewie with David Hyde Pierce on more than one occasion, saying he wants Pierce to play Stewie if a live action version of the show would ever be created.

Stewie's head has the shape of a rugby ball. In the episode "Stuck Together, Torn Apart", a cutaway shows Stewie's head to be normally shaped, until he hits it on the ceiling while bouncing on the bed, and it is elongated into the familiar shape. Flashbacks in "Chitty Chitty Death Bang", however, show his head was already shaped like a football when he was born.

=== Ambiguous sexuality ===
Stewie's sexuality is ambiguous. When the writers began to flesh out Stewie's character beyond being a generic supervillain in season two, MacFarlane and the writers began to explore Stewie's sexuality with a series of one-off gags, which hinted in "Chick Cancer" and "We Love You, Conrad" that Stewie might be queer. One example is in the episode "Brian and Stewie", where Stewie's cellphone screensaver is of a muscular man. Another is where he has a picture of Chris Noth in his wallet and he expresses his wishes to have sexual relations with Brian's son, Dylan. In some episodes, such as "Turkey Guys" and "Send in Stewie, Please", Stewie appears to be on the verge of coming out of the closet when he is interrupted for comedic effect.

In other instances, such as when Stewie falls in love with a girl, Janet, in "Dammit Janet!", he is "a very unhappy repressed heterosexual" in Seth MacFarlane's words. In the commentary for Stewie Griffin: The Untold Story, the writers describe how they were going to make Stewie discover he was gay but decided to scrap this idea to retain Stewie's sexual ambiguity for writing purposes. MacFarlane planned for the series third season to end with Stewie coming out after a near-death experience. The show's abrupt cancellation caused MacFarlane to abort these plans, and the episode "Queer Is Stewie?" was produced, but never shown. Since that point, MacFarlane has opted to have Stewie portrayed as sexually ambiguous, as, in his eyes, the flexibility of Stewie's sexuality allows for much more freedom in terms of writing for the character. MacFarlane later elaborated:

He originally began as a diabolical villain, but then we delved into the idea of his confused sexuality. We all feel that Stewie is almost certainly gay, and he's in the process of figuring it out for himself. We haven't ever really locked into it because we get a lot of good jokes from both sides, but we treat him oftentimes as if we were writing a gay character.

— Seth MacFarlane, "Big Gay Following", The Advocate interview

When asked why he made the decision "to take Stewie from homicidal maniac to gay little song boy?", MacFarlane answered: "It wasn't a conscious decision. Characters evolve in certain ways and we found that doing the take-over-the-world thing every week was getting played out and was starting to feel a little dated. It was weirdly feeling a little '90s and believe me, if we were still doing that, the show would be on its last legs. I only half-jokingly go by the guideline that, if it's something that might ruin the show, it's a story we should probably do."

MacFarlane told Playboy "We had an episode that went all the way to the script phase in which Stewie does come out. It had to do with the harassment he took from other kids at school. He ends up going back in time to prevent a passage in Leviticus from being written: 'Thou shalt not lie with mankind as with womankind. It is an abomination.' But we decided it's better to keep it vague, which makes more sense because he's a one-year-old. Ultimately, Stewie will be gay or a very unhappy repressed heterosexual. It also explains why he's so hellbent on killing his mother, Lois, and taking over the world: he has a lot of aggression, which comes from confusion and uncertainty about his orientation."

== Reception ==
MacFarlane has been nominated for two awards for voicing Stewie Griffin. In 1999, he won a Primetime Emmy Award in the category Outstanding Voice-Over Performance. In 2006, he received an Annie Award in the Best Voice Acting in an Animated Television, Production category, for his voice work in the episode "Brian the Bachelor". In addition, Wizard magazine rated Stewie the 95th-greatest villain of all time. Stewie was also named the best Family Guy character on a list of "Top 25 Family Guy Characters" compiled by IGN. In 2010, Entertainment Weekly placed him 45th on its list of the "Top 100 Characters of the Past Twenty Years." Gay.com ranked Stewie as the fifteenth-gayest cartoon character. Hal Boedeker, a critic for The Orlando Sentinel, called Stewie "a brilliant creation". Stewie (and Brian) usually form the center-plot for the show's highest-rated and most critically acclaimed episodes, these being the Road to ... episodes. In a list of Stewie and Brian's greatest adventures, five of the Road to ... episodes occupied the top five places.

=== Allegations of plagiarized design ===
Several commentators have noticed similarities between Stewie and the title character of the graphic novel Jimmy Corrigan, the Smartest Kid on Earth (first published in 1995), including its author, Chris Ware. Ware has remarked that the similarities are "a little too coincidental to be simply, well, coincidental." He further stated, "I don't want a book of seven years' worth of my stuff to become available and then be accused of being a rip-off of Family Guy." 20th Century Fox insists that Stewie is an entirely original character. In a 2003 interview, MacFarlane said that he had never seen the comic strip before, described the similarities as "pretty shocking" and said that he could "see how [Ware] would reach that conclusion."

== Merchandise and appearances in other media ==
Stewie has been included on Family Guy T-shirts, baseball caps, bumper stickers, cardboard standups, refrigerator magnets, posters, and several other items. Stewie appears in the Family Guy Video Game!, where Stewie discovers his brother Bertram attempting to outdo him in taking over the world. Desperate to stop him, Stewie shrinks and makes his way to Bertram's lair within Peter's testicles to discover his plan, destroy his henchman cloning lab, and rescue a kidnapped Rupert from a rocket. He finally confronts Bertram in the park, where Bertram turns himself into a giant. Stewie Griffin: The Untold Story is a DVD movie about Stewie's secret and what can be his future. Stewie is also a playable character (along with Brian) in the show's second video game, Family Guy: Back to the Multiverse, where the pair travel through the multiverse again, to defeat Bertram.

Stewie appeared in the Bones season 4 episode "The Critic in the Cabernet", as the result of a brain tumor-induced hallucination that FBI Special Agent Seeley Booth (David Boreanaz) was suffering from. MacFarlane wrote all of Stewie's dialogue for the episode. The character appeared in a Coca-Cola commercial during Super Bowl XLII, he and Brian appeared in a commercial for Wheat Thins, he presented a musical number at the 59th Primetime Emmy Awards with Brian, and he appeared at the 62nd Primetime Emmy Awards. He appeared on the December 21, 2009, episode of Late Show with David Letterman to present "Top Ten Things You Don't Want To Hear From Your Child." In the 2023 animated feature film Teenage Mutant Ninja Turtles: Mutant Mayhem, Stewie was mentioned as part of a joke from Donatello to Micheangelo on how the latter's head shape was if "Stewie had a baby with Hey Arnold!". Stewie appears in the 2024 Simpsons short May the 12th Be with You. He is seen requesting to have vodka put in his juice box, only for Homer to put him in a bag and carry him off to Moe's Tavern.

== Understanding Stewie ==
There is much debate over which characters in Family Guy can understand Stewie. In an interview, MacFarlane said that everyone can basically understand him, but they ignore him or just think to themselves "oh how cute" when he talks. However, at the 2011 Comic-Con panel, he compared this to Wile E. Coyote in the classic Looney Tunes and Merrie Melodies cartoons. MacFarlane went on to say that Brian always hears Stewie, and more recently so does Chris, but the writers usually strive for Peter, Lois, and Meg (apart from "Leggo My Meg-O") not to hear him. Once Stewie leaves the house, the question of who can hear him depends very much on the story. MacFarlane also states that these rules can be broken for the sake of comedy, so this could change from one episode to another.

There are several jokes within the series revolving around whether the Griffins, other than Brian, can understand Stewie. In "E. Peterbus Unum", a student watching the episode from the distant future asks his teacher, "So, can the family understand the baby, or... what's the deal with that?" In "Inside Family Guy", Peter apologizes to the family, to which Stewie comments: "Oh that's nice of you to say". Peter replies: "Thank you, Stewie, who I can understand". In "Stewie's First Word", after Stewie utters an expletive that everyone around him can clearly understand, he eventually concludes that people can only understand him when he wants them to, namely whenever he is feeling intense emotion.
