= Brian Griffin =

Fictional character from the Family Guy franchise

- Family Guy character
- First appearance: "Death Has a Shadow" (1999)
- Created by: Seth MacFarlane
- Based on: Seth MacFarlane
- Designed by: Seth MacFarlane
- Voiced by: Seth MacFarlane; Carlos Alazraqui (Cuban-accented voice in "Phony Montana")

In-universe information
- Species: White Labrador Retriever
- Gender: Male
- Occupation: Writer
- Family: Peter Griffin (owner/best friend); Lois Griffin (owner/friend/crush); Meg Griffin (owner); Chris Griffin (owner); Stewie Griffin (owner/best friend/frenemy)
- Children: Dylan Flannigan (son)
- Relatives: Biscuit (deceased mother); Coco (deceased father); Scout (uncle); Jerry (deceased brother); Unnamed Siblings; Jasper (cousin); Ricardo (cousin-in-law); Scrappy Brian (deceased nephew)
- Religion: None (atheist)
- Home: Quahog, Rhode Island
- Nationality: American
- Education: Brown University
- Age: 10 (70 in dog years)

Brian Griffin is a fictional character from the American animated sitcom Family Guy. He is one of the main characters of the series and a member of the Griffin family. Created, designed, and voiced by Seth MacFarlane, he is an anthropomorphic white Labrador Retriever who is the best friend of both Peter and Stewie Griffin and comic foil with the ability to speak, sing, drive, and stand on two legs.

Brian first appeared on television, along with the rest of the Griffin family, in the series premiere "Death Has a Shadow" on January 31, 1999. MacFarlane was asked to pitch a pilot to the Fox Broadcasting Company, based on The Life of Larry and Larry & Steve, two shorts made by MacFarlane featuring a middle-aged character named Larry and an intellectual dog, Steve. These two characters were redesigned and renamed Peter and Brian, but they retained similar voices and personalities.

Brian has been featured in many items of merchandise for Family Guy, and he is considered to be one of the series' biggest merchandising characters. He has also made crossover appearances in other MacFarlane-produced shows, such as American Dad! and The Cleveland Show, as well as a few other shows, such as The Simpsons, Futurama, and South Park.

As a character, Brian was initially well-received by critics and fans, praised for his dry wit, intelligence, and sarcastic humor. In later years, his reception became more mixed, with many criticizing his pretentious, self-righteous, narcissistic, and hypocritical behavior. When Brian was killed off in the season 12 episode "Life of Brian", the events of the episode received substantial attention from the media and elicited strongly negative reactions from fans of the series. However, it turned out to be temporary, as he made his return to the series just two episodes later in "Christmas Guy", after Stewie traveled back in time to save him.

== Role in Family Guy ==
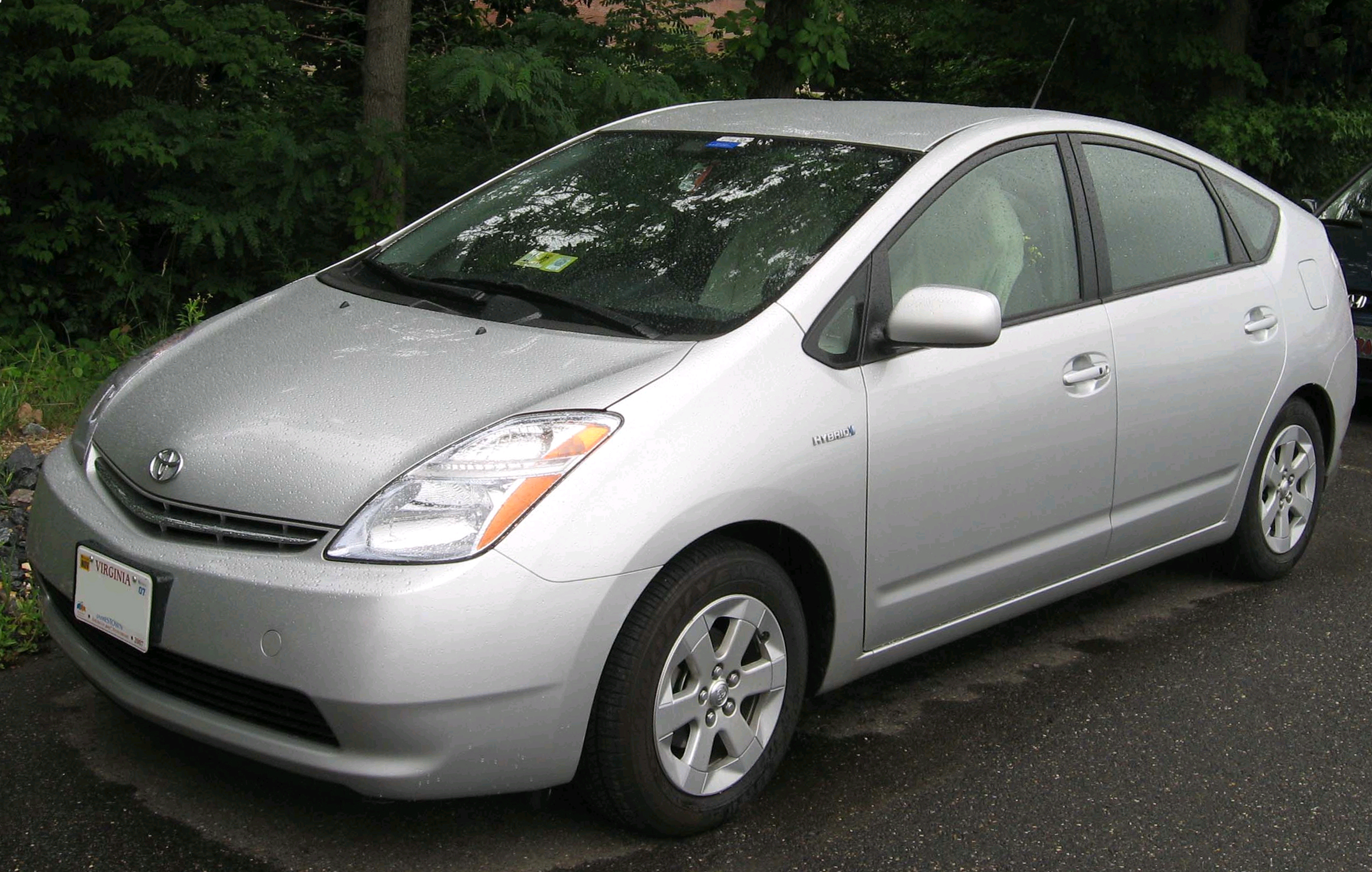
A Toyota Prius, similar to the one Brian drives

Brian is a white-furred anthropomorphic dog. He can talk, generally walks on his hind legs (using his front legs as arms), has opposable thumbs, drives a second-generation Toyota Prius (with the license plate "BRI-DOG"), and is often portrayed as the only sane person in his family. He is the pet dog of the Griffin family, and in keeping with the series's treatment of anthropomorphic characters, Brian's human attributes receive little acknowledgment and no explanation; he is largely treated as a human character. Brian is the best friend of both Peter and Stewie, and many of the series' sub-plots center around the latter pairing. They are occasionally at the center of the plot, like in the "Road to..." episodes. Brian and Stewie have a love–hate relationship in which they constantly argue and humiliate each other, and yet are irreplaceable in each other's lives. In the episode "Brian and Stewie", they admit that they love each other as friends and give each other's lives purpose.

Brian is an alcoholic and very fond of dry martinis; he is seen to have withdrawal symptoms in various episodes when he is told or forced to stop drinking. He smokes occasionally, although in the episode "Mr. Griffin Goes to Washington", after seeing Peter promoting a corrupt cigarette company, he quit smoking, a habit he resumed at the end of that episode. He also regularly smokes marijuana. After a brief stint as a drug-sniffing dog, he developed a cocaine addiction, but after spending time in rehab he managed to achieve sobriety.

He is the son of Coco and Biscuit, who were normal dogs, though Brian's human attributes have been present since his puppyhood. He claims his father was a racist. Brian received an Ivy League education, having attended Brown University, as seen in "Brian Goes Back to College", but dropped out one course away from graduating. He is also an Iraq War veteran because Stewie signed them both up for the Army in "Saving Private Brian". Family Guy uses a floating timeline in which the characters do not age much, so the series is always assumed to be set in the current year. However, several of the characters, such as Meg Griffin, have aged two to three years since the series' pilot episode, while others, such as Stewie and Brian, have aged very little. At the start of the series, Brian was 6, but he is currently 10 years old. Despite his intelligence, Brian has shown conventional dog behavior on occasion. He greatly fears the vacuum cleaner which Lois refers to as "Mr. Hoover", he once ran excitedly into the kitchen when Meg shook a bag of dog food in "Barely Legal", and in the episode "Bill & Peter's Bogus Journey" it is revealed that Brian can only defecate and urinate on the Griffins' front lawn.

In several episodes, events have been linked to specific times, although this timeline has been contradicted in subsequent episodes. An example of this is when in "Brian: Portrait of a Dog", Peter is shown in a flashback finding a fully grown Brian as a stray. In "The Man with Two Brians", Brian tries to regain attention from the Griffin family by showing them home videos of him as a puppy, although none of the videos of him as a puppy showed any member of the Griffin family, so it is possible that the videos were filmed by a previous owner. Brian also has a human son named Dylan, who is a regular marijuana smoker, before Brian manages to turn Dylan's life around from a violent, uneducated teenager to an eloquent and kind-hearted young man. Their relationship becomes strained over time as Brian distances himself from Dylan, until he learns that his son has been cast in a television show and uses Dylan to land a job as a writer for the show. Stewie is very confused as to how Brian as an 8-year-old dog can have a teenage son, and Brian's remark about it being in dog years confuses him even further.

Brian is a political liberal, who supports legalizing marijuana, gay marriage and ending the war on terror. He is also an atheist, although in the episode "April in Quahog" he starts praying out of panic when news anchors Tom Tucker and Diane Simmons announce that the world will end (later revealed to be an April Fools' joke). In "Brian and Stewie", Brian revealed that he voted for John McCain in 2008.

Despite once being portrayed as having a high intellect, more recent episodes have depicted Brian as having an average-at-best intelligence and being a fraudulent intellectual, such as pretending to be well-read or understanding concepts he does not, such as the multiverse theory in "Road to the Multiverse". While he often tries to show his intelligence, he is frequently corrected by others (mainly Stewie). After taking the SATs for Meg, it is revealed that Brian actually scored the lowest in the class, which causes him to have an identity crisis; the low SAT score is later explained by Brian having a brain tumor at the time. He has since been generally insecure about his intelligence and will sometimes take credit for some of Stewie's achievements in order to make himself look smart.

In later seasons Brian has entered into a feud with Quagmire. At first, it was merely Quagmire hating Brian while the latter at least made the attempt to be civil, however after one too many insults Brian snaps and begins returning the hatred.

Brian sees himself as a romantic and has had several relationships over the years, mainly with human women like Rita, Ida, Padma, and Kate. Although, in "Brian Dates a Bitch", he falls for female show-dog Ellie. In his romantic pursuits, Brian will often abandon his own personal beliefs and personality in order to make himself more appealing to the women he is attracted to, sometimes even resorting to lying in order to make himself look good. These relationships often end badly due to his inflated ego or being caught in a deception.

His longest-lasting relationship was with Jillian Russell, a beautiful but dimwitted girl who Brian dated in season 5. He eventually moves in with her but is unable to pay rent in season 6. This eventually leads to a fight when Brian reveals he did not want to move in with her. He later tries to win her back but discovers she is now dating Adam West, leaving him heartbroken.

Brian's most significant relationship was with Jess Schlotz, a woman diagnosed with terminal cancer who Brian meets in a bar in "Married... with Cancer". As Jess had only a little time left to live, Brian agrees to help her with her bucket list and the two fall in love. The couple eventually get married as Jess's time grows shorter, a decision Brian later regrets when Jess's doctor says she will make a full recovery. Brian is deeply depressed following the marriage, becoming overweight and emotionally distant to the point where Jess brings him to the pound to be put down. The two remain married until Jess' death, which occurs during a commercial break.

=== Writing career ===
Brian is an aspiring but struggling writer—this is said to be a reference to Snoopy from Peanuts, and reflective of a younger MacFarlane. Brian is unemployed, but he is often seen writing various novels, screenplays, or essays. His difficult writing career and apparent lack of talent is used as a recurring joke throughout the series. In the episode "Play it Again, Brian", Brian wins an award for an essay he wrote, though he later admits that he plagiarized the piece.

In the episode "Movin' Out (Brian's Song)", Brian starts writing his book Faster Than the Speed of Love, which is revealed to be a rip-off of the Iron Eagle films, specifically Aces: Iron Eagle III.

In the episode "420", Brian finally publishes Faster Than the Speed of Love with Carter Pewterschmidt's help and the novel is shipped, but it is critically panned and does not sell a single copy.

In the episode "Dog Gone", he receives an invitation from the Rhode Island Society for Special Literary Excellence to an award ceremony celebrating his novel. Brian, convinced that he is a great writer, attempts to gain the family's interest in this piece of news but fails to do so. Once he arrives at the "award ceremony", however, he discovers that he has misunderstood the meaning of the word "special".

In the episode "Brian Griffin's House of Payne", he writes a television script entitled "What I Learned on Jefferson Street", and it is shown to CBS who picks it up after reading it. Although the script is good, the finished product is not as James Woods is selected to be the lead instead of Elijah Wood and CBS turns Brian's dramatized script into a farcical comedy piece revolving around Woods going back to college where he is roommates with a monkey named Mr. Nubbins.

In the episode "Brian Writes a Bestseller", Brian writes a bestselling self-help book, Wish It, Want It, Do It, which he writes in a few hours and consists mostly of blank pages. The book is an immediate success, but Brian lets the fame go to his head. He eventually causes the downfall of his book's popularity when interviewed on Real Time with Bill Maher and things go back to normal. Brian mentions it again in "Yug Ylimaf" in order to get a girl.

Brian's latest literary attempt came in the episode "Brian's Play", where he writes a play titled A Passing Fancy. The play becomes very popular in Quahog; however, Brian is upset when he realizes that Stewie writes a play that is better than his. Stewie's play is eventually shown on Broadway. Brian becomes depressed, as he wants to be a good writer for the few remaining years he has, and doesn't want to be overshadowed by Stewie, who has his whole life ahead of him.

== Character ==
=== Creation ===
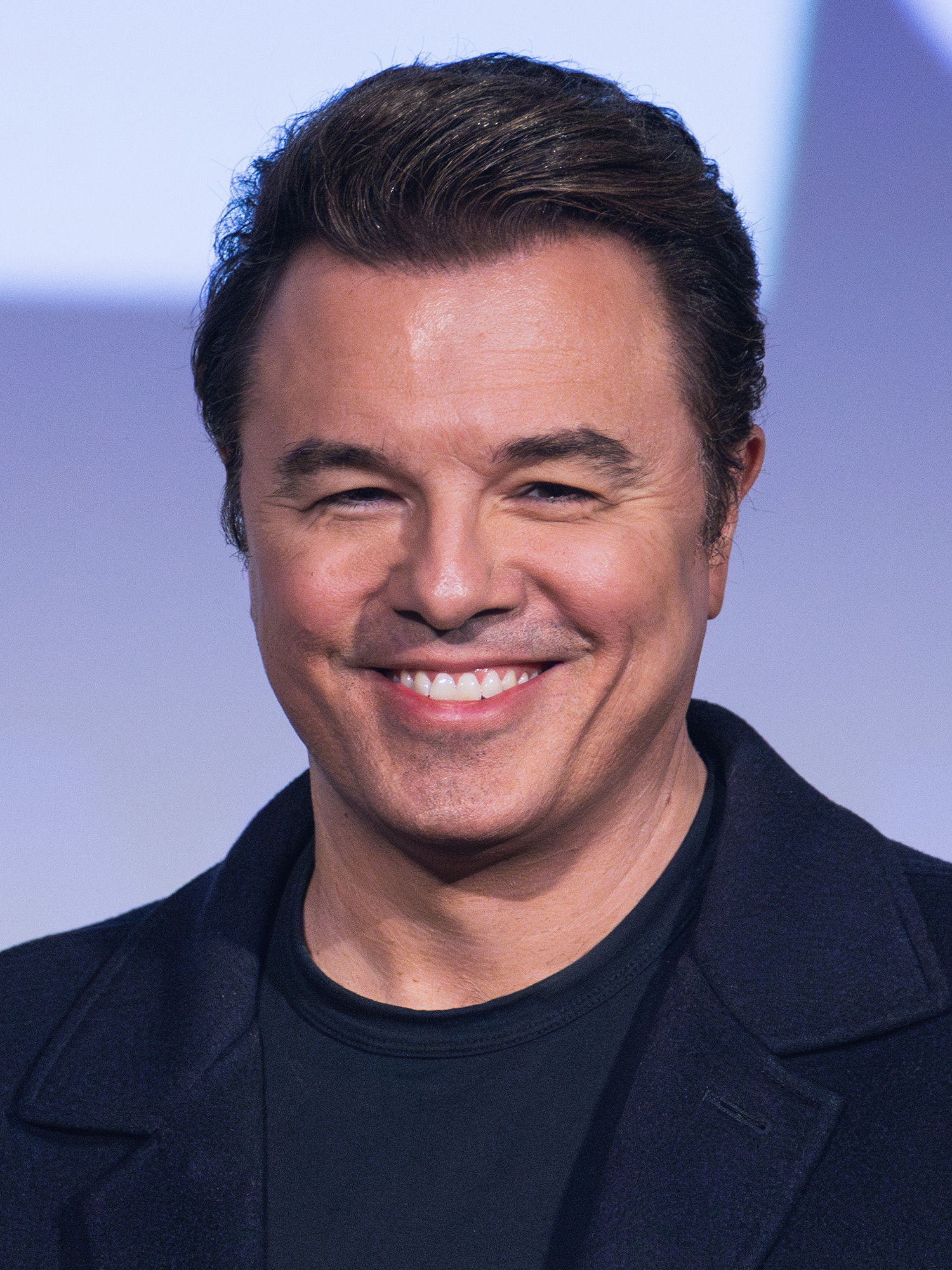
Series creator Seth MacFarlane created and voices Brian.

Family Guy creator Seth MacFarlane created a cartoon short entitled Life of Larry. The short centered around a middle-aged man named Larry and his anthropomorphic dog Steve. In 1997, when MacFarlane was working for Hanna-Barbera Studios, writing for shows such as Johnny Bravo, Dexter's Laboratory, and Cow and Chicken, he made a sequel to Life of Larry. The short caught the eye of 20th Century Fox representatives, who asked him to create a TV series revolving around the characters. MacFarlane received a US$50,000 budget to develop a pilot for the show, which was, as MacFarlane stated in a 2006 interview, "[...] about one twentieth of what most pilots cost". MacFarlane claims to have drawn inspiration from several sitcoms, namely The Simpsons and All in the Family. Several premises were also carried over from several 1980s Saturday-morning cartoons he watched as a child, namely The Fonz and the Happy Days Gang, and Rubik, the Amazing Cube.

In three months, MacFarlane created the Griffin family and developed a pilot for the show he called Family Guy. Brian's character was largely based on Steve, and Larry would be the main inspiration for the Peter character.

=== Voice ===
The voice of Brian is provided by series creator Seth MacFarlane, who also provides the voices of many other characters including Peter Griffin, Stewie Griffin, and Glenn Quagmire. Brian's voice is MacFarlane's normal speaking voice. William H. Macy auditioned unsuccessfully for the role.

In the episode "Road to the Multiverse", Brian was voiced by Japanese actor Kotaro Watanabe in a scene in an alternate universe where everything is Japanese (due to an American defeat in the Second World War).

== Reception ==
"Man's best friend is a poor understatement when it comes to dealing with Peter's constant mission to paint the world with all sorts of stupid. You'd think witnessing so much anti-thought would cut the poor guy a break, but no. And that's part of the character's charm: Always being on hand for the solid quip or sarcastic commentary. Having lived with the Griffins for many years, and being accepted (and audibly heard more than Stewie for some reason) as a peer, Brian has become a character as important to fans as the show's titular star."

— Ahsan Haque, IGN

Ahsan Haque of IGN has given Brian a positive review, calling him the best talking man-dog. He also praised Brian's adventures with Stewie calling them, "center of many of the show's best bits". Haque later made a list titled "Family Guy: Stewie and Brian's Greatest Adventures", where he stated that "Brian and Stewie paired together has always been a winning formula for Family Guy". They also praised the selection of Brian to play Chewbacca as they stated in the "Blue Harvest" review. In their list of "What Else Should Family Guy Make Fun Of?", IGN commented that Brian would be perfect to play Q, if Family Guy ever decides to make a James Bond parody. In a review of the seventh season, Haque wrote that Brian "unfortunately was terribly misused this season. He's degenerated into nothing more than a soapbox for the political views of the writers". In a review of the eighth season, following his transition into a heel character, Ramsey Isler stated that Brian "left his lofty position as the voice of reason and switched to pretentious loser".

Emily St. James of The A.V. Club praised the Brian character, and stated that "Brian has always been the show's best character and its most developed one". In a 2004 interview, Seth MacFarlane noted his similarities to Brian. He also revealed that Brian is his favorite character, because he feels most comfortable when playing that role.

=== Commendations ===
In IGN's "Family Guy: Top 10 Fights", Brian's fight with Stewie in the episode "Patriot Games" (season 4, 2006) is ranked number 5. In IGN's "Top 10 musical moments in Family Guy", Brian ranked number 6, number 5, and number 3 with the songs, "The Freakin' FCC" from "PTV" (season 4, 2005), "Never Gonna Give You Up" from "Meet the Quagmires" (season 5, 2007) and "This House Is Freakin' Sweet" from "Peter, Peter, Caviar Eater" (season 2, 1999), respectively. In a list of the Top 25 Family Guy characters compiled by IGN, Brian was placed second on the list (behind Stewie). They stated that "man's best friend is a poor understatement" with regards to Brian.

=== Death and resurrection ===
Brian's death was the main focus in the season twelve episode "Life of Brian". After Stewie destroys his time machine because of the risks of changing history and losing their lives, Brian and Stewie arrive home with a street hockey net they had found in a dump, where Stewie destroyed his time machine for good. As he is setting it up, Brian is struck by a reckless driver in a hit and run and later succumbs to his injuries at the veterinary clinic. Stewie is unable to rebuild the time machine as he cannot acquire a new power supply. After a month of mourning the loss of their beloved pet, the family replaces Brian with a new dog, named Vinny. The death of Brian in the episode "Life of Brian" was met with massive opposition and anger from Family Guy fans around the world, many of whom threatened to boycott the show due to Brian's absence. Family Guy's official Facebook and Twitter pages were bombarded with messages and comments from fans demanding that they bring Brian back. Hostile messages were also directed towards Family Guy's producing staff, including the show's creator, Seth MacFarlane. MacFarlane later thanked fans "for caring so much about the canine Griffin, he is overcome with gratitude." Fan petitions sprang up within hours of "Life of Brian"'s first airing, also receiving media attention including most prominently a Change.org petition directed towards Seth MacFarlane, making the petition one of the fastest-growing entertainment-related petitions on the site, attracting over 120,000 signatures.

Two episodes later in "Christmas Guy", Stewie still misses Brian dearly and spots a past incarnation of himself who has traveled forward in time to Christmas (an event referenced in "Life of Brian"). Stealing the time machine's return pad from his past self while Vinny provides a distraction, Stewie goes back in time and saves Brian's life, at the cost of erasing himself from history. Brian is extremely grateful for being saved, but Stewie of this timeline finds Brian's affections unnerving, not knowing the reason behind them. The episode ends with the family sitting around their Christmas tree with everything back to normal. After "Christmas Guy" aired, Seth MacFarlane tweeted, "you didn't really think we'd kill off Brian, did you? Jesus, we'd have to be fucking high."

== In other media ==
Brian is featured in a Family Guy parody in the South Park episodes "Cartoon Wars Part I" and "Part II". The scene depicted a conversation between Peter and Brian leading to one of the show's trademark cut-away gags; like Peter, Brian was rendered in the distinct animation style of South Park. Brian also appeared in one episode of Seth MacFarlane's other animated sitcom, American Dad!, titled The People vs. Martin Sugar. When Stan Smith begins to mention his list of "Top 10 Fictitious Dogs", with the last one being Brian, he briefly appears confused asking Stan, "Uh, do I know you?", which is an homage to MacFarlane himself since he voices both characters. Brian and the rest of the family appear in The Simpsons episode "Homerland" as guests in the season 25 premiere.

Brian was also featured, along with Stewie, in advertisements for Wheat Thins and Cool Whip. He and Stewie also introduced the 2007 Emmy Awards with a song which recapped the events in television, over the past year. The song was adapted from the one sung by Brian, Stewie and Peter in the Family Guy episode "PTV".

=== Merchandise ===
Brian is featured on the Family Guy: Live in Vegas CD, and also plays a significant part in Family Guy Video Game!, the first Family Guy video game, which was released by Sierra Entertainment in 2006. He (along with Stewie) features at the center of Family Guy's second video game, Family Guy: Back to the Multiverse.

MacFarlane recorded exclusive material of Brian's voice and other Family Guy characters for a 2007 pinball machine of the show by Stern Pinball. In 2004, the first series of Family Guy toy figurines was released by Mezco Toyz, each member of the Griffin family had their own toy, with the exception of Stewie, of whom two different figures were made. Over the course of two years, four more series of toy figures have been released.

As of 2009, six books have been released about a Family Guy universe, all published by HarperCollins since 2005. This include Family Guy: It Takes a Village Idiot, and I Married One (ISBN 978-0-7528-7593-4), which covers the entire events of the episode "It Takes a Village Idiot, and I Married One", and Family Guy and Philosophy: A Cure for the Petarded (ISBN 978-1-4051-6316-3), a collection of seventeen essays exploring the connections between the series and historical philosophers. which include Brian as a character. A book written from Brian's point of view (actually written by Andrew Goldberg) was published in 2006. It was called Brian Griffin's Guide to Booze, Broads and the Lost Art of Being a Man.

== See also ==
- Author surrogate
- Talking animals in fiction
