= List of Family Guy home video releases =

This is a list of English language Family Guy DVDs from regions 1, 2, and 4.

== Season releases ==
=== Region 1 (U.S. and Canada) ===
Title	Release date	Episodes	Season(s)
Volume One	April 15, 2003	28	1 & 2
This four-disc box set includes all 28 episodes from Seasons 1 and 2 ("Death Has a Shadow" – "Fore Father"). Special features include 8 audio commentary tracks, Internet promo spots, and a behind-the-scenes featurette. Also available on UMD.
Volume Two	September 9, 2003	22	3
This three-disc box set includes all 22 episodes from Season 3 ("The Thin White Line" – "Family Guy Viewer Mail #1"), including the previously un-aired episode, "When You Wish Upon a Weinstein". Special features include 6 audio commentary tracks, deleted scene animatics, seven minutes of the unaired pilot pitch, and two featurettes. Also available on UMD.
Volume Three	November 29, 2005	13	4A
This three-disc box set includes the first 13 episodes from Season 4 ("North by North Quahog" – "Jungle Love"). Special features include 10 audio commentary tracks, 2 featurettes, deleted scene animatics, multi-angle table reads, storyboard/animatic comparisons, and unrated audio.
Volume Four	November 14, 2006	14	4B
This three-disc box set includes the remaining 14 episodes from Season 4 ("PTV" – "The Griffin Family History"), excluding the three that make up Stewie Griffin: The Untold Story. Special features include commentary on every episode, multi-angle scene studies, deleted scenes, 3 featurettes, unrated audio, and a DVD-ROM link to exclusive content.
Volume Five	September 18, 2007	13	5A
This three-disc box set includes the first 13 episodes from Season 5 ("Stewie Loves Lois" – "Bill and Peter's Bogus Journey"). Special features include commentary on every episode, 3 animatic episodes with optional commentary, deleted scenes, 2 featurettes, and unrated audio.
Volume Six	October 21, 2008	12	5B & 6A
This three-disc box set includes the remaining five episodes of Season 5 and seven episodes of Season 6 ("No Meals on Wheels" – "McStroke"), excluding Blue Harvest. Special features include commentary on every episode, deleted scenes, featurettes, the original televised version of each episode, unrated audio, 3 animatic episodes with optional commentary, and the "Family Guy 100th Episode Special".
Volume Seven	June 16, 2009	13	6B & 7A
This three-disc set includes the remaining four episodes of Season 6 and the first nine episodes of Season 7 ("Back to the Woods" – "The Juice Is Loose"). Special features include commentaries on every episode, deleted scenes, and featurettes including footage from Comic-Con 2008.
Volume Eight	June 15, 2010	15	7B & 8A
This three-disc set includes the remaining seven episodes of Season 7 and the first eight episodes of Season 8 ("Fox-y Lady" – "Dog Gone"). Special features include commentaries on select episodes, deleted scenes, and karaoke musical sing-a-longs from past musical moments in the show. The Best Buy version includes Stewie Griffin: Best Bits Uncovered. The Target version includes a Q&A with Seth MacFarlane and friends at PaleyFest 2010.
Volume Nine	December 13, 2011	14	8B & 9A
This three-disc set includes the remaining eleven episodes of Season 8 and the first three episodes of Season 9 ("Business Guy" – "Welcome Back, Carter"), excluding Something, Something, Something, Dark Side and Partial Terms of Endearment. Special features include commentaries on select episodes, deleted scenes, side-by-side animatics, featurettes including footage from Comic-Con 2010, and The Cleveland Show episode "The Way the Cookie Crumbles" with a special introduction from Mike Henry.
Volume Ten	September 25, 2012	14	9B
This three-disc set includes the remaining fourteen episodes of Season 9 ("Halloween on Spooner Street" – "Foreign Affairs"), excluding It's a Trap!. Special features include commentaries on select episodes, deleted scenes, side-by-side animatics, and featurettes including Adam West Star Ceremony.
Volume Eleven	September 24, 2013	23	10
This three-disc set includes all twenty three episodes of Season 10 ("Lottery Fever" – "Internal Affairs"). Special features include commentaries on select episodes, deleted scenes, side-by-side animatics, and featurettes including Looking Back to the Pilot.
Volume Twelve	December 17, 2013	22	11
This three-disc set includes all twenty two episodes of Season 11 ("Into Fat Air" – "No Country Club for Old Men"). Special features include commentaries on select episodes, deleted scenes, side-by-side animatics, and featurettes including 200 Episodes Later.
Season Twelve	December 9, 2014	21	12
This three-disc set includes all twenty one episodes of Season 12 ("Finders Keepers" – "Chap Stewie") Special features include commentaries on select episodes, deleted scenes, a full episode animatic for "Christmas Guy", and featurettes including Brian Griffin: In Memoriam... Sort of. The volume title has been changed to "Season Twelve" instead of "Volume Thirteen."
Season Thirteen	December 8, 2015	18	13
This three-disc set includes all eighteen episodes of Season 13 ("The Simpsons Guy" – "Take My Wife"). Special features include commentaries on select episodes, deleted scenes, a full episode animatic for "Stewie, Chris, & Brian's Excellent Adventure", and featurettes including On the Road to Springfield: The Making of "The Simpsons Guy".
Season Fourteen	December 6, 2016	20	14
This three-disc set includes all twenty episodes of Season 14 ("Pilling Them Softly" – "Road to India"). Specials features include deleted scenes, commentaries on select episodes, The Art of Family Guy featurette and a full episode animatic for "A Lot Going on Upstairs".
Season Fifteen	November 7, 2017	20	15
This three-disc set includes all twenty episodes of Season 15 ("The Boys in the Band" – "A House Full of Peters"). Special features include deleted scenes, Family Guy Remembers Carrie Fisher, and an Adam West tribute.
Season Sixteen	December 4, 2018	20	16
This three-disc set includes all twenty episodes of Season 16 ("Emmy-Winning Episode" – "Are You There God? It's Me, Peter"). Special features include deleted scenes and a full episode animatic for "Three Directors".
Season Seventeen	December 10, 2019	20	17
This three-disc set includes all twenty episodes of Season 17 ("Married...with Cancer" – "Adam West High"). Special features include deleted scenes, This Reminds Me of That Time... 20 Years of Family Guy's' Greatest Cutaways, "You Can't Handle the Booth!" Alternate Episode Without Character Commentary, and commentary on "You Can't Handle the Booth!"

=== Region 2 (UK and Ireland) and Region 4 (Australia, New Zealand and Mexico) ===
Title	Release dates		Episodes	Broadcast Season(s)	Classifications			
Title	Region 2 (UK/ROI)	Region 4 (AUS/NZ)	Episodes	Broadcast Season(s)	BBFC	IFCO	OFLC (AUS)	OFLC (NZ)
Season One	November 12, 2001	October 20, 2003	14	1 & 2A	15	15	M	M
This two-disc set contains 14 of the 15 episodes from the first production season ("Death Has a Shadow" – "Holy Crap", "Love Thy Trophy" – "The King Is Dead", "If I'm Dyin', I'm Lyin'", and "Running Mates"), excluding "There's Something About Paulie". The episodes are presented in their original production order, though the latter 7 were initially aired as part of the second broadcast season. No special features. The discs are also available separately in region 4.
Season Two	January 27, 2003	August 2, 2004	15	2B & 3A	15	15	M	M
This two-disc set contains the remaining 14 episodes from the second broadcast season ("Da Boom", "Brian in Love", "I Am Peter, Hear Me Roar", and "A Picture is Worth 1,000 Bucks" – "Fore Father"), including "There's Something About Paulie". The episodes are presented in broadcast order, followed by the previously un-aired episode "When You Wish Upon a Weinstein". No special features. The discs are also available separately in region 4.
Season Three	July 21, 2003	May 2, 2005	21	3B	15	15	M	M
This three-disc set contains all 21 episodes from the third broadcast season ("The Thin White Line" – "Family Guy Viewer Mail#1"), excluding "When You Wish Upon a Weinstein", which was initially delayed from the second season. The episodes are presented in broadcast order. No special features. The discs are also available separately in region 4.
Season Four	April 24, 2006	May 29, 2006	13	4A	15	15	MA15+	M
This three-disc set includes the first 13 episodes from Season 4 in broadcast order ("North by North Quahog" – "Jungle Love"). Special features include 10 audio commentary tracks, 2 featurettes, deleted scene animatics, multi-angle table reads, and storyboard/animatic comparisons.
Season Five	October 30, 2006	November 1, 2006	14	4B	15	15	M	M
This three-disc box set includes the remaining 14 episodes from Season 4 in broadcast order ("PTV" – "Untitled Griffin Family History"), excluding the three that make up Stewie Griffin: The Untold Story. Special features include commentary on every episode, and over 40 deleted scenes.
Season Six	October 15, 2007	October 17, 2007	13	5A	15	15	MA15+	M
This three-disc box set includes the first 13 episodes from Season 5 in broadcast order ("Stewie Loves Lois" – "Bill and Peter's Bogus Journey"). Special features include commentary on every episode, 3 animatic episodes with optional commentary, deleted scenes, and 2 featurettes.
Season Seven	November 10, 2008	December 10, 2008	12	5B & 6A	15	15	MA15+	M
This three-disc set includes the remaining five episodes of Season 5 and seven episodes of Season 6 in production order ("No Meals on Wheels" – "McStroke"), excluding Blue Harvest. Special features include commentary on every episode, deleted scenes, featurettes, the original televised version of each episode, 3 animatic episodes with optional commentary, and the "Family Guy 100th Episode Special".
Season Eight	November 2, 2009	September 29, 2009	13	6B & 7A	15	15	MA15+	R13
This three-disc set includes the remaining four episodes of Season 6 and the first nine episodes of Season 7 in broadcast order ("Back to the Woods" – "The Juice is Loose"). Special features include commentaries on every episode, deleted scenes, and featurettes including footage from Comic Con 2008.
Season Nine	November 1, 2010	August 17, 2010	15	7B & 8A	15	15	MA15+	R13
This three-disc set includes the remaining seven episodes of Season 7 and the first eight episodes of Season 8 ("FOX-y Lady" – "Dog Gone"). Special features include commentaries on every episode, deleted scenes, and two featurettes: "The Multiverse Effect" and "Family Guy Sings-A-Long Karaoke".
Season Ten	May 9, 2011	June 15, 2011	15	8B & 9A	15	18	MA15+	R13
This three-disc set includes the remaining 12 episodes of Season 8 and the first 3 episodes of Season 9 ("Business Guy" – "Welcome Back, Carter"), excluding Something, Something, Something, Dark Side but including the banned episode "Partial Terms of Endearment". Commentary on six episodes, deleted scenes, animatics, three featurettes and the American Dad! episode "Tearjerker" comprise the special features. Also available as a special edition featuring alternative cover art with a bonus T-shirt and script from the season. Also, this is the first Family Guy DVD to receive an 18 certificate in Ireland, but this is due to the content in the bonus features, not the episodes.
Season Eleven	November 7, 2011	February 29, 2012	14	9B	15	15	MA15+	R13
This three-disc set includes the remaining 15 episodes of Season 9 ("Halloween on Spooner Street" – "Foreign Affairs"). Excluding It's a Trap!. The special features are animatics for the episodes "Baby, You Knock Me Out" and "Trading Places". It also contains deleted scenes, 20 "Clips-to-Go" and The Cleveland Show episode "Beer Walk!". Also available as a special edition featuring alternative cover art with a bonus T-shirt and script from the season.
Season Twelve	November 4, 2013	October 2, 2013	23	10	15	15	MA15+	R13
This three-disc set includes all 23 episodes of Season 10 alongside deleted scenes and audio commentaries. A special DVD cover is available within the UK, and there is also a special edition exclusive to HMV that contains a T-shirt and a script of the episode "Back to the Pilot". JB Hi-Fi has also released a limited special edition in Australia and New Zealand, which includes the DVD and a T-shirt, labeled as a "Collector's Edition".
Season Thirteen	June 9, 2014	May 14, 2014	22	11	15	15	MA15+	R13
This three-disc set includes all 22 episodes of Season 11. A special DVD Cover from JB Hi-Fi is available aside the standard DVD cover. Special features include 200 Episodes Later, 200th Episode Table Read, Commentary by Series Writers, Directors, Producers and Cast Members on Selected Episodes, Deleted Scenes and many more.
Season Fourteen	November 10, 2014	December 10, 2014	21	12	15	15	MA15+	R16
This three-disc set includes all 21 episodes of Season 12.
Season Fifteen	November 16, 2015		18	13	15	15	MA15+	R16
This three-disc set includes all 18 episodes of Season 13.
Season Sixteen	November 7, 2016	November 30, 2016	20	14	15	15	MA15+	R16
This three-disc set includes all 20 episodes of Season 14.
Season Seventeen	November 6, 2017	November 8, 2017	20	15	15	15	MA15+	R16
This three-disc set includes all 20 episodes of Season 15.
Season Eighteen	November 5, 2018	November 21, 2018	20	16	15	15	MA15+	R13
This three-disc set includes all 20 episodes of Season 16. Special features include deleted scenes which cannot be watched per episode. The DVD release for this region comes in NTSC format. It's also the first to have no specially printed labels, only plain text.
Season Nineteen	December 9, 2019	December 11, 2019	20	17	15	15	MA15+	R13
This three-disc set includes all 20 episodes of Season 17. The DVD release for this region comes in NTSC format. It also does not have specially printed labels, only plain text.

== Special episodes ==
The following are special extended episodes produced for the direct-to-DVD market, and as such are not included in the above season sets.

Title	Release dates			Classifications			
Title	Region 1 (US/CAN)	Region 2 (UK/ROI)	Region 4 (AUS/NZ)	BBFC	IFCO	OFLC (AUS)	OFLC (NZ)
Stewie Griffin: The Untold Story	September 27, 2005	October 24, 2005	January 25, 2006	15	15	M	M
This is a direct-to-DVD movie in which Stewie tries to find his real father after a life-changing incident. Special features include an unrated audio track, full-length commentary by cast and crew, animatic comparisons, and previews for Family Guy and American Dad!. Also available on UMD.
Blue Harvest	January 15, 2008	January 21, 2008	February 8, 2008	15	15	MA15+	M
This is the special hour-long Star Wars parody season six premiere, featuring extended scenes and an unrated audio track. Special features include a full-length commentary, an interview with Seth MacFarlane and George Lucas, an "Introduction to Family Guy" featurette, and the animatics of the episode. Some region 2 discs might also include the episode North by North Quahog. Exclusive to the special edition release are an exclusive brochure, collectable packaging, 3-D glasses and footage, a themed T-shirt and trading cards. Easter eggs include table reads and a teaser trailer for Something, Something, Something, Dark Side. Also included is an extra DVD with a digital copy. This release received a 15 rating from the BBFC due to the bonus featurette and the audio commentary track, but the episode itself was only rated 12, as was the UMD release.
Something, Something, Something, Dark Side	December 22, 2009	December 26, 2009	December 23, 2009	15	15	MA15+	M
The special hour-long parody of The Empire Strikes Back, and sequel to Blue Harvest. Special features include a pop-up video, a featurette, the animatics of the episode, deleted scenes, and a sneak peek of It's a Trap!. This is also the first Family Guy episode/special to be released on High Definition Blu-ray.
It's a Trap!	December 21, 2010	December 27, 2010	December 21, 2010	15	15	M	M
The special hour-long parody of Return of the Jedi, and sequel to Something, Something, Something, Dark Side. Also available on Blu-ray.
Partial Terms of Endearment	September 28, 2010	n/a	n/a	N/A	N/A	n/a	
This one-disc DVD contains the episode "Partial Terms of Endearment" from the show's eighth season, which was banned from broadcast on U.S. television, and subsequently excluded from the regular region 1 DVD sets. Special features include a commentary track, animatic, table read and deleted scenes from the episode, plus "The Seth and Alex Almost-Live Comedy Show" and nine original songs composed for Family Guy. To date, the episode is available in region 1 only on this disc, but was included on the region 2/4 Season Ten sets.

== Compilations ==
Title	Release dates			Episodes	Classifications		
Title	Region 1 (US/CAN)	Region 2 (UK/ROI)	Region 4 (AUS/NZ)	Episodes	BBFC	IFCO	OFLC
The Freakin' Sweet Collection	December 14, 2004	April 25, 2005	September 20, 2005	5	15	15	M
This is a five-episode anthology including the episodes "When You Wish Upon a Weinstein", "Road to Rhode Island" (including the restored scene involving Osama bin Laden), "To Love and Die in Dixie", "I Am Peter, Hear Me Roar", and "Lethal Weapons". The set includes new commentaries and previews for Family Guy Season 4 and American Dad! (including its complete pitch reel unavailable anywhere else). Also available on UMD.
Live in Vegas	April 26, 2005	May 25, 2005	May 16, 2005	n/a	12	N/A	n/a
This album includes a bonus DVD that contains the music video "Stewie's Sexy Party", the making of the album and the making of the video.
Off the Cutting Room Floor	April 25, 2006	n/a	n/a	12	N/A	N/A	n/a
A bonus disc included with copies of American Dad! Volume 1, with features relating to Family Guy Volume Three. It includes 24 never-before-released deleted scenes, an inside-the-recording-booth featurette, guest star interviews, and storyboards for the episode "North by North Quahog".
Family Guy Uncovered	n/a	n/a	June 28, 2006	14	15	15	M
This is a two-DVD set containing all the special features from the region 1 Volume 1–2 that were omitted from the region 2/4 sets. It features 14 uncensored episodes, all with audio commentaries. Also included are 28 deleted scenes, animatics, 7 Fox Network promos and 4 featurettes.
Happy Freakin' Christmas	n/a	October 16, 2006	December 6, 2006	2	12	12	M
This is a two-episode DVD with festive-themed episodes. It contains the episodes "A Very Special Family Guy Freakin' Christmas" representing Christmas and "Da Boom" representing New Year. It has one special feature: a 7-minute clip show entitled "The Best of Stewie" with Seth MacFarlane explaining Stewie at different stages.
A Very Special Family Guy Freakin' Christmas	September 26, 2008	n/a	n/a	2	N/A	N/A	n/a
This f.y.e.-exclusive one-disc DVD contains the episode "A Very Special Family Guy Freakin' Christmas" plus the American Dad! episode "The Most Adequate Christmas Ever".
Stewie Griffin: Best Bits Exposed	n/a	October 13, 2008	n/a	4	15	15	n/a
This one-disc DVD contains the Stewie-themed episodes "Chitty Chitty Death Bang", "The Tan Aquatic with Steve Zissou", "Stewie Loves Lois", and "The Courtship of Stewie's Father". Also available with a bonus digital copy.
Peter Griffin: Best Bits Uncovered	n/a	October 20, 2008	n/a	4	12	15	n/a
This one-disc DVD contains the Peter-themed episodes "Let's Go to the Hop", "E. Peterbus Unum", "Mr. Griffin Goes to Washington", and "PTV". Also available with a bonus digital copy.
Peter Griffin vs. the Giant Chicken	2009	n/a	n/a	3	N/A	N/A	n/a
This f.y.e.-exclusive one-disc DVD contains the episodes "Da Boom", "Blind Ambition" and "No Chris Left Behind", which each feature a fight sequence between Peter and Ernie the giant chicken.
Stewie Kills Lois and Lois Kills Stewie	May 19, 2009	n/a	n/a	2	N/A	N/A	n/a
This f.y.e.-exclusive one-disc DVD contains the two-part episode "Stewie Kills Lois" and "Lois Kills Stewie". Special features include "Making of the 100th Episode" and "Top 10 Countdown" featurettes, deleted scenes, a table read, and promo spots.
Laugh It Up, Fuzzball: The Family Guy Trilogy	December 21, 2010	December 27, 2010	December 21, 2010	3	15	15	MA15+
This box set contains all three Star Wars parodies: Blue Harvest, Something, Something, Something, Dark Side and It's a Trap!. Also available on Blu-ray.
Road to the North Pole	November 7, 2011	November 7, 2011	November 30, 2011	2	15	15	MA15+
This one-disc DVD, released exclusively to F.Y.E in the US, contains the two-part Christmas episode "Road to the North Pole", plus a bonus episode of The Cleveland Show, "Murray Christmas". It was subsequently released worldwide.
Family Guy: Best Of	n/a	November 5, 2012	November 21, 2012	12	15	15	MA15+
A three-disc DVD set featuring Seth MacFarlane's ten hand-picked favorite episodes ("To Love and Die in Dixie", "Barely Legal", "Road to Germany", "PTV", "Road to the Multiverse", "I Dream of Jesus", "Meet the Quagmires", "The Griffin Family History", "When You Wish Upon a Weinstein" and "Road to Rhode Island"), the "Road to the North Pole" double-length holiday episode chosen as the top fan-favorite episode, and all-new bonus content—including the "Seahorse Seashell Party" episode yet to be featured on DVD.
Ho Ho Holy Cr*p!	December 3, 2013	November 4, 2013	November 20, 2013	3	15	15	MA15+
This one-disc DVD features three-holiday themed episodes: "Jesus, Mary and Joseph!" and "Thanksgiving" from Family Guy and a bonus episode from American Dad!, "Seasons Beatings".
20 Greatest Hits	January 8, 2019	n/a	January 16, 2019	16	n/a	n/a	MA15+
Released for the series' 20th anniversary in 2019, this DVD features various twenty episodes that include prominent musical numbers. Special features include a 'Music Machine' featuring a large range of music from the series, 3 lyric videos and a featurette titled "300 Episodes, Two Cancellations, and One Mural". In Australia, retailer JB Hi-Fi included an exclusive lyric booklet packaged inside the DVD.

== Anthologies ==
Title	Release dates			Seasons	Classifications		
Title	Region 1 (US/CAN)	Region 2 (UK/ROI)	Region 4 (AUS/NZ)	Seasons	BBFC	IFCO	OFLC
Family Sized DVD Collection	n/a	October 31, 2005	n/a	1–3	15	15	M
This box set contains Season 1–3 plus the 2-disc Family Guy Uncovered set.
The Complete Collection	n/a	April 24, 2006	n/a	1–4A	15	15	n/a
This box set contains the Season 1–4 sets plus Family Guy Uncovered.
Collector's Pack	n/a	October 30, 2006	November 15, 2006	1–4	15	15	MA15+
This box set contains the Season 1–5 sets plus Family Guy Uncovered. The region 4 release was also available with an exclusive backpack from EzyDVD.
Freakin' Party Pack	October 30, 2007	November 19, 2007	November 29, 2007	1–5A	15	15	MA15+
This 18-disc collector's set includes Volumes 1–5, Stewie Griffin: The Untold Story, along with a deck of playing cards, 100 poker chips, and a ping pong net, with four balls and two Family Guy-themed paddles. The region 1 set includes Off the Cutting Room Floor, while the region 2/4 sets include Family Guy Uncovered.
Complete Seasons 1–6	n/a	March 3, 2008	n/a	1–5A	15	15	n/a
This box set contains the Season 1–6 sets plus Family Guy Uncovered.
Freakin' Sweet Party Pack	October 21, 2008	n/a	n/a	1–6A	N/A	N/A	n/a
This 22-disc collector's set includes Volume 1–6, Stewie Griffin: The Untold Story, Off the Cutting Room Floor, and Blue Harvest, along with a deck of playing cards, 100 poker chips, and a ping pong net, with four balls and two Family Guy-themed paddles.
The Total World Domination Collection	October 21, 2008	n/a	December 10, 2008	1–6A	N/A	N/A	MA15+
An alternate set to the Freakin' Sweet Party Pack, it includes all the same content contained within a collectable Stewie head, excluding the poker and ping pong sets. In the US it was released exclusively to Amazon.com.
Complete Seasons 1–7	n/a	November 10, 2008	n/a	1–6A	15	15	n/a
This box set contains the Season 1–7 sets plus Family Guy Uncovered.
The Complete Seasons 1–8	n/a	November 2, 2009	n/a	1–7A	15	15	n/a
This box set contains the Season 1–8 sets plus Family Guy Uncovered.
The Complete Seasons 1–9	n/a	November 1, 2010	August 17, 2010	1–8A	15	15	MA15+
This box set contains the Seasons 1–9 sets plus Family Guy Uncovered.
The Vault: Complete Seasons 1–10	n/a	n/a	August 3, 2011	1–9A	N/A	N/A	MA15+
Australia-exclusive box set modeled after the "Brian & Stewie" episode, containing Seasons 1–10 housed in a vault-style box with drawers as well as 20 exclusive collector cards.
The Complete Seasons 1–11	n/a	November 7, 2011	February 29, 2012	1–9B	15	18	MA15+
A Regions 2 and 4 exclusive set containing Seasons 1–11 plus Family Guy Uncovered over 31 discs. This is an 18 certificate in Ireland due to season ten also being an 18

also complete seasons 1-12 (34 discs), 1-14 (40 discs) & 1-16 (46 discs)

== Home media ==
Season	Episodes	DVD volume/season/special (Region 1)	DVD season/special (Region 2/4)	DVD release date			
Season	Episodes	DVD volume/season/special (Region 1)	DVD season/special (Region 2/4)	Region 1	Region 2	Region 4	Discs
1	7	1	1	April 15, 2003	November 12, 2001	October 20, 2003	4
2	21	1	2	April 15, 2003	January 27, 2003	August 2, 2004	4
3	22	2	3	September 9, 2003	July 21, 2003	May 2, 2005	3
4	30	3	4	November 29, 2005	April 24, 2006	May 29, 2006	3
4	30	4	5	November 14, 2006	October 30, 2006	November 1, 2006	3
4	30	Stewie Griffin: The Untold Story	Stewie Griffin: The Untold Story	September 27, 2005	October 24, 2005	January 25, 2006	1
5	18	5	6	September 18, 2007	October 15, 2007	October 17, 2007	3
6	12	6	7	October 21, 2008	November 10, 2008	December 10, 2008	3
6	12	"Blue Harvest"^{3} ^{4}	"Blue Harvest"^{3} ^{4}	January 15, 2008	January 21, 2008	February 5, 2008	1
7	16	7	8	June 16, 2009	November 2, 2009	September 29, 2009	3
8	21	8	9	June 15, 2010	November 1, 2010	August 17, 2010	3
8	21	"Something, Something, Something, Dark Side"^{1} ^{4}	"Something, Something, Something, Dark Side"^{1} ^{4}	December 22, 2009	December 26, 2009	December 23, 2009	1
9	18	9	10	December 13, 2011	May 9, 2011	June 15, 2011	3
9	18	10	11	September 25, 2012	November 7, 2011	February 29, 2012	3
9	18	"It's a Trap!"^{2} ^{4}	"It's a Trap!"^{2} ^{4}	December 21, 2010	December 27, 2010	December 22, 2010	1
10	23	11	12	September 24, 2013	November 4, 2013	October 9, 2013	3
11	22	12	13	December 17, 2013	June 9, 2014	May 14, 2014	3
12	21	12 (Note: From Season 12 onwards, Region 1 releases were listed as seasons.)	14	December 9, 2014	November 10, 2014	December 10, 2014	3
13	18	13	15	December 8, 2015	November 16, 2015	December 2, 2015	3
14	20	14	16	December 6, 2016	November 7, 2016	November 30, 2016	3
15	20	15	17	November 7, 2017	November 6, 2017	November 8, 2017	3
16	20	16	18	December 4, 2018	November 5, 2018	November 21, 2018	3
17	20	17	19	December 10, 2019	December 9, 2019	December 11, 2019	3
