= Jack Perkins (reporter) =

American journalist (1933-2019)

- Born: Jack Morton Perkins; December 28, 1933; Cleveland, Ohio, U.S.
- Died: August 19, 2019 (aged 85); Nokomis, Florida, U.S.
- Education: Case Western Reserve University
- Occupations: Reporter; commentator; correspondent; anchorman
- Known for: Host of Biography
- Spouse: Mary Jo Perkins (m. 1960)
- Children: 3

Jack Morton Perkins (December 28, 1933 – August 19, 2019) was an American reporter, commentator, war correspondent, and anchorman. He was dubbed "America's most literate correspondent" by the Associated Press.

== Early life and education ==
Perkins was born on December 28, 1933, in Cleveland, Ohio. He received a Bachelor of Arts degree in political science from Case Western Reserve University in 1956. While at Case Western Reserve, Perkins joined the Fraternity of Phi Gamma Delta.

== Career ==
Perkins appeared on NBC Nightly News and The Today Show, and on A&E as host of Biography. Until 2012, he hosted A Gulf Coast Journal, a weekly magazine show which aired on Tampa, Florida PBS member station WEDU-TV. He also hosted and narrated special programs on Chattanooga, Tennessee PBS member station WTCI-TV. From 1982 to 1986, Perkins was also a news anchor and commentator for NBC owned-and-operated station KNBC, in Los Angeles.

Perkins devoted a great deal of his time to creating original photography and poetry which he brought together in books, titles including Island Prayers: Photographs and Poems of Praise (2006) and Nature of God: Exploring Nature to meet the Creator.

His 2013 book Finding Moosewood, Finding God tells of the period in his life between 1984 and 1999 that he and his wife, Mary Jo, lived on Bar Island off Acadia National Park in Maine to live a simple life, and there found God.

== Parodies ==
- Perkins and his Biography introductions were parodied several times on Mystery Science Theater 3000, with Perkins portrayed by Michael J. Nelson as a somewhat scatter-brained man prone to long, meandering, name-dropping rambles about nothing in particular, and, on syndicated versions of MST3K, dubbed The Mystery Science Theater Hour, the character introduced the films. Perkins declared himself a fan of the show and his parody on it, even participating in an online drive to save the program during its first cancellation.
- He was also spoofed on Saturday Night Live, first by Harry Shearer reporting on the Walter Keane art exhibit in 1980; and then by Darrell Hammond, who played Perkins as a sarcastic alcoholic while hosting Biography. However, Perkins felt this portrayal of his character was grossly distorted and inaccurate.
- Perkins also voiced a fictional version of himself on the animated series Family Guy in the season 2 episode "Da Boom".

== Personal life and death ==
Perkins married Mary Jo Perkins in 1960. Together they had three children: Julie, Mark and Eric. Eric followed his father into journalism, serving as sports director at KARE-TV, the NBC affiliate station in the twin cities in Minnesota.

Perkins died August 19, 2019, in Nokomis, Florida, at age 85.
