= Holy Crap =

- Family Guy episode
- Episode no.: Season 2 Episode 2
- Directed by: Neil Affleck
- Written by: Chris Sheridan
- Production code: 1ACX08
- Original air date: September 30, 1999

Episode chronology
← Previous "Peter, Peter, Caviar Eater"	Next → "Da Boom"
- Family Guy season 2

"Holy Crap" is the second episode of the second season of the animated comedy television series Family Guy. It was first aired in the United States on Fox on September 30, 1999. The episode revolves around Peter Griffin's newly retired father, Francis after his retirement from his job at a sawmill. He then takes over as manager of Peter's workplace, the Happy-Go-Lucky Toy Factory, and fires his son. In an attempt to reconcile with his father, Peter then kidnaps Pope John Paul II, who gives Francis a job as his bodyguard.

The episode was written by Chris Cheridan and directed by Neil Affleck. L. Brent Bozell III criticized the episode, claiming it promoted anti-Catholicism.

== Production ==
Neil Affleck's second episode he had written for the show, after alwo writing the season one episode "The Son Also Draws".

== Reception ==
The episode received 5.4 million US viewers.

The episode was rated 7.9/10 by Ahsan Haque of IGN, who praised the episode's comedy rather than its plot. Haque described the Pope's kidnapping as "extreme and far fetched, even by Family Guy standards".
