= I Am Peter, Hear Me Roar =

- Family Guy episode
- Episode no.: Season 2 Episode 8
- Directed by: Monte Young
- Written by: Chris Sheridan
- Production code: 2ACX02
- Original air date: March 28, 2000

Guest appearances
- Candice Bergen as Gloria Ironbachs; Faith Ford as Sarah Bennett

Episode chronology
← Previous "The King Is Dead"	Next → "If I'm Dyin', I'm Lyin'"
- Family Guy season 2

"I Am Peter, Hear Me Roar" is the eighth episode of the second season of the American animated series Family Guy, and the 15th episode overall. Written by Chris Sheridan and directed by Monte Young, the episode originally aired on Fox in the United States on March 28, 2000. Candice Bergen and Faith Ford guest starred as Gloria Ironbachs and Sarah Bennett, respectively.

The episode is included in the Freakin' Sweet Collection. The fact that this episode was first broadcast on the same day as the previous episode "The King Is Dead" caused series creator Seth MacFarlane to become concerned the show was soon to be canceled.

== Plot ==
Peter and the neighbors are notified by mail that they will receive free boats if they attend a timeshare sales pitch. However, during a high-pressure sales interview, Peter trades the boat for a mystery box, which turns out to contain tickets for a comedy club. At the club, Peter becomes drunk and attempts to tell jokes on stage. Before his brief performance, during which he mostly abuses the audience, he puts his beer bottle without the lid on in his pocket, which spills down his trousers, making it look like he wet himself. The audience, amused with Peter's mishap, laughs hysterically, making a drunk Peter believe they liked his jokes. This leads Peter to believe he could be a hit as a comic.

Continuing his hubris, Peter tells a sexist joke at his job at the Happy-Go-Lucky Toy Factory that several male co-workers finds hilarious. When female co-worker Sarah Bennett comes and asks to hear the joke, she is greatly offended and then sues Peter and the factory for sexual harassment, meaning Peter faces a prison sentence and the company will be shut down. Her lawyer, Gloria Ironbachs, offers to drop the charges and commute the prison time to a fine if Peter goes to a sensitivity-training program. But after he commits another violent offense by squeezing Gloria's breast, which proves that the program has no effect, he is sentenced to a women's retreat and 10 years probation, where he continues to make insensitive comments until he endures pain comparable to childbirth: taking his bottom lip and stretching it behind his head.

By the time Peter returns home from the women's retreat, he is seen by the family to be very effeminate. At first, Lois appreciates Peter's newfound sensitivity, but she is soon tired of him spending more time in front of the mirror, taking pregnancy tests and scolding Lois for slavishly attending to her husband, who unbeknownst to Peter is himself. She appeals to Peter's friends for help, even going to Glenn Quagmire's house to confess that the "new" Peter is not meeting her needs. The other guys try to bring Peter back to normal by bringing him among his "fellow men". Cleveland takes Peter to a convention of Black men (a nod to the Million-Man March) where Peter blames the assemblage for all the crime and problems and chides them that they should be ashamed for ruining society; they mistakenly believe that he is racist and then chase him through the streets.

When Peter and Lois attend a women's gala, Gloria insults Lois by saying that her current lifestyle is the reason for Peter's former disrespect and hatred for women. Lois reminds her that she is a woman, that feminism is about choice and that she chooses to be a mother and housewife. When Gloria insinuates that Lois' children must be "screwed up" by her ideals, Lois furiously attacks her and they both get into a clothes-shredding catfight, which turns Peter on. After Lois pins Gloria to the floor, Peter pulls Lois out and rushes her home to have sex. When they finish, Peter seemingly doesn't notice Lois until she speaks, then asks Lois to make him a sandwich, spanking her butt as she goes to the kitchen. Even so, Lois is glad the old Peter is back.

== Reception ==
The episode was viewed by 7.62 million people in the US.

In his 2008 review, Ahsan Haque of IGN, rating the episode an 8.5/10, stated that the episode is "cleverly written" and features "a couple of the best scenes in the entire series". However, he noted that "the over-the-top satire might not hit the right chords with everyone".

== Lawsuit ==
In July 2013, the Human Rights Tribunal of Ontario dismissed a frivolous and vexatious complaint filed under the name "Gloria Ironbox" ("Ironbox" being the wordplay derived from the character Gloria Ironbachs). The complaint was dismissed largely because the tribunal quickly learned that the name was the same of that of a parody feminist character in this episode. The complaint attacked the "heteronormative" and "phallocentric" nature of A&W's "A&W Burger Family" mascots. The complainant sought $50,000 in damages and an order requiring A&W to adopt product names which better represented the "LGBTQ2S" community. One suggested product was the "Pillow Biter", described by Ironbox as "a large and thick dark wiener stuffed firmly between two, white, clenched buns." The Tribunal found the complaint "outrageous", "frivolous and vexatious" and "an abuse of process."
