= Biography (TV program) =

American documentary television series

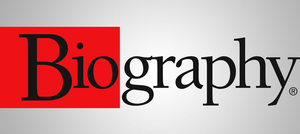
- Genre: Documentary
- Created by: David L. Wolper
- Presented by: Mike Wallace (1961–1963); David Janssen (1979); Peter Graves (1987–1999); Jack Perkins (1994–1999); Harry Smith (1999–2002); Neil Ross (2003–2006)
- Country of origin: United States
- Original language: English

Production
- Running time: 30/60/120 minutes
- Production companies: Wolper Productions (1961–1963, 1979); ABC News Productions

Original release
- Network: Syndication
- Release: February 1962 – 1964
- Release: 1979
- Network: A&E (1987–2006); The Biography Channel/Bio (2006–2012)
- Release: April 6, 1987 – 2012

Related
- Biography This Week; Biography for Kids; Biography International; Biography: American Justice; Biography: WWE Legends

Biography is an American documentary television series and media franchise created in the 1960s by David L. Wolper and owned by A&E Networks since 1987. Each episode depicts the life of a notable person with narration, on-camera interviews, photographs, and stock footage. The show originally ran in syndication in 1962–1964, and in 1979, on A&E from 1987 to 2006, and on The Biography Channel (later Bio, now FYI) from 2006 to 2012. After a five-year hiatus, the franchise was relaunched in 2017. Over the years, the Biography media franchise has expanded domestically and internationally, spinning off several cable television channels, a website, a children's program, a line of books and records, and a series of made-for-TV movies, specials, and miniseries, among other media properties. Biography has won a Peabody Award (1962) and three Emmy Awards (1997, 1999, 2002).

Biography began as an early 1960s syndicated television series produced by David Wolper and narrated by Mike Wallace. It won a Peabody Award, launched Wallace's journalism career, and became a standard in biography films, widely shown in classrooms. After a one-year revival in 1979, the show returned on A&E Networks in 1987. In 1990, A&E began producing new episodes, and expanded the show into a multimedia franchise. By the turn of the century, Biography became A&E's "flagship" program, winning three Emmy Awards, growing from one night per week to seven, and spawning its own cable television channel, several spin-off shows, a website, made-for-TV movies, mini-series, books, audio books, records, and even a board game. The show's ratings eventually slipped and its airtime was reduced to one night per week, then exclusive to The Biography Channel (now FYI). Production of new episodes ceased in 2011 and Biography was almost entirely off the air by 2012. In 2017, A&E relaunched the Biography franchise with a series of TV specials and miniseries. As of 2022, episodes are also shown on Story Television.

== History ==
=== Syndicated series ===
1961 advertisement for Biography in Sponsor magazine

The original Biography was produced by David Wolper and Jack Haley Junior and narrated by Mike Wallace, who at the time was just beginning his award-winning journalism career. The show featured no interviews, consisting instead of a half hour of film clips, newsreel footage, still photographs and recordings.

Production began in 1961 and the show was distributed in syndication by Official Films, premiering in February 1962. The 1960s series profiled world leaders (Winston Churchill), contemporary American politicians (Fiorello H. La Guardia, Joseph McCarthy), athletes (Babe Ruth and Knute Rockne), and other 20th-century notables, including generals, authors, scientists, actors, and all the modern U.S. Presidents.

The program became popular in syndication, and in 1962, won a Peabody Award (Television Education), the first of several for both Wolper and Wallace. Biography has been credited with turning Wallace's journalism career around, and in 1963, he left to join The CBS Morning News with Mike Wallace, and later, 60 Minutes. Biography stopped releasing new episodes in 1964, although some episodes continued to be used as educational films in classrooms, became standards for filmed biographies of the persons profiled, and it played for decades in syndication. The series was briefly revived for syndication in 1979 with host David Janssen, profiling Idi Amin and Walt Disney, among others.

=== 1987 A&E acquisition ===
The Arts & Entertainment Network (now A&E), a joint venture started in 1984 by ABC, NBC, the Hearst Corporation, and the Rockefeller Group, acquired the broadcast rights to Biography and began airing the show on Tuesday nights at 8pm beginning on April 6, 1987, with Peter Graves as host. In the words of one observer, A&E's Biography "picked up where Wolper left off."

In 1990, A&E acquired the rights to the Biography trademark and library, and began producing new episodes of the show, which expanded the subjects from historical figures to contemporary figures, including political leaders and popular celebrities, and which changed the program from one that reported history to one that recorded it as it unfolded. A&E also added on-camera interviews to the Biography format.

In 1994, A&E expanded the show from one night per week to five (every weeknight at 8pm) and commissioned over 100 hours of new programming. Journalist Jack Perkins joined the show as an alternate host along with Graves. For the 1995–96 season, A&E expanded Biography again, adding a sixth night, Biography This Week, which profiled someone from the previous weeks' news, such as Yitzak Rabin, George Burns, Jackie Robinson, Andrew Cunanan and Gene Kelly.

=== Franchise expansion ===
Biography (media franchise)
- Created by: David L. Wolper
- Original work: TV series
- Owner: A&E Networks

Print publications
- Book: Crown Publishing Group/Random House-published line
- Magazine: Biography magazine

Films and television
- Television series: Biography; Biography This Week; Biography for Kids; Biography International; Biography: American Justice
- Television films: Biography Movies series; Johnny Cash's America; The Notorious Life of Biggie Smalls; Gotti & Son; David Koresh and the Siege of Waco; The End of America: Putin's Master Plan; Elizabeth Smart: Autobiography; Who Killed Tupac?; Mike Tyson: Autobiography; Warren Jeffs: Prophet of Evil

Games
- Traditional: "Who Am I? The Biography Game" (board game)

Audio
- Original music: EMI-Capitol Entertainment Properties-published line

Miscellaneous
- Cable channels: The Biography Channel (1998–2006); Bio (channel) (2006–14); The Biography Channel (UK and Ireland); Bio (Australian); The Biography Channel (Canada)

In the mid-1990s, A&E expanded Biography into a media franchise, including multiple cable channels, a website, a monthly magazine, home videos, books for adults and children, audiobooks, music CDs, CD-ROMs, several spin-off shows, mini-series, and made-for-TV movies, and even a board game called "Who Am I? The Biography Game."

In January 1995, A&E launched The History Channel, followed in November by The History Channel U.K., which included a British version of Biography with a British host. By 1996, its tenth year on A&E, Biography had achieved its highest ratings yet, drawing over 1.5 million viewers, six nights per week, and received its first Emmy nominations (The Presidents Award and Outstanding Informational Series). A&E started producing approximately 130 hours of new programming each year, and expanded the franchise into other media. Barnes & Noble began selling Biography videos in its 400 stores. In the summer of 1996, A&E launched Biography.com. In the fall, a Saturday-morning children's version, Biography for Kids, was released.

The next year, Biography won its first Emmy Award (Outstanding Informational Series), and was nominated in two other categories. The same year, Biography was allowed to interview sitting First Lady Hillary Clinton for an episode profiling billionaire Wal-Mart founder Sam Walton. Also in 1997, A&E released Biography audio tapes, and replaced its eight-year-old A&E Monthly magazine with Biography magazine. Circulation started at 100,000 in 1997 and grew for several years (to 270,000 by early 1998; 367,000 by mid-1998; 528,000 by 1999; and 700,000 by 2001). Crown Publishing Group, a subsidiary of Random House, began publishing a line of 200-page Biography paperbacks in 1997, beginning with books on Muhammad Ali, Jacqueline Kennedy Onassis, Ronald Reagan, and Pope John Paul II.

In 1998, Biography was airing twice a day, six days a week. The episode profiling Ozzie and Harriet Nelson, aired on three separate time slots on Sunday, June 21, 1998, became the show's highest-rated episode up to that point. A&E released Biography Movies, featuring subjects such as P.T. Barnum, Lillian Hellman, and Dashiell Hammett. Bill Kurtis hosted a spin-off show, Biography: American Justice, and a series of Biography record albums by artists who had been profiled on the show, including Dean Martin, Judy Garland, Nat King Cole, Mel Torme, and Lena Horne, was released by EMI-Capitol Entertainment Properties. In November, A&E created a spin-off network called The Biography Channel (now Bio Channel/FYI) featuring historical figures and current political and social leaders.

The Biography Channel logo

By 1999, Biography had profiled 600 people. It won its second Emmy Award (Outstanding Sound Mixing For Nonfiction Programming), and was on television in some incarnation seven nights per week, including an "international-figure-personality-of-the-week," Biography International. That year's episode profiling Ron Howard was viewed in 3.5 million homes, becoming a new Biography record. Journalist Harry Smith (previously with CBS's This Morning) joined Biography as the primary host, though Peter Graves and Jack Perkins continued to appear on the show.

By the end of the century, Biography had profiled over 800 people, and on October 1, 2000, A&E Networks expanded its British partnership with Sky UK with the launch of a UK market Biography Channel. Biography's ratings declined 15% from 2000 to 2001, and another 17% from 2001 to 2002, before increasing 6% in 2003. Despite the decrease in ratings, by 2002, Biography won its third Emmy Award (Outstanding Documentary or Nonfiction Series), and marked its 1,000th profile. A&E responded to the ratings decline by changing Biography's management personnel and launching a marketing campaign centering on photographs taken by photographer Annie Leibovitz of well-known subjects that had been profiled on Biography, including Jerry Seinfeld, Muhammad Ali, Steven Spielberg and Harrison Ford.

"We produced a show on the Green River Valley killer in a week," O'Hearn says. When Katharine Hepburn, John Ritter and Gregory Peck died, up-to-date shows about their lives were televised if not on the night they passed away, the following night.

— Variety, quoting Biography Vice President Didi O'Hearn, 2002

In 2002, host Harry Smith left to join CBS's The Early Show. A&E began reducing the number of nights Biography aired starting 2003, when Neil Ross became the show's final host, narrating episodes on Elizabeth Taylor and Elvis Presley. The growth of Biography's magazine circulation slowed in 2002 and declined 9% in 2003. In 2004, A&E scaled back Biography magazine from monthly to quarterly publication.

By 2006, Ross had left the show and Biography was airing only once a week, usually on Friday nights with three back-to-back episodes. A&E removed Biography from its lineup in August, making new episodes of the show exclusively available on The Biography Channel. Its first year on The Biography Channel featured 64 hours of new programming, including episodes on the Onassis family, Jamie Oliver, Russell Simmons, George Lopez, Anthony Hopkins, Grace Slick, Elmore Leonard and Olivia Newton-John. The following year, The Biography Channel was rebranded "Bio." In 2008, Biography released a documentary, Johnny Cash's America, together with a companion DVD/CD package published by Legacy Recordings containing an unreleased recitation by the singer entitled "I Am the Nation".

Rebranded "Bio" logo

The last new episode aired in 2011, and the show ended its run in 2012. In 2014, A&E replaced its underperforming Bio channel with The FYI Network and partnered with digital publisher SAY Media. SAY Media began operating Biography.com, while A&E continued producing short-form videos for the website.

=== 2017 revival ===
In 2017, A&E Networks relaunched the franchise with a set of two-hour specials and mini-series for three of its channels, A&E, History and Lifetime. Biography returned to A&E on June 28, 2017, with The Notorious Life of Biggie Smalls. A&E announced that it would produce up to 40 hours of new episodes as part of the relaunch, including features on John Gotti, Tupac Shakur, Vladimir Putin, Elizabeth Smart, Mike Tyson, and David Koresh.

== Biography.com ==
In 1996, Biography launched a website called Biography.com with over 3,000 biographies of well-known people, based in Easton, Pennsylvania. Since 2023, Biography.com has been part of Hearst Magazines. Bill Strickland is the current editorial director, and Andrew Daniels is the news director.

== Hosts ==
Hosts of Biography, 1961–2006
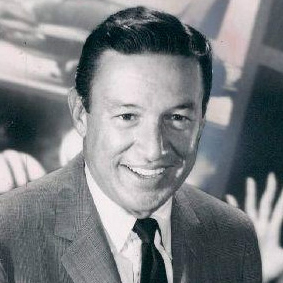
1961–1963: Mike Wallace

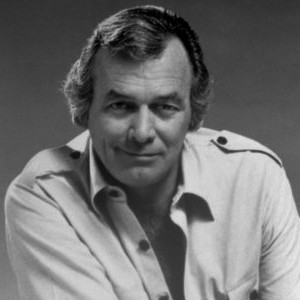
1979: David Janssen

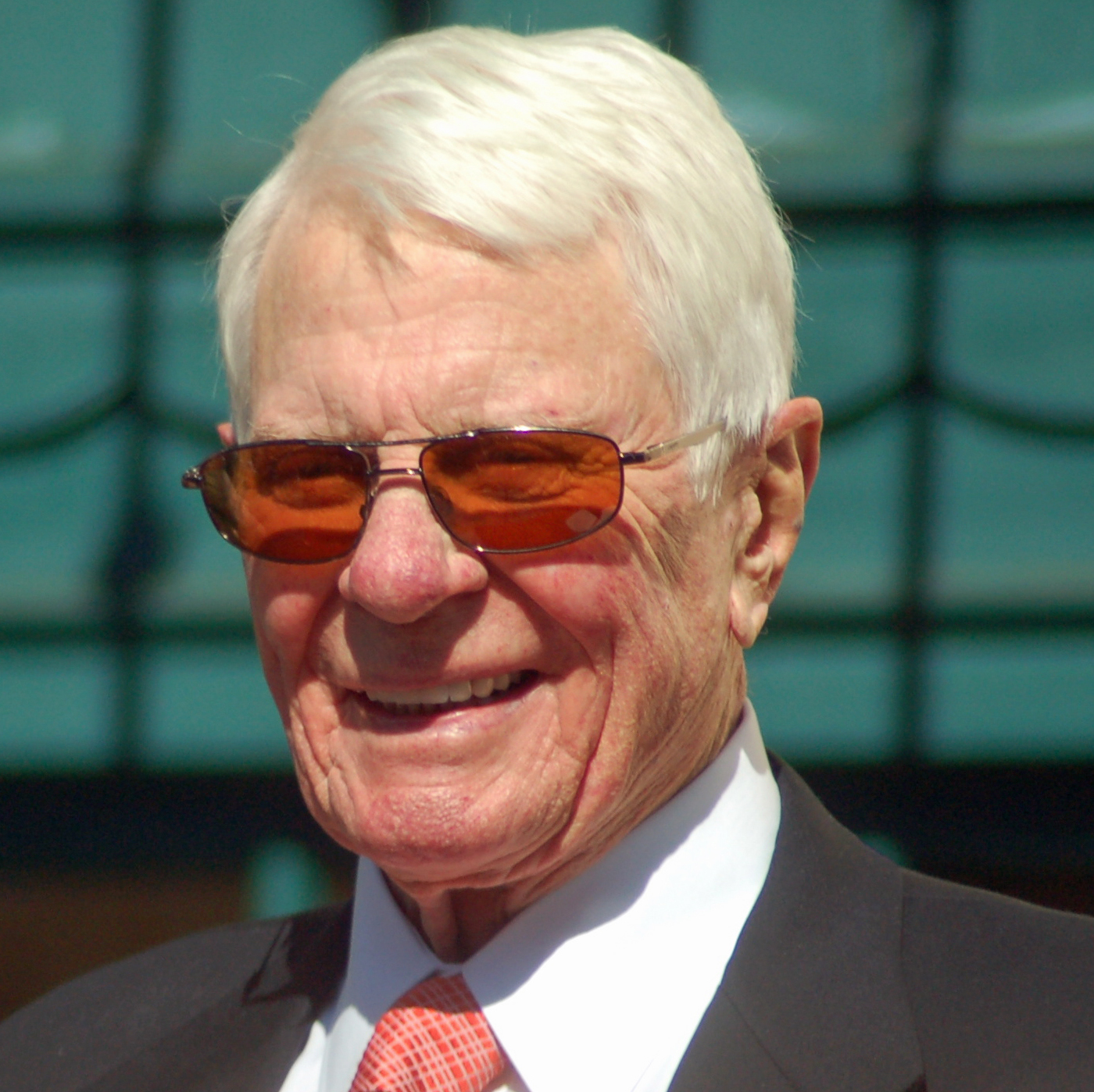
1987–1999: Peter Graves

1994–1999: Jack Perkins

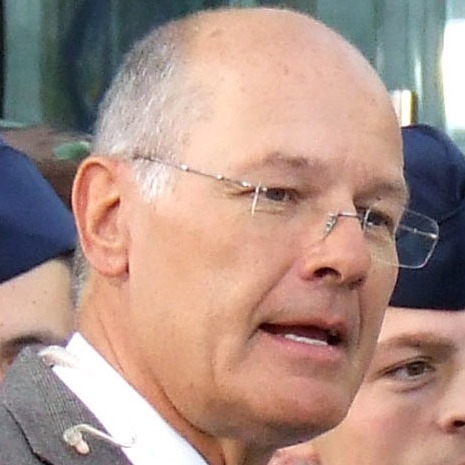
1999–2002: Harry Smith

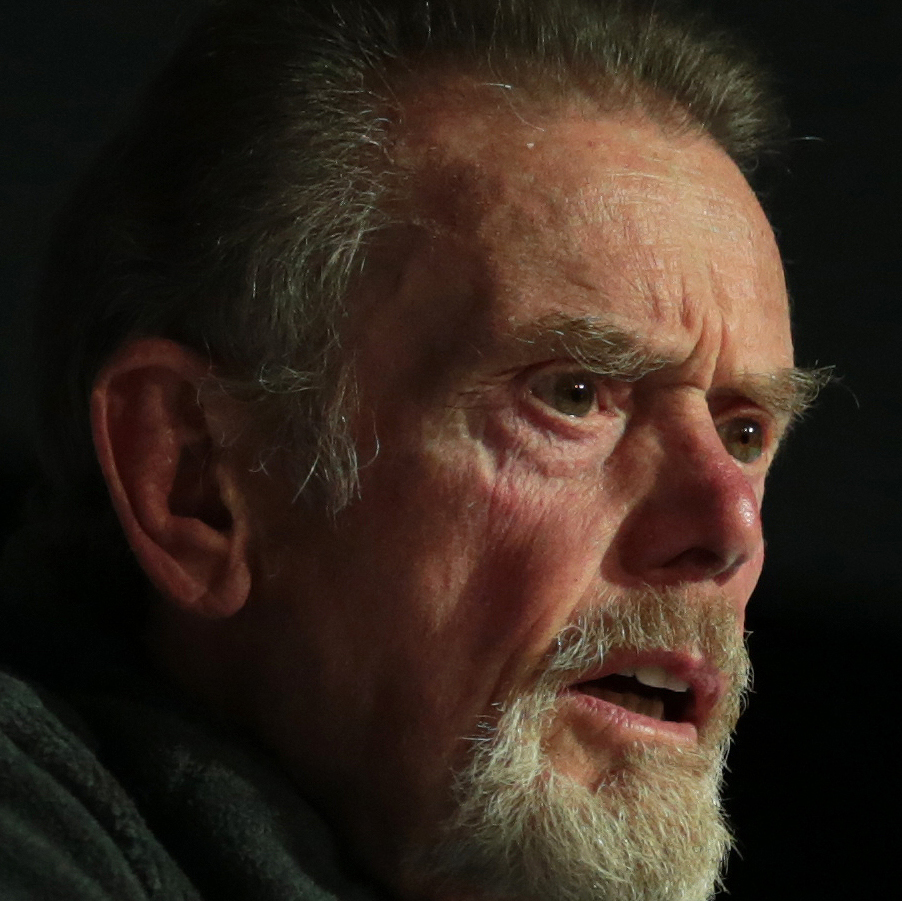
2003–2006: Neil Ross

The original, early 1960s syndicated Biography was narrated by Mike Wallace, who won his first Peabody Award on the show, and launched his journalism career. Wallace left in 1963 to join The CBS Morning News with Mike Wallace, and later, 60 Minutes.

Actor David Janssen hosted a short-lived 1979 revival of the show on CBS. Actor Peter Graves hosted Biography on A&E starting in 1987, and he was joined in 1994 by journalist Jack Perkins as an alternate host, when the show expanded from one night per week to five.

Where else could you find maybe on three successive nights the stories of Robert E. Lee, Gypsy Rose Lee and Bruce Lee?

— Host Harry Smith, as quoted by The Hartford Courant, 2002

In 1999, after reportedly trying without success to recruit Charlie Gibson (who was then leaving ABC's Good Morning America) to replace Graves and Perkins, A&E named journalist Harry Smith, previously with CBS's This Morning, as the primary host of Biography, although Graves and Perkins continued to have a role with the series. Smith left in 2002 to join CBS's The Early Show, and was replaced by Neil Ross. Ross left in 2006, and A&E produced Biography as an unhosted show.

== Subjects profiled ==
Biography has profiled over 1,000 subjects, ranging from "Moses to Mozart to Madonna", in the words of host Harry Smith, and as of 2018, Biography.com claims to contain over 7,000 biographical profiles on its website. The most-watched episodes profiled Ron Howard, the Gambino crime family, Ozzie and Harriet Nelson, Andre the Giant, and Sam Walton. Since its first broadcast in 1962, some of the people Biography has profiled include:

- Actors: Judy Garland, Betty Grable, Sophia Loren, Edward G. Robinson, Elizabeth Taylor, Pierce Brosnan, Michael Douglas, Kathie Lee Gifford, Tom Hanks, Paul Newman, Nick Nolte, Jane Fonda, Anthony Perkins
- Artists: Leonardo da Vinci, Peter Carl Faberge, Andy Warhol
- Authors: Ernest Hemingway
- Athletes: Muhammad Ali, Jackie Robinson
- Businesspeople: J.C. Penney, the Woolworth family, Barbara Hutton
- Comedians: Ernie Kovacs, Jonathan Winters
- Fictional characters: Betty Boop, Lamb Chop, Catwoman
- Filmmakers: Howard Hughes, George Lucas, Steven Spielberg
- Historical figures: Attila the Hun, Alexander the Great, Columbus Chiang Kai-shek, Rosa Parks, Oskar Schindler, Nostradamus
- Lawyers: Ken Starr
- Magicians: Harry Houdini
- Martial artists: Bruce Lee
- Musicians: Bob Dylan, Elvis Presley, Jimi Hendrix, Janis Joplin, Marvin Gaye, Dolly Parton, Nat King Cole, Lena Horne, Dean Martin
- Political leaders: Che Guevara, Vladimir Lenin Winston Churchill Bill Clinton, Charles de Gaulle, Al Gore, John McCain, Nancy Reagan
- Professional wrestlers: Andre the Giant, The Rock
- Religious figures: Jesus Christ, Gandhi,
- Royalty: Prince Andrew, Princess Diana
- Scientists: Carl Sagan, Howard Carter
- Serial killers: Jeffrey Dahmer, The Boston Strangler

== Reception ==
Mike Wallace (left) presented with a Peabody Award for Biography in 1962

Biography has been described as "an undisputed phenom", "one of cable television's most respected programs", "one of the most popular series on cable TV", "the belle of the Nielsen ball", and "the most pervasive series of history films found in classroom libraries". It has been called A&E's "flagship series", "signature series", "strongest brand", and "most-watched show". In 2002, a writer for The Hartford Courant asked, "Is there anybody who doesn't like, or at the very least hasn't stopped to watch, A&E's Biography?"

Biography has won a Peabody Award and three Academy of Television Arts & Sciences Awards (Emmy) Awards: Outstanding Informational Series in 1997, Outstanding Sound Mixing For Nonfiction Programming in 1999, and Outstanding Informational Series in 2002. The show has been nominated for 16 other Emmy Awards: The Presidents Award (1996–1997), Outstanding Informational Series (1996), Outstanding Individual Achievement Informational Programming (1997), Outstanding Documentary Or Nonfiction Series (1998–2000, 2003–09, 2011), Outstanding Picture Editing For Nonfiction Programming (1999), and Outstanding Informational Series (2001).

Not all reviews have been positive. The same Hartford Courant writer criticized the early 1960s version of the show for focusing on "great men". A writer for The New York Times described Biography as "skipping easily, and often superficially" from one subject to the next. Variety has reviewed some episodes as "disappointingly routine...marred by errors and omissions," and "suffer[ing] tunnel vision." An episode on Fidel Castro was criticized as having "a distinct anti-Castro edge by Mike Wallace." The Dwight Eisenhower Presidential Library includes a copy of a 1962 Biography episode featuring Eisenhower with the notation, "There are some simplifications of facts and condensation of events." A 2018 Salt Lake Tribune TV critic wrote "the producers of Warren Jeffs: Prophet of Evil should have been more careful" to avoid confusing the LDS Church with the FLDS Church "through careless editing."

BIOGRAPHY: DWIGHT D. EISENHOWER 1962...39th edition of CBS biography series. Follows Eisenhower from birth to 1962. There are some simplifications of facts and condensation of events. Does contain unique WWII film footage. Narrated by Mike Wallace.

— Dwight D. Eisenhower Presidential Library Archives entry for 1962 Biography episode

In 2002, the American Library Association wrote that Biography.com is an "extensive site" and "the perfect source for anyone looking for background or historical and biographical information." In 2009, Biography.com was named a "Ten Best Reference Website" by The Sunday Times. Biography.com has been cited as a source by The New York Times, The Washington Post, The Los Angeles Times, The Chicago Tribune, The Columbus Dispatch, The Boston Globe, and NPR.

== In popular culture ==
Biography has been a category on the television game show Jeopardy!. In 2000, the NBC sitcom Just Shoot Me! did an episode called "A&E Biography: Nina Van Horn". The episode was shot in the style of A&E's Biography and focused on the life of one of the show's main characters, Nina Van Horn. The episode featured interviews with the other characters of the show and multiple special guest stars, including Don Henley, Jerry Hall, Sydney Pollack, Pat Sajak, Vanna White, and Buddy Hackett. The episode also included an introduction, conclusion, and voiceover provided by then-host Harry Smith.

== See also ==
- Behind the Music
- E! True Hollywood Story
