= Peter, Peter, Caviar Eater =

- Family Guy episode
- Episode no.: Season 2 Episode 1
- Directed by: Jeff Myers
- Written by: Chris Sheridan
- Production code: 1ACX08
- Original air date: September 23, 1999

Guest appearances
- Fairuza Balk as Connie D'Amico; Gregory Jbara as Jonathan; Robin Leach as himself

Episode chronology
| ← Previous "Brian: Portrait of a Dog" | Next → "Holy Crap" |
- Family Guy season 2

"Peter, Peter, Caviar Eater" is the first episode of the second season of the animated comedy television series Family Guy and the eighth episode overall. It originally aired on the Fox network in the United States on September 23, 1999. The episode was written by Chris Sheridan and directed by Jeff Myers.

== Plot ==
Lois' wealthy aunt, Marguerite Pewterschmidt, arrives at the Griffin home for a visit but dies on their doorstep. A videotaped will, narrated in the style of Lifestyles of the Rich and Famous by Robin Leach, reveals that Lois has inherited Cherrywood Manor, a large estate in Newport, Rhode Island. The Griffin family moves in, and the manor's staff welcomes them with a musical number, "This House Is Freakin' Sweet", a parody of "I Think I'm Gonna Like It Here" from the musical Annie. The staff then prepare to leave, revealing Marguerite only paid them up through the song. Peter hires them all back after revealing he sold the family's house in Quahog without telling Lois.

Peter struggles to fit in with Newport's upper-class social circle and asks Brian to teach him to behave like a gentleman, who resorts to shock therapy while having Peter watch episodes of Frasier. At a high-society auction, Peter, convinced of his new wealth, bids $100 million for a decorative vase. Faced with the enormous debt, Peter attempts to have Cherrywood Manor declared a historical landmark through a series of fabricated claims. He eventually discovers hidden photographs revealing the manor was once used as a brothel by several prominent historical figures, including Abraham Lincoln, Ulysses S. Grant, and Robert E. Lee. The discovery makes the property highly valuable; Peter sells one of the photographs to a tabloid and uses the proceeds to repurchase the family's original house in Quahog.

== Production ==
The episode title is a reference to the nursery rhyme "Peter Peter Pumpkin Eater". According to the episode's commentary, the writing staff originally intended to directly parody the Annie song "I Think I'm Gonna Like It Here" for the welcoming musical number, but writer David Zuckerman suggested producing a soundalike version instead, noting it could make the episode eligible for an Emmy nomination.

== Cultural references ==
The video will left by Aunt Marguerite is presented in the style of Lifestyles of the Rich and Famous, with narration by Robin Leach, who guest starred as himself. Brian's efforts to teach Peter etiquette; having him watch Frasier while undergoing shock therapy, parody the plot of My Fair Lady. While exploring the mansion, Stewie encounters a pair of twins who invite him to play with them forever, a reference to The Shining. The episode also features a Star Wars reference when Brian compares Peter's situation to that of Lando Calrissian to snap him out of his delusion, and a reference to the Star Trek episode "Amok Time" during a scene in which Stewie orders two servants to duel.

== Reception ==
Ahsan Haque of IGN awarded the episode a 9.5 out of 10, calling it "yet another very memorable episode, highlighted by Peter's idiotic creativity and social ineptitudes, and one of the better musical segments of the series." The musical number "This House Is Freakin' Sweet" has been particularly well regarded; Complex ranked it third on their list of the ten best Family Guy musical numbers, describing it as "an early song parody in the show's history." MSN included the episode in their list of the 15 funniest Family Guy episodes, praising its use of sitcom tropes and noting that placing the low-class Griffin family in a high-class setting "proves you don't always have to go off-the-wall with episode ideas."
