= Brian Wallows and Peter's Swallows =

- Family Guy episode
- Episode no.: Season 3 Episode 17
- Directed by: Dan Povenmire
- Written by: Allison Adler
- Production code: 3ACX03
- Original air date: January 17, 2002

Guest appearances
- A. J. Benza; Gary Cole; Adria Firestone as Pearl's opera voice; Melora Hardin as Young Pearl Burton; Butch Hartman as Various; Phil LaMarr as the Judge; Jane Lynch as Patsy Ramsey; Nicole Sullivan as Muriel Goldman; Wally Wingert as Various

Episode chronology
← Previous "A Very Special Family Guy Freakin' Christmas"	Next → "From Method to Madness"
- Family Guy season 3

"Brian Wallows and Peter's Swallows" is the seventeenth episode of Family Guy's third season, and the 45th episode overall. It originally aired on Fox on January 17, 2002. In the episode, Brian is sentenced to community service and must look after a cranky, elderly woman. He at first dislikes her, but after seeing a documentary revealing her remarkable singing ability, they become friends. Meanwhile, Peter decides to grow a beard, which soon becomes the home for a family of endangered birds.

"Brian Wallows and Peter's Swallows" was written by Allison Adler and directed by Dan Povenmire. It featured guest performances from A. J. Benza, Gary Cole, Adria Firestone, Melora Hardin, Butch Hartman, Phil LaMarr, Jane Lynch, Nicole Sullivan and Wally Wingert. The episode received generally positive reviews from critics, and earned an Emmy Award for Outstanding Original Music and Lyrics for the musical number "You've Got a Lot to See".

== Plot ==
Deciding to go on a date with a hot but dumb blonde, Brian soon discovers he is dating "an idiot". Brian returns home depressed, and Lois tells him that he is too picky when it comes to the women he dates. Lois suggests that Brian go with Peter, Quagmire and Cleveland to a laser rock concert, while there, Brian begins looking around the theater at all of the loving couples and becomes even more depressed, eventually deciding to start drinking. On the journey home, he is soon pulled over by Joe and arrested for driving under the influence.

One month later, Brian is sentenced to 100 hours of community service in the "Outreach to the Elderly" program, and assigned to a bitter elderly woman named Pearl Burton, who has not left her home for thirty years. Appearing at her home the next day, he quickly becomes angered by her constant complaining, eventually losing his patience and temper, telling her to "drop dead". Later that day, however, Brian discovers Pearl was actually a brilliant opera singer from the 1940s until the 1960s; who was shamed into hiding once she faced demands to sing her more popular radio jingles. Deciding to visit Pearl later that night, he discovers her about to take her own life; but prevents her from doing so at the last second. Brian manages to convince Pearl that her voice is amazing, and she is touched.

The two quickly bond over Pearl's singing and become close friends. Suggesting they go out for dinner, Brian leads Pearl out of her house, where she is immediately run over by a truck. At the hospital, Pearl is left in a serious condition and Brian feels guilty about taking her outside her house. Spending their last seconds together in virtual reality, which Brian had bought while at the rock concert, Pearl soon dies from her injuries, leaving Brian alone and upset once again.

Meanwhile, after watching an episode of Grizzly Adams on television, Peter decides to grow a beard, despite Lois' disapproval. After his beard is fully grown, the Griffin family decide to go out for dinner, but are soon pestered by a white-rumped swallow, who eventually settles in Peter's facial hair. Unaware that the bird is actually an endangered species, Peter attempts to remove the bird, but is soon threatened with a prison sentence if he does so. Left with no other choice but to let the bird live within his beard, Peter attempts to continue life as normally as possible, until he can no longer take the bird's constant squawking, and decides to shoot the bird. Stopped at the last second by Lois, Peter accidentally shoots a nearby window, causing the bird to fly out. Thankful that the bird is finally gone, the two soon hear peeping coming from inside his facial hair, and discover three small baby birds. Won over by their resemblance to his own children, he decides to keep the baby birds, and take the place of their mother. As time goes on, he becomes reluctant to release the birds once they have become fully grown, but is ultimately convinced by Lois to release them back into the wilderness once they attempt to fly out of their bedroom window. He does release them, and then he finally takes the plunge and shaves off his beard.

Later in the Drunken Clam, Brian and Peter drink to each other's experiences and, as Brian is getting looks from an attractive blonde at the bar and Peter is getting looks from a large female bird, they both agree that they aren't ready to move on.

== Production ==
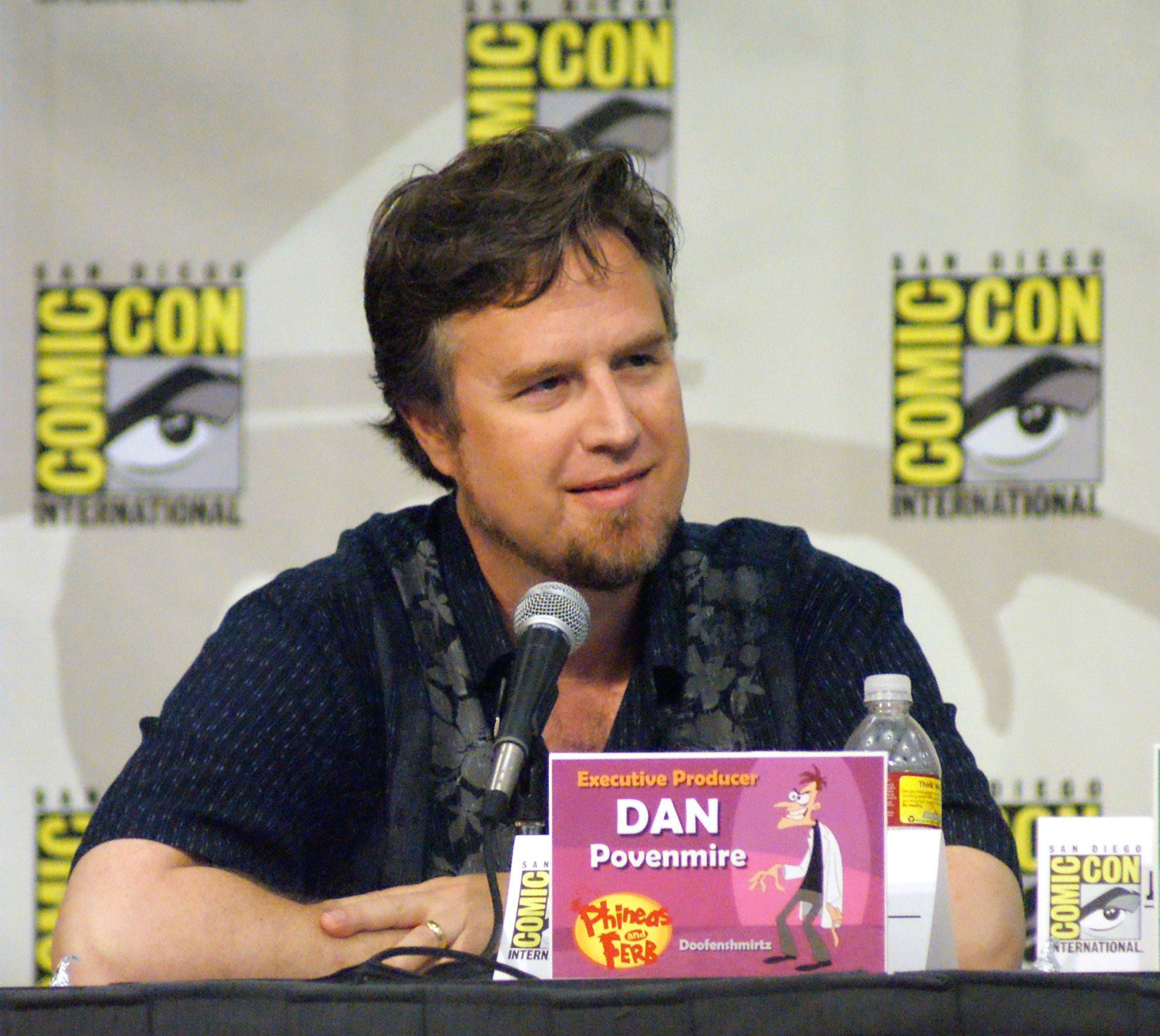
Dan Povenmire directed the episode.

As her first and only episode for the series, the show was written by future Chuck writer Allison Adler, and directed by series regular Dan Povenmire before the conclusion of the third production season.

Initially, the "tearjerker" ending was not planned, and series creator Seth MacFarlane had intended to close the episode with a series of gags, similar to many other episodes. Voice actress and staff writer Alex Borstein, along with Allison Adler, convinced MacFarlane that the episode would be far more effective if it were to end on a down note, eventually calling it the only episode to have "real human emotion".

In addition to the regular cast, gossip columnist and television host A. J. Benza, actor Gary Cole, opera singer Adria Firestone, actress Melora Hardin, writer and animator Butch Hartman, voice actor Phil LaMarr, actress Jane Lynch, actress Nicole Sullivan and voice actor Wally Wingert guest starred in the episode. Recurring guest voice actors Lori Alan and writer Mike Barker also made minor appearances.

== Censorship ==
Following the September 11 attacks in 2001, 20th Century Fox edited the musical number "You've Got a Lot to See" in syndicated airings by digitally removing the World Trade Center towers and replacing the tarot card of George W. Bush holding a beer bong with talk-show host Jerry Springer.

== Reception ==
"Brian Wallows and Peter's Swallows" won an Emmy Award for Best Song. Creator Seth MacFarlane, the recipient of the award, noted that the episode's director, Dan Povenmire, deserved to have received the award for the contribution the visuals made to the episode's win. Povenmire jokingly responded "That's a nice sentiment and all, but did he offer to give me his (Emmy Award)? No! And it's not like he doesn't already have two (Emmy Awards) of his own just sitting in his house!"
