= To Love and Die in Dixie =

- Family Guy episode
- Episode no.: Season 3 Episode 12
- Directed by: Dan Povenmire
- Written by: Steve Callaghan
- Production code: 3ACX09
- Original air date: November 15, 2001

Guest appearances
- Brian Dunkleman as Southerner; Dakota Fanning as Little Girl; Ralph Garman as Jeff Foxworthy / Agent Jenkins; Waylon Jennings as himself; Rachael MacFarlane as Barbara; Kathleen Wilhoite as Sam

Episode chronology
← Previous "Emission Impossible"	Next → "Screwed the Pooch"
- Family Guy season 3

"To Love and Die in Dixie" is the 12th episode of the third season of the animated comedy series Family Guy, and the 41st episode overall. The episode aired on Fox on November 15, 2001. Country music singer Waylon Jennings, who died three months after the episode aired on television in the United States, guest-stars in his last appearance on the show. Dakota Fanning also guest-starred on the episode. The title is a reference to a line in the traditional Southern song "Dixie".

The episode was written by future showrunner Steve Callaghan and directed by Dan Povenmire. It features the first appearance of the recurring character John Herbert, an elderly pedophile with a perpetual lust for Peter and Lois' teenage son Chris Griffin.

== Plot ==
Needing extra money, Chris decides to get a newspaper route to help pay for a birthday gift for a girl he likes. Among those on his paper route is an old man named Herbert who is sexually attracted to Chris. While delivering papers, Chris witnesses a robbery at a convenience store, and his bike is stolen by the burglar. Later, at the police station, Chris identifies the thief from a police lineup. However, Peter shows up and unknowingly tells the thief that he is there to pick up Chris who was going to "finger the guy who held up the convenience store". He proceeds to give the thief a picture of Chris, along with various other personal information. When the thief escapes and swears vengeance on Chris, the family is placed in the Witness Protection Program where they are relocated to Bumblescum, a tiny town in the deep South, about which Meg complains, although Lois remains somewhat optimistic.

Deciding to embrace the South, Peter decorates his car like the General Lee and becomes sheriff with Brian as his deputy, although the two neglect their responsibilities in order to drink. Stewie joins a hillbilly jug band, while Meg becomes the most successful and popular student among her classmates, and Chris makes a new friend named Sam.

Later, when Peter interferes with a Civil War reenactment, claiming the North won the war, despite how they were being portrayed in the play, Sam's dad says Chris and Sam can no longer be friends and Peter and Brian have to answer to the civil war survivors. Not knowing of this, Sam unexpectedly kisses Chris, and Chris assumes Sam is gay. As Chris writes in a journal about what happened with Sam, Brian hears the story (as Chris was speaking out what he wrote), and he explains that kissing Sam seemingly felt right.

When the two meet again, Chris explains to Sam that even though he is flattered that Sam likes him, he is not interested in a romantic relationship and feels that they are probably better off as just friends. Just before the two go swimming, Chris finds out that Sam is a girl, and due to his bad experiences around girls, Chris now feels awkward around Sam. At a party that is held that night, Sam explains to Chris that he had no problem talking to her when he thought she was a guy, so she tells Chris to think of her as a boy who he can make out with.

After the FBI agents who were hired to look over the Griffins home in Quahog accidentally reveal the location of the family to the criminal, he tracks the family down in Bumblescum to kill Chris. During the confrontation, however, the criminal is shot and killed by Sam's father, who tells Peter that despite their differences, as long as the Griffins live in town, they're Southerners as well, and Southerners always look after their own.

With the criminal gone, the Griffins return to Quahog with Chris having to leave Sam behind. Once they are home, they realize that someone had left 113 messages on their answering machine, all of which turn out to be from Herbert, who is looking for Chris.

== Production ==
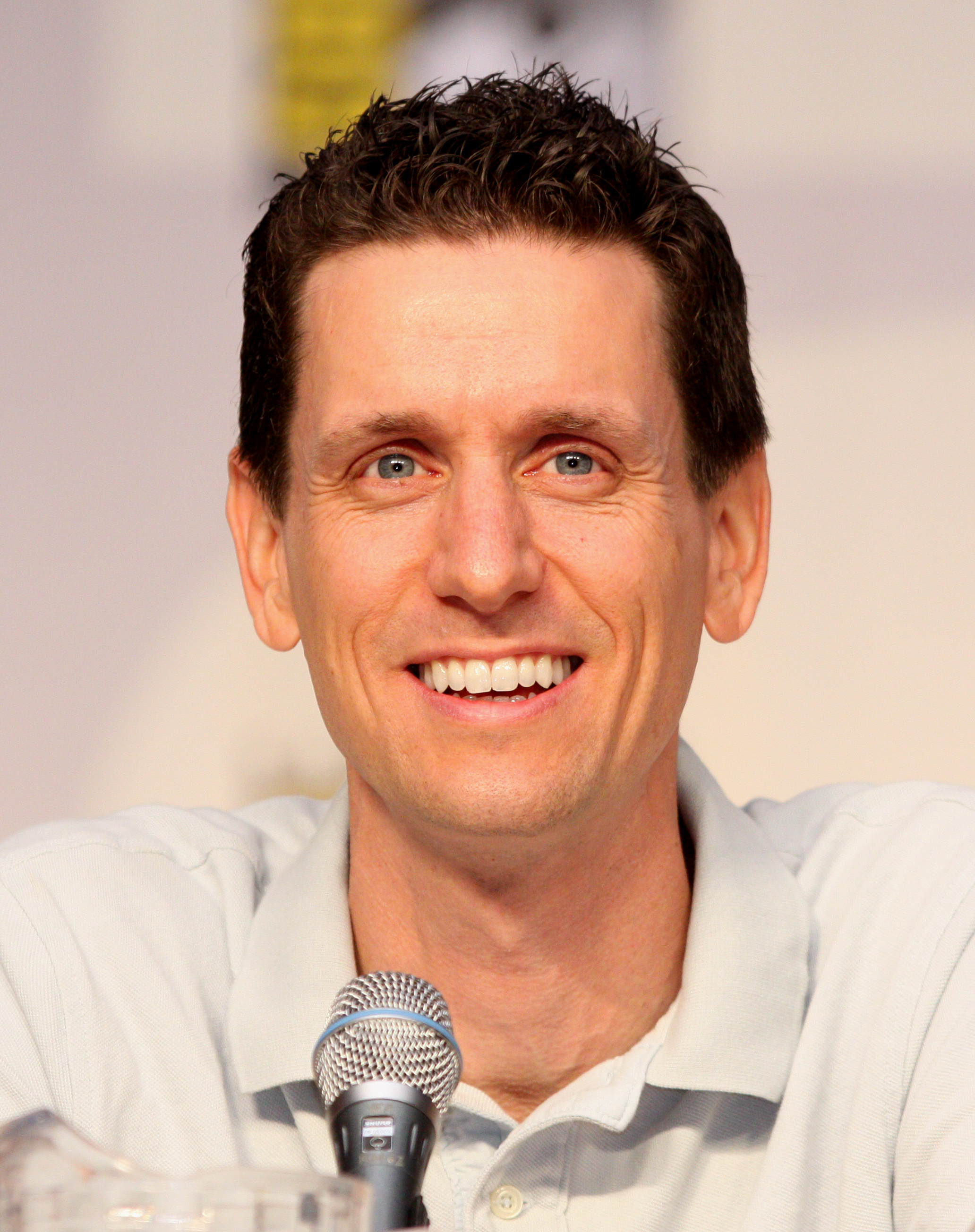
Steve Callaghan wrote the episode.

Dan Povenmire, who directed the episode, was granted substantial creative freedom by series creator and executive producer Seth MacFarlane. Povenmire recalled that MacFarlane would tell him "We've got two minutes to fill. Give me some visual gags. Do whatever you want. I trust you." Povenmire praised this management style for letting him "have fun." Povenmire brought realism, and material from his own experiences, to the visual direction of Family Guy.

For this episode, Povenmire drew inspiration from his own childhood in the deep south for a sequence for a background scene where a "redneck" character nonchalantly kicks a corpse into the nearby river. There is also a running gag in the episode of raccoons jumping out of random objects and scratching Peter in the face.

In addition to the regular cast, actors Brian Dunkleman and Kathleen Wilhoite, voice actors Dakota Fanning, Ralph Garman, and Rachael MacFarlane, and singer Waylon Jennings guest starred in the episode. Recurring guest voice actors and writers Mike Henry and Danny Smith made minor appearances.
