= Chris Sheridan (writer) =

American screenwriter (born 1967)

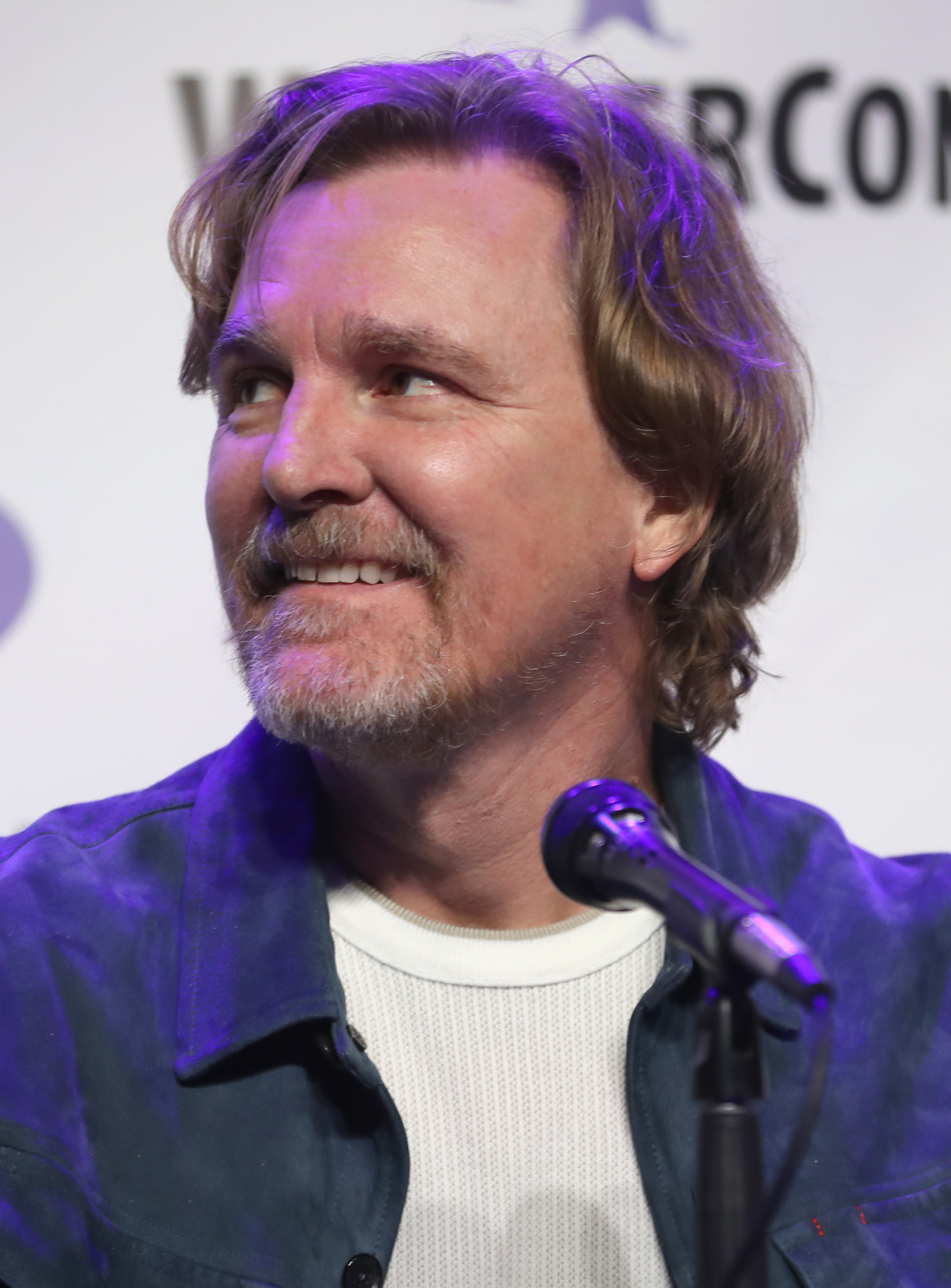
- Sheridan at the 2024 WonderCon
- Born: Christopher Sheridan; September 19, 1967 (age 59); Philippines
- Occupations: Screenwriter, producer, voice actor
- Children: 1
- Writing career
- Period: 1992–present
- Genre: Humor

Christopher Sheridan (born September 19, 1967) is an American television writer, producer, and occasional voice actor. He was the showrunner of the SyFy/USA Network series Resident Alien.

== Early life ==
Christopher Sheridan was born on September 19, 1967, in the Philippines. He grew up in New Hampshire and attended Gilford High School. While there, Sheridan discovered he enjoyed writing, but had not considered a career in it. After graduating from the school in 1985, Sheridan went to Union College, where he majored in English and took every creative writing class available. After he met a person who had written a screenplay, Sheridan decided that he wanted to have a career in screenwriting.

After receiving his college degree in 1989, Sheridan returned to his home. He held various jobs, including substitute teaching, bartending, and working in his father's variety store. Sheridan eventually decided that if he wanted to establish a career, he had to relocate, so he moved to California in 1992. Sheridan stayed at a friend's house, and used a payphone located on Sunset Boulevard to call interested employers.

== Career and later life ==
In 1992, Sheridan was hired as an assistant writer for the sitcom Shaky Ground. During his time on the show, he also worked elsewhere as a freelance writer. Following that show's cancellation in 1993, Sheridan was hired as an assistant on the show Living Single, where he wrote four episodes. Sheridan was promoted to writer, and worked on the show until it was cancelled in 1998. Shortly after, Sheridan received a call from his agent, where he was told that the only show with an open spot was Family Guy, which Sheridan did not want to do, thinking that writing for an animated show would end his career.

After meeting series creator Seth MacFarlane, Sheridan was hired as one of the series' first writers. The first episode he wrote was "I Never Met the Dead Man", the second episode of the first season, which premiered on April 11, 1999. Sheridan also wrote the second season premiere "Peter, Peter, Caviar Eater." He later went on to write the episodes "I Am Peter, Hear Me Roar", "If I'm Dyin', I'm Lyin'", "He's Too Sexy for His Fat", and "Lethal Weapons".

Due to low ratings, the cancellation of Family Guy was announced for the end of its second season, though it was unexpectedly continued. While the show was on hiatus, Sheridan became a writer for the sitcom Titus and also wrote several episodes for the sitcom Yes, Dear. He returned to the show after it was revived for a fourth season, writing "The Fat Guy Strangler". Sheridan would later write the episodes "Peter's Daughter", "Peter-assment" and "Burning Down the Bayit". He penned the Road to... episode "Road to the North Pole" along with Danny Smith, and wrote the episode "Save the Clam". Sheridan continues to write for the show, with his most recent credit being the seventeenth season episode "Dead Dog Walking". Sheridan also infrequently provides voices for several small characters on the show, such as recurring character James William Bottomtooth III. In 2011, Sheridan wrote a television pilot entitled Lovelives for NBC. It was to star Ryan Hansen. Although a pilot was ordered and filmed, it did not continue.

Sheridan has received several nominations for awards for his work on Family Guy. At the 52nd Primetime Emmy Awards, Sheridan was nominated for a Primetime Emmy Award for Outstanding Original Music and Lyrics for writing the song "We Only Live to Kiss Your Ass." He wrote that "it was a strange experience at the Emmys. I laughed out loud when the presenter had to list that song as one of the nominations alongside normal songs written by people like Marvin Hamlisch." Along with the other producers of the series, he was nominated for a Primetime Emmy Award for Outstanding Animated Program in 2005 for "North by North Quahog" at the 57th Primetime Emmy Awards, and again in 2006 for "PTV" at the 58th. Also in 2006, Sheridan won a DVD Exclusive Award for writing the "Stewie B. Goode" segment of the Family Guy direct-to-video film Stewie Griffin: The Untold Story. He shared the award with writer Gary Janetti. 2008 saw Sheridan receive another Outstanding Animated Program nomination, for "Blue Harvest", at the 60th Primetime Emmy Awards. 2008 also saw him receive a nomination for a British Academy Television Award for Best International and in 2009 he was nominated for a Primetime Emmy Award for Outstanding Comedy Series at the 61st Primetime Emmy Awards; both awards were for Family Guy in general.

Sheridan splits his time between Los Angeles and Connecticut, and has a daughter. When asked if being a parent affected his style of humor, Sheridan responded that he found himself "a little less forgiving of pedophile jokes."

He created the show Resident Alien based on the comic of the same name.

== Filmography ==
Year	Work	Role
1992	Shaky Ground	Writer's assistant
1995–97	Living Single	Writer (wrote episodes "The Handyman Can", "Dear John", "The Clown That Roared", and "High Anxiety")
1999–2003; 2005–22	Family Guy	Writer, executive story editor, voice actor, co-producer, executive producer & consulting producer (wrote episodes "I Never Met the Dead Man", "Peter, Peter, Caviar Eater", "I Am Peter, Hear Me Roar", "If I'm Dyin', I'm Lyin'", "He's Too Sexy for His Fat", "Lethal Weapons", "Peter's Daughter", "Peter-assment", "Road to the North Pole", "Burning Down the Bayit", "Save the Clam", "Brian's a Bad Father", "A House Full of Peters", "'Family Guy' Through the Years", "Dead Dog Walking", and #342: "Rich Old Stewie")
2000–02	Titus	Writer (wrote episodes "The Perfect Thanksgiving", "Deprogramming Erin", "Hard-Ass", "Racing in the Streets" and "Errrr")
2002–03	Yes, Dear	Writer (wrote episodes "Wife Swapping" and "Savitsky's Tennis Club")
2005	Stewie Griffin: The Untold Story	Writer (wrote segment "Stewie B. Goode")
2011	Lovelives	Writer (wrote pilot)
2021–25	Resident Alien	Creator

== Awards and nominations ==
Year	Award	Nominated work	Result
2000	Primetime Emmy Award for Outstanding Music and Lyrics	Family Guy for "We Only Live To Kiss Your Ass"	Nominated
2005	Primetime Emmy Award for Outstanding Animated Program	Family Guy for "North by North Quahog"	Nominated
2006	Primetime Emmy Award for Outstanding Animated Program	Family Guy for "PTV"	Nominated
2006	DVD Exclusive Award for Best Screenplay	Family Guy for "Stewie B. Goode"	Won
2008	Primetime Emmy Award for Outstanding Animated Program	Family Guy for "Blue Harvest"	Nominated
2008	British Academy Television Award for Best International	Family Guy	Nominated
2009	Primetime Emmy Award for Outstanding Comedy Series	Family Guy	Nominated
2021	Hollywood Critics Association Award for Best Cable Series - Comedy	Resident Alien	Won
