= Da Boom =

- Family Guy episode
- Episode no.: Season 2 Episode 3
- Directed by: Bob Jaques
- Production code: 2ACX06
- Original air date: December 26, 1999

Guest appearances
- Patrick Duffy as Bobby Ewing; Victoria Principal as Pam Ewing; Jack Perkins as himself; Will Sasso as Randy Newman; Joey Slotnick

Episode chronology
← Previous "Holy Crap"	Next → "Brian in Love"
- Family Guy season 2

"Da Boom" is the third episode of the second season of the animated comedy series Family Guy and the tenth episode overall. It originally aired on the Fox network in the United States on December 26, 1999. The episode follows the Griffin family after a nuclear holocaust occurs due to the Year 2000 (Y2K) problem on New Year's Eve. The family travels in search of food, eventually deciding to establish a new town around a Twinkie factory. Peter takes over as mayor, but he becomes power-hungry and is eventually overthrown by the citizens.

The episode was written by Neil Goldman and Garrett Donovan, and directed by Bob Jaques in his only work on the series. It features guest performances by Patrick Duffy, Victoria Principal, Jack Perkins, Will Sasso, and Joey Slotnick, along with several recurring voice actors for the series. This is the first broadcast episode to feature Mila Kunis as the voice of Meg Griffin, following Lacey Chabert's departure from the series. However, Chabert would later return to voice Meg on a few rare occasions, such as in flashback or time-travel episodes.

== Plot ==
On December 31, 1999, Quahog prepares for New Year's Day and the new millennium, and the Griffins are invited to Quagmire's millennium party. At a grocery store, a man wearing a chicken suit offers Peter a coupon. Peter refuses, recalling a previous incident where he received an expired coupon from Ernie the Giant Chicken, which resulted in a massive, destructive fistfight. The man in the suit warns Peter that the world is about to end because of the Y2K bug. Taking the warning seriously, Peter locks his family in their basement wearing hazmat suits, despite Lois's objections.

Just after midnight, the Y2K bug strikes, causing a worldwide nuclear holocaust. Vehicles crash and missiles self-launch, destroying most of civilization and leaving the survivors mutated or injured. The Griffins survive unharmed, though their house is heavily damaged. Starving, Peter immediately eats all of their dehydrated meals without adding water. Remembering that Twinkies are rumored to be the only food capable of surviving a nuclear holocaust, Peter convinces the family to travel to Natick, Massachusetts, in hopes that the Twinkie factory is still standing.

Because their car runs out of gas, they are forced to walk the remaining distance to Natick. Upon arrival, they initially find no sign of any factories. Angry that the trip was seemingly for nothing, Stewie berates Peter before tripping and falling into a puddle of nuclear waste; his arms quickly mutate into tentacles. As the sun rises, the Twinkie factory is revealed to be standing in perfect condition nearby.

The family establishes the town of "New Quahog" around the factory, with Peter appointing himself mayor. Over time, New Quahog grows into a thriving, peaceful community. However, Peter becomes paranoid about safety and decides to manufacture guns using the metal pipes from the town's irrigation system, ignoring objections from Cleveland. Meanwhile, Stewie's lower body completely transforms into an octopus, and he lays hundreds of eggs.

Outraged by the destruction of their water system, the citizens banish Peter and his family from New Quahog. The community throws the manufactured weapons into a central firepit to destroy them, but they are suddenly overrun and incapacitated by hundreds of newly hatched octopus-Stewie clones. Walking away oblivious to the town's destruction, the Griffin family decides to head toward a Carvel factory in Framingham.

In a live-action epilogue parodying the soap opera Dallas, the entire episode is revealed to have been a dream experienced by Pam Ewing. Disturbed, she tells her husband Bobby that she dreamt about a strange episode of Family Guy. Bobby comforts her, but then pauses and asks, "What's Family Guy?" The couple then turns to look directly at the camera in confusion.

== Production ==
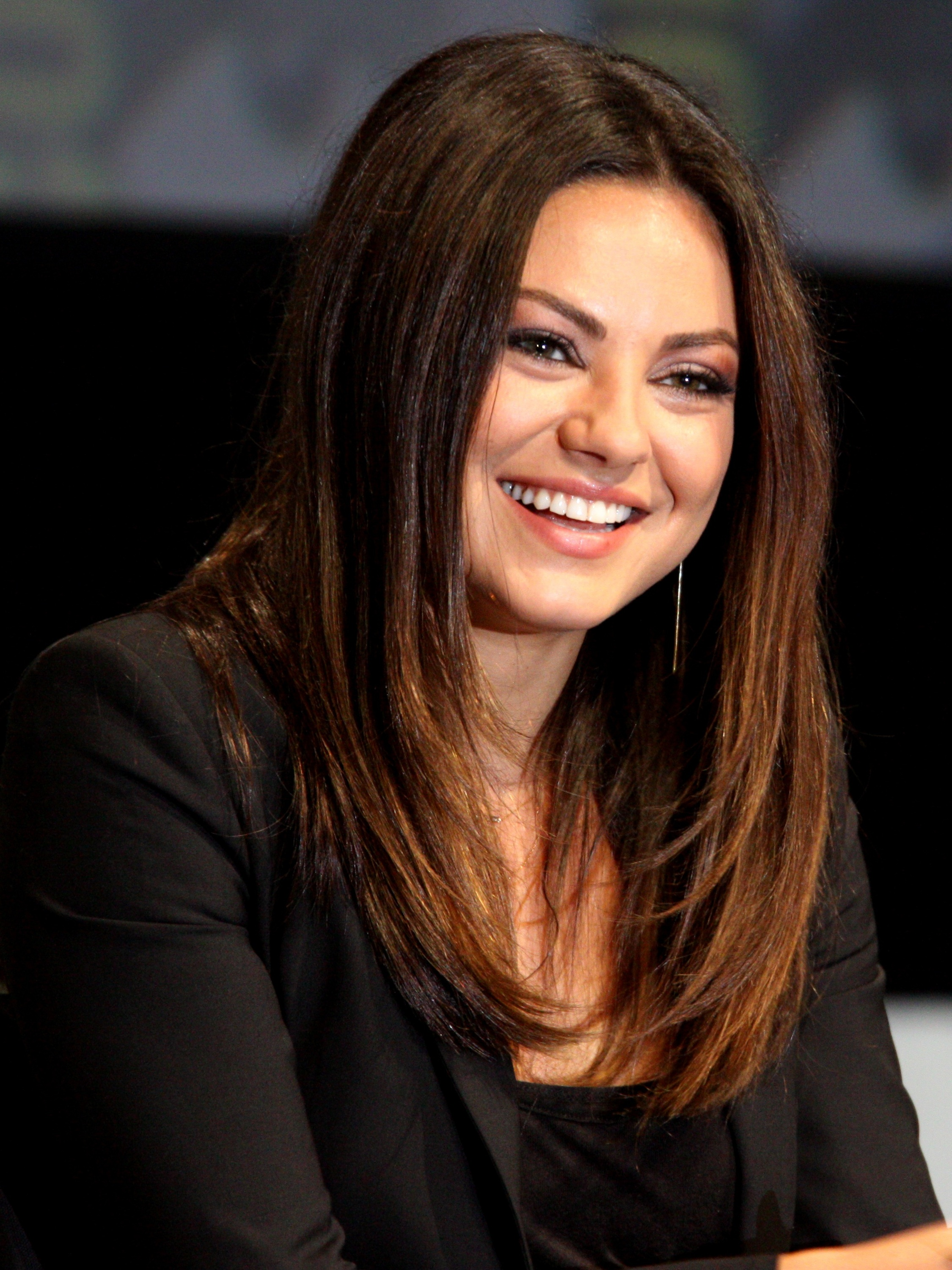
This is the first episode to feature Mila Kunis as the voice of Meg Griffin.

"Da Boom" was the third episode of the second season of Family Guy, and the first directed by Bob Jaques. It originally aired on December 26, 1999. The episode was written by the writing team of Neil Goldman and Garrett Donovan, who had previously penned first-season episodes such as "Mind Over Murder".

This was the first episode to feature Mila Kunis providing the voice of Meg Griffin. Lacey Chabert, the original voice of Meg, left the series due to schoolwork and time constraints while acting in Party of Five. Kunis won the role after subsequent auditions and a minor rewrite of the character, partly due to her performance on That '70s Show. Seth MacFarlane, the show's creator, called Kunis back after her initial audition to instruct her to speak more slowly, and later had her return to focus on enunciation. After she demonstrated control over the voice, MacFarlane officially hired her.

The episode also marks the debut of Ernie the Giant Chicken, an anthropomorphic chicken who serves as Peter's long-standing rival. Their sudden, extensive fistfight completely interrupts the main storyline. This encounter became a notable running gag, recurring in later episodes such as "Blind Ambition", "Internal Affairs", "No Chris Left Behind", and "Meet the Quagmires". The character is voiced by series writer Danny Smith.

In addition to the main cast, actress Victoria Principal; comedian Will Sasso; journalist Jack Perkins; voice actor Joey Slotnick; and actor Patrick Duffy guest starred. Recurring voice actress Lori Alan and actor Patrick Warburton also made brief appearances.

== Cultural references ==
The live-action epilogue parodies the season 9 finale "Blast from the Past" of the CBS soap opera Dallas, which famously erased the death of Bobby Ewing (Patrick Duffy) by revealing it was all a dream experienced by Pamela Ewing (Victoria Principal). Principal and Duffy reprised their roles to recreate the famous shower scene for the parody. Singer-songwriter Randy Newman also appears in a gag where he literally sings descriptions of everything he sees around him.

The core plot satirizes the real-world anxieties surrounding the Y2K bug. Cutaway gags include Peter intercepting the Trix cereal rabbit to eat the cereal himself, and Chris warning E.T. to hide when he mistakes Peter for a government agent. While traveling, the family is temporarily blocked by an interactive reference to the game show Family Feud. Stewie's line, "Game over, man! Game over!", is a direct quote from the science fiction film Aliens. Upon finding the Twinkie factory, Peter describes it using the exact words spoken by Dr. Ellie Arroway in the 1997 film Contact when witnessing a celestial event.

== Reception ==
The episode received highly positive reviews from television critics.

Ahsan Haque of IGN awarded the episode a perfect 10/10 rating, stating, "Overall, this episode easily ranks as one of the best episodes in the series. Almost every joke succeeds, and the far-fetched alternate reality storyline thoroughly entertains. Despite the fact that all of the events in the episode are revealed to be a dream, it doesn't take away from the high degree of amusement provided."

Tom Eames of entertainment website Digital Spy ranked the episode at number sixteen on his list of top Family Guy episodes, describing it as "classic bonkers Family Guy". He noted that the episode marked "potentially the first time fans realized this wasn't just a Simpsons ripoff."
