= Family Guy season 2 =

Season of television series

Family Guy
- Season 2
- DVD cover
- Showrunners: Seth MacFarlane; David Zuckerman
- Starring: Seth MacFarlane; Alex Borstein; Seth Green; Lacey Chabert; Mila Kunis
- No. of episodes: 21

Release
- Original network: Fox
- Original release: September 23, 1999 – August 1, 2000

Season chronology
- ← Previous; Season 1 Next → Season 3

The second season of Family Guy first aired on the Fox network in 21 episodes from September 23, 1999, to August 1, 2000. The series follows the dysfunctional Griffin family—father Peter, mother Lois, daughter Meg, son Chris, baby Stewie and their anthropomorphic dog Brian, all of whom reside in their hometown of Quahog, a fictional town in the U.S. state of Rhode Island. The show features the voices of series creator Seth MacFarlane, Alex Borstein, Seth Green, Lacey Chabert and later Mila Kunis in the roles of the Griffin family. The executive producers for the second production season were David Zuckerman and MacFarlane; the aired season also contained eight episodes which were holdovers from season one. During this season, Family Guy relocated from Sunday, with only one episode ("Da Boom") airing on a Sunday. The season aired its first two episodes on Thursdays, then aired mainly on Tuesdays between March and August 2000.

By the end of the second season, due to low ratings, Fox resorted to canceling Family Guy. However, following a last-minute reprieve, it returned for a third season in 2001. The series was canceled again in 2002; however, high ratings on Adult Swim and high DVD sales renewed Fox's interest in the series. The series returned for a total of 30 new episodes in 2005.

The season received a positive reception from critics, who called the series "extremely witty and darkly hilarious" that was "unfortunately" canceled. The Volume One DVD box set was released in Region 1 on April 15, 2003, and Region 2 on November 12, 2001. All twenty-one of the season's episodes are included in the volume. The first season's seven episodes were also included in the volume.

== Voice cast and characters ==
- Seth MacFarlane as Peter Griffin, Brian Griffin, Stewie Griffin, Glenn Quagmire, Tom Tucker, Carter Pewterschmidt
- Alex Borstein as Lois Griffin, Tricia Takenawa, Babs Pewterschmidt
- Seth Green as Chris Griffin
- Lacey Chabert as Meg Griffin (1999 and 5 episodes)
- Mila Kunis as Meg Griffin (1999–2000)

=== Supporting characters ===
- Lori Alan as Diane Simmons
- Carlos Alazraqui as Jonathan Weed
- Mike Henry as Cleveland Brown
- Patrick Warburton as Joe Swanson
- Adam West as Mayor Adam West

== Episodes ==
No. overall	No. in season	Title	Directed by	Written by	Original release date	Prod. code	U.S. viewers (millions)
8	1	"Peter, Peter, Caviar Eater"	Jeff Myers	Chris Sheridan	September 23, 1999	1ACX08	7.72
Lois's great-aunt, Marguerite Pewterschmidt, suddenly dies, leaving Lois and the rest of the family her posh summer mansion in a will. However, when Peter becomes convinced that he is rich and ultimately bids $100 million at a charity auction, he attempts to convince the landowners his house is valuable enough to trade instead. After several futile attempts to "prove" that Cherrywood Manor has enough historical value to cover the bid, Peter makes up with Lois and uncovers a set of hidden photographs which show several prominent American figures (including Abraham Lincoln, Robert E. Lee, and Ulysses S. Grant) at Cherrywood Manor, which was a brothel at the time. This discovery allows Peter to buy back his home after selling the pictures to the tabloids. Afterwards, Peter decides that he does not care what Lois's relatives think of him, since they were nothing more than "a bunch of pimps and whores".
9	2	"Holy Crap"	Neil Affleck	Danny Smith	September 30, 1999	1ACX11	5.40
Peter's devoutly religious, recently retired father Francis (Charles Durning) comes to visit, though he is intolerant of the others and makes life miserable for them; nevertheless, Peter tries to bond with him, since he had always been neglectful of his son. When all else fails, Peter resorts to kidnapping the Pope by taking the place of his regular driver to settle their conflict. He then brings the Pope back to his house, where the Pope attempts to mediate his problems. Afterwards, Peter reconciles with Francis, who is hired for the job of working as the Pope's security guard during his tour of the United States, pushing down people who are not allowed to be near the Pope and those who are allowed to be near the Pope, but are in his way, including Fox personnel, much to the Pope's dismay. At the end of the episode, Peter's mom shows up at the door and wishes to live with the family, prompting them to flee the house in an escape pod.
10	3	"Da Boom"	Bob Jaques	Neil Goldman & Garrett Donovan	December 26, 1999	2ACX06	9.37
After a man in a chicken suit warns Peter that the world will end because of Y2K, Peter locks his family up in their basement on December 31, 1999. A nuclear holocaust then occurs, destroying much of the world and mutating, injuring, and killing many of the citizens of Quahog. The family then travel with the surviving citizens of Quahog to Natick, in hopes that the Twinkie factory survived; during the process, Stewie is exposed to the radiation and mutates into an octopus. However, upon their arrival, they find the factory to be deserted, and must survive alongside the citizens of the city in Natick (dubbed "New Quahog"). Peter is elected head of the town, but makes several fatal mistakes and is chased out of "New Quahog" alongside his family by an angry mob, singing "Left foot, right foot" the whole way out. The episode ends with a live action sequence involving Pamela Barnes Ewing waking up to find her husband Bobby in the shower. She tells him about the episode, which was a dream, thus retconning the entire episode, a parody of the Dallas episode "Blast from the Past". NOTE: This is the first episode to have Mila Kunis as Meg.
11	4	"Brian in Love"	Jack Dyer	Gary Janetti	March 7, 2000	2ACX01	7.33
Stewie is blamed for urinating all over the house; however, it is actually Brian who is responsible for it. The next morning, Peter decides to potty train Stewie, with little success. When the family goes to the local supermarket to buy groceries, Brian urinates when they are at the checkout line, revealing to the family that Stewie is innocent. The family attempts to counsel Brian with therapy, where Brian's psychiatrist Dr. Kaplan believes that he is having a mid-life crisis. Brian attempts to entertain himself by exploring the world, but upon returning home, Stewie gets revenge on Brian and frames him by urinating all over the living room. Brian is falsely accused and the family return him to Dr. Kaplan to find the true cause. After revealing that his most recent accident happened after watching Lois and Peter engaging in a water fight on the car, Dr. Kaplan informs Brian that he is most likely in love with Lois. After discussing the situation, both agree to remain friends. Afterwards, Brian decides to live life to the fullest by golfing with Peter on the local golf course.
12	5	"Love Thy Trophy"	Jack Dyer	Mike Barker & Matt Weitzman	March 14, 2000	1ACX13	6.68
The neighbors fight over a trophy won for the best parade float, and when it ends up getting stolen, everyone in town becomes a prime suspect. Meanwhile, Meg takes a job as a waitress at a pancake restaurant to earn money for a Prada bag, and claims that Stewie is her crack-addicted son for sympathy tips. NOTE: Due to airing out of order, Meg is voiced by an uncredited Lacey Chabert.
13	6	"Death Is a Bitch"	Michael Dante DiMartino	Ricky Blitt	March 21, 2000	1ACX14	6.97
Peter gets out of paying a hefty hospital bill by declaring that he's dead, only to get a surprise visit from Death himself. However, Death injures his ankle while chasing Peter and is unable to do his job, which makes everyone on Earth immortal, so Peter must stand in as the new Grim Reaper. NOTE: Due to airing out of order, Meg is voiced by an uncredited Lacey Chabert.
14	7	"The King Is Dead"	Monte Young	Craig Hoffman	March 28, 2000	1ACX15	6.91
Lois is appointed the director of Quahog's theatre company after the former director dies and attempts to produce The King and I. She appoints Peter as the producer to keep him out of her way, but his plans to recreate the play send him on a power trip that replaces her as the show's director. NOTE: Due to airing out of order, Meg is voiced by an uncredited Lacey Chabert.
15	8	"I Am Peter, Hear Me Roar"	Monte Young	Chris Sheridan	March 28, 2000	2ACX02	7.62
After telling a sexist joke at work, Peter is forced to go to a women's retreat camp and comes back a sensitive feminist. Lois and the others become greatly disturbed by his new attitude, and when his condition worsens, they do everything in their power to restore his manhood.
16	9	"If I'm Dyin', I'm Lyin'"	Swinton O. Scott III	Chris Sheridan	April 4, 2000	1ACX12	6.24
When Peter and Chris's favorite TV show is cancelled, Peter pretends Chris is terminally ill and tells the "Grant-A-Dream Foundation" that his "final wish" is to get the show back on the air. When Chris does not die, however, Peter goes too far and declares himself to be a healer, starting his own religion. NOTE: Due to airing out of order, Meg is voiced by an uncredited Lacey Chabert.
17	10	"Running Mates"	John Holmquist	Neil Goldman & Garrett Donovan	April 11, 2000	1ACX09	6.30
Lois runs for President of the Quahog School Board, but Peter runs against her so he can save the job of his favorite teacher from his high school years, smearing Lois's image and winning by a landslide. But things take a turn for the worse when Chris is caught with pornography in school, so Peter must set all things right. NOTE: This is the last episode to have an uncredited Lacey Chabert as Meg.
18	11	"A Picture Is Worth 1,000 Bucks"	Gavin Dell	Craig Hoffman	April 18, 2000	2ACX07	6.07
Peter begins to fear that his name will be forgotten, and strives to start a legacy of his own. When he sells a painting Chris gave him to an art gallery, Peter discovers that he can use Chris's talents to fulfill this dream, taking the family to New York to see Chris become famous.
19	12	"Fifteen Minutes of Shame"	Scott Wood	Steve Callaghan	April 25, 2000	2ACX08	6.62
After being embarrassed by her family during her slumber party, Meg brings them on a daytime talk show out of revenge, where a TV producer turns the Griffins' dysfunctional life into a reality show titled "The Real Life Griffins". Things go awry and Meg abandons everyone; as a result, an actress is brought in to play Meg on "The Real Life Griffins", and soon Meg finds that the rest of the family have been replaced by celebrity actors Tom Arnold, Fran Drescher, Philip Seymour Hoffman, and Mary-Kate and Ashley Olsen.
20	13	"Road to Rhode Island"	Dan Povenmire	Gary Janetti	May 30, 2000	2ACX12	6.47
Brian volunteers to bring Stewie home from his grandparents' house in California, but the two miss their plane and must travel on foot for a cross-country journey back home. Meanwhile, Peter becomes addicted to watching a collection of marriage counseling videos hosted by a porn star.
21	14	"Let's Go to the Hop"	Glen Hill	Mike Barker & Matt Weitzman	June 6, 2000	2ACX04	5.70
Peter goes undercover as a high school student named "Lando Griffin" to kick youths off the habit of toad licking, making him extremely popular in Meg's school. Meg asks her dad out to the upcoming school dance in the hopes of becoming popular herself, but Peter chooses to go out with popular Connie D'Amico instead.
22	15	"Dammit Janet"	Bert Ring	Mike Barker & Matt Weitzman	June 13, 2000	2ACX09	7.34
Stewie is sent off to daycare to learn social skills where he falls in love with a girl named Janet. Meanwhile, Lois begins wishing that her life were more exciting, so she gets a job as a flight attendant at Peter's request, who exploits Lois's job position as a means to get free travel for himself.
23	16	"There's Something About Paulie"	Monte Young	Ricky Blitt	June 27, 2000	1ACX10	6.88
Peter befriends a mob boss's nephew, Big Fat Paulie, while paying off a debt. But when he says that Lois does not want them to hang out anymore, Paulie misinterprets the situation and thinks that Peter wants him to kill her so they can still be friends. When Peter explains this to Paulie, he agrees to call off the hit, but he is suddenly gunned down by rival mobsters before he can place the phone call. As such, Peter must find a way to call off the hit.
24	17	"He's Too Sexy for His Fat"	Glen Hill	Chris Sheridan	June 27, 2000	2ACX10	6.56
Chris becomes insecure about his weight and goes on a diet, but Peter opts for plastic surgery and ends up getting it himself. Now thin and handsome, Peter becomes swayed by the special treatment he receives from people he comes across, while Lois, in spite of her morals, finds that she can not resist him. Meanwhile, Stewie starts overeating to taunt Chris, but ends up becoming obese.
25	18	"E. Peterbus Unum"	Rob Renzetti	Neil Goldman & Garrett Donovan	July 12, 2000	2ACX13	5.50
While confronting the mayor about zoning issues around his house, Peter discovers that his house is not anywhere on the map, prompting him to secede his house from the rest of the United States, creating the country "Petoria". His country gains no respect, so he invades the U.S. and annexes Joe's pool (which is then given the name "Joehio"). The United States military after a few days surrounds and blockades the nation of Petoria with tanks and missiles. Peter negotiates repatriation and repatriates his country and returns Joe’s pool. In the end, the episode’s events turn out to have been filmed and used ever since in social studies classes 200 years in the future.
26	19	"The Story on Page One"	Gavin Dell	Craig Hoffman	July 18, 2000	2ACX14	5.66
Meg signs up for the high school newspaper club as Brown University's academic requirement, and gets a story on Mayor Adam West's corruption, but Peter, thinking Meg's story is boring, replaces it with an article alleging Luke Perry's supposed homosexuality. This lands Meg in hot legal water with Perry, so Peter decides to "prove" that the actor is gay.
27	20	"Wasted Talent"	Bert Ring	Story by : Dave Collard & Ken Goin; Teleplay by : Mike Barker & Matt Weitzman	July 25, 2000	2ACX15	6.82
Peter wins a tour of a magical brewery owned by Pawtucket Pat (à la Charlie and the Chocolate Factory and its 1971 film adaptation), while Lois desperately searches for a talented piano player to beat her rival at an upcoming talent competition, finding one in the form of her husband, who can only play professionally when he's drunk.
28	21	"Fore, Father"	Scott Wood	Bobby Bowman	August 1, 2000	2ACX16	6.15
Peter thinks his son lacks responsibility, so he gets him a job at a golf course. However, when he discovers that Cleveland's son has the potential to become a pro golf player, he forsakes Chris to train the hyperactive Cleveland Jr. instead. Discouraged, Chris finds a new father figure in Quagmire.

== Production ==
In 2002, Family Guy was canceled after three seasons due to low ratings. The show was first canceled after the 1999–2000 season, but a last-minute reprieve led to its return for a third season in 2001. During the third season, Fox announced that the show was cancelled for good. Fox tried to sell rights for reruns of the show, but it was hard to find networks that were interested; Cartoon Network eventually bought the rights, "[...] basically for free", according to the president of 20th Century Fox Television Production.

When the reruns were shown on Cartoon Network's Adult Swim in 2003, Family Guy became Adult Swim's most-watched show with an average 1.9 million viewers an episode. Following Family Guy's high ratings on Adult Swim, the first and second seasons was released on DVD in April 2003. Sales of the DVD set reached 2.2 million copies, becoming the best-selling television DVD of 2003 and the second-highest-selling television DVD ever, behind the first season of Comedy Central's Chappelle's Show. The third season DVD release also sold more than a million copies. The show's popularity in both DVD sales and reruns rekindled Fox's interest in it. They ordered 35 new episodes in 2004, marking the first revival of a television show based on DVD sales. Fox president Gail Berman said that it was one of her most difficult decisions to cancel the show, and was therefore happy it would return. The network also began production of a film based on the series.

== Reception ==
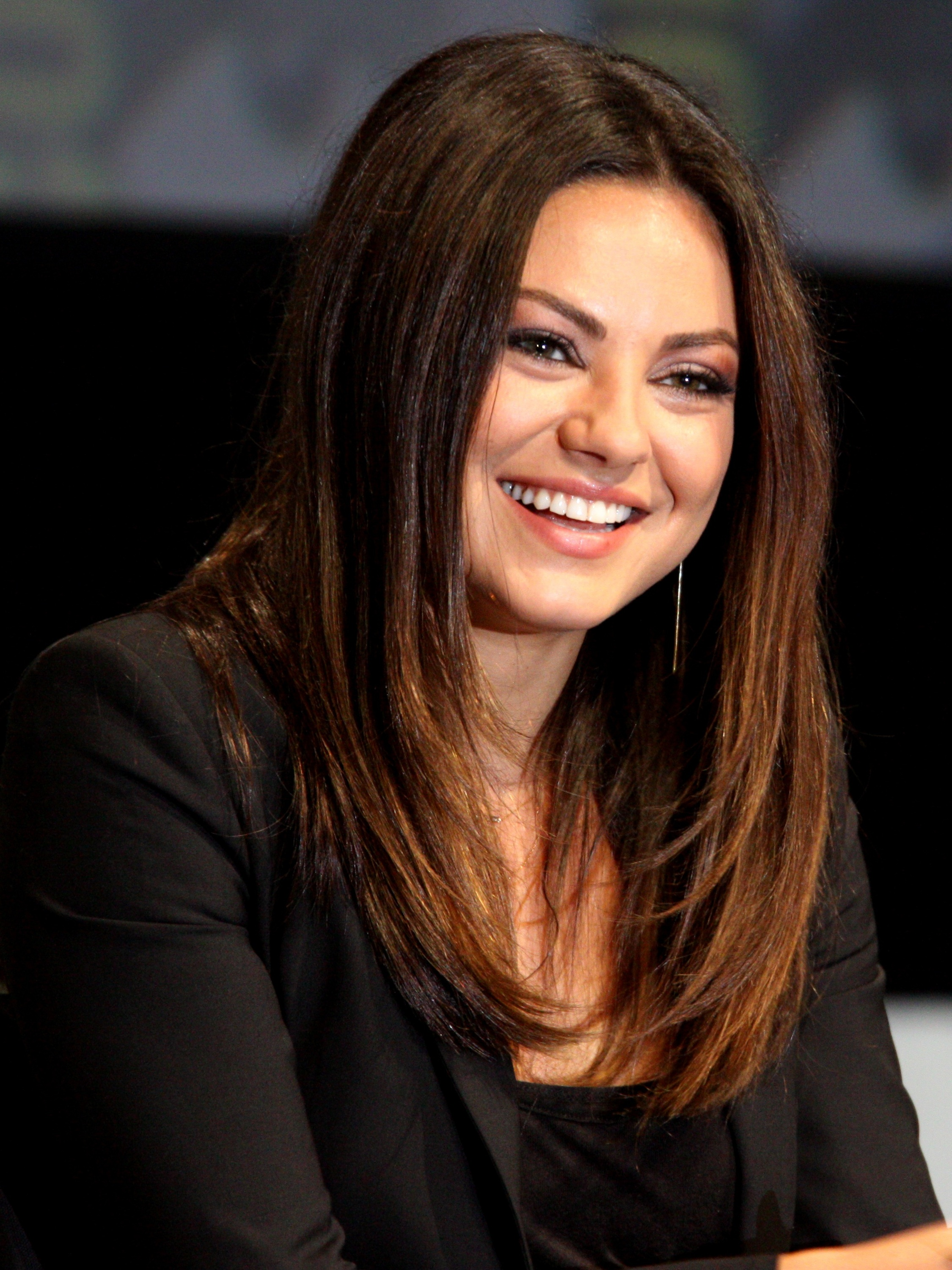
Mila Kunis replaced Lacey Chabert as the voice of Meg from the third episode of this season onwards.

The second season of Family Guy received positive reviews from critics. Aaron Beierle of DVD Talk said "Often brilliant, extremely witty and darkly hilarious, Family Guy was unfortunately canceled after Fox bumped it around six or seven different time slots. Fans of the show should definitely pick up this terrific sets [sic], while those who haven't seen it should consider giving it a look." Fewer critics responded negatively to the season, including Ken Tucker of Entertainment Weekly, who graded the series a "D", and named it the worst show of the 1999–2000 television season. Mark Graham noted "MacFarlane's incredibly rocky relationship with both the magazine and its lead television critic, Ken Tucker" in a blog on the New York magazine website. Tucker has also criticized the show for perceived anti-Semitism. L. Brent Bozell III expressed in a column of his written in 1999 that he felt that the episode "Holy Crap" promoted anti-Catholicism.

The Parents Television Council, a watchdog and frequent critic of Family Guy, had initially speculated that Family Guy would be "pushing the envelope" before the series' 1999 premiere. In May 2000, in its weekly "E-Alert" email newsletter, the PTC launched a letter-writing campaign to the Fox network to persuade the network to cancel Family Guy following a return from a long hiatus in the show's second season, due to what the PTC claimed were "strong advertiser resistance and low ratings". In addition, Family Guy made the PTC's 2000 "worst prime-time shows for family viewing".

== Home media release ==
The first and second seasons were released under the title Family Guy Volume One; this standard four-disc DVD box set debuted in Region 1 on April 15, 2003. Distributed by 20th Century Fox Television, it included several DVD extras such as episode commentaries, behind-the-scenes footage, and online promo spots. The same episodes, without the special features, were released in Region 2 on November 12, 2001, and in Region 4 on October 20, 2003.
