= Family Guy season 3 =

Season of television series

Family Guy
- Season 3
- DVD cover
- Showrunners: Seth MacFarlane; David Zuckerman; Daniel Palladino
- Starring: Seth MacFarlane; Alex Borstein; Seth Green; Mila Kunis
- No. of episodes: 22

Release
- Original network: Fox; Adult Swim (episode 22)
- Original release: July 11, 2001 – November 9, 2003

Season chronology
- ← Previous; Season 2 Next → Season 4

The third season of Family Guy first aired on the Fox network in 22 episodes from July 11, 2001, to November 9, 2003, before being released as a DVD box set and in syndication. It premiered with the episode "The Thin White Line" and finished with "Family Guy Viewer Mail #1". An episode that was not part of the season's original broadcast run, "When You Wish Upon a Weinstein", was included in the DVD release and later shown on both Adult Swim and Fox. The third season of Family Guy continues the adventures of the dysfunctional Griffin family—father Peter, mother Lois, daughter Meg, son Chris, baby Stewie and Brian, the family dog, who reside in their hometown of Quahog.

The executive producers for the third production season were Dan Palladino and series creator Seth MacFarlane. The aired season also contained nine episodes which were holdovers from season two, which were produced by MacFarlane and David Zuckerman.

Although Family Guy was initially canceled in 2000 due to low ratings, following a last-minute reprieve, the series returned for a third season in 2001. The season's first 10 episodes aired on Wednesday nights, before airing them on Thursdays; one episode, "A Very Special Family Guy Freakin' Christmas," would air on a Friday, before concluding by airing Thursdays. The series was canceled again in 2002; however, high ratings on Adult Swim and high DVD sales renewed Fox's interest in the series. The series returned for a total of 30 new episodes in 2005.

The episode "Brian Wallows and Peter's Swallows" won an Emmy Award for Primetime Emmy Award for Best Song. Creator MacFarlane, the recipient of the award, noted that the episode's director Dan Povenmire deserved to have received the award for the contribution the visuals made to the episode's win. Povenmire responded humorously, "That's a nice sentiment and all, but did he offer to give me his? No! And it's not like he doesn't already have two of his own just sitting in his house!"

== Voice cast and characters ==
- Seth MacFarlane as Peter Griffin, Brian Griffin, Stewie Griffin, Glenn Quagmire, Tom Tucker, Carter Pewterschmidt, Dr. Hartman, Seamus Levine.
- Alex Borstein as Lois Griffin, Tricia Takenawa, Babs Pewterschmidt
- Seth Green as Chris Griffin, Neil Goldman
- Mila Kunis as Meg Griffin

=== Supporting characters ===
- Lori Alan as Diane Simmons
- Carlos Alazraqui as Jonathan Weed
- Mike Henry as Cleveland Brown
- Patrick Warburton as Joe Swanson
- Adam West as Mayor Adam West
- Jennifer Tilly as Bonnie Swanson

== Episodes ==
No. overall	No. in season	Title	Directed by	Written by	Original release date	Prod. code	U.S. viewers (millions)
29	1	"The Thin White Line"	Glen Hill	Steve Callaghan	July 11, 2001	2ACX17	5.99
Peter wins the Griffin family a cruise after winning a company competition. Shortly before the family prepares to leave, Joe recognizes the sensitivity of Brian's nose and offers him a job detecting drugs as a police sniffer dog. At the airport, Brian uncovers a bystander carrying cocaine; however, he accidentally inhales it and becomes addicted to it, with him becoming diritier and more hostile towards his family. Eventually, the family stages an intervention for Brian with his psychiatrist, during which he has an emotional breakdown. The family compromises on sending him to rehab with their vacation money. Peter joins Brian since he now cannot go on vacation, and the two cause unrest among their fellow patients by causing premature births in pregnant teens. After the two are caught, Peter is accused of being Brian's "x-factor"; however, Brian manages to defend him and decides to leave the center. The Griffins throw a party to celebrate Brian's return, but are shocked when he announces that he is leaving Quahog to continue the search for the thrill of his life.
30	2	"Brian Does Hollywood"	Gavin Dell	Gary Janetti	July 18, 2001	2ACX20	6.10
Brian moves to Los Angeles with his cousin Jasper after his drug rehabilitation and inadvertently becomes a film director. The family decides to visit Brian for support in his new career; however, when it turns out Brian is directing pornography, he attempts to keep it a secret from the family. Meanwhile, Stewie auditions for Kids Say the Darndest Things in order to unleash a mass hypnosis; however, during the show the following night, host Bill Cosby grabs Stewie's device and unwittingly foils his plan. Elsewhere, Brian is nominated for Best Director at the Woody Awards for adult films; Jasper informs the Griffin family about Brian's job and attend the awards, much to Brian's relief. By the end of the episode, he decides to return to Quahog with his family.
31	3	"Mr. Griffin Goes to Washington"	Brian Hogan	Ricky Blitt	July 25, 2001	2ACX11	6.17
The Happy-Go-Lucky Toy Factory is purchased by a tobacco conglomerate. Lois develops concern for Peter and believes the company is promoting underage smoking; Peter attempts to confront management, but is distractingly appointed president in the process; the family is pampered and treated elegantly as a result. At a meeting, the company decides to send Peter to Washington, D.C. in order to prevent a new anti-smoking bill from being passed into Congress. At home, Lois catches Stewie smoking and attempts to take the family to the meeting in Washington; although Peter prepares to deliver his speech on the floors of Congress assembled, he spots Stewie coughing from smoking and tells Congress to reject El Dorado's proposal. When they agree, El Dorado is fined as a result, driving the company to bankruptcy.
32	4	"One If by Clam, Two If by Sea"	Dan Povenmire	Jim Bernstein & Michael Shipley	August 1, 2001	2ACX19	5.82
A hurricane demolishes the majority of the buildings in Quahog—except the Drunken Clam; however, the bar's owner leaves for Florida and sells it to an Englishman named Nigel Pinchley, who turns it into a British stereotypical pub. Upset over the loss of their favorite bar and failing to find another one, Peter, Quagmire, Cleveland, and Joe storm a British ship in an attempt to recreate the Boston Tea Party with beer. The following night, the pub burns down; Peter, Quagmire, Cleveland, and Joe are blamed and thrown in jail. In prison, one of the toughest criminals Joe ever jailed, Steve Bellows, plans to kill him and the others at midnight on Saturday. Meanwhile, in a parody of My Fair Lady, Stewie tries to teach Nigel's daughter, Eliza, to speak "proper" English and overcome her "common" Cockney accent as part of a bet with Brian; although he manages to teach her how to speak "properly", at the party, she urinates in front of everybody, slipping back to her Cockney accent and making Stewie lose the bet. Lois, Bonnie, and Loretta decide to investigate the bar's destruction, and discover that Nigel had withdrawn a large amount of insurance money the day before the pub burned down, they become suspicious. Lois seduces Nigel into confessing, and his insurance agent discovers the entire story. In jail, Peter, Quagmire, Cleveland, and Joe are rescued before Steve has a chance to kill them, and the Drunken Clam is reinstated to its normal form. In London, Nigel is hanged and Eliza is sent to an orphanage.
33	5	"And the Wiener Is..."	Bert Ring	Mike Barker & Matt Weitzman	August 8, 2001	2ACX22	5.40
Peter is intimidated by Chris' larger penis and then becomes very self-conscious about his own manhood, joining a gun club to make himself feel more masculine. Peter decides to take Chris on a hunting trip with his new gun, where the two are attacked by a bear; Chris manages to save both of them by making loud noises and jumping in front of the bear. Peter apologizes to Chris and realizes that being a man is about bravery and not size. Meanwhile, Meg tries out for cheerleading but is accepted into the flag girl squad instead, where she is pelted with rancid meat by several of the more popular children in her school. The next day, Lois instructs Meg to make friends with Connie D'Amico and prank her whenever the time is right. However, the plan fails when the popular kids trick Meg at Connie's sixteenth birthday, where they trick her into kissing a pig she thought was a popular boy. However, Lois and Meg have the last laugh when the former sends Quagmire to molest the teenagers.
34	6	"Death Lives"	Rob Renzetti	Mike Henry	August 15, 2001	2ACX21	5.19
On their wedding anniversary, Peter sends Lois all over Quahog on a scavenger hunt so he can go play golf. But when Peter gets struck by lightning and has a near-death experience, he meets Death again, who explains to Peter his marriage is in trouble if he does not have a revelation, and fast.
35	7	"Lethal Weapons"	Brian Hogan	Chris Sheridan	August 22, 2001	2ACX18	5.92
Lois takes taijutsu lessons to fight back against the leafers (New York tourists) overtaking the town, but worries that her violence may be a bad influence on her family. When anger management only makes everyone even more angry, they engage in an all-out brawl to get it out of their system.
36	8	"The Kiss Seen Around the World"	Pete Michels	Mark Hentemann	August 29, 2001	3ACX02	6.46
Meg applies for an internship at Quahog 5 (due to her crush on news anchor Tom Tucker), but so does the annoying Neil. When she is reluctantly driven to kiss Neil, he broadcasts the word of their "love" on the news. Meanwhile, a bully learns not to mess with Stewie when he steals his new tricycle, and a man embarrasses Peter by calling him a phony wherever he goes.
37	9	"Mr. Saturday Knight"	Michael Dante DiMartino	Steve Callaghan	September 5, 2001	3ACX04	5.77
Peter's boss, Mr. Weed, dies during a dinner with the Griffin family, and the toy factory is demolished as a result. Now unemployed, and failing to find himself other jobs, Peter decides to live his dream of being a Renaissance fair jouster, where he must defend his family's honor from his former idol.
38	10	"A Fish Out of Water"	Bert Ring	Alex Borstein & Mike Henry	September 19, 2001	3ACX05	5.37
After nearly two weeks of unemployment, Peter decides to begin a new career as a fisherman, but faces problems when he has to pay off a boat loan, so he tries to catch the bounty for a legendary fish. Meanwhile, Lois takes Meg to the beach for spring break, but Lois ends up having more fun and getting on better with the spring breaking teens than Meg.
39	11	"Emission Impossible"	Peter Shin	Dave Collard & Ken Goin	November 8, 2001	3ACX01	5.28
After delivering Lois' sister's newborn child, Lois and Peter decide to have another baby, prompting Stewie to do whatever he can to stop it, even if it means shrinking himself and wiping out every sperm in Peter's testicles. However, when he meets a sperm just like himself, Stewie begins to reconsider.
40	12	"To Love and Die in Dixie"	Dan Povenmire	Steve Callaghan	November 15, 2001	3ACX09	5.0
The family moves to the deep South when a criminal threatens to kill Chris for witnessing his crime. There Chris befriends a kid named Sam, whom he is forbidden to see by Sam's father when Peter questions the accuracy of a Civil War reenactment. But there seems to be more to Sam than meets the eye.
41	13	"Screwed the Pooch"	Pete Michels	Dave Collard & Ken Goin	November 29, 2001	3ACX08	4.67
The family visits Lois' parents, the Pewterschmidts, where Brian takes out all of his pent-up sexual energy on the Pewterschmidts' prize-winning racing greyhound, Sea Breeze. A custody battle then ensues when Sea Breeze is revealed to be pregnant, and Brian is threatened to be neutered.
42	14	"Peter Griffin: Husband, Father... Brother?"	Scott Wood	Mike Barker & Matt Weitzman	December 6, 2001	3ACX06	4.25
While teaching Chris about his Irish heritage, Peter discovers that he has a black ancestor. When this affects his social status and he finds out that his ancestor was a slave to Lois' family, Peter fights back. Meanwhile, Stewie tries to learn mind control from the school cheerleaders.
43	15	"Ready, Willing, and Disabled"	Andi Klein	Alex Barnow & Marc Firek	December 20, 2001	3ACX07	4.69
Joe feels discouraged after failing to catch a thief during a chase, so Peter tries to get his self-confidence back by entering him in a handicapped people's decathlon, but with Joe still helpless, he rigs his drinks with steroids. Meanwhile, Chris, Meg and Stewie fight over $26 in a money clip.
44	16	"A Very Special Family Guy Freakin' Christmas"	Brian Hogan	Danny Smith	December 21, 2001	2ACX03	4.53
It is Christmas time in Quahog, a time when Lois' plans for a perfect holiday blow up in her face, causing her to break down and go berserk. Stewie uses his role as the baby Jesus in the town play to be good for Santa Claus, about whom he has become paranoid, and to bring Lois back to Earth.
45	17	"Brian Wallows and Peter's Swallows"	Dan Povenmire	Ali Adler	January 17, 2002	3ACX03	5.36
Brian gets a DUI and, as punishment, he is forced to care for Pearl, a bitter old lady. After discovering that she was actually a brilliant opera singer during the 1940s and 1950s who was shamed into seclusion once she faced demands to sing her famous radio jingles, Brian tries to brighten her life. Meanwhile, Peter grows a beard and discovers that a family of rare swallows have housed themselves in it.
46	18	"From Method to Madness"	Bert Ring	Mike Barker & Matt Weitzman	January 24, 2002	3ACX11	5.32
Stewie signs up for an acting class, where he's paired up with a stuck-up child star named Olivia. They become a hit, though the fame quickly sets in and they soon start bickering. Meanwhile, Peter and Lois object to Meg dating a nudist, though later have second thoughts after seeing her upset.
47	19	"Stuck Together, Torn Apart"	Michael Dante DiMartino	Mark Hentemann	January 31, 2002	3ACX10	4.60
Peter and Lois are advised to go through a trial separation after Peter becomes jealous over Lois reuniting with an old boyfriend, and he hooks up with Jennifer Love Hewitt. Meanwhile, Stewie and Brian get stuck together after Stewie plays around with industrial-strength glue.
48	20	"Road to Europe"	Dan Povenmire	Daniel Palladino	February 7, 2002	3ACX13	4.35
Stewie becomes obsessed with a British kids' show and runs away to be part of the cast, and Brian gives chase in an attempt to bring him back. Meanwhile, Peter and Lois go to see a Kiss concert, where Lois reveals she knows nothing about the band, much to Peter's humiliation.
49	21	"Family Guy Viewer Mail #1"	Pete Michels	Gene Laufenberg	February 14, 2002	3ACX12	4.63
49	21	"Family Guy Viewer Mail #1"	Scott Wood	Seth MacFarlane	February 14, 2002	3ACX12	4.63
49	21	"Family Guy Viewer Mail #1"	Michael Dante DiMartino	Jim Bernstein & Michael Shipley	February 14, 2002	3ACX12	4.63
Brian and Stewie host a special episode of Family Guy, featuring three non-canon stories created from viewer requests. No Bones About It – A genie comes to Peter to grant him wishes; his last wish makes it so that he has no bones and must deal with life as a lump of lard. Supergriffins – The Griffins are exposed to nuclear waste and gain superpowers, which lead them to terrorize the city. Li'l Griffins – Tot-like versions of Peter and Quagmire try to out-brave each other in a haunted house to impress Lois in this Little Rascals parody.
50	22	"When You Wish Upon a Weinstein"	Dan Povenmire	Ricky Blitt	September 9, 2003 (DVD); November 9, 2003 (Adult Swim); December 10, 2004 (Fox)	2ACX05	4.88 (Fox)
Peter prays for a Jew to help him with his money woes. After befriending a Jewish accountant, Max Weinstein, and discovering the wonders of their religion, Peter gets the ridiculous idea of converting Chris to Judaism as soon as possible so he will be successful in life, but Lois tries to stop him, claiming that success is not based on religion. Note: This episode was banned from airing on FOX until 2004 due to the content's potential to be interpreted as anti-Semitic.

== Production ==
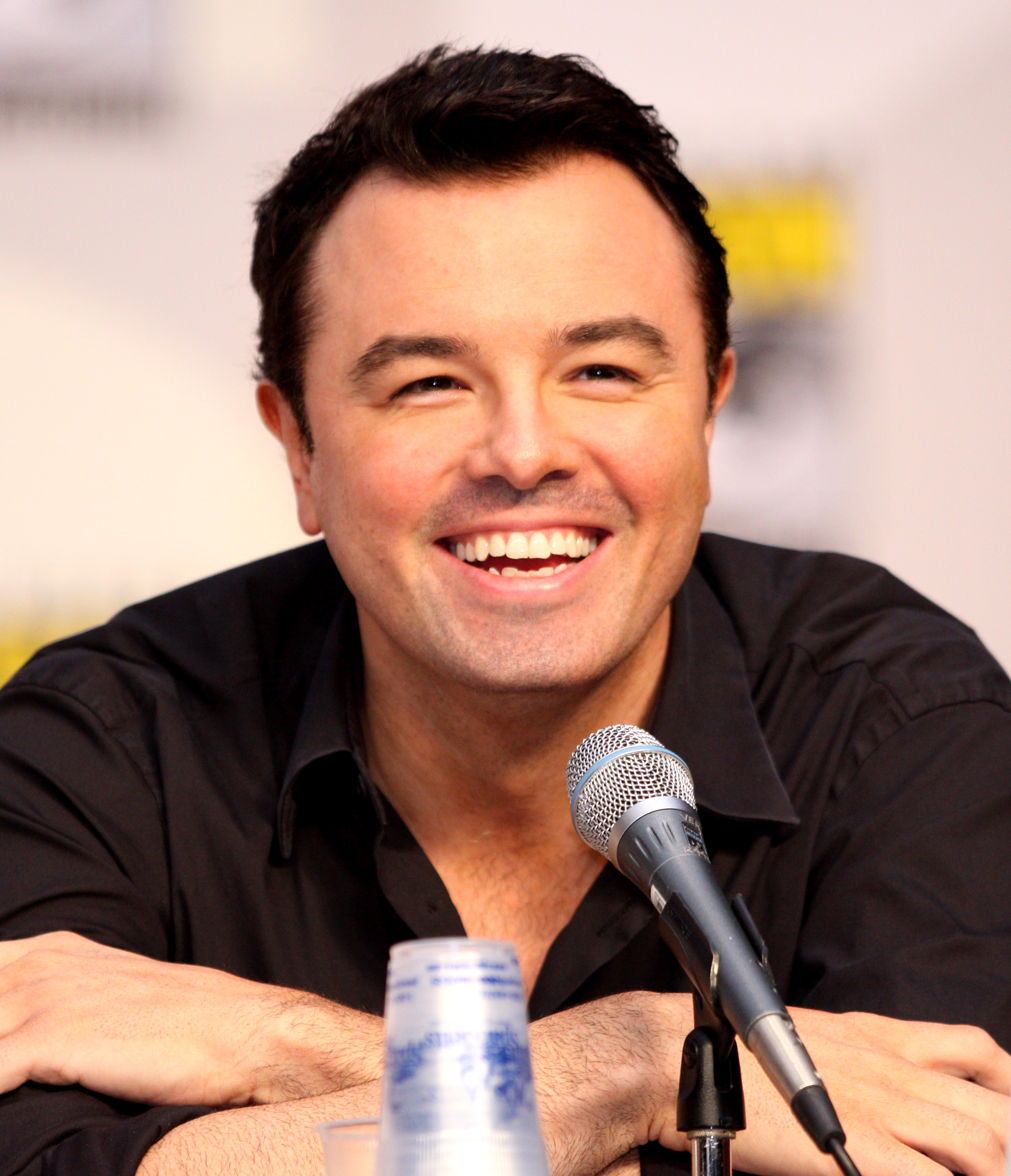
Seth MacFarlane won an Emmy Award for Best Song for the episode "Brian Wallows and Peter's Swallows"

Family Guy was first canceled in 2000 following the series' second season, but following a last-minute reprieve, it returned for a third season in 2001. In 2002, the series was canceled again after three seasons due to low ratings. Fox attempted to sell the rights for reruns of the show, but it was difficult to find networks that were interested; Cartoon Network eventually bought the rights, "[...] basically for free", according to the president of 20th Century Fox Television Production.

When the reruns were shown on Cartoon Network's Adult Swim in 2003, Family Guy became Adult Swim's most-watched show with an average 1.9 million viewers an episode. Following Family Guy's high ratings on Adult Swim, the first two seasons were released on DVD in April 2003. Sales of the DVD set reached 2.2 million copies, becoming the best-selling television DVD of 2003 and the second highest-selling television DVD ever, behind the first season of Comedy Central's Chappelle's Show. The third season DVD release also sold more than a million copies. The show's popularity in both DVD sales and reruns rekindled Fox's interest in it. They ordered 35 new episodes in 2004, marking the first revival of a television show based on DVD sales. Fox president Gail Berman said that it was one of her most difficult decisions to cancel the show, and was therefore happy it would return. The network also began production of a film based on the series.

Dan Povenmire, who became a director on Family Guy during the series' second season, took a more prominent role in directing by the third season, having directed five episodes. Creator Seth MacFarlane granted Povenmire substantial creative freedom. Povenmire recalled that MacFarlane would tell him "We've got two minutes to fill. Give me some visual gags. Do whatever you want. I trust you." Povenmire praised this management style for letting him "have [...] fun." Povenmire brought realism, and material from his own experiences, to the visual direction of Family Guy. For "One If by Clam, Two If by Sea", several characters carried out fosse moves in prison — Povenmire went into the office of a color artist, Cynthia Macintosh, who had been a professional dancer, and had her strike poses in order for him to better illustrate the sequence. In the episode "To Love and Die in Dixie" Povenmire drew on his childhood in the deep south to sequence a background scene where the "redneck" character nonchalantly kicks a corpse into the nearby river.

The episode, When You Wish Upon a Weinstein was supposed to premiere in 2000, but Fox executives were worried that the episode could be interpreted as antisemitic, and prohibited the episode from airing after it completed post production. That episode later aired on Adult Swim in 2003 and then on Fox in 2004.

== Reception ==
The episode "Brian Wallows and Peter's Swallows" won an Emmy Award for Best Song. Creator MacFarlane, the recipient of the award, noted that the episode's director Dan Povenmire deserved to have received the award for the contribution the visuals made to the episode's win. Povenmire jokingly responded "That's a nice sentiment and all, but did he offer to give me his? No! And it's not like he doesn't already have two of his own just sitting in his house!"

The third season has received positive reviews from critics. In his review for the Family Guy Volume 2 DVD, Aaron Beierle of DVD Talk stated "Often brilliant, extremely witty and darkly hilarious, Family Guy was unfortunately cancelled after Fox bumped it around six or seven different time slots. Although this third season wasn't as consistent as the first two, it's still hilarious and fans of the show should definitely pick up this terrific set."
