= Behind the Music =

Television series

- Title card from 1997–2000
- Also known as: VH1's Behind the Music
- Created by: Jeff Gaspin; Gay Rosenthal
- Narrated by: Jim Forbes
- Country of origin: United States
- No. of seasons: 17
- No. of episodes: 259

Production
- Executive producers: Gay Rosenthal; Jeff Gaspin; George Moll
- Running time: 60–90 minutes
- Production companies: Gay Rosenthal Productions; Paramount Television (select episodes)

Original release
- Network: VH1
- Release: August 17, 1997 – July 16, 2014

Related
- BTM2; Behind the Music Remastered; Behind the Music (2021 series)

Behind the Music is an American documentary television series that initially aired on VH1 from 1997 to 2014. Each episode profiles and interviews a popular musical artist or group, examining career beginnings, roads to success and any resultant hardships.

== Premise ==
Each show focuses on a musician or musical group, documenting both the successes of the musicians and the problems they faced during their careers. Except for the first two episodes (which focused on Milli Vanilli and MC Hammer), all programs are narrated by Jim Forbes. Forbes was later used to narrate the Milli Vanilli episode when it was modified to include the death of Rob Pilatus. The British airings of the episodes focusing on Thin Lizzy, Aerosmith and Genesis were narrated by Mary Anne Hobbs while Forbes narrated the American airings.

VH1's criterion for choosing the musicians who appear on the show is, in many cases, to profile those who are no longer in the music industry, or were moderately significant in rock history (although many are in the Rock and Roll Hall of Fame such as Neil Diamond, The Police, Metallica, AC/DC, Aerosmith among others). This is different to VH1's other biography show, VH1's Legends, which profiles musicians who were very significant to the industry. Some artists were profiled on Behind the Music and Legends, including Tina Turner, Elton John, Keith Moon, and John Lennon (Behind the Music exclusively focused on the months before his 1980 murder).

== Production ==
While being interviewed by Rolling Stone in October 2000, co-creator and executive producer Gay Rosenthal explained "Jeff Gaspin, who's the executive vice president of VH1, and I were at lunch, and we said, 'Whatever happened to Milli Vanilli?' I said, 'I don't know, but why don't you let me take the ball and run with it, and let me see what I can find out?' Milli Vanilli was hard. Nobody knew where they were. I had to be a private eye. I got a list of addresses where Fabrice had lived and sent letters to every address. Two weeks later, I got a call from Fabrice's manager. And then I spent a good two months with them – having dinner, having them at my house – before they agreed to do it. They didn't know if they wanted to relive the story, but I said, 'Listen, no one has heard your story from you. This will be a great opportunity to set the record straight.'" "When we saw it in the edit room, we thought we had something special. The stories were working, and the series was green-lit." Rosenthal later stated in an August 1999 interview with The Philadelphia Inquirer.

== Spin-offs and revival ==
Another episode of Behind the Music on Kiss was re-christened KISS: Beyond the Makeup in July 2001 (which was two hours in length). This featured Matt Pinfield, formerly of MTV's 120 Minutes, as narrator instead of Jim Forbes.

In June 2000, VH1 aired the BBC produced Behind the Music like program on Pink Floyd entitled Behind the Wall which coincided with the release of Is There Anybody Out There? The Wall Live 1980-81 and focused on the making of The Wall, concerts that went with it and Pink Floyd The Wall film and had interviews with the band members and it featured no narration.

A short-lived half-hour spin-off series titled BTM2 (short for Behind the Music 2), chronicled the careers of newer upcoming artists.

The spin-off Behind the Music Remastered that aired on VH1 Classic updates the original version of the Behind the Music episodes with new interviews, footage, and the later half of the artist's career. The series also included two original episodes on Motörhead and Deep Purple.

In September 2020, a spin-off known as MTV's Behind the Music: The Top 40 was announced for Paramount+, which was to feature a countdown of the 40 "biggest artists of all-time". In March 2021, it was revealed via a promo aired during the Grammy Awards that the spin-off would instead be positioned as a full reboot of Behind the Music, seven years after the original series' last episode aired on July 16, 2014. In May 2021, it was announced that the revival would premiere on July 29, 2021, with two episodes. Similar to Behind the Music Remastered, it also includes updated versions of episodes from the original series.

== Musicians ==
The following is a list of artists who have appeared in episodes of the series:

- 50 Cent (revisited in 2013; remastered in 2024)
- Aaliyah (revisited in 2012)
- AC/DC
- Trace Adkins
- Aerosmith
- Christina Aguilera (remastered in 2021)
- Akon
- Jason Aldean
- The Animals
- Anthrax (remastered in 2011)
- Backstreet Boys
- Bad Company (remastered in 2013)
- Badfinger
- The Bangles (remastered in 2022)
- Barenaked Ladies
- Fantasia Barrino
- Bay City Rollers
- Bel Biv DeVoe
- Pat Benatar (remastered in 2011)
- The Black Crowes
- Mary J. Blige
- Blind Melon
- Blondie (remastered in 2012)
- Blues Traveler
- Bon Jovi
- Sonny Bono
- Boyz II Men (remastered in 2022)
- Brandy
- Toni Braxton
- Bobby Brown (remastered in 2024)
- Lindsey Buckingham
- Glen Campbell
- Mariah Carey
- The Carpenters
- David Cassidy
- Harry Chapin
- Cher
- Chicago
- Joe Cocker
- Natalie Cole
- Sean Combs
- Alice Cooper (remastered in 2010)
- Creed
- Jim Croce
- David Crosby
- Sheryl Crow
- The Cult
- Deep Purple (second original Behind the Music: Remastered episode)
- Def Leppard (remastered in 2010)
- John Denver
- Depeche Mode
- Neil Diamond
- Celine Dion
- DMX (remastered in 2022)
- Snoop Dogg
- The Doobie Brothers
- Dr. Dre
- Duran Duran (remastered in 2010 & 21)
- Missy Elliott
- Gloria Estefan (remastered in 2022)
- Melissa Etheridge
- Eve
- Everclear
- Marianne Faithfull
- Fat Joe
- Fleetwood Mac (remastered in 2010)
- Foreigner (remastered in 2013)
- Peter Frampton
- Alan Freed
- The Game
- Garbage
- Leif Garrett (remastered in 2010 & 22)
- Gloria Gaynor
- Genesis (remastered in 2010)
- Boy George & Culture Club (remastered in 2010 & 22)
- Andy Gibb
- The Go-Go's (remastered in 2012)
- Goo Goo Dolls
- Grand Funk Railroad
- Green Day (remastered in 2010)
- Guns N' Roses
- Gym Class Heroes
- Hall & Oates (remastered in 2010 & 22)
- MC Hammer
- Heart (remastered in 2010)
- Faith Hill
- Hootie and the Blowfish (remastered in 2022)
- Jennifer Hudson
- Michael Hutchence (remastered in 2010)
- Ice Cube
- Ice-T (remastered in 2024)
- Billy Idol
- Rick James (remastered in 2011)
- Jan and Dean
- Jefferson Airplane
- Billy Joel
- Elton John
- Quincy Jones
- Journey
- Judas Priest (remastered in 2010)
- KC and the Sunshine Band
- Kid Rock
- Gladys Knight
- Lenny Kravitz
- Nick Lachey
- Adam Lambert
- Miranda Lambert
- Queen Latifah
- Cyndi Lauper
- John Lennon (Titled "John Lennon: The Last Years"; remastered in 2010 under the title "John Lennon: The Last Years and the Legacy")
- Julian Lennon
- Huey Lewis and the News (remastered in 2021)
- Jerry Lee Lewis
- LL Cool J (remastered in 2021)
- Jennifer Lopez (remastered in 2022)
- Courtney Love
- Ludacris
- Lynyrd Skynyrd (remastered in 2010)
- Remy Ma
- Madonna (featured in 1998; continued in 2001)
- The Mamas & the Papas
- Bob Marley (remastered in 2022)
- Ricky Martin (revisited in 2011; remastered 2021; remastered version aired as premiere episode in the revival)
- Matchbox Twenty
- Meat Loaf (remastered in 2010)
- Megadeth (remastered in 2011)
- John Mellencamp
- Metallica (remastered in 2010)
- George Michael (remastered in 2022)
- Bret Michaels (remastered in 2021)
- Bette Midler
- Milli Vanilli (premiere episode; later updated; remastered in 2024)
- The Monkees
- Keith Moon
- Alanis Morissette (remastered in 2022)
- Mötley Crüe (remastered in 2010 & 22)
- Motörhead (the first all-original Behind the Music: Remastered episode)
- Nas
- Nelly
- Ne-Yo
- Ricky Nelson
- Willie Nelson
- New Edition
- New Kids on the Block (remastered in 2021)
- Stevie Nicks
- No Doubt
- The Notorious B.I.G. (revisited in 2012; remastered in 2024)
- Ted Nugent (one of two episodes ever to have a viewer warning; remastered in 2012)
- Oasis
- Sinéad O'Connor (remastered in 2024)
- Tony Orlando
- Ozzy Osbourne
- Donny & Marie Osmond
- Pantera (the second episode to have a viewer warning; remastered in 2013)
- The Partridge Family
- Teddy Pendergrass
- Linda Perry (final episode in the original series)
- Tom Petty
- Pink (revisited in 2012; remastered in 2022)
- Pitbull
- Poison (remastered in 2010)
- The Police
- Iggy Pop
- Public Enemy
- Quiet Riot
- Bonnie Raitt
- Ratt
- Red Hot Chili Peppers
- R.E.M.
- REO Speedwagon
- Busta Rhymes
- Lionel Richie
- Robbie Robertson
- Run-D.M.C.
- Salt-N-Pepa
- Nicole Scherzinger
- Selena
- Brian Setzer
- Frank Sinatra (half-hour retrospective that aired on the day of his death in 1998)
- Britney Spears
- Spice Girls
- Rick Springfield
- Steppenwolf
- Cat Stevens
- Rod Stewart
- Sting
- Styx (remastered in 2012)
- Sublime
- Donna Summer
- Thin Lizzy (remastered in 2013)
- T.I.
- Tiffany
- TLC (continued in 2004; remastered in 2011 & 22)
- Peter Tosh
- T-Pain
- Train
- Tina Turner
- Shania Twain (remastered in 2022)
- Twisted Sister (remastered in 2013)
- Carrie Underwood
- Usher
- Wolfgang Van Halen
- Vanilla Ice
- Lil Wayne
- Barry White
- "Weird Al" Yankovic (remastered in 2010)

== Years, events and non-musicians ==
Other than musicians, some episodes were documentaries on musical events, films, and non-musicians who were influential on the music world. The following appeared in episodes of the series:

- 1968
- 1970
- 1972
- 1975
- 1977
- 1981
- 1984
- 1987
- 1992
- 1994
- 1999
- 2000
- Flashdance
- Alan Freed
- The Day the Music Died
- Grease
- Hair
- Lilith Fair
- The Rocky Horror Picture Show
- Saturday Night Fever
- Russell Simmons
- Studio 54
- Woodstock 1969

== Similar VH1 programs ==
The following is a list of artists who have appeared in VH1 TV programs similar in format to Behind the Music but are not officially part of the series:

- Chris Gaines (titled Behind the Life of Chris Gaines as it was a fictional artist played by Garth Brooks)
- Kiss (renamed KISS: Beyond the Makeup, 90 minutes in length)
- Pink Floyd (titled Pink Floyd: Behind the Wall, 50-minute documentary made in 2000 on The Wall album)

== Reception ==
=== Accolades ===
- Behind the Music was nominated for five Primetime Emmy Awards including the Outstanding Non-Fiction Series category for four constitutive years (2000–2003).
- In 1999, the series won an ALMA Award for Outstanding Made-for-Television Documentary for the episode featuring Selena and in 2001, Behind the Music won a TV Guide Award for Music Series of the Year.
- Behind the Music episodes received multiple nominations including a GLAAD Media Award nomination for Outstanding Film (Documentary) in 1998 for the episode featuring Boy George as well as multiple Image Awards for episodes featuring Tina Turner and Bob Marley.

== In popular culture ==
Film

- In the 2001 film Josie and the Pussycats, it is explained that Behind the Music was created as a result of how bands are "dealt with" if they discover the fact, they are involved in the government's subliminal message program.

Music

- The band Steel Panther released a fictitious episode about themselves that featured Dave Navarro, Dee Snider, Jani Lane, and Kat Von D, among others.
- "Weird Al" Yankovic mentioned the Lynyrd Skynyrd episode in his song "Trapped in the Drive-Thru".

Television

- Adult Swim's Robot Chicken did a skit where the Muppet band, Dr. Teeth and the Electric Mayhem, was profiled on Behind the Music.
- The Family Guy episode "Herpe the Love Sore" begins with Peter and Lois watching an episode of Behind the Music about the Electric Mayhem.
- In the made-for-television film A Diva's Christmas Carol starring Vanessa L. Williams, the character of Ebony * Scrooge watches her own episode near the end. This episode, filling the role as the Ghost of Christmas Yet to Come, chronicles the life and tragic death in an ominous manner to force Ebony to change her ways.
- In the Duck Dodgers episode "In Space, No One Can Hear You Rock", Dodgers plays a recorded episode of "Behind the Metal" about Dave Mustaine which is a parody of the Megadeth episode of "Behind the Music".
- In the Family Guy episode "The Thin White Line", Brian explains to his psychiatrist: "You wanna know how pathetic my life is?" I've seen that 'Behind the Music' with Leif Garrett eighteen times." A subsequent cutaway gag is shown with a briefly shown animated recreation of the episode and then cuts to Brian on the couch lip-synching to the dialogue.
- In the Friends episode "The One with the Joke", Chandler tells Joey: "Dude, you have got to turn on Behind the Music. The band Heart is having a really tough time, and I think they may break up."
- An episode of The Man Show showed a parody of Behind the Music with the band Korn, called "Beneath the Music". It showed the two hosts as ex-members of the band but later being kicked out because of their antics.
- A late episode of Mystery Science Theater 3000 features a skit parodying Behind the Music about an unnamed band featured in that episode's movie, Track of the Moon Beast; the writers christened them "The Band That Played 'California Lady'", after the apparent title of the song they performed in the film.
- Saturday Night Live's "More Cowbell" sketch was a fictitious episode profiling Blue Öyster Cult. SNL would go on to do various skits that parodied BTM including Fat Albert, "The Super Bowl Shuffle", Joan Jett, "Rock and Roll Heaven", John Oates, and Colin Hay.
- An episode of Conan aired a parody of Behind the Music featuring the Star Wars Cantina Band.
- The show was parodied on the South Park episode "Terrance and Phillip: Behind the Blow" as well as in the episode "Chef Aid: Behind the Menu", which also featured Jim Forbes as narrator.
- On the show Still Standing, Bill Miller and his sister-in-law's new boyfriend sit in a bar and watch part of an episode of Behind the Music.
- An episode of What's New, Scooby-Doo? had a spoof of the show, called "Rewind the Music".
- An episode of The Simpsons entitled "Behind the Laughter" was done in the style of "Behind the Music". It even used the show's theme music and narrator.
- The sixteenth episode of the fourth season of The Jamie Foxx Show had a spoof of the show, called "Behind the Jingle".
- In the fifteenth episode of the eighth season of How I Met Your Mother, "P.S. I Love You", a parody of Behind the Music was used, named Underneath the Tunes, about the transformation of Robin Sparkles into Robin Daggers.
- Behind the Music was one of the programs which was discussed on I Love the '90s: Part Deux.

Online

- The show is also the base for the running parody Behind the Music that Sucks, which has been produced by Internet humor site Heavy.com since 1998.
- The flash animation collaboration based on the Super Mario franchise, Bowser's Kingdom on Newgrounds.com parodied Behind the Music in the tenth episode "Bowser's Kingdom: Behind the Kingdom".
- In order to promote his full-length film, internet comedian Stuart Ashen released a parody called Behind the Tat.

Advertising

- A Chex Mix campaign featuring The Backstreet Boys entitled "Sound Checks- The Story of Snackstreet" borrows heavily from the Behind the Music format.
