= 3 Acts of God =

- Family Guy episode
- Episode no.: Season 12; Episode 13
- Directed by: Bob Bowen
- Written by: Alec Sulkin
- Production code: AACX17
- Original air date: March 16, 2014

Guest appearances
- Adam Carolla as Death; Emily Osment as Carrie Underwood; C.J. Spiller as himself; Mario Williams as himself; Christine Lakin as Sarah Palin (Uncredited, deleted scenes)

Episode chronology
← Previous "Mom's the Word"	Next → "Fresh Heir"
- Family Guy season 12

"3 Acts of God" is the thirteenth episode of the twelfth season of the animated comedy series Family Guy and the 223rd episode overall. It aired on Fox in the United States on March 16, 2014, and is written by Alec Sulkin and directed by Bob Bowen. In the episode, Peter is sick of opposing football teams thanking God for beating the Patriots, so he and the guys go on a quest to find the Lord and ask him to stop determining the outcomes of football games.

== Plot ==
The Griffins and their friends, including Cleveland, tailgate at the New England Patriots game at Gillette Stadium vs. the rival Buffalo Bills. However, at the end of the game, the Patriots blow their chance to win and lose their 10th straight game. At The Drunken Clam, Peter, Quagmire, Cleveland, and Joe angrily discuss the missed chance. During a postgame interview, Bills players C. J. Spiller and Mario Williams (voiced by themselves) attribute their win to God and Peter proposes they find and confront God about messing with their games.

Starting at a church, Cleveland enters in the style of Sherman Hemsley in Amen, but exits stating that there is a baby's funeral inside. They move on to Nashville, Tennessee to seek out Carrie Underwood, who attributes her success to God, but she doesn't know where God lives. Taking things to the extreme, they travel to Greece where they hope to run into success with the Greek Gods on Mount Olympus. They meet Chronos, the Titan of Time, on Mount Olympus, but he just gives Peter a gift basket and tells them the current time. Moving on to Israel, they find everyone is like Mort Goldman. In India, they decide that conditions are not fitting for God (including a theater where Aziz Ansari is performing) and leave. Back home at the Drunken Clam, Death stops in for The Cleveland Show and takes them on to visit God.

In Heaven, God meets them personally and Peter tells Him to quit causing the Patriots to lose, which God blames on coach Bill Belichick for not smiling. He agrees to give the Patriots a break if they make Belichick smile. Their attempt to make him smile is met with stiff resistance until he laughs at Joe's condition, and they finally succeed in persuading God to leave the Patriots alone, and God then tells Peter that he has a message from Conway Twitty, stating that Twitty just wants Peter to do a joke instead of a cutaway. Lois states to Peter that he should have asked more from God, Peter states that he did ask God something else; Meg starts to fade from existence.

== Reception ==
Kevin McFarland of The A.V. Club gave the episode a B, saying: "'3 Acts of God' certainly has its moments where it touches the third rail and feels like Family Guy giving into its worst tendencies. Those brief scenes in Jerusalem and India specifically feel unnecessarily mean, as well as the final joke of what else Peter asked God about besides the Patriots. But more cutaways landed than many of the episodes I reviewed over the last two seasons, which made for a surprisingly pleasant visit back to Seth MacFarlane's main gig."

The episode received a 2.3 rating in the 18–49 years old demographic and was watched by a total of 4.62 million people. This made it the most watched show on Animation Domination that night, beating American Dad!, Bob's Burgers and The Simpsons.

A writer in the Israeli newspaper Haaretz claimed that a scene in the episode was evidence of long-held antisemitism by MacFarlane.
