= Bills–Patriots rivalry =

National Football League rivalry

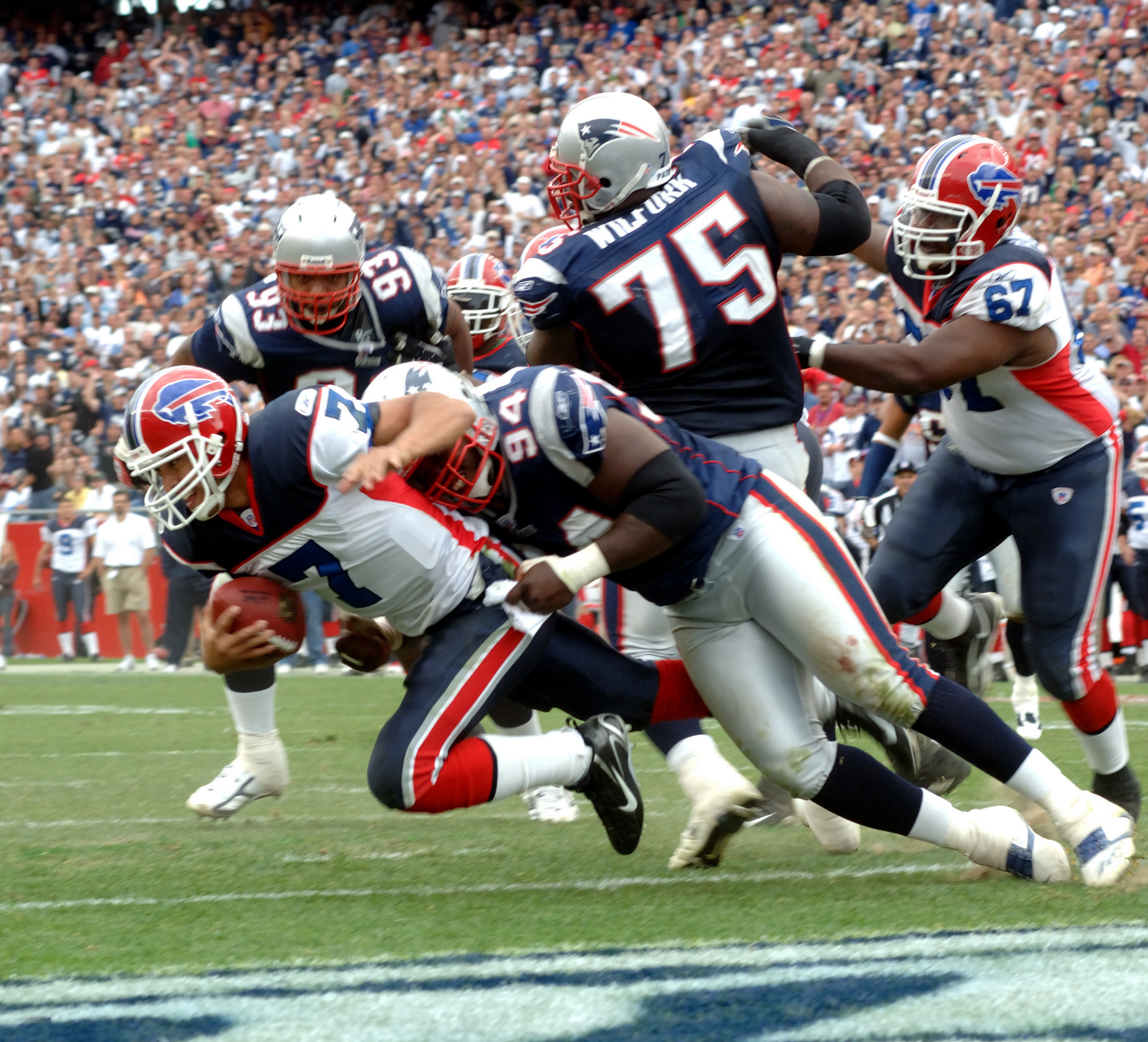
- Bills and Patriots face off during the 2006 season.

- Buffalo Bills New England Patriots
- Location: Buffalo, Boston
- First meeting: September 23, 1960; Bills 13, Patriots 0
- Latest meeting: October 4, 2026; Patriots 29, Bills 26
- Next meeting: December 6, 2026
- Stadiums: Bills: Highmark Stadium; Patriots: Gillette Stadium

Statistics
- Total meetings: 134
- All-time series: Patriots: 81–52–1
- Regular season series: Patriots: 80–51–1
- Postseason results: Tied: 1–1
- Largest victory: Bills: 45–10 (1970); Patriots: 56–10 (2007)
- Most points scored: Bills: 47 (2021); Patriots: 56 (2007)
- Longest win streak: Bills: 9 (1971–1975); Patriots: 15 (2003–2010)
- Current win streak: Patriots: 1 (2026–present)

Post-season history
- 1963 AFL Eastern Division: Patriots won: 26–8; 2021 AFC Wild Card: Bills won: 47–17

The Bills–Patriots rivalry is a National Football League (NFL) rivalry between the Buffalo Bills and New England Patriots.

Both teams are members of the East division of the American Football Conference (AFC) and play two games against each other annually. The series debuted in 1960 when both were charter members of the American Football League (AFL). The two clubs have combined for seventeen AFL or AFC championships, the most of any two teams in the AFC East. (Note: Eleven for the Patriots and six for the Bills, followed by five for the Dolphins and one for the Jets.) In addition, either the Patriots or Bills have won the AFC East division in 28 out of 35 seasons since 1988. (Note: Nineteen for the Patriots and nine for the Bills, followed by four for the Dolphins, two for the Jets, and one for the Colts before leaving the division in 2002.)

The rivalry has traditionally been a very competitive one (41–38–1 at the close of the 20th century, in favor of New England) with the Patriots holding slight edges in the 1960s and 1980s, and the Bills with similar edges in the 1970s and 1990s. The series then became notable for its extreme lopsidedness during the New England career of quarterback Tom Brady, whose Patriots compiled a record of 32–3 (3–2 in the five games he missed) against the Bills in his two decades with the franchise (the 2000s and 2010s). Until January 2021 (when Josh Allen passed him) Brady had won more games at Highmark Stadium than any quarterback for Buffalo since 2001, and Brady beat the Bills more times in his New England career than any other team.

Buffalo is 9–5 against New England in the 2020s. The Bills dominated the Patriots, 47–17, in a wild card matchup of the 2021–22 NFL playoffs that was the first "perfect offensive game" (i.e., scoring touchdowns on every drive with no punts, kicks, or turnovers) by any team in NFL history. This was the first playoff game in the series since the two franchises joined the NFL in 1970; in their AFL days, Gino Cappelletti kicked four field goals en route to a 26–8 Boston Patriots victory to break their tie of identical regular season records in 1963.

The Patriots lead the overall series, 81–52–1. The two teams have met twice in the playoffs, winning one each.

== NFL record games ==
=== Single-game rushing record ===
On September 16, 1973, O. J. Simpson of the Bills broke the all-time professional football single-game rushing record in this rivalry game against the Patriots. Simpson rushed for 250 yards, breaking the record set by Willie Ellison of the Rams in 1971. In the same game, Simpson became the all-time leading rusher for the Bills franchise, and was described after the game as having "more yardage than Secretariat" by Patriots linebacker Edgar Chandler. Chuck Fairbanks, coaching his first game for the Patriots, described Simpson looking "like Grant going through Richmond." Fullback Larry Watkins also rushed for over 100 yards for the Bills, as the team racked up 360 rushing yards for the game. The Bills defeated the Patriots by a score of 31–13.

=== The perfect offensive game ===
The Bills dominated the Patriots in this rivalry's first playoff game in over 58 years, their first as NFL teams, and their first after the Boston Patriots changed their location name to New England, by a score of 47–17 in the wild card round of the 2021–22 NFL playoffs. This went into record books as the first "Perfect Offensive Game" by any NFL team as the Bills, led by Josh Allen, scored touchdowns on every drive of the entire game without any punts, kicks, or turnovers. Allen threw more touchdowns than incomplete passes as the Bills gained 480 yards on just 51 snaps. USA Today remarked the game "served as another reminder that the Bills own the AFC East in these post-Tom Brady years", while Patriots linebacker Matthew Judon observed that "it wasn’t one drive, one play or one single player. It was everything. It was the whole game." Bills defensive tackle Harrison Phillips opined the game's statistics sounded "like some Pop Warner stuff." It was Patriots' second-worst loss of the 21st century, the three worst of which were all suffered in the Bills–Patriots rivalry.

== History ==
=== 1960–1969: The AFL days ===
The Bills and Patriots played for the first time in a preseason game during the first season of the American Football League on July 30, 1960. The game was played at War Memorial Stadium in Buffalo, and the Patriots won the game 28–7. The teams met for their first regular season game during Week 3 of the inaugural season of the American Football League in 1960. The game was played at Nickerson Field at Boston University on Friday, September 23, 1960. The Bills scored a touchdown in each of the first two quarters and shut the Patriots out 13–0.

The two teams met for their first playoff match in the AFL divisional game in December 1963. The Patriots won 26–8. In this game, Jack Kemp played quarterback for the Bills and Gino Cappelletti made four field goals and two extra points to help lift the Patriots to victory.

Throughout the remainder of the decade, the teams would complete a 12–9 record in favor of the Patriots. The Bills won the AFL championship game in 1964 and 1965 and won the division in 1966. The Patriots lost to the San Diego Chargers in their only AFL championship appearance in 1963.

=== 1970–1979: Post-merger and O. J. Simpson ===
Both teams were placed into the AFC East after the AFL–NFL merger. The Bills sustained a winning streak of 9 games from 1971 to 1975. The two teams played a pair of highly competitive games in the 1974 season. The Bills withstood a late Patriots rally at Rich Stadium to win, 30–28. Two weeks later, the Bills edged the Patriots, 29–28, when a last-second field goal attempt by the Patriots was blocked.

Two years after his NFL record rushing game in this rivalry against the Pats, Simpson again had one of the most dramatic games of his career on November 23, 1975, against the Patriots. Simpson scored four touchdowns (including two passes from Joe Ferguson) as the Bills won, 45–31. Patriots rookie Steve Grogan threw for 365 yards and two touchdowns but was intercepted three times.

1976 was Simpson's final year in Buffalo; on October 24 Simpson rushed for 110 yards and two touchdowns in a 26–22 Patriots win. Two weeks later, on November 7, Simpson was held to just eight rushing yards before being ejected following a scuffle at midfield; Patriots rookie Mike Haynes ran back a second quarter punt 89 yards for a touchdown, the first such touchdown in Patriots history. The Patriots won the game, 20–10, completing their first season sweep of the Bills since 1968.

The Bills would go on to win the decade, 12–8.

=== 1980–1989 ===
The 1980s was a better decade for the Patriots, as they won the decade series 13–6. The Patriots also completed their own 11-game winning streak over the Bills from January 1983 to September 1988. The Bills began to rebuild their team in the late 1980s with the additions of Jim Kelly at quarterback, Thurman Thomas as running back, Andre Reed as a receiver, Bruce Smith on defense, and Marv Levy as coach. The Bills bested the Patriots to win the AFC East division four years in a row from 1988 to 1992. During the final stretch of the 1980s, the Bills took three out of four meetings with the Patriots.

=== 1990–1999: Kelly and Flutie vs. Bledsoe ===
The Bills would regain their edge in this decade, winning it 12–8. In the 1990 season, the Bills reached the Super Bowl for the first time, in Super Bowl XXV.

The Bills continued to dominate the Patriots in the early 1990s, winning eight of the first nine games, including five straight. New England, however, made the rivalry more competitive with the addition of Drew Bledsoe as quarterback and the hiring of Parcells as head coach. The Bills also saw many of their Super Bowl players leave during this time period. By the end of the 1990s, the Bills led the decade with 12 wins to the Patriots' 8 wins. Throughout the decade, the two teams combined to win the AFC East six times, with the Patriots reaching the Super Bowl in 1996 and the Bills reaching the Super Bowl in 1990, 1991, 1992, and 1993.

The decade saw several memorable games between the two. On September 11, 1994, Buffalo led 28–14 at the half and 35–21 at the start of the fourth quarter after Mike Lodish grabbed a Patriots fumble at the New England goalline. The Patriots scored two touchdowns to tie the game, but Buffalo won 38–35 after Steve Christie booted a 32-yard field goal as time expired.

Late that season the Bills hosted the Patriots. Buffalo was 7–7 while the Patriots were 8–6. The Patriots erased a 17–3 gap by scoring 38 unanswered points. Frank Reich, replacing Jim Kelly, was intercepted twice and the Bills fumbled three times; Ricky Reynolds ran back a Buffalo fumble for a touchdown. The 41–17 Patriots win eliminated Buffalo from the playoffs.

1996 was Jim Kelly's last season; his Bills won 17–10 on September 8 on a 63-yard touchdown throw to Quinn Early and then on a last-second goal line stand. On October 27, the Bills had an 18–15 lead at the two-minute warning; Curtis Martin ran in a ten-yard score, then Willie McGinest intercepted Kelly and ran in a 46-yard touchdown, but Kelly then completed a 48-yard touchdown off two Patriots defenders to Andre Reed; the onside kick failed and the Patriots won 28–25.

The 1998 season saw the return of Doug Flutie, who'd been Patriots quarterback in 1988–89; he replaced Rob Johnson as Bills quarterback after Buffalo started 1–3. Flutie led the Bills to win four of his first five starts, including a 13–10 victory over the Patriots at Rich Stadium on November 15. However, on November 29 in Flutie's return to Foxboro Stadium, the Patriots, despite a broken index finger for Drew Bledsoe, rallied to a controversial last-second touchdown to Ben Coates and a 25–21 Patriots win that was aided by a pass interference penalty against the Bills as time expired. The play was set up by what had appeared to be a failed 4th-down conversion by the Patriots, as Bills defenders alleged the referees had said "just give it to him". The Bills players and staff were so upset that they walked off the field in protest before the PAT attempt, prompting Patriots coach Pete Carroll to go for two.

=== 2000–2009: The Tom Brady era, Part I ===
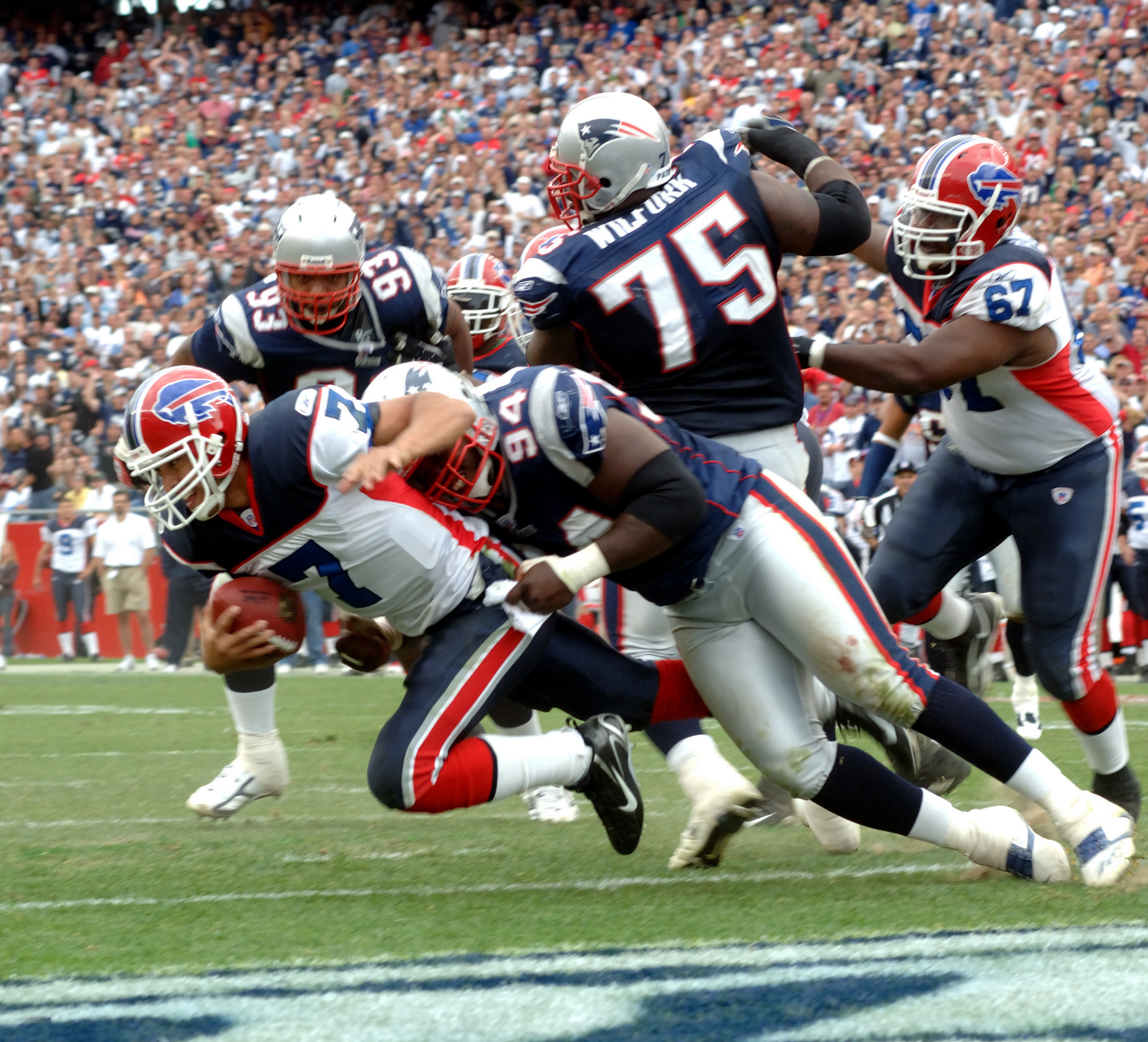
Bills QB J. P. Losman gets tackled by New England's Ty Warren for the Patriots' game-winning safety in 2006

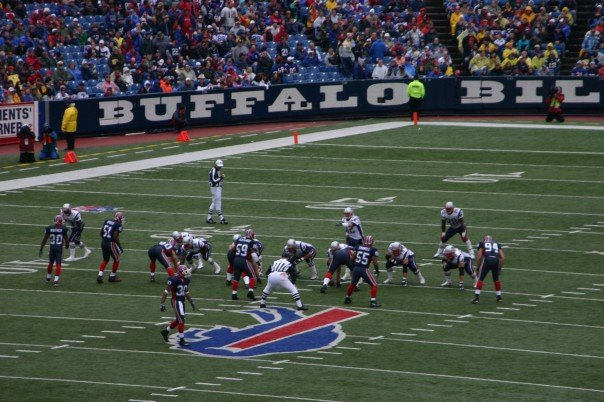
QB Tom Brady commanding the Patriots offense against the Bills in 2006

The 2000s was the most lopsided decade for the rivalry to date. On November 5, 2000, Flutie and the Bills defeated the Patriots and new head coach Bill Belichick at Foxboro Stadium 16–13 in overtime. But after this the Patriots won 18 of the next 19 against the Bills.

This decade also saw several notable personnel changes. Following New England's 2001 championship year, Drew Bledsoe was traded by New England to Buffalo in 2002. Lawyer Milloy was then cut after the 2003 preseason and was immediately signed by Buffalo. Doug Flutie, released by the Bills after 2000, joined the Patriots by way of the San Diego Chargers in 2005.

The Patriots assembled a five-game winning streak over the Bills in the beginning of the decade, which was snapped when Buffalo defeated the Patriots 31–0 in 2003. However, the Patriots then defeated the Bills by the same score later in the season. That win began a 15-game winning streak for the Patriots against the Bills stretching through 2010. The Bills did come close to winning on two occasions, but lost both times due to fourth quarter gaffes, surrendering a safety in 2006 to lose 19–17, and fumbling a kickoff return to set up New England's game-winning touchdown in 2009.

On December 28, 2008, the 10–5 Patriots needed a win and help from other teams to win the AFC East, while the 7–8 Bills were wrapping up the ninth straight season without a playoff berth. Played with severe wind gusts that required stadium officials to use ropes to keep the goalposts from swaying, the game was a 13–0 Patriots win as Matt Cassel, subbing for injured Tom Brady, threw only eight passes. However, the Patriots fell short of the division title.

=== 2010–2019: The Tom Brady era, Part II ===
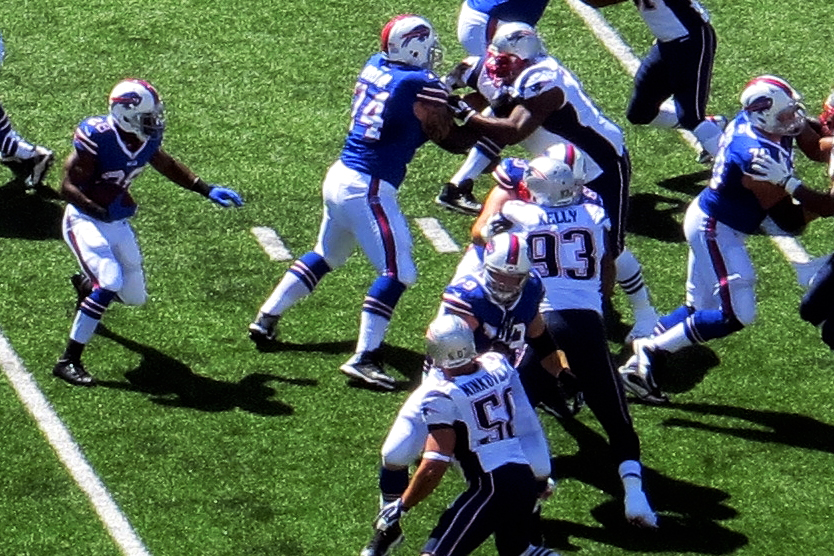
Bills RB C. J. Spiller rushing against the Patriots in 2013

The game on September 26, 2010, was noteworthy on several levels. The Patriots won 38–30, marking the 400th win in the history of the Patriots franchise (regular-season and playoffs). It was first start of the season for Buffalo's former backup quarterback Ryan Fitzpatrick. Randy Moss caught two touchdowns; they turned out to be his last with the Patriots.

On September 25, 2011, the Bills came back from a 21–0 deficit to defeat the Patriots 34–31 and snap the Patriots' 15-game winning streak. Despite this win, the Patriots won the final meeting of the season, on January 1, 2012, erasing a 21–0 Bills lead to win 49–21

On September 30, 2012, the Patriots erased a 21–7 Bills lead in the third quarter by outscoring them, 45–7 on six straight touchdowns, winning 52–28. On November 11, 2012, the Bills stayed toe-to-toe with the Patriots; down, 37–31, the Bills were driving until Devin McCourty intercepted a Fitzpatrick pass in the endzone.

Following the death of long time Bills owner Ralph Wilson, the Bills were sold to Buffalo Sabres owners Terry Pegula and his wife Kim. In his first game as Bills owner the Bills team hosted the Patriots on October 12, 2014, a 37–22 Patriots win. Tom Brady threw for 361 yards - his 60th 300-yard game - and four touchdowns, including a 43-yard strike to Brian Tyms. In Week 17, the Bills won their first matchup at Gillette Stadium since the facility's construction. It was Buffalo's first regulation win in New England in over 20 years. Having clinched home field advantage throughout the playoffs, the Patriots only played Brady during the first half of the game before replacing him with Jimmy Garoppolo in the second half. Neither quarterback found the endzone in the 17–9 Buffalo win.

After the 2014 season, Buffalo hired former New York Jets head coach Rex Ryan. When asked if the Jets would be his focus during the 2015 season, Ryan admitted that the Patriots would still be his number one target.

2016 saw the Patriots hosting the Bills in week 4. The Patriots faced a shortage at quarterback, as Tom Brady was suspended in the aftermath of the Deflategate scandal and primary backup Jimmy Garoppolo was sidelined with an injury. As a result, third-string quarterback Jacoby Brissett made the start for the Patriots. Unable to overcome a strong defensive showing from the Bills and an efficient performance by quarterback Tyrod Taylor, Brissett and the Patriots lost 16–0. It was the first shutout loss at home for New England since 1993. During the rematch later that season, in which the Patriots won 41–25 with Brady's return, a spectator notoriously tossed a sex toy onto the field in the middle of a play, starting a trend that would carry on in subsequent seasons.

During a game with playoff implications on December 3, 2017, Patriots tight end and Buffalo native Rob Gronkowski hit Bills cornerback Tre'Davious White with a flying elbow after White intercepted Tom Brady in garbage-time. Though the game was already decided at that point with the Patriots going on to win 23–3, the play added tension between the teams. During the rematch just three weeks later, Buffalo raced to a 16–13 lead in the third quarter, but ultimately lost 37–16 as Brady led three consecutive touchdown drives. Another controversial moment occurred when Bills receiver Kelvin Benjamin had a touchdown reception overturned during the second quarter.

In a game reminiscent of the first Bills–Patriots game of 2011, the two teams met at New Era Field in September 2019 with undefeated records and the division lead on the line. However, the game was a defensive struggle as opposed to an offensive shootout, with both Tom Brady and Bills quarterback Josh Allen being held to under 153 passing yards apiece. The Patriots emerged victorious after holding an early 13–0 lead, which proved too much for Buffalo to overcome due to numerous turnovers and Allen leaving the game in the fourth quarter due to injury. The final score was 16–10 in favor of New England. The two teams again met later in the season on a Saturday NFL Network Special with the division title on the line; as with the first matchup, the final result was within one touchdown's score, with the Patriots prevailing 24–17 after the Patriots staged a successful goal-line stand in the closing minutes of the game. (Both teams had already clinched a wild-card bid at minimum.) This would be Brady's final win as a Patriot, as the Patriots lost their final regular season game to the Miami Dolphins and were eliminated from the playoffs a week later in a Wild Card round loss to the Tennessee Titans; Brady, who was said by USA Today Sports to make Bills fans "cringe when they hear his name" and called the "creator of Buffalo nightmares" by Yahoo Sports, signed with the Tampa Bay Buccaneers in free agency during the offseason. His record of 32–3 against the Bills while with the Patriots was called simply "ridiculous" by Sports Illustrated.

=== 2020–present: The Josh Allen/post-Brady era ===
The current decade has begun in favor of the Bills, who hold a 9–4 edge including a historic playoff domination of the Patriots in January 2022.

In the first game of this new decade, the two teams met at Bills Stadium on November 1, 2020. This game was yet another tightly contested game between the two opponents, with both teams opting to rely primarily on their run games. After a 28-yard field goal put the Bills up 24–21, the Patriots would drive down the field in the final minutes of the fourth quarter, reaching Buffalo's 19 yard line. However, the Bills recovered the football after the Patriots' new quarterback, Cam Newton, fumbled with 31 seconds left in the game, giving the Bills their first win over New England since 2016, breaking a 7-game winning streak for the Patriots in the series. Buffalo would go on to claim the division title in week 15, ending New England's streak of division titles at 11 years, an NFL-record. The two teams met again at Gillette Stadium in Foxborough later in the season. This game was dominated by the Bills, with Buffalo mostly relying on their passing game. Bills quarterback Josh Allen threw four touchdown passes as the Bills would go on to win 38–9, the worst loss of New England coach Bill Belichick's career up to that point. This marked the first time that the Bills swept the Patriots in the season series since the 1999 season. It stands as the worst home loss for the Patriots in the 21st century and the worst loss anywhere since the Bills defeated them 31–0 at home in 2003.

The following year, Buffalo and New England would find each other battling for the division lead throughout the season. During their first meeting on December 6, which was impacted by winds greater than 40 miles per hour, the Patriots only threw the ball 3 times with rookie quarterback Mac Jones, running the ball 46 times, including a 64-yard touchdown run by Damien Harris, as Buffalo opted to pass more. The Bills scored a touchdown on just one of their four redzone possessions, failing to score on their final two attempts and allowing New England to win 14–10. Buffalo won the week 16 rematch in New England 33–21, taking advantage of the normalized weather conditions as Allen passed for over 300 yards and 3 touchdowns. Jones, however, was held to less than 150 yards passing with two interceptions and 14 of 32 passes completed.

In 2022 came "The Perfect Offensive Game" by the Bills against the Patriots in the wild card round of the playoffs; the 47–17 loss was one of the three worst losses of the Patriots in the 21st century, all three of which were suffered at the hands of the Bills in this rivalry.

The 2022 season saw Buffalo easily defeat New England 24–10 in the game in Foxborough. In the second meeting in Buffalo, the Bills were playing their first game following the collapse of Damar Hamlin the previous game against the Bengals; because that game ended up being cancelled and the Kansas City Chiefs finished with a 14–3 record to clinch the AFC's #1 seed, Buffalo at 12–3 was no longer able to finish atop the conference, but did defeat New England 35–23, eliminating the Patriots from playoff contention after a series of close losses late in the season. The game was notable for Buffalo's Nyheim Hines returning two kickoffs for touchdowns, including on the opening kickoff the first play after Hamlin's hospitalization.

After another sweep by Buffalo during the 2022 regular season, New England upset the Bills in Foxboro with a 29–25 win, as Mac Jones, who had one of the best performances in his career, led a game-winning touchdown drive. The win was one of only a few for New England, which suffered its worst season since 1992. The Bills beat the Patriots 27–21 in the rematch in Buffalo thanks to several Patriots turnovers, clinching their fifth straight season with double-digit wins.

In 2025, the Patriots hired former linebacker and Tennessee Titans head coach Mike Vrabel as their head coach, in addition to signing former Bills receivers Stefon Diggs and Mack Hollins to revamp the receiving corps for second year quarterback Drake Maye. The Patriots upset the then-unbeaten Bills in their first meeting of the season 23–20 as the Bills gave up three turnovers. This was the second of ten straight wins for New England as they took the division lead. With a chance to clinch the division in week 15 by beating Buffalo, the Patriots climbed to a 24–7 halftime lead, at one point leading 21–0, behind a strong rushing attack led by TreVeyon Henderson, but Buffalo came back to win 35–31 behind strong performances by Allen, running back James Cook, and tight end Dawson Knox.

== Season-by-season results ==
Buffalo Bills vs. New England Patriots Season-by-Season Results
1960s (Patriots, 12–8–1)

| Season | Season series | at Buffalo Bills | at Boston Patriots | Overall series | Notes |
|---|---|---|---|---|---|
| 1960 | Bills 2–0 | Bills; 38–14 | Bills; 13–0 | Bills; 2–0 | Inaugural season for both franchises and the American Football League (AFL). Both teams are placed in the Eastern Division, resulting in two meetings annually. Bills' win in Boston is the franchise's first win. |
| 1961 | Patriots 2–0 | Patriots; 23–21 | Patriots; 52–21 | Tie; 2–2 | |
| 1962 | Patriots 1–0–1 | Tie; 28–28 | Patriots; 31–0 | Patriots; 3–2–1 | |
| 1963 | Tie 1–1 | Bills; 28–21 | Patriots; 17–7 | Patriots; 4–3–1 | Both teams finish with 7–6–1 records, setting up a tiebreaker playoff game. |
| 1963 Playoffs | Patriots 1–0 | Patriots; 26–8 | —N/a | Patriots; 5–3–1 | AFL Eastern Division Playoff. Patriots go on to lose 1963 AFL Championship Game. |
| 1964 | Tie 1–1 | Patriots; 36–28 | Bills; 24–14 | Patriots; 6–4–1 | Patriots' win handed the Bills their first loss of the season after a 9–0 start. It was also their only home loss that season. Bills win 1964 AFL Championship. |
| 1965 | Bills 2–0 | Bills; 24–7 | Bills; 23–7 | Tie; 6–6–1 | Bills win 1965 AFL Championship. |
| 1966 | Patriots 2–0 | Patriots; 20–10 | Patriots; 14–3 | Patriots; 8–6–1 | |
| 1967 | Tie 1–1 | Patriots; 23–0 | Bills; 44–16 | Patriots; 9–7–1 | Following their win, the Bills went on a 15-game road losing streak and 16-game road winless streak. |
| 1968 | Patriots 2–0 | Patriots; 16–7 | Patriots; 23–6 | Patriots; 11–7–1 | |
| 1969 | Tie 1–1 | Bills; 23–16 | Patriots; 35–21 | Patriots; 12–8–1 | |

1970s (Bills, 12–8)

| Season | Season series | at Buffalo Bills | at Boston/New England Patriots | Overall series | Notes |
|---|---|---|---|---|---|
| 1970 | Tie 1–1 | Patriots; 14–10 | Bills; 45–10 | Patriots; 13–9–1 | As a result of the AFL–NFL merger, the Bills and Patriots are placed in the AFC East. In Boston, Bills record their largest victory over the Patriots with a 35–point differential. Following their win, Bills went on a 13 game road losing streak and 14 game road winless streak. Patriots' win was their only road win in the 1970 season. |
| 1971 | Tie 1–1 | Bills; 27–20 | Patriots; 38–33 | Patriots; 14–10–1 | Patriots change their name to "New England Patriots" and open Schaefer Stadium (now known as Foxboro Stadium). Bills’ win ended their 17-game winless streak and 15-game losing streak. It was also their only win in the 1971 season. |
| 1972 | Bills 2–0 | Bills; 38–14 | Bills; 27–24 | Patriots; 14–12–1 | Last matchup at War Memorial Stadium. Bills win in New England snapped their 13-game road losing streak and 14-game road winless streak. |
| 1973 | Bills 2–0 | Bills; 37–13 | Bills; 31–13 | Tie; 14–14–1 | Bills open Rich Stadium (later known as "old" Highmark Stadium). In New England, Bills' RB O. J. Simpson breaks the single-game rushing record. |
| 1974 | Bills 2–0 | Bills; 30–28 | Bills; 29–28 | Bills; 16–14–1 | In New England, Patriots' potential game-winning field goal is blocked. |
| 1975 | Bills 2–0 | Bills; 45–31 | Bills; 34–14 | Bills; 18–14–1 | Bills win nine straight meetings (1971–1975). |
| 1976 | Patriots 2–0 | Patriots; 26–22 | Patriots; 20–10 | Bills; 18–16–1 | In New England, O. J. Simpson and Patriots' DE Mel Lunsford are ejected for fighting. |
| 1977 | Tie 1–1 | Patriots; 20–7 | Bills; 24–14 | Bills; 19–17–1 | |
| 1978 | Patriots 2–0 | Patriots; 14–10 | Patriots; 26–24 | Tie; 19–19–1 | |
| 1979 | Tie 1–1 | Patriots; 26–6 | Bills; 16–13 (OT) | Tie; 20–20–1 | |

1980s (Patriots, 13–6)

| Season | Season series | at Buffalo Bills | at New England Patriots | Overall series | Notes |
|---|---|---|---|---|---|
| 1980 | Tie 1–1 | Bills; 31–13 | Patriots; 24–2 | Tie; 21–21–1 | |
| 1981 | Bills 2–0 | Bills; 20–17 | Bills; 19–10 | Bills; 23–21–1 | In Buffalo, Bills' QB Joe Ferguson throws a successful game-winning Hail Mary pass to RB Roland Hooks to clinch the final playoff spot for the Bills. |
| 1982 | Patriots 1–0 | no game | Patriots; 30–19 | Bills; 23–22–1 | As a result of the 1982 NFL Players strike, the game scheduled in Buffalo was cancelled. |
| 1983 | Patriots 2–0 | Patriots; 31–0 | Patriots; 21–7 | Patriots; 24–23–1 | Bills draft QB Jim Kelly as part of the Quarterback class of '83. |
| 1984 | Patriots 2–0 | Patriots; 21–17 | Patriots; 38–10 | Patriots; 26–23–1 | |
| 1985 | Patriots 2–0 | Patriots; 17–14 | Patriots; 14–3 | Patriots; 28–23–1 | Patriots lose Super Bowl XX. |
| 1986 | Patriots 2–0 | Patriots; 23–3 | Patriots; 22–19 | Patriots; 30–23–1 | |
| 1987 | Patriots 2–0 | Patriots; 13–7 | Patriots; 14–7 | Patriots; 32–23–1 | Following their home loss, the Bills went on a 17-game home winning streak against divisional opponents. Patriots win 11 straight meetings (1982–1987). |
| 1988 | Bills 2–0 | Bills; 23–20 | Bills; 16–14 | Patriots; 32–25–1 | |
| 1989 | Tie 1–1 | Bills; 31–10 | Patriots; 33–24 | Patriots; 33–26–1 | |

1990s (Bills, 12–8)

| Season | Season series | at Buffalo Bills | at New England Patriots | Overall series | Notes |
|---|---|---|---|---|---|
| 1990 | Bills 2–0 | Bills; 14–0 | Bills; 27–10 | Patriots; 33–28–1 | Bills lose Super Bowl XXV. |
| 1991 | Tie 1–1 | Bills; 22–17 | Patriots; 16–13 | Patriots; 34–29–1 | Bills lose Super Bowl XXVI. |
| 1992 | Bills 2–0 | Bills; 16–7 | Bills; 41–7 | Patriots; 34–31–1 | Bills lose Super Bowl XXVII. |
| 1993 | Bills 2–0 | Bills; 38–14 | Bills; 13–10 (OT) | Patriots; 34–33–1 | Patriots draft QB Drew Bledsoe. Bills lose Super Bowl XXVIII. |
| 1994 | Tie 1–1 | Patriots; 41–17 | Bills; 38–35 | Patriots; 35–34–1 | In Buffalo, Patriots overcome a 17–3 deficit. |
| 1995 | Patriots 2–0 | Patriots; 35–25 | Patriots; 27–14 | Patriots; 37–34–1 | |
| 1996 | Tie 1–1 | Bills; 17–10 | Patriots; 28–25 | Patriots; 38–35–1 | Patriots lose Super Bowl XXXI. |
| 1997 | Patriots 2–0 | Patriots; 31–10 | Patriots; 33–6 | Patriots; 40–35–1 | |
| 1998 | Tie 1–1 | Bills; 13–10 | Patriots; 25–21 | Patriots; 41–36–1 | Patriots score controversial last-second game-winning touchdown in New England game; Bills walk off field in protest before PAT attempt |
| 1999 | Bills 2–0 | Bills; 17–7 | Bills; 13–10 (OT) | Patriots; 41–38–1 | Last season until the 2020 season that the Bills swept the Patriots in the season series. |

2000s (Patriots, 18–2)

| Season | Season series | at Buffalo Bills | at New England Patriots | Overall series | Notes |
|---|---|---|---|---|---|
| 2000 | Tie 1–1 | Patriots; 13–10 (OT) | Bills; 16–13 (OT) | Patriots; 42–39–1 | Patriots draft QB Tom Brady. |
| 2001 | Patriots 2–0 | Patriots; 12–9 (OT) | Patriots; 21–11 | Patriots; 44–39–1 | Patriots win Super Bowl XXXVI. |
| 2002 | Patriots 2–0 | Patriots; 38–7 | Patriots; 27–17 | Patriots; 46–39–1 | Patriots open Gillette Stadium. Patriots trade QB Drew Bledsoe to Bills. |
| 2003 | Tie 1–1 | Bills; 31–0 | Patriots; 31–0 | Patriots; 47–40–1 | Bills sign SS Lawyer Milloy days after he was released by New England in the final preseason cuts. Patriots win Super Bowl XXXVIII. |
| 2004 | Patriots 2–0 | Patriots; 31–17 | Patriots; 29–6 | Patriots; 49–40–1 | Patriots win Super Bowl XXXIX. Last Start for Drew Bledsoe in the series. |
| 2005 | Patriots 2–0 | Patriots; 35–7 | Patriots; 21–16 | Patriots; 51–40–1 | |
| 2006 | Patriots 2–0 | Patriots; 28–6 | Patriots; 19–17 | Patriots; 53–40–1 | |
| 2007 | Patriots 2–0 | Patriots; 56–10 | Patriots; 38–7 | Patriots; 55–40–1 | In Buffalo, Patriots record their largest victory over the Bills with a 46–point differential and score their most points in a game against the Bills. Meanwhile, the Bills recorded their worst loss in franchise history. Patriots complete a perfect 16–0 regular season, but lose Super Bowl XLII. |
| 2008 | Patriots 2–0 | Patriots; 13–0 | Patriots; 20–10 | Patriots; 57–40–1 | |
| 2009 | Patriots 2–0 | Patriots; 17–10 | Patriots; 25–24 | Patriots; 59–40–1 | In New England, Bills KR Leodis McKelvin fumbles kickoff in the final minutes, leading to a Patriots' win. |

2010s (Patriots, 17–3)

| Season | Season series | at Buffalo Bills | at New England Patriots | Overall series | Notes |
|---|---|---|---|---|---|
| 2010 | Patriots 2–0 | Patriots; 34–3 | Patriots; 38–30 | Patriots; 61–40–1 | Patriots win 15 straight meetings (2003–2010). |
| 2011 | Tie 1–1 | Bills; 34–31 | Patriots; 49–21 | Patriots; 62–41–1 | In Buffalo, Bills overcome a 21–0 deficit to snap their 15-game losing streak and record their first win against the Patriots since the 2003 season. In New England, Patriots overcome a 21–0 deficit. Patriots lose Super Bowl XLVI. |
| 2012 | Patriots 2–0 | Patriots; 52–28 | Patriots; 37–31 | Patriots; 64–41–1 | |
| 2013 | Patriots 2–0 | Patriots; 23–21 | Patriots; 34–20 | Patriots; 66–41–1 | Patriots win 13 straight home meetings (2001–2013). |
| 2014 | Tie 1–1 | Patriots; 37–22 | Bills; 17–9 | Patriots; 67–42–1 | Bills' win in New England, their first since the 2000 season, snapped the Patriots' 35-game home winning streak against AFC opponents, ended their 16-game home winning streak, marked New England’s only home loss of the season, and guaranteed Buffalo's first winning record since the 2004 season. Patriots win Super Bowl XLIX. |
| 2015 | Patriots 2–0 | Patriots; 40–32 | Patriots; 20–13 | Patriots; 69–42–1 | |
| 2016 | Tie 1–1 | Patriots; 41–25 | Bills; 16–0 | Patriots; 70–43–1 | Patriots win Super Bowl LI. |
| 2017 | Patriots 2–0 | Patriots; 23–3 | Patriots; 37–16 | Patriots; 72–43–1 | In Buffalo, Patriots' TE Rob Gronkowski elbows Bills' CB Tre'Davious White, leading to a one-game suspension. Patriots lose Super Bowl LII. |
| 2018 | Patriots 2–0 | Patriots; 25–6 | Patriots; 24–12 | Patriots; 74–43–1 | Bills draft QB Josh Allen. Starting with their home win, the Patriots went on a 13-game winning streak. Patriots win Super Bowl LIII. |
| 2019 | Patriots 2–0 | Patriots; 16–10 | Patriots; 24–17 | Patriots; 76–43–1 | In New England, Patriots clinched the AFC East with their win. Additionally, the game was Tom Brady's final win with the Patriots. Patriots win seven straight meetings (2016–2019) and eight straight road meetings (2012–2019). |

2020s (Bills, 9–5)

| Season | Season series | at Buffalo Bills | at New England Patriots | Overall series | Notes |
|---|---|---|---|---|---|
| 2020 | Bills 2–0 | Bills; 24–21 | Bills; 38–9 | Patriots; 76–45–1 | Bills clinched the AFC East title for the first time since the 1995 season, ending the Patriots’ NFL-record streak of 11 consecutive divisional titles. In New England, the Bills recorded their first season series sweep of the Patriots since the 1999 season and handed the Patriots their first losing season since the 2000 season, becoming the first AFC East team to sweep the Patriots since 2000. Bills sweep division for the first time in franchise history. |
| 2021 | Tie 1–1 | Patriots; 14–10 | Bills; 33–21 | Patriots; 77–46–1 | |
| 2021 Playoffs | Bills 1–0 | Bills; 47–17 | —N/a | Patriots; 77–47–1 | AFC Wild Card Round. Bills score their most points in a game against the Patriots as they scored touchdowns on every offensive possession except their last possession, where they took a knee to end the game. |
| 2022 | Bills 2–0 | Bills; 35–23 | Bills; 24–10 | Patriots; 77–49–1 | In Buffalo, Bills eliminate the Patriots from playoff contention with their win. |
| 2023 | Tie 1–1 | Bills; 27–21 | Patriots; 29–25 | Patriots; 78–50–1 | With the loss, the Patriots were guaranteed to finish last in the AFC East for the first time since the 2000 season. |
| 2024 | Tie 1–1 | Bills; 24–21 | Patriots; 23–16 | Patriots; 79–51–1 | |
| 2025 | Tie 1–1 | Patriots; 23–20 | Bills; 35–31 | Patriots; 80–52–1 | In New England, the Bills overcame a 21–0 first-half deficit by scoring five straight touchdowns to snap the Patriots’ ten-game winning streak and became the first team to defeat the Patriots at home when the Patriots held a lead of at least 17 points, ending an NFL-record 120-game streak. Patriots lose Super Bowl LX. |
| 2026 | Patriots 1–0 | Patriots; 29–26 | December 6 | Patriots; 81–52–1 | Bills open "new" Highmark Stadium. |

Summary of Results

| Season | Season series | at Buffalo Bills | at Boston/New England Patriots | Notes |
|---|---|---|---|---|
| AFL regular season | Patriots 11–8–1 | Patriots 5–4–1 | Patriots 6–4 | |
| NFL regular season | Patriots 69–43 | Patriots 34–22 | Patriots 35–21 | |
| AFL and NFL regular season | Patriots 80–51–1 | Patriots 39–26–1 | Patriots 41–25 | |
| AFL and NFL postseason | Tie 1–1 | Tie 1–1 | no games | AFL Eastern Division: 1963; AFC Wild Card: 2021 |
| Regular and postseason | Patriots 81–52–1 | Patriots 40–27–1 | Patriots 41–25 | |

== Connections between the teams ==
The two teams have shared head coaches. Lou Saban was the first coach in Patriots history but was fired after five games of the 1961 season. He took over the Bills in 1962 and won two American Football League titles (1964–65). After a five-season period in Denver he returned to the Bills for the 1972–76 period.

Hank Bullough coached both teams: He was co-head coach (with Ron Erhardt) for the Patriots at the end of 1978 and coached the Bills for the final twelve games of 1985 and the first nine games of 1986.

| Name | Position(s) | Bills' tenure | Patriots' tenure |
|---|---|---|---|
| Lou Saban | Head coach | 1962–1965, 1972–1976 | 1960–1961 |
| Hank Bullough | Head coach/Defensive coordinator | 1984–1986 | 1973–1979 |
| Pepper Johnson | Defensive line coach/Linebackers coach | 2014 | 2000–2013 |
| Bob Bicknell | Wide receivers coach/Tight ends coach | 2010–2012 | 2024 |
| Brian Daboll | Wide receivers coach/Tight ends coach/Offensive coordinator | 2018–2021 | 2000–2006, 2013–2016 |
| Doug Marrone | Head coach/Offensive line coach | 2013–2014 | 2025–present |
| Mike Pellegrino | Cornerbacks coach/Nickels coach | 2025 | 2015–2024 |
| Bo Hardegree | Quarterbacks coach/Offensive assistant | 2026–present | 2021 |

=== Players ===
In addition to coaches, there have been several players who have played for the Bills and Patriots, including:

| Name | Position(s) | Bills' tenure | Patriots' tenure |
|---|---|---|---|
| Doug Flutie | Quarterback | 1998–2000 | 1987–1989, 2005 |
| Drew Bledsoe | Quarterback | 2002–2004 | 1993–2001 |
| Lawyer Milloy | Safety | 2003–2005 | 1996–2002 |
| Antowain Smith | Running back | 1997–2000 | 2001–2003 |
| Fred Smerlas | Defensive tackle | 1979–1989 | 1991–1992 |
| Sam Gash | Fullback | 1998–1999, 2003 | 1992–1997 |
| Larry Centers | Fullback | 2001–2002 | 2003 |
| Sammy Morris | Running back | 2000–2003 | 2007–2010 |
| Brandon Spikes | Linebacker | 2014, 2016 | 2010–2013 |
| Scott Chandler | Tight end | 2010–2014 | 2015 |
| Chris Hogan | Wide receiver | 2012–2015 | 2016–2018 |
| Stephon Gilmore | Cornerback | 2012–2016 | 2017–2021 |
| Alan Branch | Defensive tackle | 2013 | 2014–2017 |
| Damien Harris | Running back | 2023 | 2019–2022 |
| Stefon Diggs | Wide receiver | 2020–2023 | 2025 |
| Mack Hollins | Wide receiver | 2024 | 2025–present |
| Brandin Cooks | Wide receiver | 2025–present | 2017 |
| Matthew Judon | Linebacker | 2025 | 2021–2023 |

== In popular culture ==
The Bills–Patriots rivalry was parodied in the 2014 Family Guy episode "3 Acts of God" in which the teams' levels of success at the time were reversed. In the first part of the episode, Peter Griffin—along with his family and friends—attends a game between his hometown Patriots and the Bills at Gillette Stadium, which the Patriots lose following a last-minute blunder, leading to their 10th straight loss. This convinces Peter and his friends that God hates the Patriots. The episode also features former Bills players Mario Williams and C. J. Spiller guest starring as themselves. Ryan Fitzpatrick was also slated to guest star, but his part was cut as he was no longer on the Bills' roster at the time of the episode's airing.

== See also ==
- List of NFL rivalries
- AFC East
