= Jim Forbes (journalist) =

American journalist, writer (born 1955)

- Born: James Jude Forbes; April 1, 1955 (age 71)
- Occupations: Journalist, writer, voice actor
- Known for: Behind the Music

James Jude Forbes (born April 1, 1955) is an American journalist, writer and correspondent, and the narrator for Behind the Music and its spin-off Behind the Music: Remastered. Forbes has contributed to networks including CNN, Fox, PBS, VH1, ESPN, and E!, as well as programmers including Telepictures and United Television.

== Education ==
He received his BS in journalism 1977 from New York University with minors in history and political science. Additional studies include: Northwestern University, 1973–74, Syracuse University, 1975, and New School of Social Research, 1978

== Background ==
Forbes began his career as an investigative reporter for local television stations in New Mexico, Oklahoma, Connecticut and Los Angeles. He covered significant events including from the New Mexico State Penitentiary riot in 1980 and the 1992 Los Angeles riots.

Forbes formed his own production company in 1988. He continued his on-air work, hosting and working as a correspondent and produce and writing. Forbes also narrates documentary programming, including VH1’s Emmy-nominated series, Behind The Music, Behind the Music: Remastered, ESPN’s Emmy winning Sports Century as well as series for various networks and channels. In December 2007, Forbes narrated a DVD documentary of the thoroughbred racehorse Lava Man that was a stadium giveaway at Hollywood Park Racetrack. Forbes narrated the Emmy winning 2000 season finale of The Simpsons, and episodes of Saturday Night Live, The Tonight Show, Late Night, Jimmy Kimmel Live!, The Chris Rock Show, Chris Isaac Show, How I Met Your Mother and The Rosie O'Donnell Show. He is the featured exhibit voice of the recently renovated Basketball Hall of Fame in Springfield, Massachusetts.

== Awards ==
He received an ALMA Award for “Best Made for Television Documentary” for producing/directing and writing Selena, Behind the Music.
