= Drew Bledsoe =

American football player (born 1972)

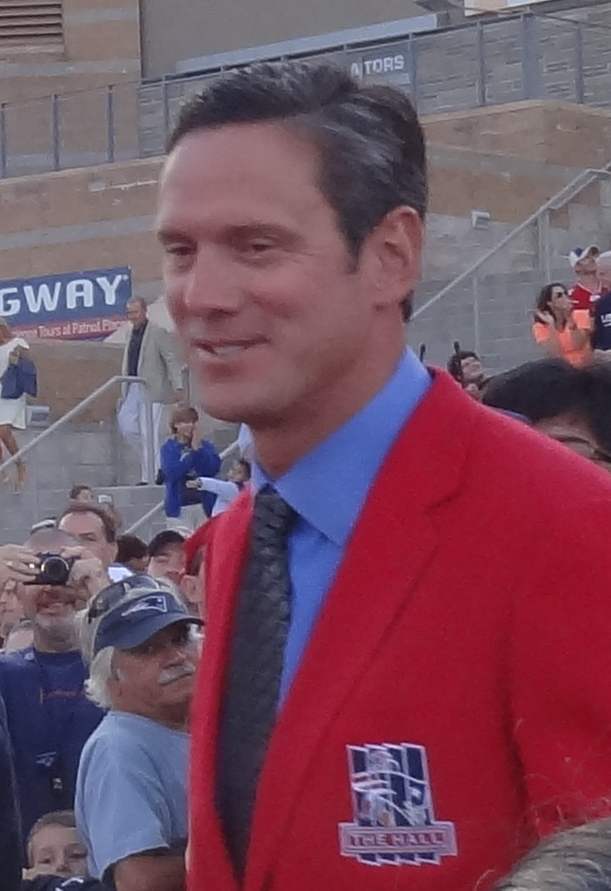
- Bledsoe in 2012

No. 11
- Position: Quarterback

Personal information
- Born: February 14, 1972 (age 54); Ellensburg, Washington, U.S.
- Listed height: 6 ft 5 in (1.96 m)
- Listed weight: 238 lb (108 kg)

Career information
- High school: Walla Walla (Walla Walla, Washington)
- College: Washington State (1990–1992)
- NFL draft: 1993: 1st round, 1st overall pick

Career history
- New England Patriots (1993–2001); Buffalo Bills (2002–2004); Dallas Cowboys (2005–2006)

Awards and highlights
- Super Bowl champion (XXXVI); 4× Pro Bowl (1994, 1996, 1997, 2002); NFL passing yards leader (1994); New England Patriots All-1990s Team; New England Patriots Hall of Fame; Second-team All-American (1992); Pac-10 Offensive Player of the Year (1992); First-team All-Pac-10 (1992); Second-team All-Pac-10 (1991); State of Washington Sports Hall of Fame (2012); Pac-12 Conference Hall of Honor (2022); NFL records: Most pass attempts in a game: 70; Most overtime touchdown passes: 4

Career NFL statistics
- Passing attempts: 6,717
- Passing completions: 3,839
- Completion percentage: 57.2%
- TD–INT: 251–206
- Passing yards: 44,611
- Passer rating: 77.1
- Stats at Pro Football Reference

Drew McQueen Bledsoe (born February 14, 1972) is an American former professional football quarterback who played in the National Football League (NFL) for 14 seasons, primarily with the New England Patriots. He played college football for the Washington State Cougars, earning second-team All-American honors and Pac-10 Offensive Player of the Year in 1992. Selected first overall in the 1993 NFL draft by the Patriots, Bledsoe ended a seven-year postseason drought by his second season and led the team to four playoff appearances, two division titles, and an appearance in Super Bowl XXXI. Bledsoe also earned three Pro Bowl selections and became the youngest quarterback to receive the honor in 1995.

Following a period of declining success and two consecutive seasons in which the Patriots missed the playoffs, Bledsoe suffered a near-fatal injury early in the 2001 season that led to backup Tom Brady becoming the team's starter. He was unable to regain his starting position for the remainder of the season due to Brady's success, which led to the Patriots winning their first championship in Super Bowl XXXVI and began a dynasty for the franchise. Bledsoe spent his next three seasons with the Buffalo Bills, where he received a fourth Pro Bowl selection, and his final two with the Dallas Cowboys.

While his tenure with the Patriots would be eclipsed by Brady, Bledsoe is recognized for helping rebuild the franchise and his role during their first Super Bowl-winning season when he relieved an injured Brady to help win the 2001 AFC Championship. For his accomplishments in New England, he was inducted into the Patriots Hall of Fame in 2011.

== Early life ==
Bledsoe attended Walla Walla High School and was a letterman in football, basketball, and track. In football, he was named a first-team All-State selection by the Tacoma News Tribune. In track, he competed in the throwing events, recording top-throws of 45.34 meters (148.8 ft) in the discus throw and 54.70 m (179.5 ft) in the javelin throw.

He was later inducted into the WIAA Hall of Fame in 2020.

== College career ==
Bledsoe spent his college career at Washington State University playing for the Cougars. After gaining the starting job at the end of the 1990 season as a true freshman (joined later by Jeff Tuel and Jayden de Laura as the only three in school history), he quickly became the face of the Cougars' offense. In 1992, Bledsoe led WSU to a 9–3 record (ranking #17 in the coaches poll and #15 in the AP) and a 31–28 win over Utah in the Copper Bowl in which Bledsoe completed 30 of 46 passes for 476 yards and two touchdowns, being named the Copper Bowl MVP. He also established WSU records in single-game passing yards (476), single-season pass completions (241), and single-season passing yards (3,246). He was named the Pac-10 Offensive Player of the Year.

Following an impressive junior year in 1992, Bledsoe decided to forgo his senior season and enter the 1993 NFL draft. In the 34 starts of his collegiate career he amassed 6,897 yards, 502 completions, and 44 touchdowns.

Bledsoe was later inducted into the Washington State Athletics Hall of Fame in 2001.

== Professional career ==
Pre-draft measurables
Height	Weight	Arm length	Hand span	20-yard shuttle	Vertical jump	Wonderlic
6 ft 5 in (1.96 m)	233 lb (106 kg)	33 1/4 in (0.84 m)	9 5/8 in (0.24 m)	4.54 s	32.5 in (0.83 m)	36
All values from NFL Combine

=== New England Patriots: 1993–2001 ===
Bledsoe was the first overall selection in the 1993 NFL draft, taken by the New England Patriots. He started right away for the Patriots in 1993, as they improved from two to five wins. As a rookie, he passed for 2,494 yards, 15 touchdowns, and 15 interceptions in 13 games. Bledsoe would also make history during the season as in week 17 in a game vs the Indianapolis Colts he would become the first rookie in NFL history to finish a game with a perfect passer rating in a 38–0 victory.

On November 13, 1994, the Patriots had won just three of their first nine games and were losing, 20–3, to the Minnesota Vikings at halftime. Bledsoe led a comeback victory in which the Patriots won, 26–20, in overtime, as he set single-game records in pass completions (45) and attempts (70). (The completion record was broken in November 2025 by another quarterback drafted by New England, Jacoby Brissett.) The win sparked the beginning of a new age for the Patriots, as they rallied behind Bledsoe and won their final six games to finish with a 10–6 record and capture the wild card spot. Bledsoe passed for 4,555 yards, 25 touchdowns, and 27 interceptions. The Patriots lost to the Cleveland Browns (led by future Patriots head coach Bill Belichick) in the wild-card round 20–13. Due to his performance, Bledsoe was selected to his first Pro Bowl as an alternate.

In the 1995 season, Bledsoe passed for 3,507 yards, 13 touchdowns, and 16 interceptions as the Patriots went 6–10. Following the difficult 1995 season, Bledsoe turned it around in 1996, ranking among the top passers in the league with the help of wide receiver Terry Glenn, pushing the Patriots to reach the playoffs again and winning the AFC championship over the Jacksonville Jaguars, 20–6. This led to an appearance in Super Bowl XXXI, where they lost to the Green Bay Packers, 35–21. Bledsoe completed 25 of 48 passes for 253 yards, two touchdowns, and four interceptions in the loss. He was also named a starter for the Pro Bowl that season, the second of his career.

During the 1997 season, Bledsoe helped the Patriots win five of their final seven games to once again qualify for the playoffs, the fourth time in eight years as a Patriots starter he would lead the team to a postseason appearance. The Patriots lost in the Divisional Round to the Pittsburgh Steelers; however, Bledsoe built a career-high 87.7 passer rating, passed for 3,706 yards, tossed 28 touchdowns, and earned his third Pro Bowl invitation.

In 1998, he became the first NFL quarterback to complete game-winning touchdown passes in the final 30 seconds of two consecutive games. In doing so, he propelled New England into the postseason for the third straight year. He completed these come-from-behind efforts while playing with a broken index finger on his throwing hand, an injury that would later sideline him for the postseason.

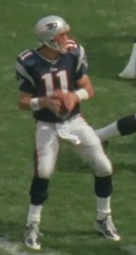
Bledsoe while playing for the New England Patriots

Bledsoe started the 1999 season very strong, with 13 touchdowns and only four interceptions as the Patriots held a 6–2 midseason record. However, Bledsoe subsequently threw only six touchdowns and 17 interceptions, and the team finished with an 8–8 record, while Bledsoe was sacked a career-high 55 times. The team's slide continued into the 2000 season as the Patriots ended with a 5–11 record. Bledsoe threw a then-career low thirteen interceptions that year but was sacked 45 times.

In March 2001, Bledsoe signed a then-record 10-year, $103 million contract. During the second game of the 2001 season on September 23, Bledsoe was racing toward the sideline on third-and-10 when New York Jets linebacker Mo Lewis leveled him with a hard, but clean hit. Bledsoe was about to dive for the first down marker, but defensive end Shaun Ellis clipped Bledsoe's ankles as he was about to dive, resulting in Lewis hitting Bledsoe while he was standing straight up. With Bledsoe appearing to have suffered a concussion, backup Tom Brady came in to finish the game. After the game, team trainer Ron O'Neill suspected Bledsoe did not look right and asked him to come to the medical room for evaluation. Team doctor Bert Zarins ran some tests and discovered Bledsoe's heart was racing. Zarins realized that this was something much more serious than a concussion; normally, concussed people have their heart rates tail off dramatically. Bledsoe was rushed to the hospital, where it was discovered that Lewis' hit sheared a blood vessel in his chest, causing a hemothorax that had him bleeding a pint of blood an hour. Doctors inserted a chest tube to alleviate bleeding, and Bledsoe was in the hospital for a few days.

Brady took the starting job and led New England to the playoffs. Bledsoe would never regain his starting role, although he proved integral to his team's playoff run when he replaced an injury-hobbled Brady in the AFC Championship Game against Pittsburgh. Bledsoe, starting from the Steelers' 40-yard line, capped a scoring drive with an 11-yard touchdown pass to David Patten to give the Patriots a 14–3 lead, as well as all of the momentum going into halftime. With the Steelers trailing by four points in the fourth quarter, Bledsoe put together a 45-yard drive to put the Patriots in field goal range where Adam Vinatieri converted to make the score 24–17. Bledsoe later drove New England into Steelers territory to set up a 50-yard kick to seal the game; however, Vinatieri missed and the ball went back to Pittsburgh. The Patriots defense held, and with a final score of 24–17 the upset was complete and the Patriots moved on to Super Bowl XXXVI. In winning the conference championship game, Bledsoe completed 10 of 21 passes for 102 yards, a touchdown, and no interceptions. It was the second time in six years (1996 and 2001) that Bledsoe was an integral part in leading the Patriots to a Super Bowl appearance, and during the on-field trophy presentation Bledsoe tossed his father a game ball. Brady started as quarterback as the Patriots won Super Bowl XXXVI, with kicker Adam Vinatieri hitting a game-winning 48-yard field goal as time expired.

With Brady entrenched as the starter, Bledsoe was traded in the offseason to the Patriots' division rival, the Buffalo Bills. Patriots fans appreciated Bledsoe's lengthy tenure and his role in improving the team, and cheered him in each of his three returns to New England as a visiting player.

=== Buffalo Bills: 2002–2004 ===
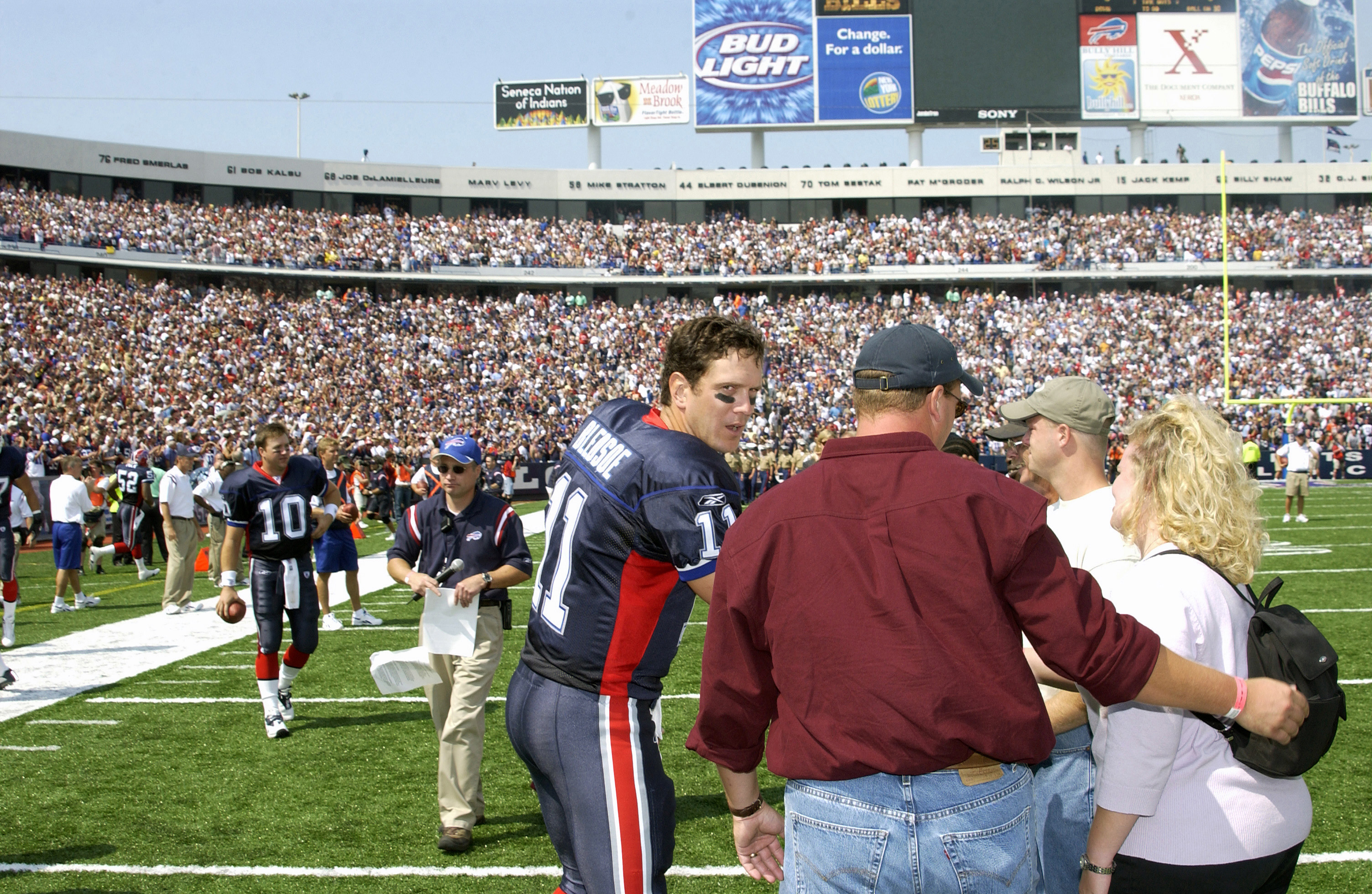
Bledsoe greeting family members of fallen Iraq War personnel before a game with the Buffalo Bills in 2003

Being sent to the Bills seemed to give Bledsoe a bit of rejuvenation in 2002. He had one of his best seasons, passing for 4,359 yards and 24 touchdowns and making his fourth trip to the Pro Bowl. In Week 2 against the Minnesota Vikings, Bledsoe set a team record with 463 yards passing in an overtime win. He led the Bills to an 8–8 record, which did not qualify for the postseason. He continued his strong play in 2003 as the Bills began the year 2–0. However, a flurry of injuries stymied the Bills offense; they failed to score a touchdown in three consecutive games en route to a 6–10 season. In 2004, they fell one game short of making the playoffs; a late season winning streak was wasted when Bledsoe and the Bills did poorly against the Pittsburgh Steelers backups in the season finale, finishing with a record of 9–7.

Bledsoe was released by the Bills after the 2004 season to make way for first-round draft pick J. P. Losman to become the starter. When Bledsoe later signed to the Dallas Cowboys, he expressed bitterness with the Bills for the move, stating "I can't wait to go home and dress my kids in little stars and get rid of the other team's [Buffalo's] stuff."

=== Dallas Cowboys: 2005–2006 ===
Bledsoe went on to sign with the Dallas Cowboys, where he was reunited with former coach Bill Parcells and wide receiver Terry Glenn. Bledsoe was intended to be a long-term solution as quarterback for the Cowboys. Said Bledsoe on the day he signed with Dallas, "Bill [Parcells] wants me here, and being the starter. I anticipate that being the case and not for one year." He signed for $23 million for three years.

During his tenure with the Cowboys, he threw for over 3,000 yards in a season for the ninth time in his career, tying Warren Moon for fourth in NFL history. That season, Bledsoe led five 4th-quarter/OT game-winning drives to keep the Cowboys' playoff hopes alive until the final day of the season. Though the team ultimately failed to reach the playoffs, Bledsoe led them to a 9–7 record, an improvement over the 6–10 mark that Vinny Testaverde had finished with in 2004.

However, in 2006, his final season with the Cowboys, Bledsoe's play became erratic, so much so that six games into the season he was replaced by Tony Romo. Shortly after the end of the 2006 season, Bledsoe was released by the Cowboys. Unwilling to be relegated to a backup position, Bledsoe announced his retirement from the NFL on April 11, 2007.

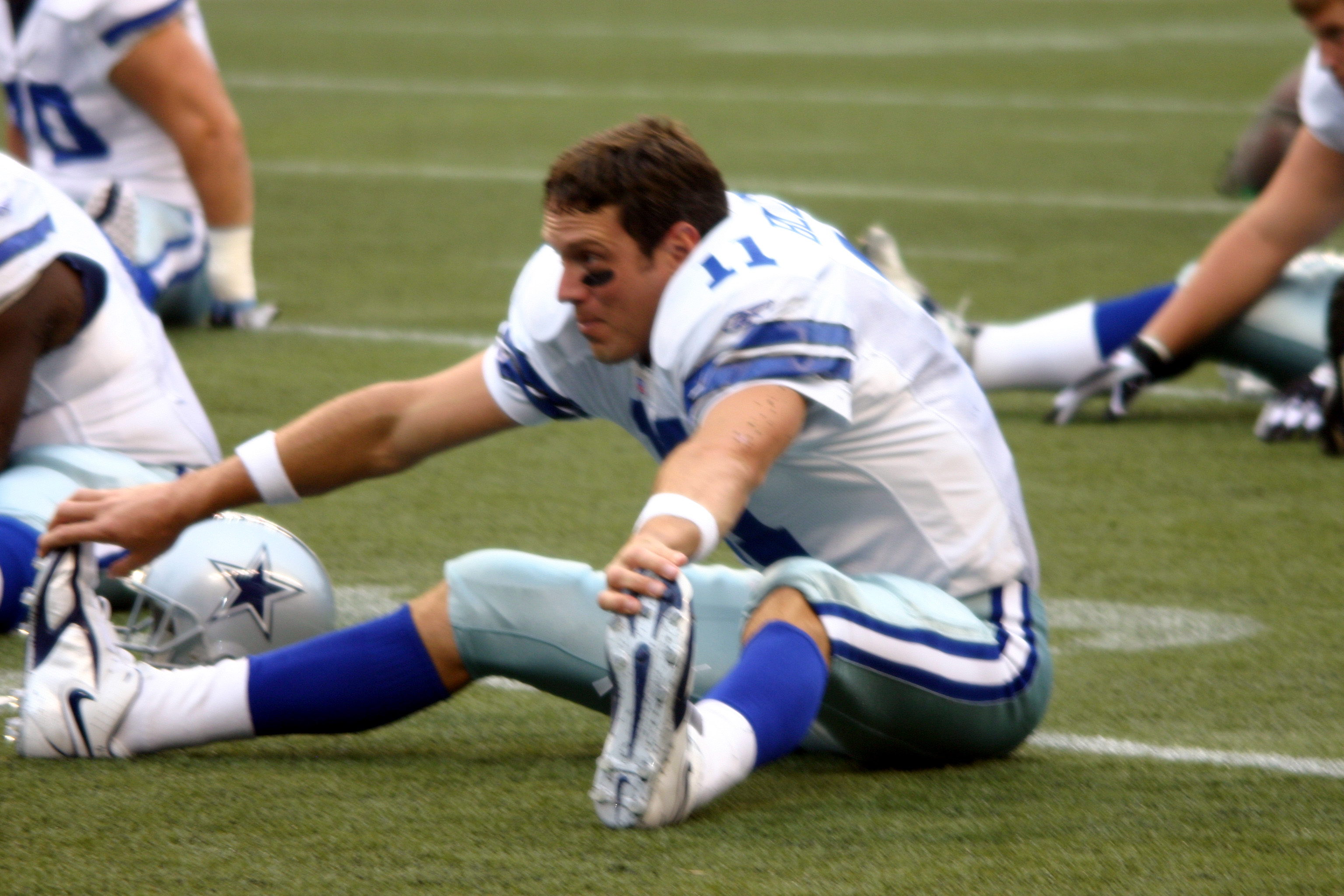
Bledsoe stretching before a game as a member of the Cowboys

Bledsoe would return to New England as a visiting player three times between 2002 and 2006. Each time, Patriots fans would rise and cheer Bledsoe in appreciation for his contributions to the team.

=== Retirement ===
When Bledsoe retired in April 2007, he left fifth in NFL history in pass attempts (6,717) and completions (3,839), seventh in passing yards (44,611), and thirteenth in touchdown passes (251).

=== Legacy ===
Bledsoe is recognized for leading the resurrection of the Patriots franchise, including his highlight performance when he came off the bench following a near career-ending injury, leading the team to victory in the 2001 AFC Championship game en route to the Patriot's first Super Bowl win. He started 193 of the 194 games played.

On May 16, 2011, Bledsoe was voted by Patriots fans into the Patriots Hall of Fame. He was formally inducted in a public ceremony outside The Hall at Patriot Place on September 17, 2011. Bledsoe beat former head coach Bill Parcells and defensive lineman Houston Antwine in a fan vote. Also in 2011 Bledsoe received the Football Legacy Award from The Sports Museum at TD Garden.

In July 2012, Bledsoe was named the 30th-greatest quarterback of the NFL's post-merger era by Football Nation.

He was inducted into the State of Washington Sports Hall of Fame in 2012.

In January 2018, Bledsoe was named honorary captain of the New England Patriots as they hosted the Jacksonville Jaguars in the AFC Championship Game. Bledsoe's Patriots had beaten the Jaguars 20–6 in the 1996 AFC Championship Game to advance to their second Super Bowl. Patriots owner Robert Kraft said in a statement "Drew Bledsoe played such an integral role in our efforts to rebuild the Patriots. He gave fans hope for the future by providing many memorable moments during his record-breaking career. For a franchise that had only hosted one playoff game in its first 35 years, winning the AFC Championship Game at home in Foxborough and taking the Patriots to the playoffs for three consecutive years were unimaginable goals prior to his arrival." The Patriots defeated the Jaguars 24–20 to advance to their tenth Super Bowl appearance and Bledsoe presented the Lamar Hunt Trophy to Kraft.

In 2019 The National Quarterback Club (NQBC) announced that Bledsoe would be inducted into the National Quarterback Hall of Fame at the 2019 NQBC Awards Dinner and Hall of Fame Induction.

In 2022 he was inducted into the Pac-12 Conference Hall of Honor.

== Career statistics ==
=== NFL ===
Legend
	Won the Super Bowl
	Led the league
**Bold**	Career high

==== Regular season ====
Year	Team	Games			Passing									Rushing				
Year	Team	GP	GS	Record	Cmp	Att	Pct	Yds	Y/A	Lng	TD	Int	Rtg	Att	Yds	Y/A	Lng	TD
1993	NE	13	12	5–7	214	429	49.9	2,494	5.8	54	15	15	65.0	32	82	2.6	15	0
1994	NE	**16**	**16**	10–6	**400**	**691**	57.9	**4,555**	6.6	62	25	**27**	73.6	44	40	0.9	7	0
1995	NE	15	15	6–9	323	636	50.8	3,507	5.5	47	13	16	63.7	20	28	1.4	15	0
1996	NE	**16**	**16**	**11–5**	373	623	59.9	4,086	6.6	84	27	15	83.7	24	27	1.1	8	0
1997	NE	**16**	**16**	10–6	314	522	60.2	3,706	7.1	76	**28**	15	**87.7**	28	55	2.0	8	0
1998	NE	14	14	8–6	263	481	54.7	3,633	**7.6**	**86**	20	14	80.9	28	44	1.6	10	0
1999	NE	**16**	**16**	8–8	305	539	56.6	3,985	7.4	68	19	21	75.6	42	101	2.4	**25**	0
2000	NE	**16**	**16**	5–11	312	531	58.8	3,291	6.2	59	17	13	77.3	**47**	**158**	3.4	16	**2**
2001	NE	2	2	0–2	40	66	60.6	400	6.1	58	2	2	75.3	5	18	3.4	8	0
2002	BUF	**16**	**16**	8–8	375	610	**61.5**	4,359	7.1	73	24	15	86.0	27	67	2.5	11	**2**
2003	BUF	**16**	**16**	6–10	274	471	58.2	2,860	6.1	54	11	12	73.0	24	29	1.2	11	**2**
2004	BUF	**16**	**16**	9–7	256	450	56.9	2,932	6.5	69	20	16	76.6	22	37	1.7	17	0
2005	DAL	**16**	**16**	9–7	300	499	60.1	3,639	7.3	71	23	17	83.7	34	50	1.5	9	**2**
2006	DAL	6	6	3–3	90	170	53.3	1,164	6.9	51	7	8	69.2	8	28	**3.5**	11	**2**
Career		194	193	98–95	3,839	6,717	57.2	44,611	6.6	86	251	206	77.2	385	764	2.0	25	10

==== Postseason ====
Year	Team	Games			Passing									Rushing				
Year	Team	GP	GS	Record	Cmp	Att	Pct	Yds	Y/A	Lng	TD	Int	Rtg	Att	Yds	Y/A	Lng	TD
1994	NE	1	1	0–1	21	50	42.0	235	4.7	24	1	3	38.3	2	2	1.0	3	**0**
1996	NE	**3**	**3**	**2–1**	**59**	**105**	**56.2**	**595**	**5.7**	**53**	**3**	**7**	54.3	3	**4**	**1.3**	**4**	**0**
1997	NE	2	2	1–1	39	76	51.3	403	5.3	39	1	2	60.4	**4**	0	0.0	**4**	**0**
2001	NE	1	0	0–0	10	21	47.6	102	4.9	18	1	0	**77.9**	**4**	1	0.3	**4**	**0**
2006	DAL	0	0	—	DNP													
Career		7	6	3–3	129	252	51.2	1,335	5.3	53	6	12	54.9	13	7	0.5	4	0

=== College ===
Season	Team	Passing								Rushing			
Season	Team	Cmp	Att	Pct	Yds	Y/A	TD	Int	Rtg	Att	Yds	Avg	TD
1990	Washington State	92	189	48.7	1,386	7.3	9	4	121.8	49	−67	−1.4	4
1991	Washington State	199	358	55.6	2,741	7.7	17	15	127.2	104	−94	−0.9	2
1992	Washington State	211	386	54.7	2,770	7.2	18	14	123.1	78	−53	−0.7	4

== Accomplishments ==
- His 4,452 pass attempts in his first eight seasons rank second to Brett Favre whose 4,456 attempts are the most by a quarterback during any eight-year period in NFL history.
- His 70 pass attempts in a single game is still an active league record.
- He passed for 3,291 yards in 2000, his seventh consecutive season with at least 3,000 yards passing.
- Bledsoe was durable during his career, playing in 126 of his first 132 games since entering the league in 1993, and never missing a start after leaving NE until benched in 2006.
- In 2002, his first season in Buffalo, he set single season records for yards, attempts, completions on an offense that had 7 other franchise records.
- In 1998, he directed the Patriots to the playoffs for the fourth time in six seasons.
- In 1994, he set Patriots franchise single-season passing records for attempts (691), completions (400), and yards passing (4,555; surpassed by Tom Brady in 2007).
- In 1995, he set a franchise record by attempting 179 consecutive passes without an interception (10/23/95 to 11/26/95; since surpassed by Tom Brady).
- At the age of 23, he became the youngest player in NFL history to surpass the 10,000-yard passing plateau when he connected with Ben Coates on a 6-yard completion just before the half vs. the Jets (12/10/95).
- Prior to 1994, the Patriots' single-season record for passing yards was 3,465 yards. Bledsoe eclipsed that mark six consecutive seasons.
- At the age of 22, he became the youngest quarterback in NFL history to play in the Pro Bowl.
- Led 31 career 4th-quarter or OT game-winning drives and holds the record for most TD passes in overtime with 4.

While Bledsoe has thrown for a high number of yards and attempts, a frequent criticism is that they are based on volume (attempts, completions, yards) rather than efficiency (passer rating, TD-to-INT ratio, yards per attempt) proving only that he has thrown a great number of times, not that he has thrown well. According to sports writer Don Banks, Bledsoe's large career totals "reveal more about his longevity than about his excellence".

Bledsoe ranks fifth all time in completions (3,839), seventh in passing yards (44,611), and thirteenth in touchdown passes (251). Bledsoe's passer rating of 77.1 was 46th all-time in league history when he retired in 2006. As of 2022, he ranks 109th in league history. His 57.2% completion percentage is tied for 99th in league history. Bledsoe's 37 regular season 300-yard passing games ranks ninth in league history. He also ranks sixth in most career regular-season 400-yard passing games by an NFL quarterback, having done it six times. He was selected to the Pro Bowl four times (in 1994, 1996, 1997, 2002). Bledsoe was eligible for the Pro Football Hall of Fame in 2011.

== Personal life ==
Bledsoe's parents were schoolteachers in Ellensburg, Washington. His mother was a teacher at Lewis & Clark Middle School, located in Yakima. His father was a coach who ran a football camp in Washington state, and Bledsoe was able to interact with the professional players and coaches who helped his father run the camp. He is the fourth cousin once removed of actor Neal Bledsoe.

The Bledsoe family moved five times before Bledsoe was in sixth grade. They finally settled in Walla Walla, where Bledsoe's father coached football at the high school. The only time Bledsoe played a whole season of football without ever starting at quarterback was in seventh grade at Pioneer Junior High. In high school, with his father as his coach, he won numerous awards, including selection to the Western 100 and Washington State Player of the Year. Heavily recruited by colleges such as Miami and Washington, he decided to attend Washington State, which was a two-hour drive from home.

Bledsoe and his wife Maura live in Bend, Oregon, where Maura (née Healy) has family ties. They have four children: sons Stuart, John, Henry, and daughter Healy. He coached Stuart and John at Summit High School in Bend, where he served as offensive coordinator/quarterbacks coach; during his tenure he helped the team win a State championship in 2015. John was a walk-on player on the Washington State football team in 2017.

While playing for the New England Patriots, Bledsoe lived in Bridgewater and Medfield, Massachusetts; his Medfield house was later purchased by former Major League Baseball player Curt Schilling.

After his retirement in 2007, Bledsoe founded the Doubleback Winery along with close friend Chris Figgins. After the 2014 vintage, Figgins left Doubleback and handed his interest in the business to his protege Josh McDaniels (not related to the Patriots assistant coach of the same name). The company's grapes, mostly Cabernet Sauvignon and Chardonnay, are harvested from McQueen Vineyards and Flying B Vineyards, located in and around Walla Walla, Washington. The wine saw some critical success and placed 53rd overall in Wine Spectator's Top 100 wines in 2010. His first vintage, 2007, quickly sold out of its initial 600 cases. In 2012, Wine Spectator's publisher Marvin R. Shanken invited Ernie Els, Greg Norman, Tom Seaver, and Bledsoe to introduce his wines, despite Shanken's disdain for the New England Patriots. Bledsoe also recorded a message to both Tony Romo and Dak Prescott in 2017 in his home, which also showed his red wine collection. In 2021, Bledsoe purchased an 80-acre (32 ha) property in Oregon's Eola-Amity Hills AVA with his business partner and winemaker Josh McDaniels. According to The Land Report, Bledsoe and his fellow winemakers in Walla Walla have played a critical role in establishing his hometown as the epicenter of the burgeoning wine industry in the Pacific Northwest.

In his spare time, Bledsoe works with many philanthropic organizations. In 1996, he established the Drew Bledsoe Foundation to support his parents’ vision for better parenting through their Parenting with Dignity curriculum. He also spends time inspiring local youth and has raised over a millions of dollars for over 170 children's hospitals. He was inducted into the Humanitarian Sports Hall of Fame in 2005.

In 2020, Bledsoe hosted his own short-lived eight-episode podcast titled Drew Bledsoe's Basement Tapes. He has since made guest appearances on other podcasts, talking about his career and giving takes about the current NFL.

== See also ==
- List of NFL quarterbacks who have posted a perfect passer rating
- List of celebrities who own wineries and vineyards
- List of most consecutive starts by a National Football League quarterback
