= Fresh Heir =

- Family Guy episode
- Episode no.: Season 12; Episode 14
- Directed by: Mike Kim
- Written by: Steve Callaghan
- Production code: BACX13
- Original air date: March 23, 2014

Episode chronology
← Previous "3 Acts of God"	Next → "Secondhand Spoke"
- Family Guy season 12

"Fresh Heir" is the fourteenth episode of the twelfth season of the animated comedy series Family Guy and the 224th episode overall. It aired on Fox in the United States on March 23, 2014, and is written by Steve Callaghan and directed by Mike Kim. The episode revolves around Lois's greedy father Carter Pewterschmidt who, after injuring himself, chooses his grandson Chris Griffin to inherit his fortune.

== Plot ==
Chris wants to spend time with Peter; Peter declines his request. When Carter breaks his leg at the mall trying to go up the downward escalator, Babs needs someone to look after him while she goes out of town; Lois can't and Meg won't, so Chris has to. However, Chris and Carter get along well; Chris teaches Carter how to masturbate by giving him a hand job, order pizza online, and play in a garage band.

After Carter's leg is healed, he tries to pay Chris, who turns it down; impressed by his grandson's humble nature, Carter makes him the sole heir to the family fortune—and Chris' reluctance to accept further elevates him in Carter's eyes. Upset at Carter's decision, Peter sucks up to Chris to get closer to the money; he tries dressing like Chris, sharing a classic teen movie, and engaging in a series of stunts—all unsuccessful.

At the Drunken Clam, the guys note that Peter looks exhausted, they also mention that whatever girl—or boy—Chris marries will be very lucky because of Chris's inheritance. This inspires Peter to propose a Vermont gay marriage to Chris when he gets home that night. Peter reveals that he got Lois unknowingly to sign a divorce agreement, so Chris decides to go with the wedding idea—as a way of finally being able to spend time with his father.

As they drive northwest to Vermont, Chris notes all of the preparations they must make, such as the gift registry and reception dance. On the wedding day, Lois and the rest of the family interrupts the ceremony to tell Peter what he is doing wrong. Chris stops her to reveal he knew all along it was for the money, but he didn't care because he just wanted to spend time with his dad. Peter and Chris agree to settle for being father and son, and they return home. Peter does a closing narration that references the Woody Allen movie Annie Hall and Woody Allen's marriage to his stepdaughter, Soon-Yi Previn.

== Reception ==
Eric Thurm of The A.V. Club gave the episode a D, commenting on how the frequent incest jokes “drags everything down, down into the depths of comedy/decency hell.” He also notes, “What makes the whole thing worse is that there’s a decent enough episode of Family Guy buried in here,” and goes on to detail how the plot of the episode could be salvaged.

The episode received a 2.2 rating in the 18–49 years old demographic and was watched by a total of 4.38 million people. This made it the most watched show on Animation Domination that night, beating American Dad!, Bob's Burgers and The Simpsons.
