= Secondhand Spoke =

- Family Guy episode
- Episode no.: Season 12; Episode 15
- Directed by: Julius Wu
- Written by: Dave Ihlenfeld; David Wright
- Production code: BACX12
- Original air date: March 30, 2014

Guest appearances
- Dee Bradley Baker as Owl; Gary Cole as Principal Shepherd; Chris Cox; Affion Crockett as Far-Away Black Man and Upbeat Black Kid; Cary Elwes as Dr. Watson; Carrie Fisher as Angela; Scott Grimes; Marlee Matlin as Stella; Rolando Molina as The guy in Meg's Bedroom; Emily Osment as Schoolgirl; Christine Marie Cabanos as Schoolgirl; Josh Robert Thompson as Tony Montana; Adam Carolla as Death (deleted scenes)

Episode chronology
← Previous "Fresh Heir"	Next → "Herpe the Love Sore"
- Family Guy season 12

"Secondhand Spoke" is the fifteenth episode of the twelfth season of the animated comedy series Family Guy and the 225th episode overall. It aired on Fox in the United States on March 30, 2014, and is written by Dave Ihlenfeld and David Wright and directed by Julius Wu. In the episode, Peter is asked to be the face of an anti-smoking campaign just as he has taken up the habit of smoking cigarettes, while Stewie helps Chris face bullies at school.

== Plot ==
Peter takes umbrage at Stella taking extra breaks to smoke at work and decides to start smoking. He soon begins smoking every chance he gets to stop whatever task he is doing. When Peter's smoking begins to affect his sex life with Lois, she tries to make him stop but he is unable to break the habit and starts sneaking smokes during any little task, causing him to become increasingly fidgety and irritated and deteriorating his appearance. At a stop-smoking clinic, a man named Mr. Stone wants Peter to be the face of their anti-smoking campaign but Peter must continue smoking to maintain his poor health. Peter appears in advertisements and becomes a celebrity, but his health continues to suffer to Lois' irritation. After Stone discovers that Peter is unremarkable after a NASCAR event, he releases him, to Peter's sorrow. Back at home, Peter announces that he is ready to go back to normal, but Lois and Brian explain that the damage he had suffered through smoking is irreversible.

Meanwhile, Brian gives Chris a ride to school, where he is confronted by four bullies. Seeing this, Stewie feels sorry for him and later offers to help him. He goes to school with Chris the next day and preps him to insult the bullies back; Chris flubs it, so Stewie hides in Chris' backpack to coach him, which is successful. The bullies later target Neil Goldman during lunch; Chris intervenes and soon becomes popular and nominated for class president as a result of Stewie's coaching. However, Chris kidnaps an unwilling Stewie to keep him handy, keeping him in his backpack. At the debate, Stewie points out that Chris has become the bully himself, and he realizes the truth. He drops out of the race and asks for Stewie's forgiveness. At home, Stewie congratulates Chris for his guts and mentions that two of the bullies who picked on Chris committed suicide over Chris' rebuttals.

== Reception ==
Eric Thurm of The A.V. Club gave the episode a B, saying "Phew. “Secondhand Spoke” is just a solid, middle-of-the-road episode of Family Guy, and after the last couple of weeks, that's all I really wanted. Everything in this episode is pretty straightforward, within the bounds of the characters (for the most part), and doesn't use horrible sources of humor. Exhale (with smoke). The good qualities of this episode are immediately apparent, when, after a brief scene of Chris getting bullied to set up the B-story, we jump right into the main plot: Peter getting addicted to cigarettes. Starting the main story without a few minutes of unrelated material is rare for this show, and it calls attention to how tightly plotted this episode is for a half-hour of Family Guy."

The episode received a 2.1 rating in the 18–49 years old demographic and was watched by a total of 4.17 million people. This made it the most watched show on Animation Domination that night, beating American Dad!, Bob's Burgers and The Simpsons.
