= BTM2 =

Documentary

BTM2 (also known as Behind the Music II: Road to Fame or Behind the Music 2) was a weekly documentary which focused on the personal lives of musicians. The show ran February 15, 2000 – June 13, 2000 with a total of one season with 12 produced episodes.

Cast and Crew

- Michael McNamara – Director
- Ambrose Smith – Narration
- Mary J. Blige – Interviewee
- Dr. Dre – Interviewee
- Method Man – Interviewee
- Mark Rowland – Writer
- Michael McNamara – Writer
- George Moll – Executive Producer
- Jeff Gaspin – Executive Producer
- Michael McNamara – Producer
- Brian McNamara - Supervising Producer
- Alex Castino – Associate Producer
- Linda Gonzalez – Associate Producer
- Sheri Spanish – Segment Producer
