= Herpe the Love Sore =

- Family Guy episode
- Episode no.: Season 12; Episode 16
- Directed by: Greg Colton
- Written by: Andrew Goldberg
- Production code: BACX16
- Original air date: April 6, 2014

Guest appearances
- Alexandra Breckenridge as Jenna; Ginger Gonzaga as Tiffany (deleted scenes); Bryan Cranston as himself (live-action sequence); Freddy Rodriguez as Handy Manny; Patrick Stewart as cutaway narrator; Tara Strong as Girl at Bowling alley (in DVD version)

Episode chronology
| ← Previous "Secondhand Spoke" | Next → "The Most Interesting Man in the World" |
- Family Guy season 12

"Herpe the Love Sore" is the sixteenth episode of the twelfth season of the animated comedy series Family Guy and the 226th episode overall. It aired on Fox in the United States on April 6, 2014, and is written by Andrew Goldberg and directed by Greg Colton. In the episode, Brian gives Stewie herpes. Meanwhile, Peter and his friends fight to rescue their favorite booth in the Clam bar after it is captured by another group of men.

== Plot ==
Peter gets a package at his door addressed to Quagmire. Lois tries to tell him to take it next door, but he opens it to find a whip inside. Though it rightfully belonged to Quagmire, he fools around with it in various ways, like trying to whip a cigarette in Meg's mouth, whipping people in the crowd at a Devo concert, and visiting Cleveland's house with it after Cleveland receives a heads up voicemail from Joe, warning him about it.

Upon arrival at the Drunken Clam, Peter, Quagmire, and Joe discover that a group of tough looking guys are sitting at their booth. When attempting to reclaim it with one of the tough men knocking down the stuff from Quagmire's mail that Peter had in his possession, the tough guys order them to go away causing them to leave sheepishly. This forces Peter, Quagmire, and Joe to sit at the bar making them uncomfortable where they are unable to see the television correctly. When word of their submission to the tough guys somehow gets out to all of Quahog, a male aircrew member refuses to follow Quagmire's orders and prefers to take orders from the co-pilot, Bonnie will not have sex with Joe causing him to call his male nurse Elton to carry him to the couch in the manner of An Officer and a Gentleman as he puts on a naval officer's cap in a role reversal, and Chris usurps Peter's position as the man of the house and has the entire family sit in Papasan chairs.

When Lois catches news of this, she demands that Peter and his friends stand up to the brutes. After a brutal fight, the brutes once again demand they leave. Peter refuses to give up and goes into a tirade about life events that went on while sitting at his booth including his children being conceived there and witnessing the Space Shuttle Challenger explosion, the 9/11 attacks and Barack Obama being elected President of the United States. The brutes reveal that they are soldiers who are only visiting Quahog and will be deployed to Afghanistan, which earns them applause from the Drunken Clam's patrons where Seamus uses Mort's head to salute them. Peter, Quagmire, and Joe are put down once again as Mayor Adam West declares this day in honor of the three soldiers, much to their chagrin.

Meanwhile, after watching the film The Outlaw Josey Wales where the characters become blood brothers, Stewie talks a hesitant Brian about becoming blood brothers themselves. The next morning, Stewie discovers that he has herpes. Horrified and enraged, he confronts Brian about this and finds that he had herpes all along under his fur and never told him. Stewie then ends up spreading the herpes sending out invitations to a friend's wedding, and later tries to hide his herpes at school with a fake beard, but when his teacher removes the beard, she and the classroom freak out and runs away from him, making him mopey and depressed.

Chris reveals to Stewie that he and Brian too became blood brothers and he had also gotten herpes from him and Brian has also concealed it from him. Chris and Stewie then get back at Brian for giving both of them herpes by hacking his Facebook account, ruining his dates by revealing his herpes condition to them, and making demands (including letting Chris drive Brian's car up the street). Having had enough, Brian demands that the duo cease and asks Stewie why he is being so vengeful. Stewie tells Brian that he feels betrayed by Brian for not revealing the herpes before they became blood brothers. This prompts Brian to apologize for hiding his herpes as he was self-conscious, and Stewie forgives him. Brian also assures Stewie that living with the herpes for the rest of his life would only be bad during stressful times. A cutaway shows a future Stewie at a job interview, having chronic herpes on his face.

== Reception ==
Eric Thurm of The A.V. Club gave the episode a C− saying "Throughout these reviews, I’ve often noted (probably excessively) that for a while now, the best part of Family Guy has been the relationship between Stewie and Brian. This is probably not a very controversial opinion, much as a lot of things about the show have attempted to stir the pot in the past few weeks and years. Tonight, Family Guy leans hard on the Brian-Stewie relationship and silly, unnecessarily “shocking” sources of comedy as Brian gives Stewie herpes, something that manages to be a totally run-of-the-mill, boring installment of the show."

The episode received a 2.3 rating in the 18–49 years old demographic and was watched by a total of 4.77 million people. This made it the most watched show on Animation Domination that night, beating American Dad!, Bob's Burgers and The Simpsons.
