= Thomas Chamberlain (soldier) =

Union Army officer (1841–1896)

Thomas Davee Chamberlain
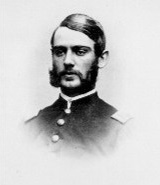
- Thomas Chamberlain (1864; age 23).
- Born: April 29, 1841. Brewer, Maine, U.S.
- Died: August 12, 1896 (aged 55); Bangor, Maine, U.S.
- Burial place: Castine, Maine, U.S.
- Military career
- Allegiance: United States: Union
- Branch: United States Army: Union Army
- Service years: 1862–1865
- Rank: Lieutenant Colonel
- Nickname: Tom
- Units: 20th Maine Infantry, Army of the Potomac

Thomas Davee Chamberlain (April 29, 1841 – August 12, 1896) was the lieutenant colonel of the 20th Maine Volunteer Infantry Regiment during the American Civil War, the brother of Union general Joshua L. Chamberlain, the colonel of the 20th Maine Infantry.

== Early life ==
Thomas D. Chamberlain was born in Brewer, Maine, the youngest of five children. Young Tom grew up on the family farm in Brewer with his four older siblings: Joshua Lawrence (born in 1828); Horace Beriah (1834); Sarah Brastow (1836); and John Calhoun (1838). Their upbringing seems to have been strict and religious but also loving. Thomas was a mischievous and likable boy—-his brother called him a "little rogue"—-and, as the baby of the family, he was his mother's favorite. Thomas was the only son not to attend college. Whether this was due to a lack of intelligence, application, or inclination is unknown. By the 1850s, in his mid-teens, Thomas was working as a grocery store clerk in Bangor.

== Civil War service ==
Chamberlain's great-grandfathers were soldiers in the American Revolutionary War. His grandfather had served during the War of 1812. His father also had served during the abortive Aroostook War of 1839. His brother Joshua was also in the army.

On August 29, 1862, Chamberlain joined the Union Army as a captain. He was commissioned in G Company in the 20th Maine. He transferred to Company S on January 28, 1865, and was promoted to major in the same day and on March 15, 1865, he was promoted to lieutenant colonel. His motives were a mixture of personal, patriotic, and religious.

Thomas Chamberlain was soon placed in the newly formed 20th Maine Infantry along with his brother Joshua, who was made colonel of the regiment.

The 20th Maine regiment marched to the Battle of Antietam, but did not participate in the fighting. The brothers fought at the Battle of Fredericksburg, suffering light casualties in the assaults on Marye's Heights, but they were forced to spend a miserable night on the freezing battlefield among the many wounded and dead from other regiments. They missed the Battle of Chancellorsville in May 1863 due to an outbreak of smallpox in their ranks, which kept them on guard duty in the rear. In June 1863, Joshua was promoted to colonel of the regiment, after the promotion of its first colonel, Adelbert Ames, to brigade command. Thomas Chamberlain was involved in most of the other battles in which the 20th Maine fought, most notably the Battle of Gettysburg.

=== The Battle of Gettysburg ===
During the defense of Little Round Top, the 20th Maine came under heavy attack from the Confederate 15th Alabama regiment, part of the division led by Maj. Gen. John Bell Hood, and after about 3–4 hours of fighting the 20th Maine completely ran out of ammunition. Chamberlain's brother Joshua recognized the dire circumstances and ordered his left wing to respond to the rebels by charging downhill with fixed bayonets, thus ending the Confederate attack on the hill. The 20th Maine and the 83rd Pennsylvania together captured over 400 soldiers from the attacking Confederate forces. Joshua was slightly wounded in the foot by a spent bullet. Thomas was unhurt, except for "several scratches". As a result of their valiant defense of the hill, the Chamberlain brothers, Joshua Chamberlain especially, and the 20th Maine gained a great reputation and they were the subject of many publications and stories.

=== After Gettysburg ===
After Gettysburg, the major battles in which Thomas Chamberlain and the 20th Maine were involved were the Battle of Spotsylvania Court House and the siege of Petersburg. At the siege of Petersburg, the 20th Maine was in reserve, while Joshua (against his better judgment) led his Pennsylvania Bucktail brigade in a charge on a section of the Confederate defenses known as Rives's Salient. Turning to direct his troops, Joshua was struck by a minié ball, which entered just below his right hip, nicked his bladder and urethra, and stopped at his left hip. Such a devastating wound should have been fatal, and when he arrived at the field hospital, three miles behind the lines, his life was feared over. Thomas Chamberlain, back with his regiment, eventually heard the news. He and the surgeon of the 20th Maine, Dr. Abner O. Shaw, went to the hospital where Joshua was dying. As Thomas waited, Dr. Shaw, with Dr. Morris W. Townsend of the 44th New York, worked all night to try to save Joshua Chamberlain's life. Thirty-five years later, Joshua Chamberlain wrote that, after the surgeons had finished: "Tom stood over me like a brother, and such a one as he was." Remarkably, Col. Chamberlain survived to enjoy his "on the spot" promotion to brigadier general, although he never returned to full fitness. A number of biographers of Joshua Chamberlain say that his life was saved through the activity of his brother, Thomas.

=== Appomattox Campaign ===
After Petersburg, Thomas Chamberlain and the 20th Maine were involved in the Battle of Five Forks (for which he was awarded Brevet Lieutenant Colonel for his bravery) and the Battle of Appomattox Courthouse. At the end of the war, the 20th Maine marched from Appomattox, Virginia, on May 2, reaching Washington, D.C., on May 12, where it was then finally mustered out of service on July 16, 1865. He ended the war with the rank of lieutenant colonel.

== Postbellum ==
He was mustered out on July 16, 1865, despite his distinguished military record, Chamberlain drifted from one job to another. He suffered from alcoholism as well as severe lung disease and heart disease. He died at age 55 in Bangor, Maine.

== In popular culture ==
Chamberlain was a character in Michael Shaara's Pulitzer Prize-winning historical novel, The Killer Angels. He was also portrayed in the movie based on that novel, Gettysburg, played by actor C. Thomas Howell, who repeated that role in the Gods and Generals prequel, based on the novel, Gods and Generals, written by Jeff Shaara, Michael Shaara's son. Chamberlain is portrayed in the two motion pictures as an energetic, youthful sidekick to his commander and older brother, Joshua Chamberlain (played by Jeff Daniels).

== Bibliography ==
- Shaara, Michael (1974). The Killer Angels. Random House. ISBN 1-58663-524-7.
- Shaara, Jeff (1996). Gods and Generals. The Ballantine Publishing Group. ISBN 0-345-40492-0.
- Shaara, Jeff (1998). The Last Full Measure. The Ballantine Publishing Group. ISBN 0-345-43481-1.
