= The Final Storm (Shaara novel) =

Book by Jeff Shaara

The Final Storm: A Novel of World War II in the Pacific
- First edition
- Author: Jeff Shaara
- Language: English
- Genre: War; Historical fiction
- Publisher: Ballantine Books
- Publication date: May 17, 2011
- Publication place: United States
- Media type: Print; Audio
- Pages: 480
- ISBN: 978-0-345-49795-6
- Preceded by: No Less Than Victory

The Final Storm (2011) is a historical novel by Jeff Shaara based on the Pacific Theater of World War II. It follows roughly chronologically after his European World War II trilogy ending with No Less Than Victory. It was published on May 17, 2011.

The story opens in February 1945 when an American submariner witnesses the shock of getting ambushed by two Japanese ships. The story then cuts toward late March and early April, where the novel covers the Battle of Okinawa, the dropping of the atomic bombs on Hiroshima and Nagasaki, and the surrender of Japan. The first part of the narrative is told primarily from the viewpoints of Admiral Chester W. Nimitz, Private Clay Adams (brother of Jesse Adams, a character in The Rising Tide and The Steel Wave), and Japanese General Mitsuru Ushijima. The second part of the narrative is told primarily from the viewpoints of President Harry S. Truman, Colonel Paul Tibbets, and Dr. Okiro Hamishita, a doctor living near Hiroshima.

== Reception ==
The book did well upon its release, reaching The New York Times bestseller list on June 5, 2011 top 15 for 4 weeks.
