= Steven E. Woodworth =

American historian

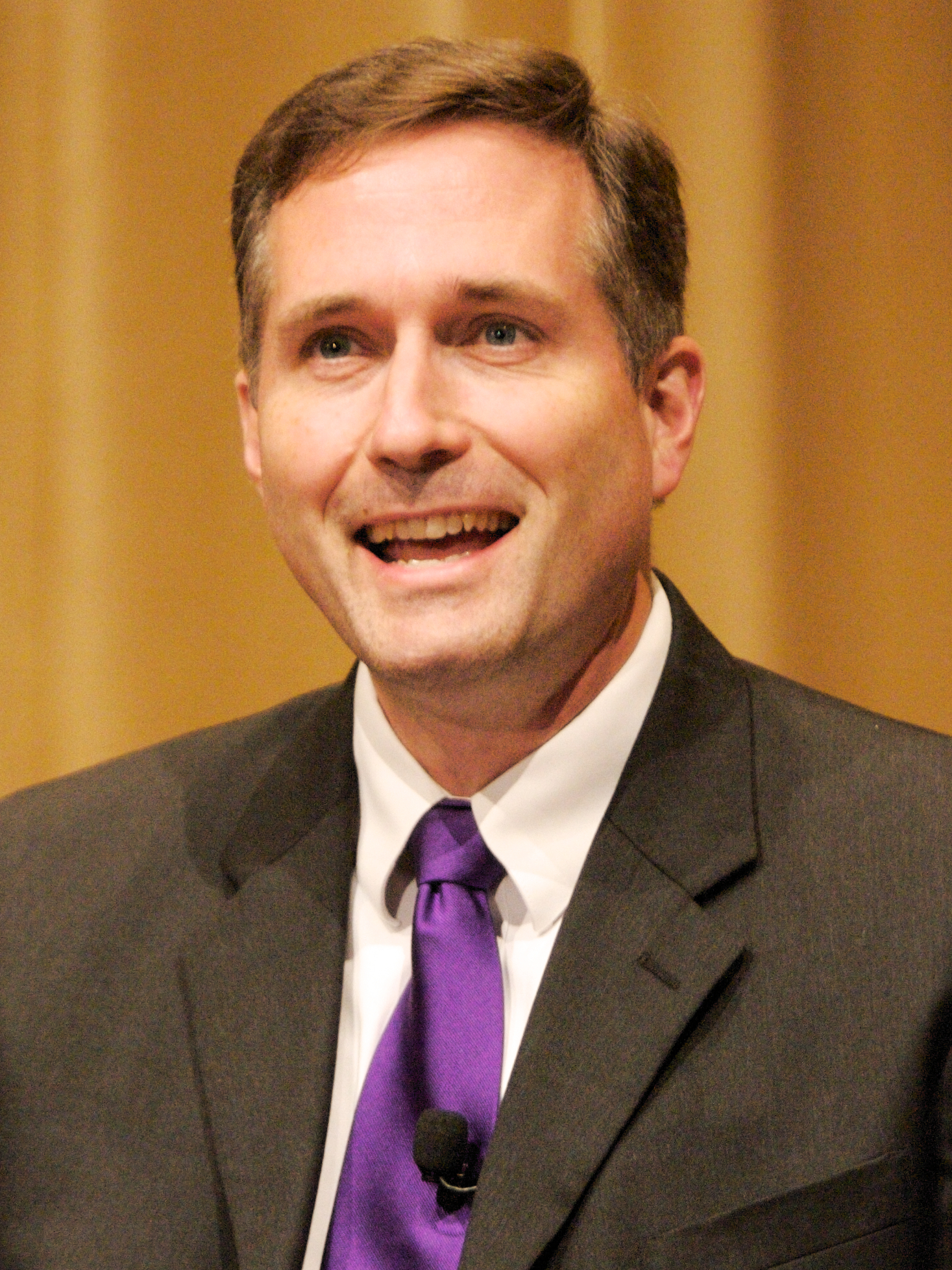
- Woodworth in 2010
- Born: January 28, 1961 (age 65); Ohio, United States
- Occupation: Historian

Steven E. Woodworth (born January 28, 1961) is an American historian specializing in studies of the American Civil War. He has written numerous books concerning the Civil War, and as a professor has taught classes on the Civil War, the Reconstruction Era, and military history.

== Career ==
Steven E. Woodworth was born in Ohio on January 28, 1961 and spent most his early life in Illinois. He graduated from Southern Illinois University in 1982 with a B.A. in history. He received his Ph.D. in 1987 at Rice University. Woodworth served as a professor at Oklahoma Wesleyan University in Bartlesville, Oklahoma, and at Toccoa Falls College in Toccoa Falls, Georgia, where he taught a wide variety of history courses, including on life in ancient Mesopotamia. He began working as a professor at Texas Christian University in 1997. He has taught courses there on the Old South, the Civil War, and Reconstruction.

Woodworth is a firm believer in the strategic importance of the sometimes-overlooked Western Theater of the American Civil War. In Jefferson Davis and His Generals: The Failure of Confederate Command in the West, he wrote:

The Virginia front was by far the more prestigious theater. ... Yet the war's outcome was decided not there but in the vast expanse that stretched west from the Appalachian Mountains to the Mississippi and beyond. Here, in the West, the truly decisive battles were fought.

Writing in the Journal of American History, Woodworth derided the 2003 Civil War film Gods and Generals, based on Jeff Shaara's 1998 novel of the same name, as a modern-day telling of Lost Cause mythology. Woodworth called the movie "the most pro-Confederate film since Birth of a Nation, a veritable celluloid celebration of slavery and treason." He summed up his reasons for disliking the movie by saying:

Gods and Generals brings to the big screen the major themes of Lost Cause mythology that professional historians have been working for half a century to combat. In the world of Gods and Generals, slavery has nothing to do with the Confederate cause. Instead, the Confederates are nobly fighting for, rather than against, freedom, as viewers are reminded again and again by one white southern character after another.

Woodworth criticized the portrayal of slaves as being "generally happy" with their condition. He also criticizes the relative lack of attention given to the motivations of Union soldiers fighting in the war. He excoriates the film for allegedly implying, in agreement with Lost Cause mythology, that the South was more "sincerely Christian." Woodworth concludes that the film, through "judicial omission," presents "a distorted view of the Civil War."

== Selected works ==
The following are books written by Woodworth:

- Jefferson Davis and His Generals: The Failure of Confederate Command in the West. University Press of Kansas. 1990. ISBN 978-0-7006-0461-6.
- Davis and Lee at War (1995)
- Six Armies in Tennessee: The Chickamauga and Chattanooga Campaigns (1998)
- While God Is Marching On: The Religious World of Civil War Soldiers (2001)
- Beneath a Northern Sky: A Short History of the Gettysburg Campaign (2003)
- Nothing but Victory: The Army of the Tennessee, 1861-1865 (2005)
- Manifest Destinies: Westward Expansion and the Civil War (2010)
- This Great Struggle: America's Civil War (2011)
