= Gettysburg (1993 film) =

1993 film by Ronald F. Maxwell

- Theatrical release poster
- Directed by: Ronald F. Maxwell
- Screenplay by: Ronald F. Maxwell
- Based on: The Killer Angels by Michael Shaara
- Produced by: Moctesuma Esparza; Robert A. Katz
- Starring: Tom Berenger; Jeff Daniels; Martin Sheen; Maxwell Caulfield; Kevin Conway; C. Thomas Howell; Richard Jordan; James Lancaster; Stephen Lang; Sam Elliott
- Cinematography: Kees Van Oostrum
- Edited by: Corky Ehlers
- Music by: Randy Edelman
- Production companies: Turner Pictures; Esparza/Katz Productions
- Distributed by: New Line Cinema
- Release date: October 8, 1993
- Running time: 254 minutes 271 minutes (director's cut)
- Country: United States
- Language: English
- Budget: $20 million
- Box office: $12.7 million

Gettysburg is a 1993 American epic war film about the Battle of Gettysburg in the American Civil War. Written and directed by Ronald F. Maxwell, the film was adapted from the 1974 historical novel The Killer Angels by Michael Shaara. It features an ensemble cast, including Tom Berenger as James Longstreet, Jeff Daniels as Joshua Chamberlain, Martin Sheen as Robert E. Lee, Stephen Lang as George Pickett, and Sam Elliott as John Buford.

Originally filmed as a miniseries for TNT, Gettysburg received a limited theatrical release from New Line Cinema under the direction of Ted Turner, who owned both entities. At four hours and 14 minutes, it is the longest film released theatrically by a major film studio in the United States. It received positive reviews from critics and despite grossing $12.7 million on a $20 million budget was considered a hit due to its successful TNT premiere ratings and home video sales. A prequel entitled Gods and Generals was released in 2003, also directed by Maxwell and featuring many returning cast members.

== Plot ==
The film begins with a narrated map showing the Confederate Army of Northern Virginia, commanded by Robert E. Lee, crossing the Potomac River to invade the North in June 1863, marching across Maryland and into Pennsylvania. On June 30, Confederate spy Henry Thomas Harrison reports to Lt. Gen. James Longstreet, commander of the First Corps, that the Union Army of the Potomac is moving in their direction, and that Union commander Joseph Hooker has been replaced by George Meade. Longstreet reports the information to General Lee, who is concerned that the army is moving "on the word of an actor", as opposed to that of his cavalry chief, J. E. B. Stuart. Nonetheless, Lee orders the army to concentrate near the town of Gettysburg. At the Union encampments near Union Mills, Maryland, Col. Joshua Lawrence Chamberlain of the 20th Maine is ordered to take in 120 men from the disbanded 2nd Maine who had resigned in protest, with permission to shoot any man who refuses to fight. Chamberlain speaks to the men, and is able to persuade all but six to take up arms.

In Gettysburg, Brig. Gen. John Buford and his cavalry division spot elements of Henry Heth's division of A. P. Hill's Third Corps approaching the town and deduce that the main body of the Confederate army is not far behind. Buford recognizes that, with precedent from previous battles, the Confederates will arrive at Gettysburg first and entrench in strong positions, forcing the Union to charge them and suffer heavy casualties. To prevent this, he opts to stand and fight where he is, judging the terrain to be "lovely ground" for slowing the Confederate advance. Buford sends word to I Corps commander Maj. Gen. John F. Reynolds to bring up reinforcements. Heth's troops engage Buford's cavalry the following morning, July 1, with Richard S. Ewell's Second Corps moving in to flank them. Reynolds brings his corps forward, but is killed by a Confederate sharpshooter. The Union army is pushed out of Gettysburg to Cemetery Ridge, and Lee—rejecting Longstreet's suggestion to redeploy south of Gettysburg and go on the defensive—orders Ewell to take the Union position "if practicable". However, Ewell hesitates and does not engage. The armies concentrate at their chosen positions for the remainder of the first day. At Confederate headquarters at Seminary Ridge, Maj. Gen. Isaac R. Trimble angrily denounces Ewell's inaction to Lee, and requests another assignment.

On the second day, July 2, Col. Strong Vincent's brigade from the Union V Corps is deployed to Little Round Top, and Vincent places the 20th Maine at the end of the line, warning Chamberlain that he and his regiment are the flank, and that if they retreat, the Confederate army can swing around behind them and rout the Union forces. Chamberlain speaks to the six remaining men of the 2nd Maine, and three of them decide to fight. Lee orders Longstreet to deploy his two available divisions to take Little Round Top and the neighboring Big Round Top. As Longstreet's corps deploys, Maj. Gen. John Bell Hood, commanding one of the divisions, protests to Longstreet; with the Union holding the high ground, he would lose half his forces if he attacked as ordered. Longstreet, despite his own protests to Lee, orders Hood to attack; Hood is later wounded fighting at Devil's Den. Below the summit of Little Round Top, Chamberlain and the 20th Maine fight off wave after wave of advancing Confederates, and begin running out of ammunition. Colonel Vincent is mortally wounded, and none of the other three regiments in his brigade are able to provide support. Chamberlain orders his men to fix bayonets, and charge in a right wheel down the slope against the attacking Confederates, which Chamberlain describes as "we'll swing it down; we swing like a door." The attack successfully drives the Confederate assault back, and the Union flank holds. That evening, Stuart finally arrives, and Lee reprimands him for his being out of contact. At the same time, Longstreet's remaining division, under Maj. Gen. George Pickett, arrives on the field.

For the third day, July 3, Lee decides to send three divisions—Pickett's, Trimble's, and J. Johnston Pettigrew's—to attack the center of the Union line at Cemetery Ridge. Longstreet expresses his belief to Lee that the attack will fail, as the movement is a mile over open ground, and that the Union II Corps under Maj. Gen. Winfield Scott Hancock is deployed behind a stone wall, just as Longstreet's men had been at Fredericksburg. Lee nonetheless orders the attack to proceed. Longstreet then meets with the three division commanders and details the plan, beginning first with Colonel Edward Porter Alexander's artillery clearing the Union guns off the ridge, before deploying the men forward. Despite heavy Confederate fire, Alexander is unable to make an impact upon the Union guns. When Pickett asks to move forward, Longstreet simply nods. The Confederate divisions march across the open field, and Hancock is wounded as he commands from the front line. One of Pickett's brigades, commanded by Brig. Gen. Lewis Armistead, makes it over the stone wall, but Armistead is wounded and captured by Union troops. The Confederates retreat due to high casualties. Seeing a despondent General Pickett, General Lee implores him to "look to your division," to which Pickett replies "General Lee, I have no division." Pickett's Charge ultimately fails. Meeting with Longstreet that evening, Lee finally decides that they will withdraw. The film ends with the fates of the major figures of the battle.

== Cast ==
=== Confederate ===
- Tom Berenger as Lieutenant General James Longstreet
- Martin Sheen as General Robert E. Lee
- Stephen Lang as Major General George Pickett
- Richard Jordan as Brigadier General Lewis Armistead
- Andrew Prine as Brigadier General Richard B. Garnett
- Cooper Huckabee as Henry Thomas Harrison
- Patrick Gorman as Major General John Bell Hood
- Bo Brinkman as Major Walter H. Taylor
- James Lancaster as Lieutenant Colonel Arthur Fremantle
- W. Morgan Sheppard as Major General Isaac R. Trimble
- Kieran Mulroney as Major Moxley Sorrel
- James Patrick Stuart as Colonel Edward Porter Alexander
- Tim Ruddy as Major Charles Marshall
- Royce D. Applegate as Brigadier General James L. Kemper
- Ivan Kane as Captain T. J. Goree
- Warren Burton as Major General Henry Heth
- MacIntyre Dixon as Major General Jubal Early
- Joseph Fuqua as Major General J. E. B. Stuart
- Tim Scott as Lieutenant General Richard S. Ewell
- George Lazenby as Brigadier General J. Johnston Pettigrew
- Graham Winton as Major General Robert E. Rodes

Ted Turner, the owner of the film's production company Turner Pictures, has an uncredited appearance as Colonel Waller T. Patton.

=== Union ===
- Jeff Daniels as Colonel Joshua Chamberlain
- Sam Elliott as Brigadier General John Buford
- C. Thomas Howell as Lieutenant Thomas Chamberlain
- Kevin Conway as Sergeant Buster Kilrain
- Brian Mallon as Major General Winfield Scott Hancock
- Buck Taylor as Colonel William Gamble
- John Diehl as Private Joseph Bucklin
- Joshua D. Maurer as Colonel James Clay Rice
- John Rothman as Major General John F. Reynolds
- Richard Anderson as Major General George Meade
- Billy Campbell as Lieutenant Andrew Lewis Pitzer
- David Carpenter as Colonel Thomas C. Devin
- Maxwell Caulfield as Colonel Strong Vincent
- Donal Logue as Captain Ellis Spear
- Dwier Brown as Captain Brewer
- Herb Mitchell as Sergeant Andrew J. Tozier
- Mark Moses as Ordnance Sergeant Owen
- Emile O. Schmidt as Brigadier General John Gibbon

Ken Burns, who wrote and directed the 1990 documentary The Civil War, portrays an aide to Hancock. Civil War historian Brian Pohanka makes an uncredited appearance as Brigadier General Alexander S. Webb. Matt Letscher, who would later appear in the 2003 prequel Gods and Generals as Colonel Adelbert Ames, makes his film debut as a 2nd Maine soldier.

== Production ==
Reeves Teletape Studios first acquired the rights for an adaptation of The Killer Angels in 1978. In 1981, Ronald F. Maxwell acquired the rights to the property and hired Michael Shaara to write a screenplay adaptation. Although Shaara died in 1988, Maxwell completed the 400-page screenplay. PolyGram Pictures agreed to produce the project as a film starring Robert Duvall and William Hurt but went bankrupt shortly afterwards. Maxwell was unable to sell the project to any other studio because of the failures of recent historical epics such as Heaven's Gate and Revolution. Kevin Costner was interested in adapting the film but chose instead to direct Dances with Wolves.

Although Maxwell was displeased with American Civil War television series such as North and South and The Blue and the Gray, he reluctantly decided to try to release the project as a television series. The producers originally pitched the project to ABC in 1991, as a television miniseries. ABC initially agreed to back the project, but when a miniseries about George Armstrong Custer, Son of the Morning Star (1991), got low ratings and after the Gulf War started, ABC pulled out. Maxwell, with help from documentarian Ken Burns, finally secured funding for the film from Ted Turner at the 2nd Golden Laurel Awards in 1991. Originally it was planned as a miniseries for Turner Network Television, but it was released as a film instead.

Duvall decided against starring as Robert E. Lee in order to appear in Stalin, while Albert Finney and George C. Scott declined the role.

Russell Crowe, then an unknown to the US film industry, was favored by Maxwell for the role of Joshua Chamberlain but he was eventually passed over in favor of Jeff Daniels.

For the first time, the National Park Service allowed the motion picture industry to recreate and film battle scenes directly on the Gettysburg Battlefield, including scenes of Devil's Den and Little Round Top. However, much of the movie was shot at a nearby Adams County farm. Thousands of Civil War reenactors from across the country volunteered their time to come to Gettysburg to participate in the massive battle scenes.

The score was composed by Randy Edelman.

== Soundtrack ==
The soundtrack was composed by Randy Edelman and issued on Milan Records.

Gettysburg soundtrack
No.	Title	Length
1.	"Main Title"	4:36
2.	"Men of Honor"	2:57
3.	"Battle of Little Round Top"	3:57
4.	"Fife and Gun"	3:03
5.	"General Lee At Twilight"	1:25
6.	"The First Battle"	2:41
7.	"Dawn"	1:58
8.	"From History to Legend"	2:56
9.	"Over the Fence"	4:11
10.	"We Are the Flank"	2:15
11.	"Charging Up the Hill"	2:23
12.	"Dixie"	2:26
13.	"General Lee's Solitude"	3:41
14.	"Battle At Devils Den"	1:46
15.	"Killer Angel"	4:42
16.	"March to Mortality (Pickett's Charge)"	3:18
17.	"Kathleen Mavourneen"	3:17
18.	"Reunion and Finale"	5:45
Total length:		57:17

Two more soundtracks, More Songs and Music From Gettysburg and a Deluxe Commemorative Edition, were released as well. The first one included popular songs from the time period and a recitation of the Gettysburg Address by Jeff Daniels, while the second featured the original soundtrack album (above) and a second disc several previously unreleased tracks from the score and the aforementioned recitation. Another score "Armistead is hit" which played when Armistead rallies the division was never released in the soundtrack.

More Songs and Music From Gettysburg
No.	Title	Artist	Length
1.	"Bonnie Blue Flag"	Americus Brass Band	1:38
2.	"Welcome Here Again/Old 1812"		1:15
3.	"Willie Has Gone to War"	John Durant / Sandy Mitchell	1:49
4.	"Year of Jubillo"	Americus Brass Band	1:38
5.	"Nick Malone"	John Durant / Sandy Mitchell	1:22
6.	"Frog in the Well"		1:15
7.	"Just Before the Battle, Mother"	John Durant / Sandy Mitchell	2:08
8.	"Dixie"	Americus Brass Band	1:31
9.	"La Belle Catherine"	John Durant / Sandy Mitchell	1:30
10.	"The Campbells Are Coming"		1:10
11.	"Amazing Grace"	Americus Brass Band	2:31
12.	"The Fall of Paris"		1:52
13.	"Home Sweet Home"	John Durant / Sandy Mitchell	1:53
14.	"Battle Hymn of the Republic"	Americus Brass Band	1:38
15.	"Stonewall Jackson's Way"		1:09
16.	"Do They Miss Me at Home"	John Durant / Sandy Mitchell	2:32
17.	"Yankee Doodle"		1:14
18.	"Kathleen Mavourneen"	Meir Finklestein / Grant Geissman	2:25
19.	"The Gettysburg Address"	Jeff Daniels	2:29

== Release ==
The miniseries was set to air on TNT, but when Ted Turner saw part of the film during post-production, he realized it was much bigger than a miniseries and decided to release the film theatrically. The film was distributed by New Line Cinema which Turner had just acquired. Only released to 248 theaters at its widest release and limited to just one or two showings per day because of its length, the film still managed to gross $12,769,960 at the box office. It would go on to become an all-time high seller on the VHS and DVD market, and has become a staple of classroom history lessons. Its June 1994 broadcast television premiere, on TNT, garnered over 34 million viewers, a record for cable television.

One of the longest films ever released by a Hollywood studio, Gettysburg runs 254 minutes (4 hours, 14 minutes) on VHS and DVD. A "Director's Cut", 271-minute (4 hours, 31 minutes), with several extended or added scenes, was produced and sold as a part of a special "Collector's Edition" released on DVD and Blu-ray in 2011, to coincide with the 150th commemoration of the beginning of the Civil War in April 1861. It was also released in the UK by the Premium Collection as a DVD and Blu-ray combo which includes the Directors extended version and is number 21 in the collection.

== Reception ==
Gettysburg received an 82% "Fresh" score with an average rating of 7.6/10 on the review aggregator Rotten Tomatoes, based on 22 reviews. The site's consensus states: "Gettysburg's reverent approach to history is balanced with the committed work of a talented cast - and the hard-hitting dramatization of a bloody turning point in the Civil War."

Roger Ebert of the Chicago Sun-Times gave the film three out of four stars, stating, "This is a film that Civil War buffs will find indispensable, even if others might find it interminable." Ebert said that despite his initial indifference, he left the film with a new understanding of the Civil War, and that he felt Jeff Daniels deserved an Oscar nomination for his performance. Ebert accordingly gave the film a "thumbs-up" on Siskel & Ebert, while Gene Siskel gave it a "thumbs-down", saying the film was "bloated Southern propaganda". He, however, also praised Daniels's performance and recommended his nomination for an Oscar.

=== Accolades ===
Year	Award	Category	Recipients	Result	Ref.
1993	Chicago Film Critics Association Awards	Best Supporting Actor	Jeff Daniels	Nominated	
1994	Stinkers Bad Movie Awards	Worst Fake Beards	Gettysburg (New Line Cinema)	Won	

== Prequel ==
Gods and Generals, a prequel based on the 1996 novel of the same name by Jeff Shaara (Michael Shaara's son), was released in 2003. It was also written and directed by Ronald F. Maxwell and featured many returning cast members, including Jeff Daniels as Joshua Chamberlain, Kevin Conway as Buster Kilrain, and C. Thomas Howell as Thomas Chamberlain. Stephen Lang, who portrayed George Pickett in the first film, also returned, but in the role of Stonewall Jackson after scheduling conflicts prevented Russell Crowe from taking the part. Billy Campbell, who portrayed Andrew Lewis Pitzer in Gettysburg, replaced Lang as Pickett. New cast members included Robert Duvall as Robert E. Lee, replacing Martin Sheen.

The film received negative reviews from critics and was a commercial failure, grossing $12.8 million on a $56 million budget.

== Unproduced sequel ==
Originally intended to form part of a trilogy, a third film to be titled The Last Full Measure presenting the end of the American Civil War was proposed, but it never went beyond the planning stage.
