= Final Storm =

Final Storm may refer to:

- A Final Storm, 2010 album by Swedish post-rock band Khoma
- The Final Storm (film), 2010 film directed by Uwe Boll
- The Final Storm (Jeff Shaara novel), 2011 novel by Jeff Shaara
