= Shaara =

Shaara is a surname. Notable people with the surname include:

- Michael Shaara (1928–1988), American writer of science fiction, sports fiction, and historical fiction
- Jeff Shaara (born 1952), American novelist
