= Gods and Generals (film) =

- Theatrical release poster
- Directed by: Ronald F. Maxwell
- Screenplay by: Ronald F. Maxwell
- Based on: Gods and Generals (1996 novel) by Jeff Shaara
- Produced by: Moctesuma Esparza; Robert A. Katz; Mace Neufeld; Robert Rehme
- Starring: Jeff Daniels; Stephen Lang; Robert Duvall; Mira Sorvino; Kevin Conway; C. Thomas Howell; Frankie Faison
- Cinematography: Kees Van Oostrum
- Edited by: Corky Ehlers
- Music by: John Frizzell; Randy Edelman
- Production company: Ted Turner Pictures
- Distributed by: Warner Bros. Pictures
- Release date: February 21, 2003
- Running time: 219 minutes 280 minutes (Director's cut)
- Country: United States
- Language: English
- Budget: $56 million
- Box office: $12.8 million

Gods and Generals is a 2003 American epic war drama film written and directed by Ronald F. Maxwell. It is adapted from the 1996 novel by Jeffrey Shaara and prequel to Maxwell's 1993 film Gettysburg. The film follows the story of Confederate general Stonewall Jackson from the beginning of the American Civil War to his death at the Battle of Chancellorsville. It stars Stephen Lang as Jackson, Jeff Daniels as Lieutenant Colonel Joshua Chamberlain and Robert Duvall as General Robert E. Lee. The cast also features Mira Sorvino, Kevin Conway, C. Thomas Howell and Frankie Faison.

Most of the film was personally financed by media mogul Ted Turner. Originally running over five hours in length, the film was cut by an hour and a half for its 2003 theatrical release, with the full "Extended Director's Cut" being released eight years later in 2011.

The film was released by Warner Bros. Pictures on February 21, 2003, and was both a critical and commercial failure, grossing $12.8 million against a $56 million budget. Although film critics complimented its performances and historically accurate details such as costumes, they criticized its length, pacing, and screenplay. The film was also heavily criticized by both critics and historians for its "pro-Confederate slant". The Southern Poverty Law Center, as well as numerous writers and historians, said that the film endorsed the "Lost Cause" myth.

Both Shaara and Maxwell expressed displeasure at the theatrical edition of the film, and its poor returns forced Turner to cancel Maxwell's planned adaptation of Shaara's final Civil War novel The Last Full Measure.

== Plot ==
Colonel Robert E. Lee resigns from the Union army as Virginia votes to secede from the Union and join the Confederacy, beginning the Civil War. Major Jackson, who is a professor at Virginia Military Institute in Lexington at the outset of the war, leaves his family behind to fight in the Battle of Manassas. Jackson is asked by a retreating General Barnard Bee for assistance against the Federal army who is pursuing them after a brief stand on Matthews Hill. In rallying his shaken troops, Bee launches the name of Stonewall into history and the Confederate Army routs the Federals at Henry House Hill. Jackson maintains steadfast discipline in his ranks during the battle despite suffering a wound to his left hand from a spent ball.

Meanwhile, Chamberlain makes his transition from teacher to military officer and practices drilling his soldiers and is taught military tactics by Col. Adelbert Ames, the commander of the 20th Maine Volunteer Infantry Regiment. He is called to battle at the Battle of Fredericksburg. The Southern forces lead a fighting retreat as the Union army crosses the river to storm and loot Fredericksburg. Outside the city, Lee, James Longstreet and Jackson have prepared an elaborate defense on Marye's Heights outside the town, and the movie focuses on Confederate defenses behind a formidable stone wall. Several Union brigades, including the Irish Brigade, attempt to cross an open field and attack the wall, but are thrown back with heavy losses by Confederate rifle and artillery fire. At one point, two Irish units are forced into battle against one another, to the anguish of a Southern Irishman who believes he is killing his kin. Chamberlain leads an unsuccessful attack against Longstreet's defenses, led by Brig. Gen. Lewis Armistead and finds his unit pinned down in the open field. He survives by shielding himself with a corpse until nightfall; eventually he and surviving members of 20th Maine are ordered to retreat and spend two nights on the battlefield, sleeping with the dead. Chamberlain and the defeated Union soldiers depart Fredericksburg. Jackson and Lee return to the city, and Lee is confronted by an angry citizen whose house has been destroyed by Union artillery.

Jackson spends the rest of the winter at a local plantation, Moss Neck Manor, where he develops a friendship with Jane Corbin, a young girl who lives there. Later, Jackson discovers that Jane has died from scarlet fever and he begins to cry. Jackson's adjutant asks why he weeps for this child but not for the thousands of dead soldiers, and Dr. Hunter McGuire states that Jackson is weeping for everyone. Jackson is soon reunited with his wife and newborn child just before the Battle of Chancellorsville.

Outside Chancellorsville, Lee identifies that the Army of Northern Virginia faces an opposing force almost twice their size. Jackson calls upon his chaplain, Beverly Tucker Lacy who knows the area, and asks him to find a route by which the Confederate forces can infiltrate in secret. Jackson then leads his forces in a surprise attack on an unprepared Union 11th Corps. Although his men initially rout the opponents, they quickly become confused in the melee, and Jackson's attack is stalled. While scouting a path at night, Jackson is caught in no-mans-land between the two armies and badly wounded by his own men, who had mistaken him and his staff for Union cavalry. During his evacuation, his litter bearers are targeted by artillery and drop Jackson on the ground. He is then taken to a field hospital where his arm is amputated. Lee remarks that while Jackson has lost his left arm, he (Lee) has lost his right. Jackson dies shortly after of pneumonia he had contracted during recovery. Jackson's body is returned to Lexington, accompanied by VMI Cadets and covered by the new Confederate flag.

== Cast ==
=== Confederate Army (by rank) ===
- Robert Duvall as General Robert E. Lee
- Stephen Lang as Lieutenant General Stonewall Jackson
- Bruce Boxleitner as Lieutenant General James Longstreet
- W. Morgan Sheppard as Major General Isaac R. Trimble
- William Sanderson as Major General A.P. Hill
- Billy Campbell as Major General George Pickett
- Patrick Gorman as Major General John Bell Hood
- John Castle as Brigadier General William N. Pendleton
- John Prosky as Brigadier General Lewis A. Armistead
- Royce D. Applegate as Brigadier General James L. Kemper
- Lester Kinsolving as Brigadier General William Barksdale
- Jonathon Demers as Brigadier General Richard S. Ewell
- Andrew Prine as Brigadier General Richard B. Garnett
- J. Scott Watkins as Brigadier General Raleigh E. Colston
- Fred Griffith as Brigadier General Robert Rodes
- James Patrick Stuart as Colonel Edward Porter Alexander
- Joseph Fuqua as Lieutenant Colonel J.E.B. Stuart
- Matt Lindquist as Lieutenant Colonel Heros von Borcke
- Ted Turner as Lieutenant Colonel Waller T. Patton
- Bo Brinkman as Major Walter H. Taylor
- Jeremy London as Captain Alexander "Sandie" Pendleton
- Keith Allison as Captain James White

=== United States Army (by rank) ===
- Alex Hyde-White as Major General Ambrose E. Burnside
- Carsten Nørgaard as Major General Darius Nash Couch
- Brian Mallon as Brigadier General and later Major General Winfield Scott Hancock
- James Garrett as Brigadier General John C. Caldwell
- Matt Letscher as Colonel Adelbert Ames (20th Maine)
- Jeff Daniels as Lieutenant Colonel Joshua Lawrence Chamberlain (20th Maine)
- Tim O'Hare as Lieutenant Colonel St. Clair Augustine Mulholland (116th Pennsylvania)
- Jonathan Maxwell as Captain Ellis Spear (20th Maine)
- Kevin Conway as Sergeant Buster Kilrain (20th Maine)
- C. Thomas Howell as Sergeant and later Lieutenant Thomas Chamberlain (20th Maine), brother of Joshua

=== Civilians ===
- Cooper Huckabee as Henry Thomas Harrison, a Confederate spy and friend of John Wilkes Booth
- Mira Sorvino as Fanny Chamberlain, wife of Joshua Chamberlain
- Malachy McCourt as Francis Preston Blair, journalist & editor
- Kali Rocha as Anna Jackson, wife of Stonewall Jackson
- David Carpenter as Reverend Tucker Lacy
- Karen Hochstetter as Roberta Corbin
- Christie Lynn Smith as Catherine Corbin
- Lydia Jordan as Janie Corbin
- Martin Clark as Dr. George Junkin
- Damon Kirsche as Harry McCarthy, Irish author of The Bonnie Blue Flag song
- Dana Stackpole as Lottie Estelle, a dancer at the performance of The Bonnie Blue Flag

=== Slaves ===
- Donzaleigh Abernathy as Martha, an enslaved woman
- Frankie Faison as Jim Lewis, an enslaved cook

== Production ==
Ted Turner originally pitched an adaption of Gods and Generals to Warner Bros. Pictures in 2000 and decided to personally finance it after they turned him down. The final cost of the film was $60 million for the production and $30 million for the distribution of it, making it one of the most expensive independent films ever produced.

Turner has a cameo in the film as Colonel Waller T. Patton. Colonel Patton, the great-uncle of George S. Patton, was mortally wounded at Gettysburg, a scene depicted in the movie Gettysburg. United States Senators George Allen (R-Virginia) and Robert Byrd (D-West Virginia) also have cameo roles, both playing Confederate officers, and Phil Gramm (R-Texas) appears as a member of the Virginia Legislature early in the film. Rep. Dana Rohrabacher (R-California) plays a Union officer, and then-representative Ed Markey (D-Massachusetts) appears as an Irish Brigade officer.

=== Casting ===
Russell Crowe was the original choice to play Stonewall Jackson, but scheduling conflicts prevented his availability in the summer and fall of 2001 when the movie was filmed. Stephen Lang had begun to reprise his role as George Pickett, but instead was asked to fill in the role of Jackson. Billy Campbell, who had played a 44th New York lieutenant in Gettysburg was called in to hastily replace Lang in the role of Pickett.

Although Tom Berenger desired to reprise his Gettysburg role as James Longstreet (which he called his favorite role) he was unavailable because of scheduling difficulties. Bruce Boxleitner was instead cast in the role. Darius N. Couch was portrayed by actor Carsten Norgaard. Martin Sheen was prevented from reprising his role as Lee due to contractual obligations to The West Wing and was recast with Robert Duvall, who had been the first choice for the role before deciding to appear in Stalin instead.

David Carpenter, who portrayed Colonel Thomas Devin in Gettysburg, was cast as Reverend Tucker Lacy. The two rebel privates who develop a friendship throughout the film were played by Bo Greigh (who swaps tobacco for coffee with a Union soldier on Christmas) as well as Trent Walker who played Private McClintock and had previously appeared in the film Gettysburg as the "I'm fighting for my rights" rebel prisoner.

=== Filming ===
The film was shot in Virginia's Shenandoah Valley, western Maryland, and in the Eastern Panhandle of West Virginia. Actual historic locations in the film include Virginia Military Institute and Washington & Lee University, known as Washington College during the Civil War.

Most of the extras were American Civil War reenactors, who provided their own equipment and worked without pay. Among them, 2nd South Carolina String Band portrays the players of "The Bonnie Blue Flag" during a troops entertainment music show. In exchange, Ted Turner agreed to donate $500,000 to Civil War battlefield preservation.

=== Post-production ===
Once production finished, the film was over five hours long. During post-production, Maxwell, Warner Bros. executives, and Turner debated on whether to release the film as two parts over two years or to cut the material into a single film. After test screening in 2002, Maxwell decided to cut the theatrical release to 3 hours and 40 minutes in order to focus on Stonewall Jackson's story arc. Maxwell intended for the full version to be released as a miniseries on TNT and home video a few months after the theatrical release.

The film's failure at the box office also caused Turner, who at the time was losing much of his wealth after the AOL-Time Warner merger and estimated his investment in the film to be worth 15 percent of his assets, to cancel his and Maxwell's plans to adapt the third book in the Shaara family's Civil War trilogy The Last Full Measure.

== Extended director's cut ==
The extended director's cut was released for Blu-ray Disc on May 24, 2011. The film also received special screenings across the country to commemorate the anniversaries of important Civil War battles, starting with a July 22, 2011, presentation at George Mason University to commemorate the 150th anniversary of the First Battle of Bull Run.

Among the footage edited includes a sub-plot which follows John Wilkes Booth, the famous actor who would eventually assassinate President Abraham Lincoln. One scene towards the end of the extended cut of the film features Chamberlain and his wife, Fanny, attending a production of Shakespeare's Julius Caesar in which Booth plays Marcus Junius Brutus. Chamberlain and his wife have a conversation with Booth and his fellow actors following the end of the play. Another scene cut from the film features a performance in Washington, D.C. in which Booth stars in Macbeth, which is being seen by President Lincoln. When he gives the famous "dagger of the mind" soliloquy, he looks directly at Lincoln while reciting it. Later, when Booth is offered the chance to meet with Lincoln, he refuses.

A sequence dealing with the Battle of Antietam was removed from the film. The battle was seen mostly from the perspectives of Jackson (who played a major strategic role in the battle) and Chamberlain (whose corps was held in reserve). In the Director's Cut the entire sequence at Antietam is shown; the Antietam battle scenes mostly depict the fighting in Miller's Cornfield, where soldiers from the opposite sides fired at each other from just a few meters away.

== Soundtrack ==
In 2003, the film score was composed by John Frizzell, with some minor contributions by Randy Edelman, who composed the score for the previous Gettysburg. The soundtrack is notable for containing a new song commissioned for the movie and written and performed by Bob Dylan, "Cross the Green Mountain". The track was later included on the compilation album The Bootleg Series Vol. 8: Tell Tale Signs. The music of the 2nd South Carolina String Band also appears on the soundtrack.

All tracks are written by John Frizzell, except where noted.

No.	Title	Length
1.	"Going Home" (Performed by Mary Fahl)	3:56
2.	"Gods and Generals"	3:42
3.	"You Must Not Worry for Us"	2:09
4.	"Loved I Not Honor More"	3:13
5.	"Lexington is My Home"	1:23
6.	"The School of the Soldier"	3:58
7.	"Go to their Graves Like Beds"	2:24
8.	"My Heart Shall Not Fear"	1:46
9.	"These Brave Irishmen"	2:51
10.	"To the Stone Wall"	3:41
11.	"You'll Thank Me in the Morning"	3:20
12.	"The First Crop of Corn"	3:26
13.	"My Home is Virginia"	4:24
14.	"No Photographs"	2:53
15.	"VMI Will Be Heard from Today"	2:42
16.	"Too Much Sugar"	1:56
17.	"Let Us Cross the River"	2:48
18.	"The Soldier's Return"	2:02
19.	"Cross the Green Mountain" (performed by Bob Dylan)	8:14

== Video game ==
A video game based on the movie was released on March 1, 2003. It was developed by Activision Value and published by Activision.

== Reception ==
=== Critical response ===
Review aggregator Rotten Tomatoes lists an 8% approval rating based on 121 reviews, with an average rating of 3.60/10. The critical consensus reads, "Filled with two-dimensional characters and pompous self-righteousness, Gods and Generals is a long, tedious sit. Some may also take offense at the pro-Confederate slant." Metacritic gives the film a score of 30 out of 100 based on 29 reviews, indicating "generally unfavorable" reviews. Audiences polled by CinemaScore gave the film an average grade of "B+" on an A+ to F scale.

Film critic Roger Ebert gave the film one and a half out of four stars. He described it as "a Civil War movie that Trent Lott might enjoy" and said, "If World War II were handled this way, there'd be hell to pay." He also faulted the film for its music and "pithy quotations".

Maxwell blamed the decision to cut the film for a single theatrical release as the cause of its failure, saying "because we had to take so much out, I must confess the story-telling became disjointed in a way that we just couldn't completely fix."

Some conservative and right-wing political commentators defended the film's narrative. Phyllis Schlafly called it "an epic movie that presents truthful history rather than fiction or politically-correct revisionism" and promoted it as a counter-narrative to public school history classes. The American Enterprise called it "not only the finest movie ever made about the Civil War, it is also the best American historical film. Period."

==== Accolades ====
Date	Award	Category	Recipients	Result	Ref.
2004	MovieGuide Awards	Most Inspirational Movie Acting	Stephen Lang	Won	
February 21, 2004	Satellite Awards	Best Original Song	"Cross the Green Mountain" by Bob Dylan	Nominated	
February 22, 2004	Stinkers Bad Movie Awards	Worst Song or Song Performance in a Film or Its End Credits	"Cross the Green Mountain" by Bob Dylan	Nominated	
February 22, 2004	Stinkers Bad Movie Awards	Worst On-Screen Couple	Stephen Lang and Lydia Jordan	Nominated	
February 22, 2004	Stinkers Bad Movie Awards	The Spencer Breslin Award (for Worst Performance by a Child in a Featured Role)	Lydia Jordan	Nominated	
February 28, 2004	Golden Reel Award	Best Sound Editing in a Feature - Music - Feature Film	Lisa Jaime	Nominated	

=== Historians' response ===
Gods and Generals is widely viewed as championing the Lost Cause ideology by creating a presentation more favorable to the Confederacy. Writing in The Journal of American History, historian Steven E. Woodworth derided the movie as a modern-day telling of Lost Cause mythology. Woodworth called the movie "the most pro-Confederate film since Birth of a Nation, a veritable celluloid celebration of slavery and treason." He summed up his reasons for disliking the movie by saying:

Gods and Generals brings to the big screen the major themes of Lost Cause mythology that professional historians have been working for half a century to combat. In the world of Gods and Generals, slavery has nothing to do with the Confederate cause. Instead, the Confederates are nobly fighting for, rather than against, freedom, as viewers are reminded again and again by one white southern character after another.

Woodworth criticized the portrayal of slaves as being "generally happy" with their condition. He also criticizes the relative lack of attention given to the motivations of Union soldiers fighting in the war. He excoriates the film for allegedly implying, in agreement with Lost Cause mythology, that the South was more "sincerely Christian." Woodworth concludes that the film, through "judicial omission," presents "a distorted view of the Civil War."

Historian William B. Feis similarly criticized the director's decision "to champion the more simplistic-and sanitized-interpretations found in post-war "Lost Cause" mythology". Writing for the Southern Poverty Law Center, George Ewert wrote that the film "is part of a growing movement that seeks to rewrite the history of the American South, downplaying slavery and the economic system that it sustained." Ewert also noted that white-supremacist groups such as the League of the South praised the film.

Filmmaker and history educator Andrew Rakich called the film "the most offensive Civil War movie since The Birth of a Nation," while also criticizing its filmmaking qualities.

=== Author's response ===
Author Jeff Shaara originally liked the movie, but he later said that he was disappointed it was not more similar to the book. He said, "It's enormously different, it's radically different from the book. There are characters in the film that do not exist in the book, and a great many characters in the book that never made it to the film. It's just an entirely different story, and I have to tell you, I've heard from literally thousands of people through my website, and I get emails every day and try to be as accessible as I can, and the overwhelming percentage of those that wrote me said, 'How could you let them butcher your book like that?' I have no answer to that because I had no control or power to change what came up on the screen."
