= The Glorious Cause (novel) =

2002 novel by Jeff Shaara

- First edition
- Author: Jeff Shaara
- Cover artist: Howard Pyle; Nation Makers (1903)
- Language: English
- Series: American Revolution series
- Genre: Historical novel
- Publisher: Ballantine Books
- Publication date: 2002
- Publication place: United States
- Media type: Print (Paperback)
- Pages: 680 pp
- ISBN: 0-345-42758-0
- OCLC: 52427791
- Preceded by: Rise to Rebellion

The Glorious Cause is a historical novel by author Jeff Shaara, a sequel to Rise to Rebellion and the conclusion to Shaara's retelling of the American Revolution.

The Glorious Cause consists of a set of third-person narratives following the experiences of several notable figures in the American Revolution, including George Washington, Benjamin Franklin, and Charles Cornwallis, throughout the years of the war.

One critic suggested that "the reader with a passing interest in ... tactical mysteries will find the answers in The Glorious Cause, but little else."
