= Cooper Huckabee =

American film and television actor (born 1951)

- Born: Thomas Cooper Huckabee; May 8, 1951 (age 75); Mobile, Alabama, U.S.
- Occupation: Actor
- Years active: 1976–present

Thomas Cooper Huckabee (born May 8, 1951) is an American film and television actor who appeared in The Funhouse, Urban Cowboy, and as Harrison in the 1993 film Gettysburg, among other roles.

== Career ==
Huckabee played Buzz, one of the leading roles, in The Funhouse. He was Marshall, John Travolta's buddy in Urban Cowboy. He shared a starring role in the 1982 CBS made-for-TV movie Country Gold made in Nashville which also featured Loni Anderson, Linda Hamilton, and Earl Holliman. He was Henry Thomas Harrison, the spy, in Gettysburg.

He has also had several guest appearances on various TV series, including ER and The Shield. Huckabee appeared as Euple Byrd, the first husband of country music legend Tammy Wynette in the made-for-TV movie, Stand by Your Man. Huckabee also appeared in The Killers video for "A Dustland Fairytale". Huckabee had a recurring role in the TV series True Blood as Joe Lee Mickens.

== TV and filmography ==
Film and television
Year	Title	Role	Notes
1976	Little House on the Prairie	Herman Stone	Season 2 Episode #17: "Troublemaker"
1977	Dallas	Payton	CBS TV Mini-Series: Season 1, Episode 4
1977	Murder at the World Series	Frank Gresham	
1978	Foul Play	Sandy	
1978	Hawaii Five-O	Armitage	Episode: "The Bark and the Bite"
1978	The Life and Times of Grizzly Adams	John Ransom	Episode: "The Runaway"
1980	Joni	Dick Filbert	
1980	Urban Cowboy	Marshall	
1981	The Funhouse	Buzz	
1981	Stand by Your Man	Euple Byrd	
1981	The Pursuit of D. B. Cooper	Homer	
	The Blue and the Gray	Matthew Geyser	TV miniseries
1982	Country Gold	Reilly Sears	CBS TV movie
1983	Little House: Look Back to Yesterday	Vance Reed	
1985	Chase	Coy	
1985	MacGyver	Bill Farren	Episode: "Hellfire"
1986	Eye of the Tiger	Roger	
1987	The Curse	Dr. Allen Forbes	
1989	Cohen and Tate	Jeff Knight	
1990	Night Eyes	Ernie	
1992	Love Field	Deputy Swinson	
1993	Gettysburg	Henry Thomas Harrison	
1994	Bad Girls	Deputy Earl	
1997	Turbulence	Wing Commander W. Hadfield	
1999	The General's Daughter	Colonel Weems	
2000	Space Cowboys	Trajectory Engineer	
2003	Gods and Generals	Henry Thomas Harrison	reprised role from Gettysburg
2009	Staunton Hill	Burgh	
2009	Dexter	Joe Nix	
2010	True Blood	Joe Lee Mickens	7 episodes
2012	Django Unchained	Roger "Lil Raj" Brittle	
2013	Criminal Minds	Raoul Whalen	Episode: "Alchemy"
2014	Longmire	George Linder	Episode: "Harvest"
2015	Band of Robbers	Muff Potter	
2016	Pee-wee's Big Holiday	Minister	
2016	"The Last Ship (TV series)"	Bob	Season 3, Episode 12 "Resistance"
2016	If Loving You is Wrong	Rusty	6 episodes
2019	NCIS	Kyle Larson	Episode: "Judge, Jury..."
2020	Tales from the Hood 3	Denton Wilbury	
