= Henry Thomas Harrison =

Confederate spy during the American Civil War

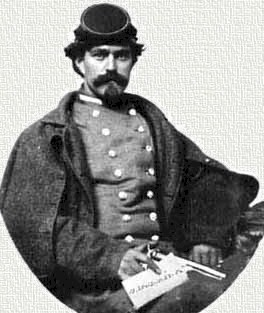
- Born: April 23, 1832; Nashville, Tennessee, United States
- Died: October 28, 1923 (aged 91); Covington, Kentucky, United States
- Occupations: Spy, detective, prospector
- Known for: Spying for the Confederate States of America
- Spouse: Laura Broders
- Military career
- Allegiance: Confederate States
- Branch: Confederate States Army
- Unit: 12th Mississippi Infantry
- Conflicts: American Civil War

Henry Thomas Harrison (April 23, 1832 – October 28, 1923) was a spy for Confederate Lieutenant General James Longstreet during the American Civil War. He is best known for the information he gave Longstreet and General Robert E. Lee in the Gettysburg campaign, which resulted in Lee converging on Gettysburg, Pennsylvania, thus causing the Battle of Gettysburg in July 1863.

== Early life and early Confederate States Army service ==
Harrison was born in Nashville, Tennessee, on April 23, 1832. He was an actor who did not get many large parts due to his small stature. He did not go to any school. At the start of the Civil War in 1861, at age 29, Harrison joined the Mississippi State Militia as a private.

== Career as a Confederate spy ==
In November 1861, Harrison was discharged from the militia and eventually became a spy for CSA Secretary of War James Seddon. In April 1863, Harrison met Lieutenant General James Longstreet of the Confederate Army of Northern Virginia during the Battle of Suffolk. From that point on, Harrison provided information for Longstreet, which usually proved to be reliable. Also, to maintain the loyalty of his prized spy, Longstreet frequently paid Harrison in U.S. gold coins and/or greenbacks, which were significantly more valuable than Confederate currency.

On the night of June 28, 1863, Harrison accurately reported to Longstreet that the Union Army had moved into Frederick, Maryland, and was moving northward, as well as the fact that Major General Joseph Hooker had been replaced as commander of the United States Army of the Potomac by Major General George Meade. Longstreet passed this information on to General Robert E. Lee, the commander of the Army of Northern Virginia. Lee had never heard of Harrison before and refused to see him when he arrived compliments of Longstreet. However, Longstreet's chief of staff, Moxley Sorrel, confirmed that Harrison "always brought true information." In the end, Harrison's information was plausible enough for Lee to halt his entire army. As a result of Harrison's information, Lee told all of his troops to concentrate in the vicinity of Cashtown, Pennsylvania, eight miles from Gettysburg, thereby triggering the events that led to the Battle of Gettysburg. Lee said after hearing the news from Harrison, "A battle thus became, in a measure, unavoidable."

After Gettysburg, Harrison operated mostly in the North, gathering intelligence while living in New York with his newly wed wife, Laura Broders; none of his future intelligence ever matched the importance of his discovery in the days before the Battle of Gettysburg.

== Post war ==
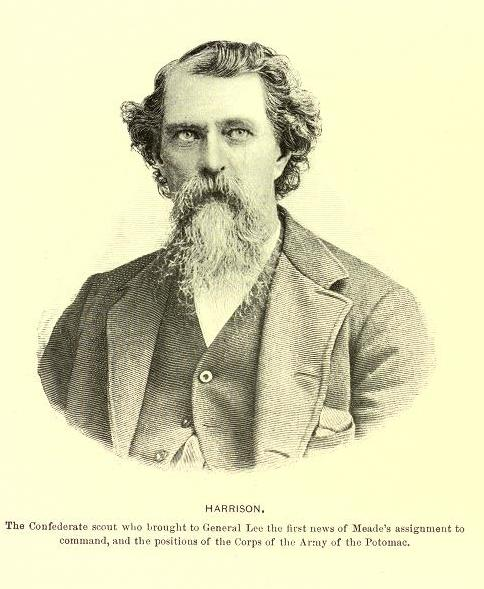
Harrison in later years

After the war, Harrison took his wife and two daughters to Mexico, hoping that the youngest would find better health in the warmer climate due to her asthma. But in 1866, facing marital difficulties, Harrison left Mexico to prospect for gold in Montana. For the period of 1867 to 1892, his exact whereabouts remain unknown. His wife, Laura Broders, along with Harrison's family, hired detectives and searched for him. Eventually, it was assumed that he was dead and she later remarried George Washington Riston, who raised Harrison's children.

Far from being dead, Harrison moved to Cincinnati, Ohio in 1893. In 1901, Harrison got a job in Cincinnati as a detective for the Municipal Reform League. In 1912, he moved to Covington, Kentucky, and applied for a Confederate pension. On October 28, 1923, Harrison died in Covington at the age of 91. He is buried at Highland Cemetery in Fort Mitchell, Kentucky.

== In popular culture ==
Harrison was a major character in Michael Shaara's 1974 historical novel The Killer Angels, and was played by Cooper Huckabee in the film version Gettysburg. Huckabee also portrays Harrison in the director's cut of Gods and Generals, with scenes depicting him in off-stage conversation with John Wilkes Booth.
