= To the Last Man (Shaara novel) =

2004 novel by Jeff Shaara

- Author: Jeff Shaara
- Language: English
- Genre: War; Historical novel
- Publisher: Ballantine Books
- Publication date: 26 October, 2004
- Publication place: United States
- Media type: Print (Hardcover and Paperback)
- Pages: 636 pp (first edition hardcover)
- ISBN: 0-345-46134-7 (first edition hardcover)
- OCLC: 56637102
- Dewey Decimal: 813/.54 22
- LC Class: PS3569.H18 T6 2004b

To the Last Man: A Novel of the First World War (2004) is a historical novel written by Jeff Shaara about the experience of a number of combatants in World War I. The book became a national best seller and received praise from people such as General Tommy Franks.

== Plot summary ==
The novel is based on the arrival of General John J. Pershing with American troops on the Western Front in 1917. Moving in a new direction from Shaara's previous novels, the book focuses not only on generals but also on the everyday American doughboys, including the experiences of a character named Roscoe Temple, and a chapter about a new British recruit who refills the ranks, only to be killed during an attack on the German trenches several hours later.

The book also profiles aviation aces such as Germany's Manfred von Richthofen and America's Raoul Lufbery.

== Awards ==
The novel was recognized with the W.Y. Boyd Literary Award for Excellence in Military Fiction from the American Library Association in 2005.
