= Staunton Hill =

- Directed by: G. Cameron Romero
- Written by: David Rountree
- Produced by: David Rountree
- Starring: Kathy Lamkin; Cristen Coppen; David Rountree; Kiko Ellsworth; Christine Carlo; Paula Rhodes; B.J. Hendricks; Charlie Bodin
- Cinematography: Andrew Mclean
- Music by: Jesper Kyd
- Distributed by: Anchor Bay Entertainment
- Release date: October 6, 2009
- Country: United States
- Language: English

Staunton Hill is a 2009 American horror film directed by G. Cameron Romero and starring Kathy Lamkin, Cristen Coppen, David Rountree, Kiko Ellsworth, Christine Carlo, Paula Rhodes, B.J. Hendricks, Charlie Bodin, Cooper Huckabee, and Sherry Weston. It was filmed in only six weeks.

== Plot ==
In 1969, a group of friends travel through Virginia on their way to Washington, D.C. to participate in protest rallies. They hitchhike to a small rural community and meet Quintin who offers them a ride. While on the backroads, Quintin's truck overheats and they are forced to walk. As night falls they reach a farm and spend the night in a barn. The next morning, they meet the farm's inhabitants and the young travelers get the terrible feeling that something is wrong in Staunton Hill.

The winds of change are blowing across the United States. But on a lonely family property in the Virginia highlands, a maelstrom of evil has been gathering for years. For a group of friends travelling to a rally in D.C., a detour to Staunton's horror farmhouse will tear their young lives apart forever. The sense of impending doom is growing. The clan's horrific harvest is about to begin.
