= 2nd South Carolina String Band =

Historical Music Artist

The 2nd South Carolina String Band was a band of Civil War re-enactors who recreated American popular music of the 1800s with authentic instruments and in period style. The group aimed to perform Civil War music as authentically as possible claiming, "This is the music as it truly sounded to the soldiers of the Civil War".

According to the band's official website, the group formed in August 1989. The founding members—consisting of Joe Ewers, Fred Ewers, John Frayler, Dave Goss and Bob Beeman—were amateurs who played a variety of 19th-century instruments, including banjo, bones, drum, fiddle, guitar, and tambourine. They began by playing informally during re-enactment campaigns. They eventually moved to playing dances and concerts. As the group grew older the roster comprised seven members, including players of the fife, flute, and penny whistle.

The 2nd South Carolina String Band had released six albums through Palmetto Productions. Documentary filmmaker Ken Burns has featured their music in his films Mark Twain and Jazz. The band appears in the film Gods and Generals, directed by Ronald F. Maxwell, and their music appears on the soundtrack. In November 2004, the band received the Stephen Collins Foster Award for their preservation of 19th-century American song. The band's last personnel includes: Joe Ewers (banjo), Fred Ewers (fiddle), Dave Goss (guitar), Bob Beeman (tambourine & bones), Mike Paul (fiddle), Joe Whitney (flute) and Tom DiGiuseppe (banjo).

Past band members have included Greg Adams, (banjo), John Dwyer (percussion), Marty Grody (fife, tin whistle), John Frayler (military drum), and Greg Hernandez (fife).

The band disbanded in 2019.

They reunited for one last concert on November 15, 2024 in Gettysburg, Pennsylvania at the Gettysburg Middle School.

== Discography ==
- The Monmouth Tapes (1991)
- Southern Soldier (1997)
- Hard Road (2001; the best of We're Tenting Tonight (1991) and We are a Band of Brothers (1993))
- In High Cotton (2002)
- Dulcem Melodies (2006)
- Lightning in a Jar [Live] (2008)
- Strike the Tent! (album) (2013)
- Ain't Dead Yet! (2017)

== Videos ==
- The Monmouth Tapes (1991)
- Far, far from home (2000)
- 2nd South Carolina String Band ~ LAST GASP CONCERT part 1 and 2 (2024)
