= Gone for Soldiers =

2000 novel by Jeffrey Shaara

- First edition
- Author: Jeffrey Shaara
- Genre: Historical fiction
- Set in: the Mexican–American War
- Publisher: Ballantine Books
- Publication date: 2000
- Pages: xix, 424 pages
- ISBN: 0345427505
- OCLC: 43434730

Gone for Soldiers is a 2000 historical novel by Jeffrey Shaara about the Mexican–American War. It was written as a standalone novel, but could also be seen as a prequel to the Civil War trilogy written by Shaara and his father, Michael Shaara, introducing some of the key protagonists in the campaigns that first won them fame. The action begins with the Battle of Vera Cruz and follows Winfield Scott and his army as they march toward Mexico City, including the Battle of Cerro Gordo and culminating in the Battle of Chapultepec and the fall of Mexico City.

== Style ==
Most of the story is told from the perspective of two men, Winfield Scott, commander of the American forces, and Robert E. Lee, who rose to prominence in the war, though some chapters also introduce the perspectives of other characters as well, notably Mexican leader Antonio López de Santa Anna, James Longstreet, Thomas Jackson, and Ulysses S. Grant. It is critical of certain American commanders, including William J. Worth, Gideon Pillow, and David E. Twiggs, portraying them as mostly incompetent soldiers, who were little more than political appointees, while the true heroes were the lower-ranking graduates of the United States Military Academy. This idealistic portrayal of the younger officers as they rose to prominence gives little indication that within just a few years they would meet again on the battlefield in the American Civil War.
