= Kees Van Oostrum =

Dutch cinematographer

Kees van Oostrum
- Born: Amsterdam
- Occupation: Cinematographer
- Years active: 1980–present

Kees van Oostrum ASC (born in Amsterdam) is a Dutch cinematographer and director. He served three consecutive terms as president of the American Society of Cinematographers (ASC) from 2016 to 2020. During his career, he has received an ASC Award as well as multiple ASC and Primetime Emmy nominations for his contributions to film and television.

As a director of photography, Van Oostrum's credits include the historic films Gettysburg (1993), Gods and Generals (2003), and Spartacus (2004). In television, his work includes The Fosters (2014-2018) and the miniseries Return to Lonesome Dove (1993) and Miss Rose White (1992), both of which earned him Primetime Emmy nominations for Outstanding Cinematography. Selected directing credits include the Dutch film Bitter Herbs (1985) and the feature A Perfect Man (2013).

During his tenure as ASC president, Van Oostrum was involved in industry discussions regarding the presentation of the Academy Awards, including opposition to a proposal to present the Best Cinematography award during a commercial break; the decision was later reversed.

Beyond his creative work, Van Oostrum is an innovator in motion picture technology. He was a co-developer of the Aerocrane modular camera crane system and has been active in the development of optical tools, including lens expanders, through Optica Magnus. As a chairman at Cooke Optics, Van Oostrum played a role in the development of the Cooke Varotal Zoom lenses and Cooke Optics' expansion in the mirrorless market.

Since 2020, he has been a cinematography professor at the Shanghai Theatre Academy, where he teaches cinematography and participates in international educational exchange programs.
