= Kathy Lamkin =

American actress (1947–2022)

- Born: Kathryn Janel Ramsey; December 10, 1947
- Died: April 4, 2022 (aged 74); Pearland, Texas, U.S.
- Occupation: Actress
- Spouse: Stephen L. Lamkin
- Children: 2

Kathryn Janel Ramsey (December 10, 1947 – April 4, 2022), better known by her stage name Kathy Lamkin, was an American film actress, perhaps best known for her iconic role as The Tea Lady in 2003's The Texas Chainsaw Massacre, and its 2006 prequel film, The Texas Chainsaw Massacre: The Beginning.

== Biography ==
Lamkin was the daughter of James L. Ramsey and Jeneva B. Medearis, and she attended Texas Women's University, where she studied acting. She began her acting career in Houston and made television commercials for use in Texas. In the early 2000s she moved to Los Angeles.

Lamkin was married to Stephen L. Lamkin, an aerospace engineer, and they had two children. She lived in Pearland, Texas, until her death on April 4, 2022.

== Filmography ==
- Neurotic Cabaret (1990)
- Waiting for Guffman (1996)
- The Life of David Gale (2003)
- The Texas Chainsaw Massacre (2003)
- Kiss Kiss Bang Bang (2005)
- The Astronaut Farmer (2006)
- The Texas Chainsaw Massacre: The Beginning (2006)
- In the Valley of Elah (2007)
- The Heartbreak Kid (2007)
- No Country for Old Men (2007)
- Sunshine Cleaning (2008)
- Staunton Hill (2009)
- Psychic Experiment (2010)
- Welcome to the Rileys (2010)
- Expecting Mary (2010)
- Sweetwater (2013)
