= Richard B. Garnett =

American Civil War general (1817–1863)

Richard Brooke Garnett
- Born: November 21, 1817; Essex County, Virginia
- Died: July 3, 1863 (aged 45); Gettysburg, Pennsylvania
- Burial place: Hollywood Cemetery; Richmond, Virginia
- Military career
- Allegiance: United States; Confederate States
- Branch: United States Army; Confederate States Army
- Service years: 1841–61 (USA); 1861–63 (CSA)
- Rank: Captain (USA); Brigadier General (CSA)
- Commands: Stonewall Brigade; Garnett's Brigade, First Division, Army of Northern Virginia
- Conflicts: Mexican–American War; American Civil War: Jackson's Valley Campaign; First Battle of Kernstown; Battle of Antietam; Battle of Fredericksburg; Battle of Gettysburg; Pickett's Charge †

Richard Brooke Garnett (November 21, 1817 – July 3, 1863) was a career United States Army officer and a Confederate general in the American Civil War. He was unjustly court-martialed by Stonewall Jackson for his retreat at the First Battle of Kernstown after Jackson’s poorly planned attack failed. Jackson, who rarely accepted blame for his military mistakes sought to deflect from his defeat by charging Garnett. The charges were quickly dismissed by General Robert E. Lee. Garnett was killed during Pickett's Charge at the Battle of Gettysburg. Some have speculated that Jackson unjust treatment of Garnett led to his death.

== Early life ==
Garnett was born on the "Rose Hill" estate in Essex County, Virginia, the son of William Henry Garnett and Anna Maria Brooke, both of primarily English ancestry. He had a twin brother, William, who died in Norfolk in 1855. He was the cousin of Robert M. T. Hunter as well as Robert Selden Garnett, also a Confederate general, who holds the dubious distinction of being the first general officer killed during the Civil War. Both of the Garnetts graduated from the United States Military Academy in 1841, with Richard standing 29th out of 52 cadets, two spots below Robert. Garnett was commissioned as a second lieutenant in the 6th U.S. Infantry and he served in a variety of posts in Florida, fighting the Seminoles, and then in the West, where he commanded Fort Laramie, rode with the Utah Expedition, and was a noted Indian fighter.

During the Mexican–American War, he served in staff positions in New Orleans, and was promoted to first lieutenant on February 16, 1847. He learned of the outbreak of the Civil War while serving in California as a captain, the rank to which he had been promoted on May 9, 1855. Despite believing strongly that the Union should not be dissolved, he returned to Virginia to fight for his native state and the Confederacy.

== Civil War ==
Garnett resigned his commission in the U.S. Army on May 17, 1861, and entered the Confederate States Army. His first assignment in Virginia was as a major of artillery in May, and then as lieutenant colonel of Cobb's Georgia Legion on August 31. He was promoted to brigadier general on November 14, 1861, and commanded the 1st Brigade of the Valley District of the Confederate Army of the Potomac, which was the brigade originally formed by Thomas J. "Stonewall" Jackson, the Stonewall Brigade; Jackson was now in overall command in the Shenandoah Valley.

During Jackson's Valley Campaign of 1862, Garnett's military career took a downward turn at the First Battle of Kernstown in March. Jackson marched his army 40 miles (64 km) to intercept a portion of the Union Army under Maj. Gen. Nathaniel P. Banks. On March 23, Jackson's cavalry commander, Col. Turner Ashby, brought faulty intelligence that the retreating Union division of Brig. Gen. James Shields had four regiments in the rear outside Winchester, Virginia. Since that force was of comparable size to Jackson's, he ordered Garnett and the Stonewall Brigade to attack. Unfortunately, Shields had a full infantry division on hand, almost 9,000 men, twice the size of Jackson's force. The attack went badly and Garnett, finding his brigade low on ammunition and surrounded by forces attacking from three sides, ordered a retreat. Jackson, who rarely admitted mistakes, was infuriated and accused Garnett of disobeying orders, since he did not have Jackson's permission to retreat. Jackson, well known as a strict disciplinarian, arrested Garnett for "neglect of duty" on April 1 and relieved him of command. Garnett's court-martial started in August 1862, with only Jackson and his aide giving testimony. However the trial was suspended due to the start of Gen. Robert E. Lee's Northern Virginia Campaign and the Second Battle of Bull Run that August.

Lee ordered Jackson to release Garnett from arrest and he was assigned to command the injured George Pickett's brigade in Lt. Gen. James Longstreet's First Corps in the Army of Northern Virginia. Garnett commanded the brigade credibly at the Battle of Antietam in September, after which he assumed permanent command of the brigade on November 26 when Pickett was promoted to divisional command, and at the Battle of Fredericksburg that December. He did not participate in the Battle of Chancellorsville in May 1863 because Longstreet's Corps was assigned duties in Suffolk, Virginia.

Stonewall Jackson was gravely wounded at Chancellorsville and died soon after from pneumonia. Upon Jackson's death, Garnett returned to Richmond where the general's body lay in state. Despite his professional disagreement with Jackson, Garnett set aside any ill will against him and served as a pall bearer along with Longstreet, Richard S. Ewell, and others at his funeral.

=== Gettysburg and death ===
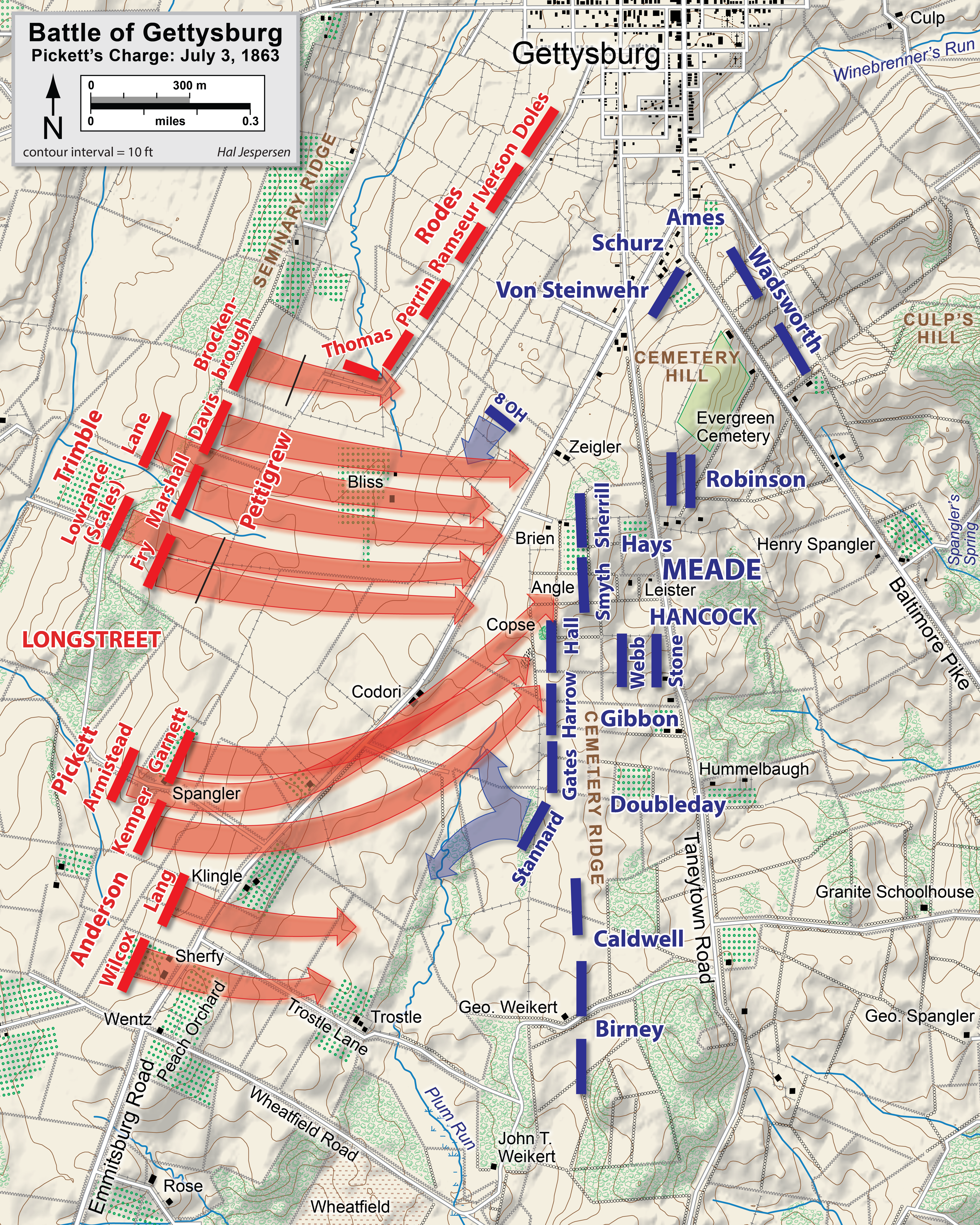
Map of Pickett's Charge, July 3, 1863 Confederate Union

During the Gettysburg campaign, Garnett's brigade continued in the division of George Pickett and, due to the order of march, did not reach the battlefield from Chambersburg, Pennsylvania, until late on the afternoon of July 2, 1863, missing the first two days of the Battle of Gettysburg. Pickett's division was assigned by Gen. Lee to lead a great assault on the Union's center on Cemetery Ridge on July 3. Garnett's brigade was in the front rank of Pickett's division, on the left, next to Brig. Gen. James L. Kemper's brigade. Garnett was in no shape to lead an infantry charge; he was suffering from fever and an injured leg when his horse kicked him and he could not walk. But Garnett yearned to settle the record of his military dishonor from Kernstown, which the aborted court-martial could not. Despite protestations from other officers, Garnett insisted on leading his soldiers into battle on horseback, becoming a conspicuous target for Union riflemen.

Prior to starting out toward the Union defenses on Cemetery Ridge, Garnett conversed with Brig. Gen. Lewis Armistead, another of Pickett's brigade commanders, about the proposed charge. Garnett reportedly said: "This is a desperate thing to attempt" to which Armistead added his prediction that "the slaughter will be terrible."

Garnett got within 20 yards of the "Angle" on Cemetery Ridge before he was killed, a bullet striking him in the head as he waved his hat to urge his men forward. His courier, Private Robert H. Irvine of the 19th Virginia, witnessed his death. Irvine's horse was hit and fell on Garnett, so the private pulled Garnett's body from underneath the animal and retrieved the general's watch, which he gave to the brigade adjutant. There are conflicting stories about whether Garnett's horse, a bay gelding named Red Eye, returned to the Confederate lines. Although Garnett was wearing a new uniform, somehow his body was never identified and he was buried by Union soldiers in a mass grave. Robert K. Krick presumes that his remains were later transferred to Hollywood Cemetery in Richmond. Garnett and Armistead were both killed; Kemper was gravely wounded.

== In memoriam ==
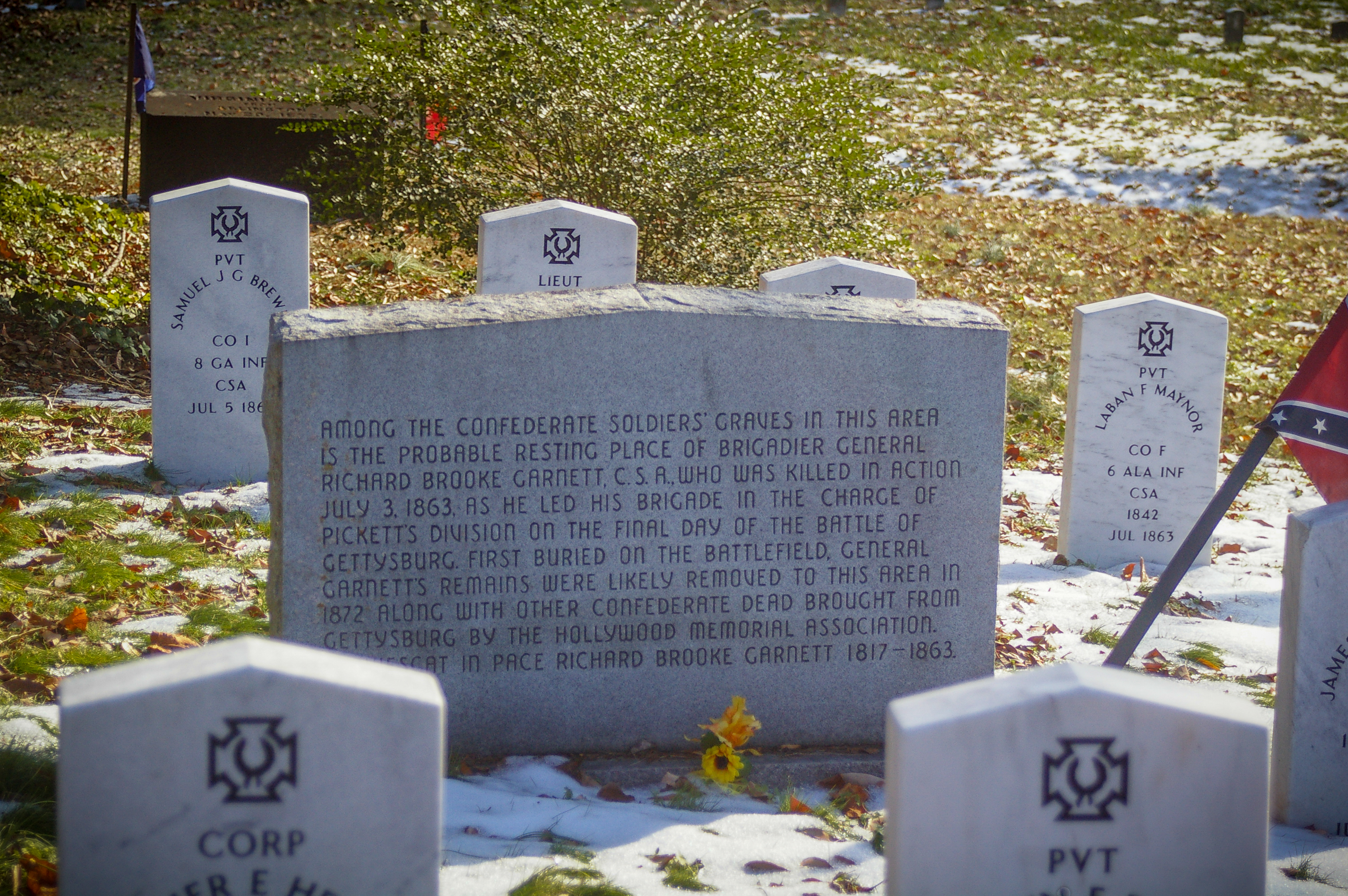
Cenotaph to Richard Garnett in Hollywood Cemetery.

In 1872, remains of Confederate dead were brought from Gettysburg and reinterred to Hollywood Cemetery in Richmond, Virginia. The Hollywood Memorial Association erected a cenotaph in Garnett's honor in 1991, making the assumption that his remains were in this group. Years after the war, Garnett's sword was located in a Baltimore pawnshop and was purchased by former Confederate Brig. Gen. George H. Steuart, who died before he could return it to Garnett's family. It was subsequently returned by Steuart's nephew.

== In popular media ==
Garnett was portrayed by American actor Andrew Prine in the 1993 film Gettysburg, based on Michael Shaara's novel, The Killer Angels. In the movie, Garnett is killed by a close-range cannon shot as Garnett rallies his troops towards the stonewall, and his horse returns to the Confederate lines riderless, perhaps to reflect how his body was never found. He reprised this role in 2003 in film's prequel Gods and Generals, although uncredited and without any dialog.

== Disputed photograph ==
A photograph long believed to be one of only two photographs of Garnett, is, in fact, a photograph of his cousin, Robert Selden Garnett, as indicated by the script along the black edge, which, when mirrored, reads "R.S. Garnett 6589." The bottom photograph of this article is possibly the only photograph known, although it is likely also a photograph of Robert Garnett, as Richard B. Garnett was described by contemporaries as a fair-haired man with blue eyes. A letter to the editor of America's Civil War magazine claims that the Library of Congress possesses a photograph of Richard B. Garnett that has been mislabeled as "Franklin Gardner, CSA, Born N.Y.C."

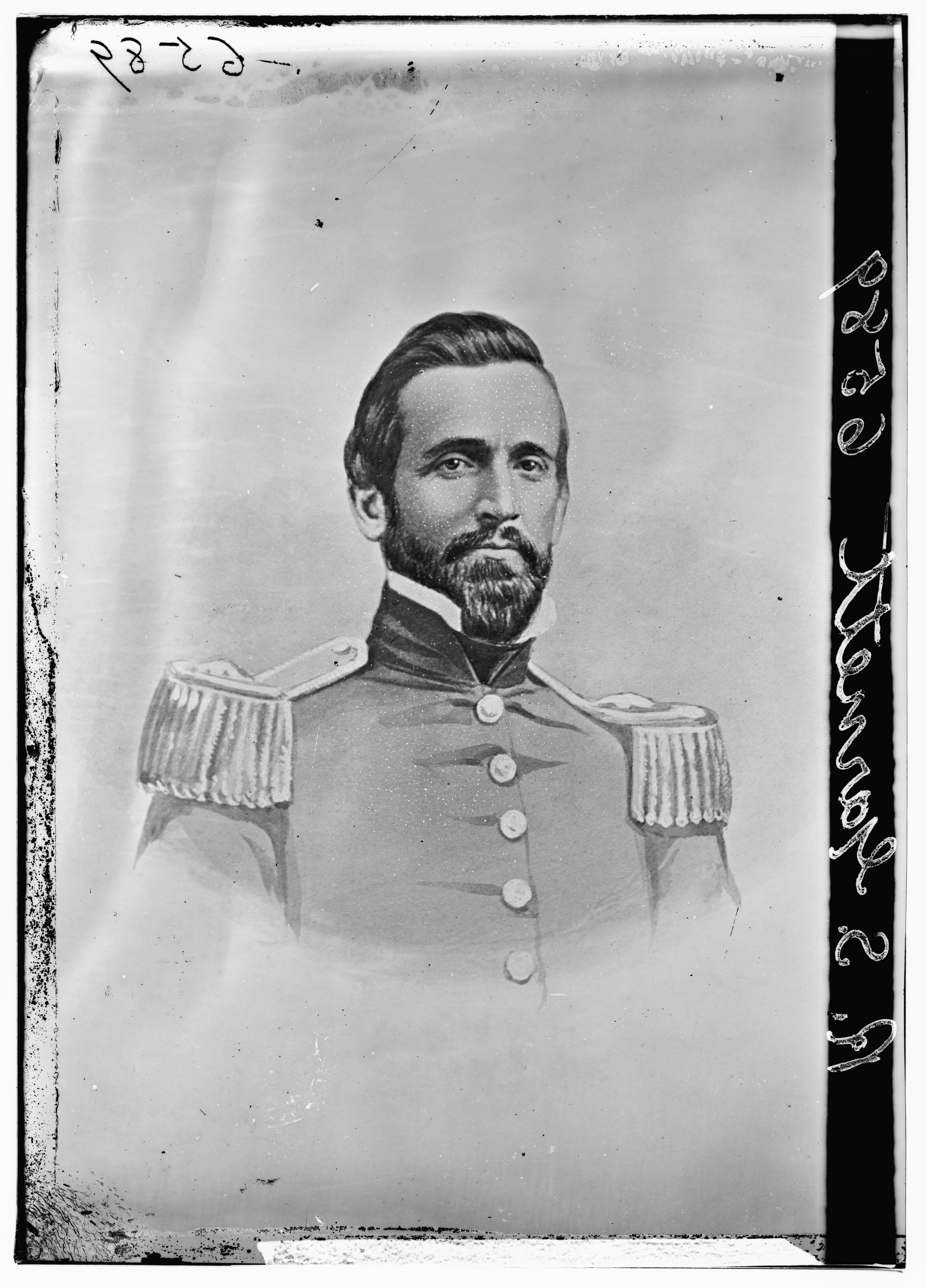
This image, commonly identified as of Richard B. Garnett, is actually of Robert Selden Garnett, as can be noted by the reversed script on the right border of the image.

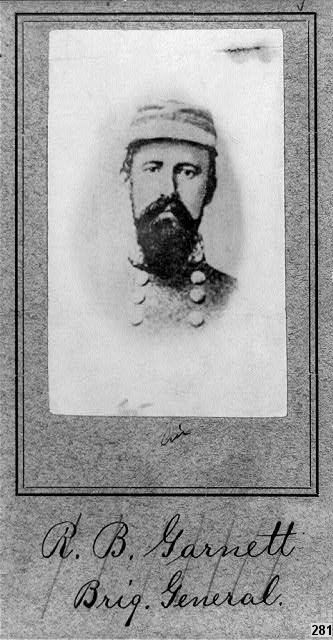
This photograph, labeled as Brig. General Garnett, is the most likely surviving photograph, if one exists. It is likely, however, that this is either Robert Garnett or another cousin, as Richard Garnett was described as fair-haired and blue eyed.

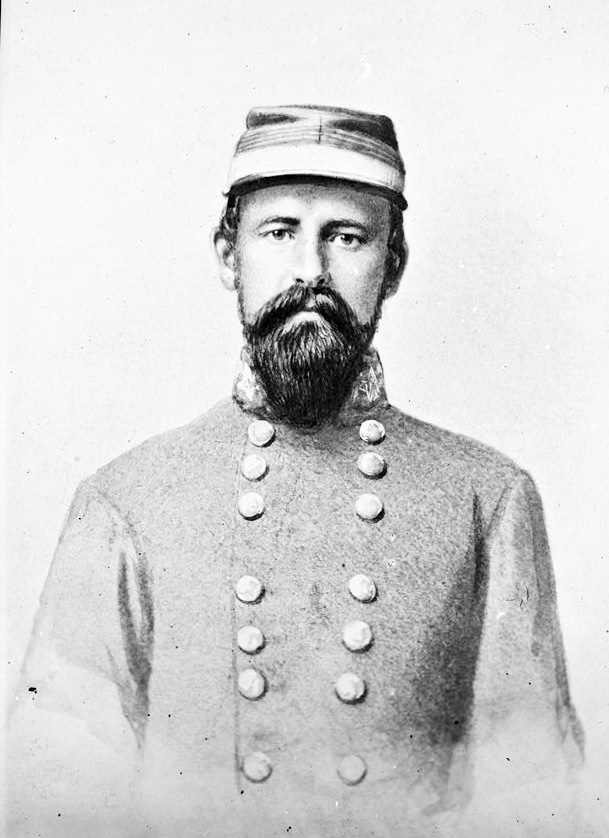
Library of Congress photograph labeled "Franklin Gardner, CSA, Born N.Y.C.," which may actually be Richard B. Garnett

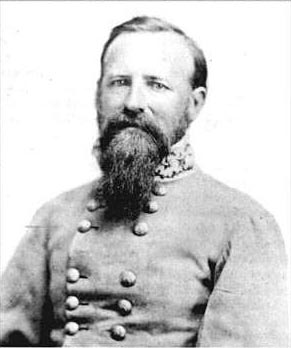
"Franklin Gardner" picture.

== See also ==
- List of American Civil War generals (Confederate)
