= The Steel Wave =

2008 novel by Jeff Shaara

The Steel Wave: A Novel of World War II
- First edition
- Author: Jeff Shaara
- Language: English
- Genre: War; Historical fiction
- Publisher: Ballantine Books
- Publication date: May 13, 2008
- Publication place: United States
- Media type: Print; Tape; Audio
- Pages: 525
- ISBN: 978-0-7393-2784-5
- Preceded by: The Rising Tide
- Followed by: No Less Than Victory

The Steel Wave: A Novel of World War II is a historical novel written by Jeff Shaara about Operation Overlord. The book is the second book in a trilogy written by Shaara.

The novel begins in January 1944, nearly six months before the invasion of Normandy. Nearly half of the novel deals with General Eisenhower, Winston Churchill, and the rest of the SHAEF's attempt to prepare for D-Day and Erwin Rommel's attempt to prepare for such an assault. The second half mostly deals with the first month of the invasion from the perspective of both Rommel, Eisenhower, and a composite Army Paratrooper Sergeant named Jesse Adams.

== Reception ==
The book did very well upon its release, reaching the New York Times bestseller list soon after its release.

The Reference And Users Services Association of the American Library Association recognized it as a 2009 Notable Book.
