= Stand by Your Man (film) =

- Genre: Biography
- Based on: Stand by Your Man - An Autobiography by Tammy Wynette and Joan Dew
- Written by: John Gay
- Directed by: Jerry Jameson
- Starring: Annette O'Toole; Tim McIntire; Cooper Huckabee
- Music by: Earle Hagan
- Country of origin: United States
- Original language: English

Production
- Executive producer: Rusty Lemorande
- Producer: Robert Papazian
- Cinematography: Matthew F. Leonetti
- Editor: George Nicholson
- Running time: 120 minutes
- Production companies: Robert Papazian Productions; The Guber-Peters Company

Original release
- Network: CBS
- Release: May 13, 1981

Stand by Your Man is a 1981 American made-for-television biographical film based on the life of Tammy Wynette, the country music superstar, including her tumultuous marriage to fellow star George Jones.

== Cast ==
- Annette O'Toole as Tammy Wynette
- Tim McIntire as George Jones
- James Hampton as Billy Sherrill
- Cooper Huckabee as Euple Byrd
- Monica Parker as Jane
- Robert Carnegie as Glen Daley
- Fredric Cook as Richard

== Reception ==
The Washington Post published a largely negative review of the movie, with critic Richard Harrington stating that "Unfortunately, television will be television, and the results are lackluster and somewhat misleading." However, James Wolcott, in a review of 1985's Sweet Dreams (in which Jessica Lange played Patsy Cline), called O'Toole "superb" as Wynette.
