= William Gamble (general) =

United States Army general

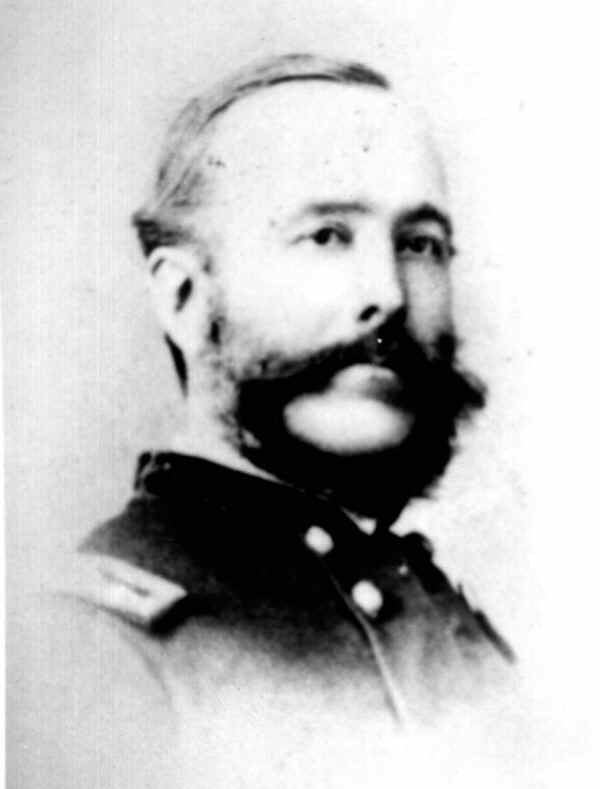
- Born: 1 January 1818; Lisnarick, County Fermanagh, Ireland
- Died: 20 December 1866 (aged 48); Virgin Bay, Nicaragua
- Burial place: Virgin Grove Cemetery, Virgin Bay, Nicaragua
- Military career
- Allegiance: United Kingdom; United States of America
- Branch: British Army; United States Army: Union Army
- Service years: 1838–1843, 1861–1866
- Rank: Brigadier General
- Commands: 8th Illinois Cavalry
- Conflicts: Second Seminole War; American Civil War: Peninsula Campaign; Seven Days Battle; Battle of Malvern Hill (WIA); Battle of Gettysburg; Battle of Fort Stevens

William Gamble (1 January 1818 – 20 December 1866) was an Irish-born civil engineer and a United States Army cavalry officer. He served during the Second Seminole War, and fought for the Union during the American Civil War. He commanded one of two brigades in Brigadier General John Buford's Division of Cavalry, in which he played an important role in defending Union positions during the first day of the Battle of Gettysburg.

== Early life ==
Gamble was born in the townland of Duross, Lisnarick, County Fermanagh, Ireland. He studied civil engineering, worked in the Queen's Surveying Office, and participated in the Ordnance Survey Ireland. He emigrated to the United States in 1838. Since he had experience as a dragoon in the British army, he enlisted as a private in the 1st U.S. Dragoons and rose through the ranks to become sergeant major by 1839. While in the Army he married Sophia Steingrandt, daughter of King's German Legion Feldwebel Georg Steingrandt, on 6 May 1841, and they had 13 (by some accounts 15) children together. After fighting in the Seminole Wars, he was discharged in 1843 and worked as a civil engineer for the Board of Public Works in Chicago and lived in Evanston, Illinois. His house is now used by the Anthropology Department of Northwestern University.

== Civil War ==
At the start of the Civil War, Gamble was appointed lieutenant colonel of the 8th Illinois Cavalry regiment on 18 September 1861. His nomination was urged by his close friend, U.S. Congressman John F. Farnsworth, who raised and commanded the regiment. Gamble's son George also joined the regiment as a first lieutenant. (George survived the war, but was killed in a collapsed hotel during the 1906 San Francisco earthquake).

Gamble's regiment was attached to the Pennsylvania Reserve Division and fought in the Peninsula Campaign during the spring and summer of 1862. On August 5, 1862 - more than a month after the end of the Seven Days Battles - Gamble was badly wounded when he was shot in the chest while leading a cavalry charge against Confederate pickets near Malvern Hill.

Gamble spent the fall of 1862 recovering from his wound, and when Farnsworth was promoted to brigadier general, Gamble was promoted to colonel on 5 December 1862, and was given command of the 8th Illinois Cavalry. His regiment saw no action in the Battle of Fredericksburg.

In early 1863, Gamble was promoted to command of the 1st Brigade of Maj. Gen. Alfred Pleasonton's cavalry division in the Army of the Potomac, but suffering from rheumatism and neuralgia (possibly as a result of his wound the year before or the severity of the winter), he received a medical furlough in March 1863, and was absent for the Battle of Chancellorsville, as well as for the largest cavalry battle of the war in the Battle of Brandy Station. The officer in temporary command of his brigade, Colonel Benjamin Franklin Davis, was killed there, and Gamble returned to the field on 13 June 1863.

During the Gettysburg campaign, Gamble's brigade was assigned to Brig. Gen. John Buford's 1st Division. He reached Gettysburg on 30 June and was riding at the head of the column when they spotted the first elements of the Confederate Army of Northern Virginia and began the Battle of Gettysburg on the morning of 1 July. While his troops were hopelessly outnumbered, they slowed the progress of the Mississippi brigades from Lt. Gen. A.P. Hill's corps for about two hours while Union infantry from Maj. Gen. John F. Reynolds's I Corps (James S. Wadsworth's division) hurried to join the fight. When it came time to retire, Colonel Gamble's troops moved to the infantry's left flank. Gamble, along with the rest of Buford's cavalry, had provided a crucial window of time to get the Union Army into position.

After Gettysburg, the theatre of war shifted back to Virginia. During this time, Gamble briefly joined George Stoneman's staff at the U.S. Cavalry Bureau in Washington, D.C.. Colonel George Henry Chapman replaced him as commander of the brigade, which remained with the main army and fought in the ensuing Bristoe Campaign and Mine Run Campaign.

From December 21, 1863, until the end of the war, Gamble commanded a cavalry division in the XXII Corps of the Department of Washington, where was involved in the defense of the city, particularly at the Battle of Fort Stevens, and thereafter his troopers continuously tangled with the Confederate partisan ranger, John S. Mosby. He commanded the remount station at Camp Stoneman, but the lingering effects of his wounds prevented any further field service. Gamble received a brevet promotion to brigadier general on 12 December 1864, and a full promotion to brigadier general on 25 September 1865. He was mustered out of the volunteer service on 13 March 1866, and reentered the service with the rank of major in the 8th U.S. Cavalry.

== Postbellum life ==
Gamble died of cholera in Virgin Bay, Nicaragua, while en route to command of the Presidio of San Francisco, and is buried in Virgin Bay in the Virgin Grove Cemetery, a burial ground which has been flooded and obliterated by the waters of the Bay.

== In popular media ==
Gamble was portrayed by Buck Taylor in the 1993 film Gettysburg, based on Michael Shaara's novel, The Killer Angels. He appears in the alternate history novel Gettysburg: A Novel of the Civil War, in which he is taken as a prisoner of war.
