= Isaac R. Trimble =

American engineer and Confederate Army general (1802–1888)

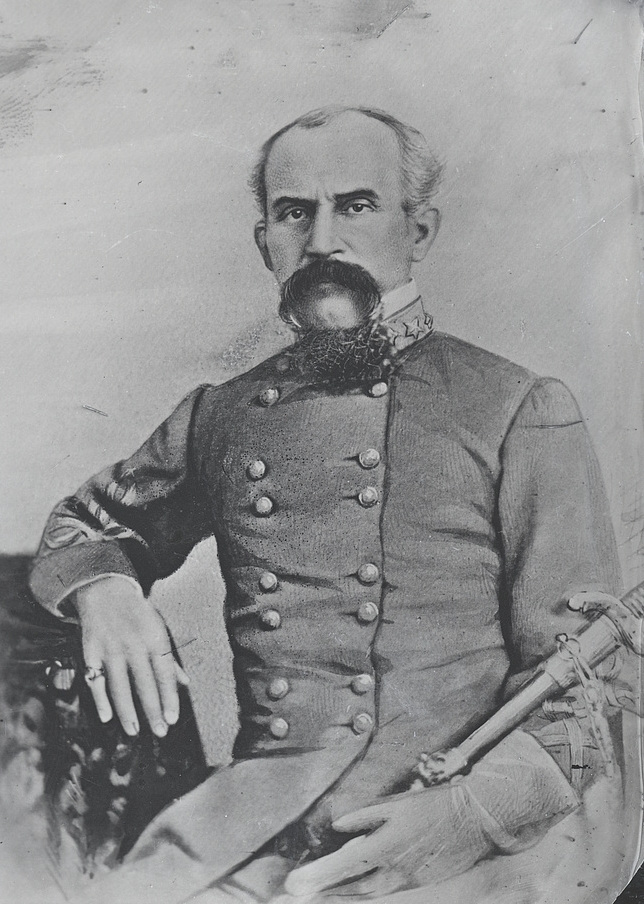
- Gen. Isaac R. Trimble
- Born: May 15, 1802; Frederick County, Virginia
- Died: January 2, 1888 (aged 85); Baltimore, Maryland
- Burial place: Green Mount Cemetery
- Military career
- Allegiance: United States; Confederate States
- Branch: United States Army; Confederate States Army
- Service years: 1822 – 1832 (USA); 1861 – 1865 (CSA)
- Rank: 2nd Lieutenant (USA); Colonel (Maryland Militia); Major General (CSA)
- Units: 3rd U.S. Artillery; 1st U.S. Artillery
- Commands: Trimble's Brigade; Jackson's (Old) Division
- Conflicts: American Civil War; Valley Campaign; Seven Days Battles; Second Battle of Bull Run; Battle of Gettysburg (WIA) (POW)
- Other work: Railroad executive

Isaac Ridgeway Trimble (May 15, 1802 – January 2, 1888) was a United States Army officer, a civil engineer, a prominent railroad construction superintendent and executive, and a Confederate general in the American Civil War. He was born in Virginia, lived in Maryland for much of his adult life, and returned to Virginia in 1861 after Maryland did not secede. Trimble is most famous for his role as a division commander in the assault known as Pickett's Charge at the Battle of Gettysburg. He was wounded severely in the leg during that battle, and was left on the field. He spent most of the remainder of the war as a prisoner, and was finally paroled on April 16, 1865, one week after Robert E. Lee surrendered the Army of Northern Virginia following the Battle of Appomattox Court House.

== Youth, education, building railroads ==
Trimble was born in Frederick County, Virginia, to John and Rachel Ridgeway Trimble, and his family moved to Culpeper County, Virginia shortly thereafter. As a young boy, Trimble's mother and father both died of fever within a short period of time, and he was sent to live with his half-brother in Kentucky. He was nominated by U.S. Representative Henry Clay to attend the United States Military Academy at West Point, New York, from which he graduated in 1822, 17th in a class of 42. Although he excelled academically in engineering, he was commissioned as a brevet second lieutenant of artillery. He served for ten years as a lieutenant in the 3rd and 1st U.S. Artillery regiments, and left the U.S. Army in May 1832, along with five of his West Point classmates, to pursue the emerging business of railroad construction.

Trimble was married twice: first, in 1831 to Maria Cattell Presstman of Charleston, South Carolina, who died in 1855; second, to her sister, Ann Ferguson Presstman. By his first marriage he had two sons, David Churchill Trimble and William Presstman Trimble, who survived him. Soon after leaving the Army, Trimble moved to Maryland at the urging of his wife, and he subsequently considered it his home state.

He helped survey the route of the Baltimore and Ohio Railroad. He was a construction engineer for the Boston and Providence Railroad. He was chief engineer for Pennsylvania Railroad predecessors Baltimore and Susquehanna Railroad; Philadelphia, Wilmington and Baltimore Railroad (serving under famous American Civil War era president Samuel Morse Felton Sr.), where he was responsible for constructing the President Street Station, the line's southern terminal in east downtown waterfront Baltimore in 1849–1850, now the oldest big city train depot left in America. Later then Trimble went to the Philadelphia and Baltimore Central Railroad. From 1859 to 1861, he was superintendent of the Baltimore and Potomac Railroad.

Following the firing on the Federal installation of Fort Sumter in Charleston harbor in South Carolina in early April 1861, he led a contingent of Maryland state militia to burn the railroad bridges around Baltimore to prevent the entry of any more Federal regular army or Northern state militia from passing through the divided riotous city following the bloodshed conflict of the Pratt Street Riots on April 19, 1861, on the orders of the Mayor of Baltimore George William Brown and Governor of Maryland Thomas Hicks.

== Civil War ==
At the start of the Civil War, Trimble participated in efforts to restrict the movement of Union troops to Washington, D.C., by burning bridges north of Baltimore. When he realized that Maryland would not secede from the Union, he returned to Virginia and joined the Provisional Army of the state of Virginia as a colonel of engineers in May 1861. He was appointed a brigadier general in the Confederate States Army on August 9, 1861, and was assigned to construct artillery batteries along the Potomac River and later the defenses of Norfolk, Virginia. He was given command in the Army of the Potomac (the predecessor of the Army of Northern Virginia), of a brigade that consisted of regiments from four different states, effectively merging them into a single fighting unit.

Trimble first saw combat as part of Thomas J. "Stonewall" Jackson's spring 1862 campaign in the Shenandoah Valley. He distinguished himself in the Battle of Cross Keys by fighting off an attack from Union troops under Maj. Gen. John C. Frémont, and then seizing the initiative to counterattack and rout them. During the Seven Days Battles under Jackson outside of Richmond, Virginia, his brigade had few engagements, but they fought hard at Gaines' Mill and he sought to follow up the unsuccessful Confederate assault on Malvern Hill by making a night attack, but his request was refused.

In the Northern Virginia Campaign, Trimble's brigade performed well at the Battle of Cedar Mountain and defeated a Union brigade at Freeman's Ford in mid-August. The brigade marched with Jackson around Maj. Gen. John Pope's main force and Trimble played a major role in the Battle of Manassas Station Operations, seizing a critical supply depot in Pope's rear. Trimble's forced march and action at Manassas Station received praise from Jackson, who said it was "the most brilliant that has come under my observation during the present war." Pope was forced by this maneuver into attacking Jackson's strong defensive positions and suffered a severe defeat in the Second Battle of Bull Run. Trimble was wounded in the leg during the battle on August 29, resulting in an injury so severe that there was speculation that he was hit with an explosive bullet.

Although Trimble avoided the amputation of his wounded leg, his rehabilitation proceeded slowly. For months after, doctors periodically found bone fragments that had to be extracted. By November, he developed camp erysipelas and a probable case of osteomyelitis, and his ambitions for elevation to division command were on hold until he was well enough to return to active duty. He made his desire for promotion abundantly clear to his colleagues, and in one instance before the army moved north to Manassas, he was quoted as saying (probably humorously), "General Jackson, before this war is over, I intend to be a Major General or a corpse!" Jackson wrote a strong letter of recommendation, although he tempered it by including the sentence "I do not regard him as a good disciplinarian." Trimble engaged in a letterwriting campaign from his sick bed to obtain his promotion and to challenge Jackson's claim. He wrote to Adjutant General Samuel Cooper, "If I am to have promotion I want it at once and I particularly request, that my date may be from 26 August, the date of the capture of Manassas." (During this period Trimble also feuded with Maj. Gen. J. E. B. Stuart about their conflicting reports of the battle and who bore primary responsibility for the seizure of the Union supply depot.)

Trimble was eventually promoted to major general on January 17, 1863, and assigned to the command of Jackson's old division, but he continued to be unable to command in the field due to his health. At the Battle of Chancellorsville Brig. Gen. Raleigh E. Colston, as the senior brigadier general, commanded Trimble's division. A recurrence of illness forced him to turn over his division command in the Second Corps to Maj. Gen. Edward "Allegheny" Johnson and he was assigned to light duty as commander of the Valley District in the Shenandoah Valley on May 28, 1863.

By June 1863, Gen. Robert E. Lee's Army of Northern Virginia had crossed the Potomac River in the Gettysburg campaign. Trimble was desperate to get back into action, particularly because he was familiar with the area from his railroad days. He joined Lee's headquarters unsolicited, and wore out his welcome hanging around without formal assignment. Riding north, he caught up with Lt. Gen. Richard S. Ewell on the way to Harrisburg, Pennsylvania, and joined his staff as a supernumerary, or senior officer without a command. He and Ewell quarreled frequently due to this clumsy arrangement and Trimble's lack of tact.

At the Battle of Gettysburg, Ewell's Second Corps reached the battlefield in the early afternoon of the first day, July 1, 1863, smashing into the Union XI Corps and driving it south through the town to Cemetery Hill. Years later, Trimble wrote the following about his encounter with Ewell:

The battle was over and we had won it handsomely. General Ewell moved about uneasily, a good deal excited, and seemed to me to be undecided what to do next. I approached him and said: "Well, General, we have had a grand success; are you not going to follow it up and push our advantage?"

He replied that General Lee had instructed him not to bring on a general engagement without orders, and that he would wait for them.

I said, "That hardly applies to the present state of things, as we have fought a hard battle already, and should secure the advantage gained". He made no rejoinder, but was far from composure. I was deeply impressed with the conviction that it was a critical moment for us and made a remark to that effect.

As no movement seemed immediate, I rode off to our left, north of the town, to reconnoitre, and noticed conspicuously the wooded hill northeast of Gettysburg (Culp's), and a half mile distant, and of an elevation to command the country for miles each way, and overlooking Cemetery Hill above the town. Returning to see General Ewell, who was still under much embarrassment, I said, "General, There," pointing to Culp's Hill, "is an eminence of commanding position, and not now occupied, as it ought to be by us or the enemy soon. I advise you to send a brigade and hold it if we are to remain here." He said: "Are you sure it commands the town?" [I replied,] "Certainly it does, as you can see, and it ought to be held by us at once." General Ewell made some impatient reply, and the conversation dropped.

— Isaac R. Trimble, Southern Historical Society Papers

Observers have reported that the "impatient reply" was, "When I need advice from a junior officer I generally ask for it." They also stated that Trimble threw down his sword in disgust and stormed off. A more colorful version of this account has been immortalized in Michael Shaara's novel, The Killer Angels and in the film Gettysburg, where Trimble directly tells Robert E. Lee his feelings about Ewell not taking the hill.

On July 3, 1863, Trimble was one of the three division commanders in Pickett's Charge. He stepped in to replace Maj. Gen. W. Dorsey Pender, of Lt. Gen. A. P. Hill's corps, who had been mortally wounded the previous day. Trimble was at a great disadvantage because he had never worked with these troops before. His division participated in the left section of the assault, advancing just behind the division led by Brig. Gen. J. Johnston Pettigrew (formerly by Maj. Gen. Henry Heth). Trimble rode his horse, Jinny, and was wounded in the left leg, the same leg hit at Second Bull Run. Despite feeling faint, the 61-year-old general was able to walk back to the Confederate line on Seminary ridge. His leg was amputated by Dr. Hunter McGuire, and Trimble could not be taken along with the retreating Confederates, because of fear of infection that would result from a long ambulance ride back to Virginia, so he was left under the care of a family in Gettysburg on July 6 as the army withdrew. Trimble complained bitterly that if his leg had been amputated at Second Bull Run, the bullet would have missed him on this occasion. He was treated in the Seminary Hospital at Gettysburg until August. Of the charge on the third day of Gettysburg, Trimble said: "If the men I had the honor to command that day could not take that position, all hell couldn't take it."

Gettysburg marked the end of Trimble's active military career. He spent the next year and a half in Federal hands at Johnson's Island and Fort Warren. He was recommended for parole soon after capture, but former U.S. Secretary of War Simon Cameron recommended against it, citing Trimble's expert knowledge of northern railroads. In March 1865, Lt. Gen. Ulysses S. Grant ordered Trimble to be sent to City Point, Virginia, for exchange, but by the time he reached there, Robert E. Lee's army was already retreating in the Appomattox Campaign. Trimble was finally paroled in Lynchburg, Virginia, on April 16, 1865, just after Lee's surrender.

== Postbellum life and heritage ==
After the war, Trimble, equipped with an artificial leg, returned to Baltimore, Maryland, to resume his engineering work. He died in Baltimore and is buried there in Green Mount Cemetery, arguably the most famous Maryland resident who fought for the Confederacy.

In 1997, Baltimore's President Street Station, which Trimble had built in 1849, was restored to serve as the Baltimore Civil War Museum.

== In popular media ==
Isaac Trimble was played by actor W. Morgan Sheppard in the movies Gettysburg and Gods and Generals.

== See also ==
- List of American Civil War generals (Confederate)
