= Joseph Fuqua =

American dramatist

Joseph Bernard Fuqua (born May 3, 1962 in Washington, D.C.) is an American actor, director, instructor and playwright.

== Career ==
Fuqua attained his Actor's Equity card after a two-year internship with the Cincinnati Playhouse in the Park (this after three years at James Madison University). Fuqua received his graduate-level training at the Yale School of Drama and moved back to New York City upon graduation. He joined the Cuccaracha Theater of Soho and spent six years as a company member.

He is perhaps best known for his role as J. E. B. Stuart in the films Gettysburg and Gods and Generals. Fuqua also appears in the films David Searching opposite Camryn Manheim, Heyday, Something Else, and has an uncredited appearance as Bond Trader Boyce, a stockbroker, in Ed's Next Move.

He has guest starred in the television series The X-Files (in the episode "Synchrony"), Star Trek: Deep Space Nine (in the episode "Rocks and Shoals"), Chicago Hope (in the episode "Gun with the Wind"), Becker, NYPD Blue, Beyond Belief: Fact or Fiction, Profiler, G vs E, Brooklyn South and The Wright Verdicts. Joseph also appeared in the pilots for Second Nature, Born and Bred, Elementary and Numb3rs.

Fuqua has acted in over 100 plays over the past 30 years, and is the first permanent company member at the Rubicon Theatre Company in Ventura, California. He has acted in 30 plays at Rubicon over the course of 15 seasons (with his 30th appearance in fall 2014). Fuqua received an L.A. Ovation Award (Rubicon's first Ovation Award) for his performance as George in Arthur Miller's All My Sons, directed by Rubicon Artistic Director James O'Neill.

Throughout his tenure at Rubicon, Fuqua has played a variety of characters of different ages, types, dialects, and backgrounds. For Rubicon's 2006–2007 Balancing Acts season, Joseph played Hamlet, under the direction of Rubicon Artistic Associate Jenny Sullivan, for which he received the 2007 Indy Award for Best Actor and the 2007 Santa Barbara Independent Leading Actor Award.

Along with acting at Rubicon, Fuqua is an instructor for their Adult Acting Classes, Fearless Shakespeare Youth Summer Program, served as Associate Director for their production of Jenny Sullivan's original play, J for J, and served as the play's director for the Los Angeles run starring John Ritter. He has directed the Youth Intern production of This is Our Youth, and for Rubicon's Fearless Shakespeare Youth Summer Program, the Summer Youth productions of A Midsummer Night's Dream, Bard On A Wire, Macbeth, As You Like It, The Life and Death of King John, Romeo and Juliet, and King Lear. In June 2015, Joseph directed Hamlet for that program in a three week rehearsal process with Shakespeare doctor and star of Circuit, Jonathan Wade Drahos.

Fuqua's stage appearances outside of Rubicon include The Mystery of Irma Vep, Private Lives and Six Dance Lessons in Six Weeks (Ensemble Theatre, Santa Barbara), and Fabuloso (Wellfleet Actors Harbor Theatre, Wellfleet, Massachusetts). Other regional theatre credits include the Arena Stage, Portland Stage, Dallas Theater Center, Actors Theatre of Louisville, South Coast Repertory, Santa Fe Stages, New Jersey Shakespeare Festival, Dallas Shakespeare Festival, Manitoba Theatre Centre, Edinburgh Festival, Studio Arena Theater in Buffalo, American Stage Festival, People's Light and Theater, Cincinnati Playhouse and Yale Repertory Theatre.

== Family ==
Fuqua is the son of Brigadier General Stephen O. Fuqua Jr. (1911–1999) and grandson of Major General Stephen O. Fuqua.

== Filmography ==
Year	Title	Role	Notes
1993	Gettysburg	Maj. Gen. J.E.B. Stuart	
1996	Ed's Next Move	Bond Trader Bryce	
1997	David Searching	Walter Pryor	
2003	Gods and Generals	Col. J. E. B. Stuart	(final film role)
