= Robert A. Katz =

American film and television producer and businessman (1943–2022)

- Born: February 7, 1943; Los Angeles, California, U.S.
- Died: June 22, 2022 (aged 79); Los Angeles, California, U.S.
- Occupations: Film and television producer Businessman
- Notable work: Gettysburg; Selena

Robert A. Katz (February 7, 1943 – June 22, 2022) was an American film and television producer and businessman. He received an Academy Award for Best Live Action Short Film nomination at the 60th Academy Awards for Shoeshine. As a producer on Introducing Dorothy Dandridge, he was nominated for the Primetime Emmy Award for Outstanding Television Movie.

Katz was the founder of Medcom, a medical education company. He executive produced workout home video tapes by Jane Fonda and Arnold Schwarzenegger. With Moctesuma Esparza, he was the co-founder of Esparza/Katz Productions, and they produced films including Gettysburg, Selena, and Gods and Generals.

Katz was born and raised in Los Angeles, and served in the United States Marines as a jet fighter pilot after graduating college. He was married three times, to Tishialu Katz, Pamela Katz, and Patricia Brown.

Robert Katz died of lung cancer at the Valley Presbyterian Hospital on June 22, 2022, aged 79.
