= Rise to Rebellion =

2001 book by Jeff Shaara

- First edition
- Author: Jeff Shaara
- Language: English
- Series: American Revolution series
- Genre: Historical novel
- Publisher: Ballantine Books
- Publication date: 2001
- Publication place: United States
- Media type: Print (Hardcover)
- Pages: 512 pp
- ISBN: 978-0-345-42753-3
- OCLC: 45835526
- Dewey Decimal: 813/.54 21
- LC Class: PS3569.H18 R57 2001
- Followed by: The Glorious Cause

Rise to Rebellion is a 2001 historical fiction book by Jeff Shaara that tells the story of the events leading up to the American Revolution. The book spans from the Boston Massacre to the signing of the Declaration of Independence in 1776. The events of the American Revolution are portrayed through the perspectives of multiple characters, including Sentry Hugh White of the British army, John Adams, Benjamin Franklin, Lieutenant-General Thomas Gage, George Washington, Governor Thomas Hutchinson, Captain James Hall, Abigail Adams, Paul Revere, Dr. Joseph Warren, and Major John Pitcairn. Other characters in the book include King George the Third, George Greenville, Samuel Adams, Issac Barre, John Hancock, John Wilkes, William Pitt, Edmund Burke, Sir Charles Townshend, Sir Will Hills, Francis Bernard, Deborah Franklin, William Franklin, Martha Washington, Patrick Henry, Richard Henry Lee, General Jeffrey Amherst, Margaret Kemble Gage, Captain Thomas Preston, Josiah Quincy, Samuel Johnson, Will Strahan, John Quincy Adams, Lord Wedderburn, Thomas Paine, Lord Admiral Richard Howe, John Montagu, Paul Revere, Lieutenant Colonel Francis Smith, Captain John Parker, Walter Laurie, Admiral Graves, Ethan Allen, Benedict Arnold, Henry Clinton, John Burgoyne, Artemas Ward, William Prescott, General Putnam, Major Gridley, Charles Lee, Horatio Gates, William Tryon, Daniel Morgan, Bonvouloir, Richard Montgomery, Hiram Jones, Lady Germain, Henry Knox, Nathaniel Green, and Robert Livingston. The book covers events leading to the American Revolution, starting with what is known as "The Boston Massacre" and ending with the writing and signing of the Declaration of Independence.

Rise to Rebellion is the first of a two-part series on the American Revolution, modeled after Jeff and Michael Shaara's Civil War trilogy. It is followed by The Glorious Cause.

== Reception ==
Rise to Rebellion received generally positive reviews for its vivid portrayal of the historical events of the American Revolution. Booklist praised it as "an exciting evocation of events leading up to the formation of America," and Publishers Weekly appreciated the book's "passion and vigor." Kirkus Reviews, however, called the work "dull" and "disappointing," saying that the characters were "all so burdened by the task of providing the reader with huge dollops of sedulously digested information that Shaara neglects to give them any individual reality."

Rise to Rebellion spent six weeks on the New York Times fiction bestsellers list from July to August 2001. It peaked at No. 9 on the list in the week of July 22, 2001.
