= No Less Than Victory =

2009 novel by Jeff Shaara

No Less Than Victory: A Novel of World War II
- First edition
- Author: Jeff Shaara
- Language: English
- Genre: War; Historical fiction
- Publisher: Ballantine Books
- Publication date: November 3, 2009
- Publication place: United States
- Media type: Print; Audio
- Pages: 480
- ISBN: 978-0-345-49792-5
- Preceded by: The Steel Wave

No Less Than Victory (2009) is the third novel of a trilogy by Jeff Shaara based on certain theaters of World War II. It was published on November 3, 2009.

Opening in mid-December 1944, the novel covers the Battle of the Bulge and the fall of the Third Reich, including the death of Adolf Hitler. It also covers the Allied discoveries of concentration camps in Ohrdruf, Buchenwald, and Dachau. The main characters are George S. Patton, Dwight D. Eisenhower, and two young soldiers named Eddie Benson and Kenny Mitchell. Portions of the narrative are also told from viewpoints on the Nazi side of the war, primarily Albert Speer and Gerd von Rundstedt.
