= Ellis Spear =

Union Army officer in the American Civil War

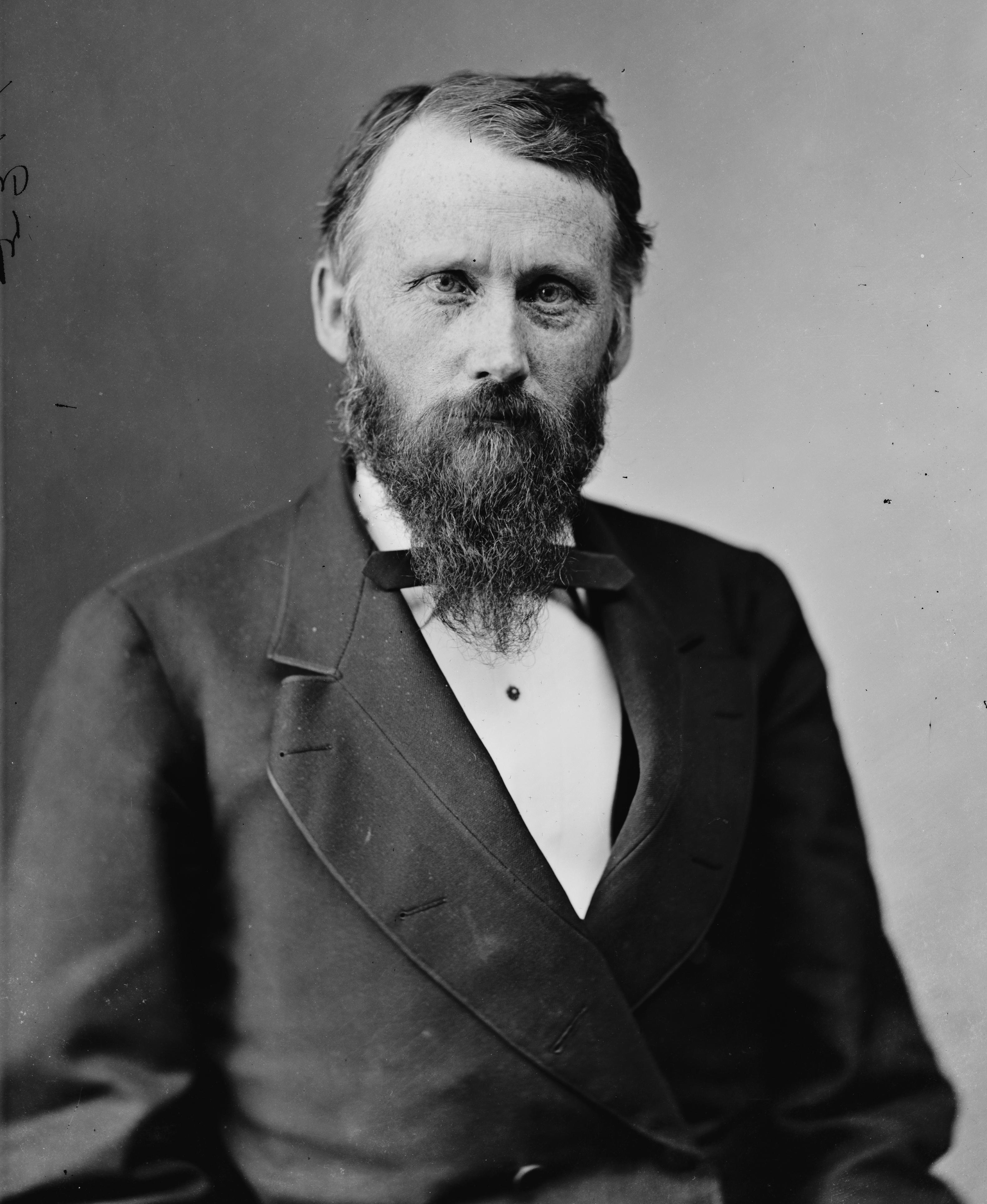
- Bvt. Brig. Gen. Ellis Spear
- Born: October 15, 1834; Warren, Maine, US
- Died: April 3, 1917 (aged 82); St. Petersburg, Florida, US
- Burial place: Arlington National Cemetery
- Military career
- Allegiance: United States; Union
- Branch: United States Army; Union Army
- Service years: 1861–1865
- Rank: Lieutenant Colonel; Brevet Brigadier General
- Unit: 20th Maine Infantry Regiment
- Commands: 20th Maine Infantry Regiment; 2nd Brigade, 4th Division, V Corps
- Conflicts: American Civil War; Battle of Fredericksburg; Battle of Gettysburg; Richmond–Petersburg campaign; Battle of Peebles's Farm; Appomattox Campaign; Battle of Lewis's Farm
- Other work: Patent attorney

Ellis Spear (October 15, 1834 – April 3, 1917) was an officer in the 20th Maine Volunteer Infantry Regiment of the Union Army during the American Civil War. On April 10, 1866, the United States Senate confirmed President Andrew Johnson's February 24 nomination of Spear for appointment to the grade of brevet brigadier general to rank from April 9, 1865. He was United States Commissioner of Patents in 1877–1878.

== Early life ==
Spear was born on October 15, 1834, in Warren, Maine where he grew up on his family's farm and attended a Presbyterian church Sunday School. Spear received his higher education at Bowdoin College, graduating in 1858. Spear taught in local schools for four years while also studying law.

== American Civil War ==
During the second year of the Civil War he became a recruiter and formed Company G of the 20th Maine Volunteer Infantry Regiment. Spear was commissioned as a captain of the regiment, August 29, 1862. At the Battle of Fredericksburg, the 20th Maine took part in the assault at Marye's Heights but were repulsed. Spear recalled the night on the battlefield:

Night came not unwelcome. Exposure and discomfort in a hopeless adventure, defeat and humiliation, the loss we knew not how many of good men, discouragement, and increased distrust in the commanding general, all this was worse than the danger 1,000 times, and covered us with gloom.

He was promoted to major, August 28, 1863. He was appointed brevet lieutenant colonel, to rank from September 30, 1864, for his service at the Battle of Peebles' Farm. Spear was appointed brevet colonel, to rank from May 29, 1865, for his service at the Battle of Lewis's Farm and to the substantive full grade of colonel, to rank from the same date. He took command of 2nd Brigade, 4th Division, V Corps, Army of the Potomac on June 29, 1865. He was mustered out of the volunteers on July 16, 1865.

On February 24, 1866, President Andrew Johnson nominated Spear for appointment to the grade of brevet brigadier general of volunteers, to rank from April 9, 1865, and the United States Senate confirmed the appointment on April 10, 1866.

== Later life ==
After the war, Spear became a patent attorney and eventually became the United States Commissioner of Patents, 1877–1878. He also wrote about the war. His book, The Civil War Recollections of General Ellis Spear was published posthumously in 1998.

Spear wrote that he believed that many members of the 20th Maine, particularly Colonel Joshua Lawrence Chamberlain, exaggerated their roles at the Battle of Gettysburg actions at Little Round Top and at Battle of Fredericksburg. Nevertheless, Spear and Chamberlain remained close friends until Chamberlain's death in 1914.

Spear died in St. Petersburg, Florida on April 3, 1917. He was buried at Arlington National Cemetery. His papers were later published by his grandson, Abbot Spear.

== Films ==
Spear was played by Donal Logue in the 1993 film Gettysburg and by Jonathan Maxwell in Gods and Generals.

== Publications ==
- The Story of the Raising and Organization of a Regiment of Volunteers in 1862 (1903)
- The Hoe Cake of Appomattox (1913)
- The Civil War Recollections of General Ellis Spear (1998)

== See also ==
- List of American Civil War brevet generals (Union)
