= The Killer Angels =

1974 novel by Michael Shaara

- First edition cover
- Author: Michael Shaara
- Language: English
- Genre: Historical novel
- Publisher: McKay
- Publication date: 1974
- Publication place: United States
- Media type: Print (Hardback & Paperback)
- ISBN: 0-679-50466-4
- Preceded by: Gods and Generals
- Followed by: The Last Full Measure

The Killer Angels is a 1974 historical novel by American writer Michael Shaara that was awarded the Pulitzer Prize for Fiction in 1975. The book depicts the three days of the Battle of Gettysburg during the American Civil War, and the days leading up to it: June 29, 1863, as the troops of both the Union and the Confederacy move into battle around the town of Gettysburg, Pennsylvania, and July 1, July 2, and July 3, when the battle was fought. The story is character-driven and told from the perspective of various historical figures from both the Confederacy and the Union. A film adaptation of the novel, titled Gettysburg, was released in 1993.

== Plot ==
=== Title ===
Joshua Lawrence Chamberlain, one of the major characters, remembers his father listening to him recite a speech from Hamlet which includes the line: "What a piece of work is man ... in action how like an angel!" His father had responded, "Well, boy, if he's an angel, he's sure a murderin' angel." The comment inspired young Chamberlain to entitle his schoolboy speech on the subject: "Man, the Killer Angel".

=== Summary ===
In late June 1863, Confederate General Robert E. Lee leads his army into Pennsylvania. By threatening Washington, D.C., he hopes to draw the Union army into battle and inflict a crushing defeat, which will bring an end to the war. Harrison, a spy, tells General James Longstreet, Lee's friend, that the Union army is drawing near. They go to Lee, who is reluctant to trust a spy, but has to, because his usual source of intelligence, Jeb Stuart's cavalry, is out of touch. He sets out to meet the enemy.

At the road junction of Gettysburg, Confederate infantry encounters the Union cavalry of General John Buford. Buford seizes the high ground and holds it against a Confederate attack at dawn on July 1. Troops of General John Reynolds come to support Buford. Reynolds is killed, and the Union troops are pushed back, but at nightfall they entrench on high ground while the Confederates celebrate what appears to them to be another in a long line of victories for General Lee.

Longstreet is filled with foreboding. On July 2, he tries to persuade Lee that the Union position, entrenched on steep hills and behind stone walls, is too strong. He urges Lee to march away and fight on more favorable ground. But Lee orders a flanking attack on the Union position. Colonel Joshua Lawrence Chamberlain of Maine is told by his superiors that he occupies the end of the Union line, and that he must hold at any cost. In a brilliant, costly action, Chamberlain succeeds in repulsing the Confederate attack.

On July 3, Lee, reasoning that his flanking attack was repulsed due to the Union army's focus on them, concludes that "they are weak in the center" and orders a frontal assault on the center of the Union line. Knowing it is doomed, Longstreet argues against it, as his men will be forced to march across an open field under cannon fire to assault the well-entrenched Union center. But Lee is confident, and Longstreet despairs. General George Pickett leads the charge, which is turned back with heavy losses. A shaken Lee orders retreat. Chamberlain is now confident of Union victory.

=== Layout ===
Beginning with the famous section about Longstreet's spy, Henry Thomas Harrison, gathering information about the movements and positions of the Federals, each day is told primarily from the perspectives of commanders of the two armies, including Robert E. Lee and James Longstreet for the Confederacy, and Joshua Lawrence Chamberlain and John Buford for the Union. Most chapters describe the emotion-laden decisions of these officers as they went into battle. Maps depicting the positioning of the troops as they went to battle, as they advanced, add to the sense of authenticity as decisions are made to advance and retreat with the armies. The author also uses the story of Gettysburg, the largest battle in the history of North America, to relate the causes of the Civil War and the motivations that led old friends to face each other on the battlefield.

== Characters ==
- Confederacy
  - Robert Edward Lee (commanding general, Army of Northern Virginia)
  - James Longstreet (lieutenant general)
  - George Pickett (major general)
  - Lewis Addison Armistead (brigadier general)
  - John Bell Hood (major general)
  - Isaac Ridgeway Trimble (major general)
  - James Lawson Kemper (brigadier general)
  - Henry Heth (major general)
  - Jubal Anderson Early (major general)
  - James Ewell Brown Stuart (major general)
  - Richard Stoddart Ewell (lieutenant general)
  - Ambrose Powell Hill (lieutenant general)
  - Richard Brooke Garnett (brigadier general)
  - Moxley Sorrel (lieutenant colonel)
  - T. J. Goree (captain)
  - Walter H. Taylor (major)
  - Arthur Fremantle (lieutenant colonel, British Coldstream Guards)
  - Henry Thomas Harrison (Confederate spy)
- Union
  - Joshua L. Chamberlain (colonel)
  - John Buford (brigadier general)
  - Thomas Chamberlain (lieutenant)
  - Winfield Scott Hancock (major general)
  - William Gamble (colonel)
  - John Fulton Reynolds (major general)
  - George Meade (commanding general, Army of the Potomac)
  - Ellis Spear (captain)
  - Buster Kilrain (private, former sergeant; the only fictional character)

== Publication ==
Publication of The Killer Angels and release of the movie have had two significant influences on modern perceptions of the Civil War. First, the actions of Chamberlain and the 20th Maine Infantry on Little Round Top have achieved enormous public awareness. Visitors touring the Gettysburg Battlefield rank the 20th Maine monument as their most important stop. Second, since Shaara used the memoirs of General James Longstreet as a prime source for his history, the book has renewed the modern re-evaluation of Longstreet's reputation, damaged since the 1870s by the Lost Cause writers, such as Jubal A. Early.

== Literary significance ==
General H. Norman Schwarzkopf described The Killer Angels as "the best and most realistic historical novel about war that I have ever read." The filmmaker Ken Burns has mentioned the influence of the book in developing his interest in the Civil War and his subsequent production of the PBS series on the subject. The book has also been cited by Joss Whedon as the original inspiration for his science fiction/Western hybrid series Firefly.

== Reception ==
Reviews of Killer Angels are generally favorable.

One review noted:

...history must be made palatable. Not inaccurate, not exaggerated, but palatable. And The Killer Angels makes history palatable. The Killer Angels was published more than one hundred years after the Battle of Gettysburg…and in just a few short years sold more than two and a half million copies! Why? Because it describes Civil War combat as no other book ever has: vividly, graphically, and accurately. Because it takes the reader into the minds and hearts of the soldiers, to know their thoughts and feel their emotions, to know their ideas and ideals, their fears and frustrations, their dedication, their courage, their sense of duty. Because it tells the story from both sides and, therefore, appeals to both sides.

== Awards and nominations ==
The Killer Angels received the 1975 Pulitzer Prize for Fiction.

The Killer Angels has been required reading, at various times, at the US Army Officer Candidate School, The Citadel, the Military College of South Carolina, the U.S. Army Command and General Staff College, the U.S. Army War College, the U.S. Military Academy at West Point, the U.S. Army Special Forces Detachment Officer Qualification Course, The Basic School for Marine Officers (TBS) and Saint Joseph's University. It is one of only two novels (the other being Once an Eagle by Anton Myrer) on the U.S. Army's recommended reading list for Officer Professional Development.

== Other media ==
The Killer Angels was adapted into the 1993 movie Gettysburg. Much of the dialogue in the movie comes directly from the book.

The Firefly science fiction television series was developed by Joss Whedon after reading The Killer Angels. Homage to Shaara's novel was paid in the series' final episode, "Objects in Space".

Singer-songwriter Steve Earle included a song on his 1999 bluegrass album, The Mountain, called "Dixieland", sung from the point of view of the character Buster Kilrain.

A stage adaptation by Karen Tarjan was originally produced at Lifeline Theatre in Chicago in 2004, and again in the Fall of 2013. The adaptation was subsequently produced at Anchorage Community Theatre, the Wayside Theatre in Virginia, the Heritage Theatre in Maryland, Mother Road Theatre in New Mexico, and Michigan Shakespeare Festival.

The Killer Angels was the title of the 2013 album by Swedish heavy metal artists Civil War, which included the song "Gettysburg", a song about the Battle of Gettysburg.

A second stage adaptation by Brian Newell, The Killer Angels, Soldiers of Gettysburg, opened May 5, 2017 at the Maverick Theater in Fullerton California.
