= Gods and Generals (novel) =

1996 novel by Jeff Shaara

- First edition
- Author: Jeff Shaara
- Language: English
- Subject: American Civil War
- Genre: Historical novel
- Publisher: Ballantine Books
- Publication date: 1996
- Publication place: United States
- Pages: 512
- ISBN: 0-345-40492-0
- Followed by: The Killer Angels

Gods and Generals is a novel which serves as a prequel to Michael Shaara's 1974 Pulitzer Prize–winning work about the Battle of Gettysburg, The Killer Angels. Written by Jeffrey Shaara after his father Michael's death in 1988, the novel relates events from 1858 through 1863, during the American Civil War, ending just as the two armies march toward Gettysburg. Shaara also wrote The Last Full Measure, published in 2000, which follows the events presented in The Killer Angels.

In 2003, Gods and Generals was made into a film directed by Ronald F. Maxwell and starring Robert Duvall and Jeff Daniels. The film shares most of its cast with Gettysburg, the film adaptation of The Killer Angels.

== Plot ==
Copying his father's approach of focusing on the most important officers of the two armies (General Robert E. Lee, Major General Winfield Scott Hancock, Lt. Gen. Thomas J. "Stonewall" Jackson, and Lieutenant Colonel Joshua Chamberlain), Shaara depicted the emotional drama of soldiers fighting old friends while accurately detailing historical details including troop movements, strategies, and tactical combat situations. General Hancock, for instance, spends much of the novel dreading the day he will have to fire on his friend in the Confederate Army, Lewis "Lo" Armistead. The novel also deals with General Lee's disillusionment with the Confederate bureaucracy and General Jackson's religious fervor.

In addition to covering events leading up to the war, the book includes the First Battle of Bull Run, covered only from the perspective of Robert E. Lee, who was in Richmond at the time and thus not at the battle. Other battles described in the novel are Williamsburg, Second Bull Run, Antietam, Fredericksburg, and Chancellorsville. The film version provides only cursory coverage of immediate pre-war events, focusing primarily on Jackson and the secession of Virginia, and omits Antietam (included in the Director's Cut) along with Williamsburg and Second Bull Run. It spends a considerable amount of time on First Bull Run, which played only a minor role in the book.

== Awards ==
In 1997, it received the W. Y. Boyd Literary Award for Excellence in Military Fiction from the American Library Association.

== Other media ==
Gods and Generals is also the title of the second album recorded by Swedish power metal band Civil War. All three of this band's albums share titles with each book in this trilogy: The Killer Angels, Gods and Generals, The Last Full Measure.
