= The Last Full Measure (novel) =

2000 historical novel by Jeff Shaara

- First edition
- Author: Jeff Shaara
- Language: English
- Subject: American Civil War
- Genre: Historical novel
- Publisher: Ballantine Books
- Publication date: 1998
- Publication place: United States
- Pages: 640
- ISBN: 978-0-345-43481-4
- Preceded by: Gods and Generals

The Last Full Measure (ISBN 0-345-43481-1 (10 ISBN), ISBN 978-0-345-43481-4 (13 ISBN)) is a 1998 novel by American author Jeffrey Shaara, published on May 2, 2000, by Ballantine Books. It is the sequel to The Killer Angels and Gods and Generals. Together, the three novels complete an American Civil War trilogy relating events from 1858 to 1865.

== History ==
The novel, along with the second part of the trilogy, Gods and Generals (1996) were written by Shaara after the death of his father, Michael Shaara, author of the Pulitzer Prize-winning The Killer Angels. Employing the same style as the previous two books in the series, The Last Full Measure is written as a first-person narrative from various officers of the Union and Confederate Armies as they regroup after Gettysburg and move into the final two years of the war. Characters featured include General Robert E. Lee, newly promoted Brigadier General Joshua Chamberlain, and Lieutenant General Ulysses S. Grant.

The novel's title comes from a line in the Gettysburg Address: "It is rather for us to be here dedicated to the great task remaining before us—that from these honored dead we take increased devotion to that cause for which they gave the last full measure of devotion."

Like the first two novels of the trilogy, The Last Full Measure was planned to be made into a feature film by Ted Turner. However, Gods and Generals performed so poorly at the box office that the project was abandoned due to lack of interest and funding.
