= The Rising Tide (Shaara novel) =

2006 novel by Jeff Shaara

- First edition (publ. Ballantine Books)
- Author: Jeff Shaara
- Language: English
- Publisher: Ballantine Books
- Publication date: 2006
- ISBN: 978-0-345-46141-4 (first edition, hardcover)
- Dewey Decimal: 813.54
- LC Class: PS3569.H18 R58

The Rising Tide (2006) is the first novel of a continuing series by Jeff Shaara based on certain theaters of World War II. It was published on November 7, 2006.

It covers the North African Campaign from its position in late May to Rommel's defeat. It also covers Operation Husky in Italy. The main characters are Erwin Rommel, Dwight D. Eisenhower, and two young soldiers named Jack Logan and Sergeant Jesse Adams. Jack Logan was a tank gunner who was eventually taken as a prisoner of war by the Axis but then freed by Allied forces.

The book became a New York Times bestseller and a Wall Street Journal bestseller less than a month after being published, debuting at number eight on both newspapers.
