= Jeff Shaara =

American novelist (born 1952)

Jeffrey Shaara
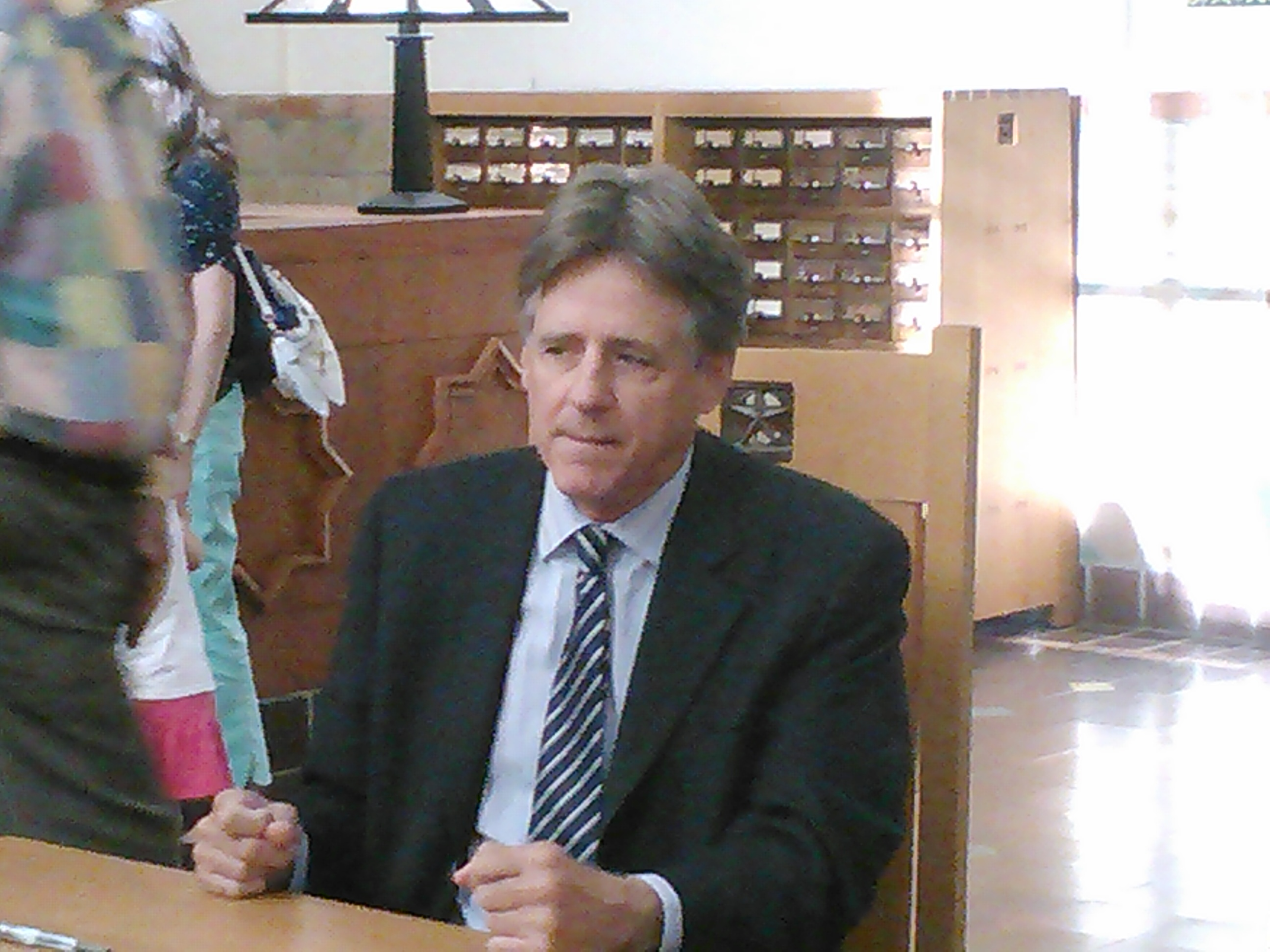
- Shaara at a book signing in 2014
- Born: February 21, 1952 (age 74); New Brunswick, New Jersey, U.S.
- Education: Florida State University
- Occupation: Novelist
- Relatives: Michael Shaara (father)
- Writing career
- Genre: Historical fiction
- Notable works: Gods and Generals, The Last Full Measure
- Website: jeffshaara.com

Jeffrey M. Shaara (born February 21, 1952) is an American novelist and the son of Pulitzer Prize winner Michael Shaara.

== Biography ==
Jeffrey Shaara was born in New Brunswick, New Jersey, and grew up in Tallahassee, Florida. He graduated from Florida State University in 1974 with a degree in Criminology and lives in Gettysburg.

He wrote Gods and Generals and The Last Full Measure, which are the prequel and sequel, respectively, to his father Michael's award-winning novel The Killer Angels. Jeff followed his father's footsteps upon the latter's death, writing historical fiction and documenting the American wars and their most historically relevant characters. In total, Jeff has written fifteen New York Times bestselling novels.

Jeff delivered the commencement speech at the University of Delaware's 2005 undergraduate ceremony. Jeff has deemed this "one of the most important moments in his life."

He completed a trilogy in 2010 about World War II in the European and North African theaters. A fourth World War II novel, titled The Final Storm, covers the end of the war in the Pacific, and was released on May 17, 2011.

== Awards ==
Shaara received the W.Y. Boyd Literary Award for Excellence in Military Fiction from the American Library Association in 2022 for The Eagle's Claw, in 2018 for The Frozen Hours, in 2005 for To The Last Man: A Novel of The First World War, and in 1997 for Gods and Generals. The American Library Association's Reference and Users Services Association recognized The Steel Wave as a 2009 Notable Book.

He has also been awarded the Lincoln Forum's Richard Nelson Current Award of Achievement, New York Civil War Round Table's "Bell I. Wiley Awar, and Florida State University's Artes Award as a Distinguished Alumnus. In 2011, Shaara was inducted into the FSU College of Criminology Hall of Fame and awarded FSU's first annual Distinguished Writer's Award.

== Film adaptations ==
In 2003, Warner Brothers made the major motion picture Gods and Generals, which was based on his book of the same title.

== Works ==
- Jeff Shaara's Civil War Battlefields: Discovering America's Hallowed Ground (2006) ISBN 9780345464880

=== Novels ===
- Gods and Generals (1996)—Civil War (1858–1863) ISBN 9780345409577
- The Last Full Measure (1998)—Civil War (1861–1865) ISBN 9780345404916
- Gone for Soldiers (2000)—US-Mexican War (1847–1848) ISBN 9780345427502
- Rise to Rebellion (2001)—Pre-American Revolutionary War (1770–1776) ISBN 9780345427533
- The Glorious Cause (2002)—American Revolutionary War (1776–1783) ISBN 9780345427564
- To the Last Man (2004)—World War I (1914–1918) ISBN 9780345461346
- The Rising Tide (2006)—World War II (1939–1945), Trilogy Part 1 of 3 ISBN 9780345461414
- The Steel Wave (2008)—World War II (1939–1945), Trilogy Part 2 of 3 ISBN 9780345461421
- No Less Than Victory (2009)—World War II (1939–1945), Trilogy Part 3 of 3 ISBN 9780345497925
- The Final Storm (2011)—World War II (1939–1945), Pacific Theater ISBN 9780345497949
- A Blaze of Glory (2012)—Civil War (1861–1865), Western Theater, Tetralogy Part 1 of 4 ISBN 9780345527356
- A Chain of Thunder (2013)—Civil War (1861–1865), Western Theater, Tetralogy Part 2 of 4 ISBN 9780345527387
- The Smoke at Dawn (2014)—Civil War (1861–1865), Western Theater, Tetralogy Part 3 of 4 ISBN 9780345527417
- The Fateful Lightning (2015)—Civil War (1861–1865), Western Theater, Tetralogy Part 4 of 4 ISBN 9780345549198
- The Frozen Hours (2017)—Korean War (1950–1953) ISBN 9780345549228
- To Wake The Giant (2020)—Pearl Harbor, World War II (1939–1945) ISBN 9780593129623
- The Eagle's Claw (2021) - Battle of Midway, World War II (1939–1945) ISBN 9780525619444
- The Old Lion (2023) - Teddy Roosevelt's life and times, including Amazon exploration ISBN 9781250279941
- The Shadow of War (2024) - Cuban Missile Crisis ISBN 9781250279965
