= The Parent Trap (film series) =

American family comedy film franchise

- Official franchise logo, as released in 1998.
- Based on: Lisa and Lottie by Erich Kästner
- Distributed by: The Walt Disney Company
- Running time: 508 minutes (5 films)
- Country: United States
- Language: English
- Budget: $15,000,000 (1 film)
- Box office: <$106,759,044 (total of 2 films)

The Parent Trap is an American family-comedy film-series, including the original theatrical film, three made-for-television sequel movies and a theatrical legacy sequel/soft-remake. Based on the 1949 novel Lisa and Lottie (published in the United Kingdom and Australia since 2014 as The Parent Trap) by Erich Kästner, the plot centers around identical twin sisters, who were separated at birth and rediscover each other while attending summer camp. The pair trade places upon returning home and devise a plan to bring their family back together. The original 1961 film, which starred Hayley Mills, received positive critical response and was deemed a financial success, bringing in nearly $29.7 million worldwide. Starting in 1986, three television sequels were produced and released as a part of The Magical World of Disney series. The 1998 remake, which starred Lindsay Lohan (in her film debut), also received critical response and was deemed a financial success, bringing in $92.1 million worldwide against a $15 million budget. The franchise is expected to continue, with a streaming exclusive reboot in development to be released on Disney+.

== Origin ==
The 1949 German children's picture book by Erich Kästner first published as Das Doppelte Lottchen (The Double Lottie), was written during WWII as a plot for a movie. In 1942, Kästner was allowed by Nazi officials to develop the project under the working title of "The Great Secret", before the authorities eventually forbade his continued work. After the war, the author redeveloped the story into the successful novel. The plot follows Lisa Palfy and Lottie Horn (Luise Palfy and Lottie Körner in the updated British translation), two identical twins separated in infancy when their parents divorced, with each child raised by one of the parents. The unsuspecting sisters meet at a summer camp where they engineer a plan to switch places when they return home. Though their behavior differs greatly, the parents do not suspect that the daughters had switched places. Upon realization, the family reunites and at the behest of the daughters, the couple gets back together. The book was adapted into various versions, including Walt Disney's adaptation. The novel was discovered by Disney's story editor Bill Dover who recommended the studio purchase the film rights. Production commenced in July 1960 under the working title of "We Belong Together", and went until September of the same year.

== Films ==
Film	U.S. release date	Director	Screenwriter(s)	Story by	Producer(s)
The Parent Trap	June 21, 1961	David Swift	David Swift	David Swift	Walt Disney and George Golitzen
The Parent Trap II	July 26, 1986	Ronald F. Maxwell	Stuart Krieger	Stuart Krieger	Joan Barnett
Parent Trap III	April 9, 1989	Mollie Miller	Jill Donner	Deborah Amelon & Jill Donner	Jill Donner and Henry Colman
Parent Trap: Hawaiian Honeymoon	November 19, 1989	Mollie Miller	John McNamara	John McNamara	Charles Milhaupt and Richard Luke Rothschild
The Parent Trap	June 22, 1998	Nancy Meyers	David Swift and Nancy Meyers & Charles Shyer	David Swift and Nancy Meyers & Charles Shyer	Charles Shyer

=== Original tetralogy ===
==== The Parent Trap (1961) ====
Sharon McKendrick and Susan Evers (Hayley Mills in a dual role) are identical twin sisters who were separated at birth due to their parents' divorce, but are unintentionally reunited years later at summer camp. Together, they devise a plan to bring their parents back together and reconcile their family by switching places after camp with intentions being to sway their parents into falling in love once more, with Sharon heading to California (posing as Susan) to meet her father, Mitch (Brian Keith) and Susan heading to Boston (posing as Sharon) to meet her mother, Maggie (Maureen O'Hara). Their attempts are problematically opposed by their father's gold-digging fiancé, Vicky Robinson (Joanna Barnes). The girls double their efforts in bringing their parents together.

==== The Parent Trap II (1986) ====
25 years after the first film, Sharon now finds herself living the life of a divorced, single mother. While at summer school, her 11-year-old daughter, Nicole a.k.a. "Nikki" (Carrie Kei Heim in her final role before retiring), befriends Mary Grand (Bridgette Andersen), a fellow camper who would later become her step-sister. The pair work together as matchmakers to persuade Sharon into dating Mary's widowed father, Bill (Tom Skerritt). The young friends work to convince their parents that they should be dating. As Sharon plans to move to New York and enroll Nikki into an all-girls school in the fall, Susan is brought into the plan in order to help the single parents realize they love each other.

==== Parent Trap III (1989) ====
Upon returning from their respective summer vacations, triplets Megan, Lisa and Jessie Wyatt (Joy, Leanna and Monica Creel, respectively) discover that their father, Jeffrey (Barry Bostwick), is engaged to a snobbish Cassie McGuire (Patricia Richardson). When Cassie makes the unpopular decision to remodel the family's beach house in California, Susan Evers (Hayley Mills) is hired to redecorate. Susan, who is now herself divorced after helping her niece Nicole a.k.a. "Nikki" (Carrie Kei Heim in her final role before retiring) find love for Sharon again in The Parent Trap II by pairing her with Bill Grand (Tom Skerritt), finds fulfillment in her work. As the triplets collectively decide that Susan is the right woman for their father, they develop a plan to bring the pair together. When their scheme doesn't seem to be working, they turn to Susan's twin sister, Sharon McKendrick-Grand (Mills in a dual role), for assistance. With the wedding quickly approaching, the women set out to prevent Jeffrey from marrying the wrong woman.

==== Parent Trap: Hawaiian Honeymoon (1989) ====
Newlywed couple Jeffrey and Susan Wyatt inherit a family resort in Hawai'i from his late-aunt. Together, the couple, his teenaged triplets and Susan's twin sister, Sharon, move to the island to repair its run-down condition and restore the vacationing location so that they can run an operating business. Despite their attempts, the project proves to be more than its worth, so Jeffrey and Susan decide to sell the property once it is reinstated. As the triplets encounter experiences with the boys they meet at the beach, Jeffrey comes into contact with an old high school rival named Ray. Ray bargains to purchase the property, with a promise of keeping the resort as-is. It soon comes to light that Ray has ulterior motives, which may not only include the land.

=== The Parent Trap (1998) ===
American-raised Hallie Parker and British-raised Annie James (Lindsay Lohan in her film debut) are twin sisters who were separated at birth. By happenstance, the two attend the same summer camp and meet as complete strangers. Born to divorced parents Nick and Elizabeth (Dennis Quaid and Natasha Richardson, respectively), the preteen girls were raised on opposite sides of the Atlantic Ocean. After overcoming their differences and becoming close friends, the pair create a plan to swap places when they go home, giving each of them the chance to spend time with the parent that they have not had an opportunity to build a relationship with. The twins soon decide that they want to get the family back together and come up with ideas for reuniting their parents.

=== Untitled reboot (TBA) ===
In November 2019, it was announced that a reboot is in development. The project will be released via streaming, as a Disney+ exclusive. In June 2026, Lisa Ann Walter revealed on The Howard Stern Wrap-Up Show that the project was a follow-up to the 1998 film she starred in as housekeeper Chessy. She and Lindsay Lohan were in talks to reprise their roles.

== Main cast and characters ==
Character	Film					
Character	The Parent Trap	The Parent Trap II	Parent Trap III	Parent Trap Hawaiian Honeymoon	The Parent Trap	Untitled reboot
Character	1961	1986	1989		1998	TBA
Sharon Grand (née McKendrick)	Hayley Mills	Hayley Mills	Hayley Mills	Hayley Mills		
Susan Wyatt (née Evers)	Hayley Mills	Hayley Mills	Hayley Mills	Hayley Mills		
Margaret "Maggie" McKendrick	Maureen O'Hara					
Mitchel "Mitch" Evers	Brian Keith					
Vicky Robinson/Vicky Blake (née Robinson)	Joanna Barnes				Joanna Barnes	
Charles McKendrick	Charlie Ruggles					
Louise McKendrick	Cathleen Nesbitt					
Verbena	Una Merkel					
Edna Robinson	Linda Watkins					
William "Bill" Grand		Tom Skerritt				
Nicole "Nikki" Ferris		Carrie Kei Heim				
Mary Grand		Bridgette Andersen				
Brian Carey		Alex Harvey				
Florence		Gloria Cromwell				
Jessica Dintruff		Judith Tannen				
Jeffrey Wyaty			Barry Bostwick	Barry Bostwick		
Lisa Wyatt			Leanna Creel	Leanna Creel		
Jessie Wyatt			Monica Lacy	Monica Lacy		
Megan Wyatt			Joy Creel	Joy Creel		
Cassie McGuire			Patricia Richardson			
Nick			Ray Baker			
Ray				John M. Jackson		
Charlotte Brink				Jayne Meadows		
Hallie Parker					Lindsay Lohan	
Annie James					Lindsay Lohan	
Nicholas "Nick" Parker					Dennis Quaid	
Elizabeth "Liz" James					Natasha Richardson	
Charles James					Ronnie Stevens	
Chessy					Lisa Ann Walter	
Martin					Simon Kunz	
Meredith Blake					Elaine Hendrix	
Les Blake					J. Patrick McCormack	

== Additional crew and production details ==
Film	Crew/Detail					
Film	Composer	Cinematographer	Editor(s)	Production companies	Distributing companies	Running time
The Parent Trap (1961)	Paul Smith	Lucien Ballard	Philip W. Anderson	Walt Disney Productions	Buena Vista Distribution Company	128 minutes
The Parent Trap II	Charles Fox	Peter Stein	Corky Ehlers	Walt Disney Television	The Walt Disney Company, Buena Vista Television, The Disney Channel, Disney-ABC Domestic Television, The Landsburg Company	81 minutes
Parent Trap III	Joel McNeely	Isidore Mankofsky	Howard Kunin & Duane Hartzell	Walt Disney Television	Buena Vista Television, Disney-ABC Domestic Television, National Broadcasting Company	85 minutes
Parent Trap: Hawaiian Honeymoon	Joel McNeely	Michel Hugo	Art Stafford & Karen I. Stern	Walt Disney Television	Buena Vista Television, Disney-ABC Domestic Television, National Broadcasting Company	86 minutes
The Parent Trap (1998)	Alan Silvestri	Dean Cundey	Stephen A. Rotter	Walt Disney Pictures	Buena Vista Pictures Distribution	128 minutes
Untitled reboot	TBA	TBA	TBA	Walt Disney Studios Motion Pictures	Disney+, The Walt Disney Company	TBA

== Reception ==
=== Box office and financial performance ===
Film	Box office gross			Box office ranking		Budget	Worldwide total net income	Ref.
Film	North America	Other territories	Worldwide	All time North America	All time worldwide	Budget	Worldwide total net income	Ref.
The Parent Trap (1961)	$25,150,385	$4,500,000	$29,650,385	#3,163	#5,991	Not publicly available	<$29,650,385	
The Parent Trap (1998)	$66,308,518	$25,800,141	$92,108,659	#1,257	#3,340	$15,000,000	$77,108,659	
Totals	$91,458,903	$30,300,141	$121,759,044				<$106,759,044	

=== Critical and public response ===
Film	Rotten Tomatoes	Metacritic	CinemaScore
The Parent Trap (1961)	90% (20 reviews)	73/100 (4 reviews)	—N/a
The Parent Trap II	—N/a(3 reviews)	—N/a	—N/a
Parent Trap III	—N/a(2 reviews)	—N/a	—N/a
Parent Trap: Hawaiian Honeymoon	—N/a	—N/a	—N/a
The Parent Trap (1998)	86% (51 reviews)	64/100 (19 reviews)	A

== In other media ==
=== Streaming event ===
In May 2020, Nancy Meyers (whose 1998 remake of The Parent Trap marked her feature directorial debut) announced a 22-year anniversary reunion event for the cast and crew, which included her now-ex-husband Charles Shyer (who produced the film), Lindsay Lohan, Dennis Quaid, Elaine Hendrix, Lisa Ann Walter and Simon Kunz. In July, together they discussed the making of the movie on Katie Couric's Instagram page as a charity fundraiser for World Central Kitchen, while also honoring the memory of Natasha Richardson, who passed away in 2009.

=== Documentary ===
Family Films Productions produced The Legacy of The Parent Trap series, a documentary film series that gives a retrospective insight into developing The Parent Trap. The film features memories and stories of various cast and crew, about the original 1961 film and its three sequels. Among the interviews, all-new footage featuring Hayley Mills is included. Additional interviewees include Tom Skerritt (who starred in Parent Trap II as Bill Grand), Carrie Kei Heim (who starred alongside Skerritt as Nicole a.k.a. "Nikki" Ferris in Parent Trap II), the Creel triplets (Monica, Leanna and Joy, who starred as Jessie, Lisa and Megan Wyatt, respectively, in Parent Trap III and Parent Trap: Hawaiian Honeymoon), Susan Henning (who served as a body double for Mills in the original 1961 film), Mollie Miller (who directed Parent Trap III and Parent Trap: Hawaiian Honeymoon), Tommy Sands (who, along with Annette Funicello, performed "Let's Get Together" in the original 1961 film) and Joanna Barnes (who starred in both the original 1961 film as Vicky Robinson and 1998 remake as Vicky Blake) and even Lynette Winters and Kay Cole (camp inch scenes). Teresa Andersen, whose daughter, Bridgette, starred in Parent Trap II (and who later passed away of a heroin overdose shortly before the 1998 remake began filming), discusses reflections on experiences that occurred on-set during filming of Parent Trap II with Stu Krieger and Ronald F. Maxwell (who wrote and directed the script for Parent Trap II, respectively). Marilyn McCoo also is featured sharing memories about recording music for Parent Trap II. Charles Fox (who wrote the theme "Let's Keep What We Got"-- the title music in the opening for Parent Trap II-- and the entire music score) is featured on-camera, talking about his experiences in writing the song and music. Disney historian and authors (previous Disney employees) Bill Cotter and Lorraine Santoli are also featured on-camera. The project analyzes and focuses on the life of Erich Kästner who wrote the original German book Das Doppelte Lottchen that the films were based on. Luke Springman, German professor Aaron Pacentine is an executive producer of the film. This is the first full-length film documentary that details coverage on the 1980s Parent Trap films and the first time Miller has spoken out publicly about the original film since then.
