= The Parent Trap =

The Parent Trap may refer to:

== The Parent Trap franchise ==
- The Parent Trap (novel), or Lisa and Lottie, a 1949 novel by Erich Kästner
- The Parent Trap (film series), a series of films based on the novel
  - The Parent Trap (1961 film), starring Hayley Mills
    - "The Parent Trap" (song), the title song from the 1961 film
  - The Parent Trap (1998 film), starring Lindsay Lohan

== Television episodes ==
- The Parent Trap (The Morning Show), an episode of the American television series The Morning Show
- "The Parent Trap" (2point4 Children), 1994
- "The Parent Trap" (Ellen), 1996
- "The Parent Trap" (Static Shock), 2003

== See also ==
- "The Parent Rap", a 2001 episode of The Simpsons
- Sister, Sister (TV series), a sitcom with a similar premise
