= Robert Lloyd Lewis =

American television and film producer

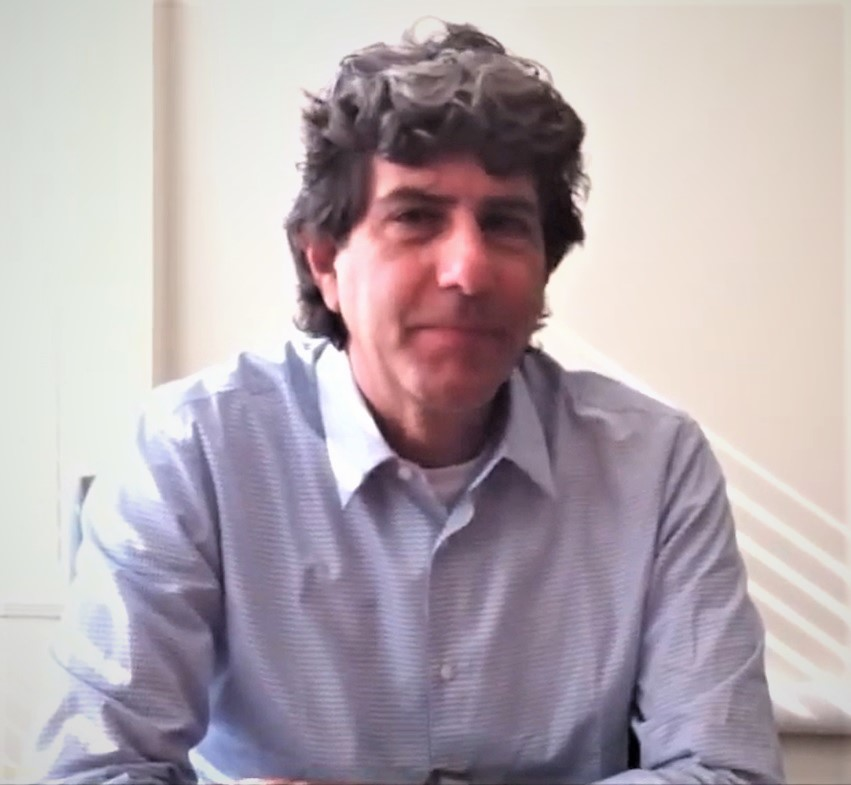
- Lewis interviewed in 2012
- Other name: Robert L.J. Lewis
- Occupations: Film producer Television producer

Robert Lloyd Lewis is an American television and film producer. He has worked as a producer on the Showtime drama series Dexter since 2006 and has received multiple award nominations for his work on the series.

== Career ==
Lewis joined the crew of Dexter as the episodic producer after the pilot in 2006. He took over the role from Dennis Bishop. He remained in this role through for all eight seasons. For his work in the series he received Producers Guild of America PGA Award nominations as 'Television Producer of the Year' in 2008, 2009, 2010, and 2011, as well as being co-nominated for a Primetime Emmy Awards for 'Outstanding Drama Series' in 2008, 2009, 2010, and 2011.

== Filmography ==
His television film A Summer to Remember (1985) received a Young Artist Award nomination for actress Bridgette Andersen, and his television series Related received a Young Artist Award nomination for actress Bridgette Andersen.

=== Television ===
- A Summer to Remember (1985)
- Midas Valley (1985)
- Betrayed by Innocence (1986)
- Swimsuit (1989)
- Spy (1989)
- Parker Lewis Can't Lose (73 episodes, 1990–1993)
- Weird Science (88 episode 1994-1996)
- Players (1997)
- Get Real (1999)
- Action (1 episode, 1999)
- The Big House (2001) Being Brewster
- Trash (2003)
- A.U.S.A. (2003)
- Skin (2003)
- Method & Red (2004)
- Reunion (2005)
- Related 18 episodes, 2005–2006)
- Dexter (96 episodes, 2006–2013) 4 Emmy nominations
- The Brink
- Videosyncrasy
- Goliath
- Kidding
- Lincoln Lawyer
- Dexter: Original Sin (10 episodes)(2024)

=== Film ===
- Superstition (1982)
- Hamburger: The Motion Picture (1986)

== Recognition ==
=== Awards and nominations ===
- 2008, PGA Award nomination as 'Television Producer of the Year' for Dexter
- 2008, Primetime Emmy Award nomination for 'Outstanding Drama Series' for Dexter
- 2009, BAFTA Award nomination for 'Best International Series' for Dexter
- 2009, PGA Award nomination as 'Television Producer of the Year' for Dexter
- 2009, Primetime Emmy Award nomination for 'Outstanding Drama Series' for Dexter
- 2010, PGA Award nomination as 'Television Producer of the Year' for Dexter
- 2010, Primetime Emmy Award nomination for 'Outstanding Drama Series' for Dexter
- 2011, PGA Award nomination as 'Television Producer of the Year' for Dexter
- 2011, Primetime Emmy Award nomination for 'Outstanding Drama Series' for Dexter
