= Parent Trap III =

1989 television film

- Genre: Comedy; Family
- Based on: Characters created by Erich Kästner
- Screenplay by: Jill Donner
- Story by: Deborah Amelon; Jill Donner
- Directed by: Mollie Miller
- Starring: Hayley Mills; Barry Bostwick; Ray Baker; Patricia Richardson
- Music by: Joel McNeely
- Country of origin: United States
- Original language: English

Production
- Producers: Jill Donner; Henry Colman
- Cinematography: Isidore Mankofsky
- Editors: Howard Kunin; Duane Hartzell
- Running time: 85 minutes
- Production company: The Walt Disney Company

Original release
- Network: NBC
- Release: April 9 – April 16, 1989

Parent Trap III is a 1989 American made-for-television comedy film and a sequel to The Parent Trap II (1986) and the third installment in The Parent Trap series. It originally aired in two parts as a presentation of The Magical World of Disney on April 9 and 16, 1989.

Hayley Mills reprises her roles as twins Susan Evers and Sharon Grand. Barry Bostwick and Patricia Richardson portray, respectively, Jeffrey Wyatt, a struggling widowed father with identical triplet teenage daughters, and Cassie McGuire, his snobbish, jealous girlfriend. Leanna, Monica, and Joy Creel portray Lisa, Jessie, and Megan Wyatt.

== Plot ==
Jeffrey Wyatt is the widowed father of identical triplet teenage daughters, Lisa, Jessie, and Megan. As he picks his daughters up from the airport, he neglects to tell them over the summer he has become engaged to Cassie McGuire. Cassie wants to redesign their California beach house with the help of house designer Susan Evers. Jeffrey initially doesn't like Susan's ideas, but comes around to allowing them due to Cassie.

Lisa, who is dating David, has invited a boy she met in Paris named Hawk, a "bad boy" to eat at their house. She doesn't know how to break it to David that she finds Hawk "more unpredictable". She asks Jessie to pretend to be Lisa on a date with David, so Lisa can go on a date with Hawk while their father goes on a date with Cassie, Susan, and Nick (Ray Baker) his best friend. As the adults are getting ready for their double date, Susan compliments Jessie going out with David, Lisa tries to cover up the ruse by saying she is Jessie, only for her father to chuckle even he gets the girls confused on occasion. On their date, Jessie is bewildered to be at a "Welcome Home Lisa" party with all of their friends. She embarrasses herself during a karaoke dance skit called "The Jackson Three" (a parody of the Jackson Five), when she is made to do the Janet Jackson song "What Have You Done for Me Lately".

Hawk is not wanting to settle down and be Lisa's boyfriend. He asks her to run away with him, but she refuses. Later that night, Jeffrey figures out the switch and grounds the girls for three weeks, with David disappointed in Lisa and Jessie. Lisa unleashes her feelings and tells Jeffrey that she doesn't like the jealous, snobbish Cassie, and neither do her sisters. The next morning, Susan speaks with Jessie and Megan, saying her earlier compliment was not an honest mistake, but that she suspected Lisa and Jessie were switching identities, and even shows them a picture of herself with her twin sister, Sharon Grand.

Lisa runs away with Hawk on his motorcycle only to break down at a diner. Jessie and Megan, using David's car, find her. Jeffrey, Susan, and David also do so. Hawk and David fight in the diner, causing the police to be called, and Hawk breaks up with Lisa. David begins to like Jessie better than Lisa. Cassie becomes angry that Susan went with Jeffrey to the diner. The girls begin to befriend and like Susan. They set up a date for her and Jeffrey by not telling Nick and Cassie to come. Jeffrey expresses his admiration for Susan, who refuses because he is engaged. She quits working on the Wyatts' house and continues with Nick's condo and Cassie moves the date to two days away. The girls go to Susan's apartment and meet Sharon Grand, Susan's twin sister. Sharon agrees to help them set up Jeffrey and Susan.

On the wedding day, Sharon and the girls lock Jeffrey and Susan in the garage shed, resulting in Jeffrey missing the wedding. Cassie, devastated, hooks up with Nick and drives away. David and Jessie become a couple. Jeffrey and Susan realize their love for each other after playing the piano and singing to the music box she bought and then gave to him. Sharon and the girls take down the shed wall, revealing Jeffrey and Susan about to kiss.

=== Continuity ===
In The Parent Trap II, Sharon Ferris married Bill Grand (Tom Skerritt), creating a family with their daughters, Nikki Ferris (Carrie Kei Heim) and Mary Grand (Bridgette Andersen). Susan was married to Brian Carey (Alex Harvey). They divorced prior to the events of Parent Trap III, and Susan reverted to using her maiden name, Evers.

== Cast ==
- Hayley Mills as Susan Evers / Sharon Grand
- Barry Bostwick as Jeffrey Wyatt
- Patricia Richardson as Cassie McGuire
- Leanna Creel as Lisa Wyatt
- Monica Creel as Jessie Wyatt
- Joy Creel as Megan Wyatt
- Ray Baker as Nick
- Loretta Devine as Thelma
- Jon Pennell as Hawk
- Chris Gartin as David

== Production ==
Hayley Mills returned in 1986 to the Disney Channel when she filmed The Parent Trap II. She expressed no interest in returning for more sequels. In 1989, Mollie Miller soon began production on the next sequel, Parent Trap III. Mills returned after her Disney series, Good Morning, Miss Bliss had ended.

The film debuted on NBC-TV's The Magical World of Disney on April 9, 1989. Mollie Miller, the film's director, would later direct the last sequel, Parent Trap: Hawaiian Honeymoon.

== Music ==
Songs heard in the film include "I'm Always Chasing Rainbows", sung by Susan and Jeffrey, the 1987 hit single "You Don't Know" by Scarlett and Black, and a cover version of "What Have You Done for Me Lately" by Janet Jackson.
