= Verna: USO Girl =

- DVD cover
- Genre: Biography; Drama; Music; Romance
- Written by: Albert Innaurato
- Directed by: Ronald F. Maxwell
- Starring: Sissy Spacek; William Hurt
- Theme music composer: Jerome Kern, George Gershwin
- Country of origin: United States
- Original language: English

Production
- Producer: Ron Maxwell
- Cinematography: Beda Batka
- Running time: 90 minutes
- Production company: KQED

Original release
- Network: PBS
- Release: January 25, 1978

Verna: USO Girl is a 1978 American made-for-television biographical musical-drama film produced by Thirteen/WNET New York and broadcast nationwide by PBS as part of the Great Performances series on January 25, 1978.

Based on a Paul Gallico story, it focuses on singer-dancer Verna Vane, who fervently believes that a U.S.O. tour overseas will put her on the road to superstardom. Although she's more willing than able, her brave self-confidence wins the hearts of the beleaguered GI audiences. They embrace the dauntless Verna because she, like them, is risking her life for the sake of the American dream.

Verna's fellow troupe members include Eddie, a second-rate vaudevillian, and would-be chanteuse Maureen, who encourages Verna (of whom she observes, "She's invented a new way to sing flat and dance clumsy") to set aside her show business fantasies and accept a proposal of marriage offered by Army engineering captain Walter.

== Production ==
Filmed in military training areas in Hammelburg and Baumholder, Germany by director Ronald F. Maxwell, it stars Sissy Spacek, William Hurt, Howard Da Silva, and Sally Kellerman. Period songs featured in routines created by burlesque comic Joey Faye and choreographed by Donald Saddler include "I'll Get By", "Jeepers, Creepers", and "Since You Went Away". Musical arrangements and Musical Direction by Joseph Turrin.

== Accolades ==
Da Silva won the Emmy Award for Outstanding Performance by a Supporting Actor in a Comedy or Drama Special, and Maxwell's direction and Innuarto's script received nominations.

== Reception ==
Frank Rich of Time wrote, "Verna: U.S.O. Girl is just a small story—too small for a theatrical film but perfect for the tube—engagingly told by talented people. It can stand as a model of what made-for-TV movies could and should be. [...] Verna's troupe is the kind of company that gives the small screen the illusion of depth."
