= Ronald F. Maxwell =

American filmmaker (b. 1949)

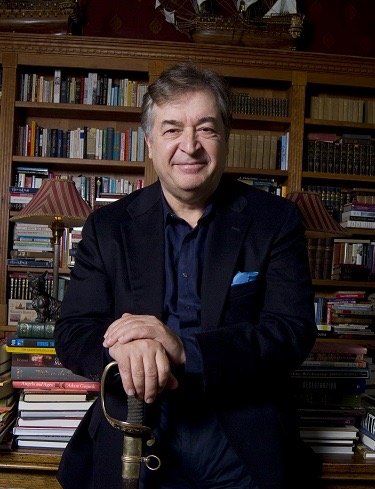
- Born: January 5, 1949 (age 77); Clifton, New Jersey, U.S.
- Education: New York University
- Occupations: Film director, screenwriter, producer
- Years active: 1976–present

Ronald F. Maxwell (born January 5, 1949) is an American film director, screenwriter, and producer. He is best known for his trilogy of films about the American Civil War: Gettysburg (1993), Gods and Generals (2003), and Copperhead (2013).

== Early life and education ==
Maxwell was born in Clifton, New Jersey in 1949. His father was a World War II veteran and his mother was a French woman he met during his service.

He attended Clifton High School, and graduated from the Institute of Film at New York University (NYU)'s Tisch School of the Arts in 1970, where he directed a short film adaptation of Albert Camus' short story "The Guest".

== Career ==
Maxwell worked as a producer for the PBS television program Great Performances. After directing the made-for-television films Sea Marks (1976) and Verna: USO Girl (1978), Maxwell made his feature film debut with the comedy Little Darlings (1980). He followed this with the musical drama The Night the Lights Went Out in Georgia (1981) and Kidco (1984), and the made-for-TV sequel The Parent Trap II (1986).

Maxwell obtained the film rights to Michael Shaara's Pulitzer Prize-winning novel The Killer Angels in 1981, and worked with Shaara on a screenplay adaptation until his death in 1988. After a deal with PolyGram Pictures fell through, Maxwell was able to obtain financing from Ted Turner, and the film was shot in 1992 as Gettysburg. Although initially planned as a television miniseries, Turner decided to release the film theatrically after viewing a rough cut. It was released by New Line Cinema on October 8, 1993, and was a critical success.

In 2003, Maxwell directed Gods and Generals (2003), a prequel to Gettysburg based on a 1996 novel by Michael Shaara's son Jeff.

In 2007, Maxwell optioned the film rights to novelist Speer Morgan's 1979 book Belle Starr, about the legendary female outlaw of the Old West.

In May 2011, Warner Bros. Pictures released director's cuts of Gods and Generals and Gettysburg.

In 2012, Maxwell directed his third Civil War feature, Copperhead, with a screenplay by Bill Kauffman. Filming was completed in New Brunswick, Canada, in June 2012.

== Personal life ==
Maxwell is a member of the Writers Guild of America, Directors Guild of America, and the Academy of Motion Picture Arts and Sciences, and on the Board of Advisors of the Witnessing History Education Foundation..

== Filmography ==
Film

Year	Title	Director	Writer	Producer
1980	Little Darlings	Yes	No	No
1981	The Night the Lights Went Out in Georgia	Yes	No	No
1984	Kidco	Yes	No	No
1993	Gettysburg	Yes	Yes	No
2003	Gods and Generals	Yes	Yes	Yes
2013	Copperhead	Yes	No	Yes

Television

Year	Title	Director	Producer	Notes
1976	Sea Marks	Yes	Yes	TV movie
1977	Hard Times	No	Yes	Miniseries
1978	Verna: USO Girl	Yes	No	TV movie
1986	The Parent Trap II	Yes	No	TV movie

Associate producer

- Great Performances (1974) (2 episodes)
- Year of the Dragon (1975) (TV movie)
- The Mound Builders (1976) (TV movie)
