= Bill Kauffman =

American journalist (born 1959)

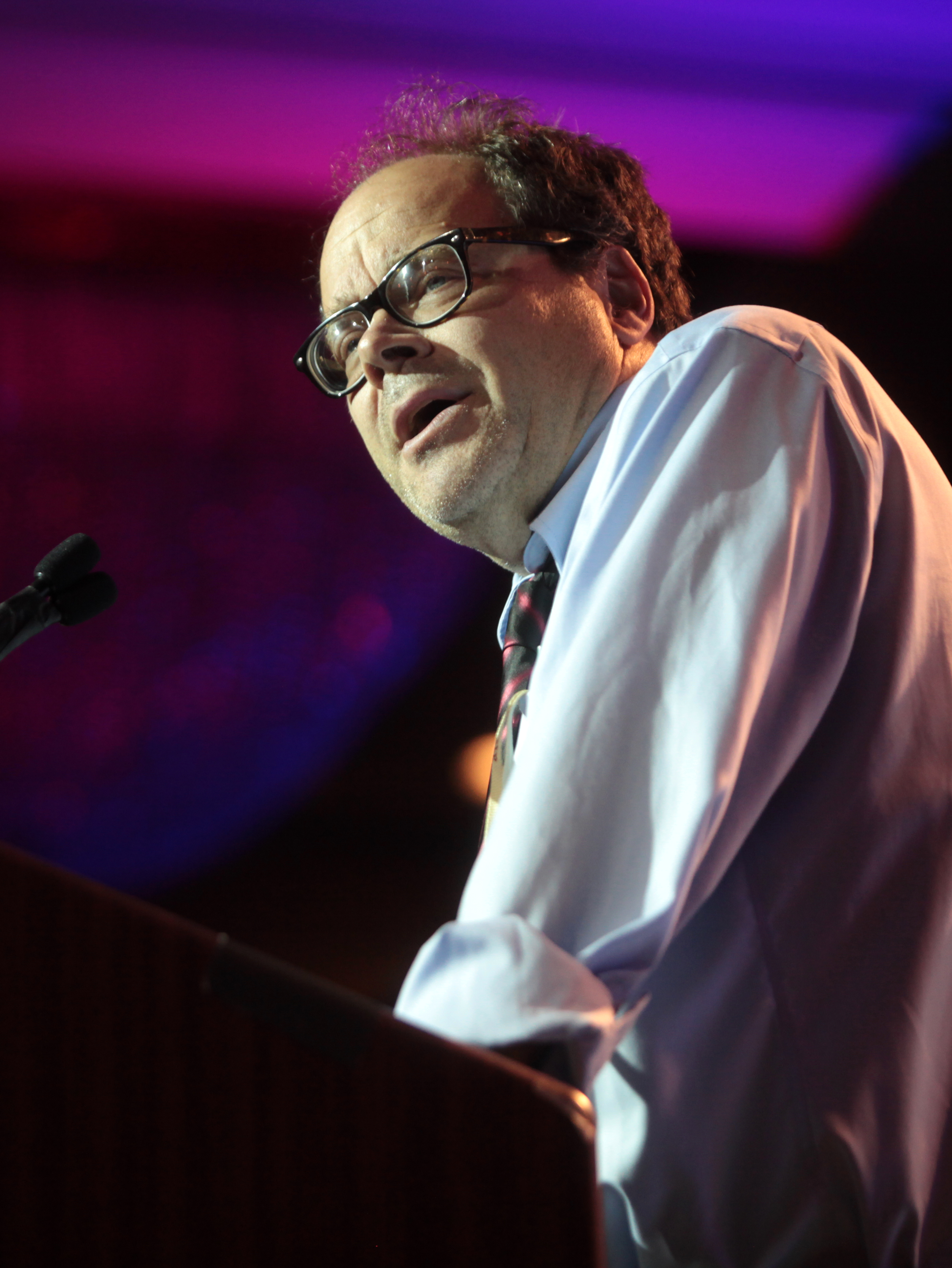
- Kauffman in 2014
- Born: November 15, 1959 (age 66); Batavia, New York, U.S.
- Education: University of Rochester
- Occupation: Author
- Children: 1

Bill Kauffman (born November 15, 1959) is an American political writer. He was born in Batavia, New York, and currently resides in Elba, New York, with his wife and daughter.

A devout Roman Catholic, Kauffman was also an intimate correspondent of the late Gore Vidal, with whom he shares many ideological similarities.

== Education and career ==
After earning a Bachelor of Arts degree from the University of Rochester, he went to work as an aide to New York Senator Daniel Patrick Moynihan (which he would later describe as an "anarchist-making experience") in 1981. After leaving Moynihan's employ, Kauffman worked as Washington, D.C., editor for Reason before quitting and returning to Batavia. He has written frequently for The American Conservative, The American Enterprise, The Wall Street Journal, and CounterPunch. He wrote the screenplay to the independent film Copperhead, which was directed by Ron Maxwell, a friend of Kauffman's. The film came out in June 2013 to mixed reviews.

== Political beliefs ==
Kauffman's politics remain difficult to categorize. He holds strong libertarian leanings with culturally conservative and isolationist inclinations. He is a critic of development, frequently writes approvingly of distributism and agrarianism, and is strongly anti-corporate. Kauffman has described his politics as "a blend of Catholic Worker, Old Right libertarian, Yorker transcendentalist, and delirious localist." He has also described himself as an "Independent. A Jeffersonian. An anarchist. A (cheerful!) enemy of the state, a reactionary Friend of the Library, a peace-loving football fan." Although he remains a registered Democrat, he rarely supports their candidates or their party platform and has frequently voted Green since the collapse of the Reform Party as a significant force in 2000.

Other positions adopted by Kauffman that are considered controversial to both the Left and the Right include his support for the Second Vermont Republic secessionist movement, his admiration for 1972 Democratic presidential nominee George McGovern, his argument that Catholic Worker activist Dorothy Day had much in common with elements of the Right, and his contention that Philip Roth's book The Plot Against America is "the novel that a neoconservative would write, if a neoconservative could write a novel." He made the argument in his book Ain't My America that a true conservative would object to an interventionist foreign policy. An admirer of William Jennings Bryan, Kauffman in 1992 lambasted The New Republic for dubbing Iowa Senator Tom Harkin "Tom William Jennings Harkin", criticizing Harkin for being "awash in PAC money" and as a "faux-populist" in 2004. Kauffman has also expressed admiration for H.R. Gross, Barry Goldwater and Eugene McCarthy.

Kauffman supported the campaigns of Benjamin Spock and Jesse Jackson in 1968, 1984 and 1988. He voted for Reform Party candidate Pat Buchanan in 2000. In 2004 and 2008, he voted for Ralph Nader for President of the United States "because I never got the chance to vote for Gene Debs or Norman Thomas." On September 2, 2008, he addressed the Rally for the Republic in Saint Paul, Minnesota put on by Ron Paul (R-TX). Kauffman supported Bernie Sanders in the New York primaries for the Democratic presidential nomination and Jill Stein in the overall election.

== Writings ==
His books include Every Man a King (1989), a novel about a young senatorial aide who, disgusted with politics, returns to his rural New York hometown to start a new life; Country Towns of New York (1993), a travel book; America First!: Its History, Politics, and Culture (1995), a history of American populist, isolationist, and anti-imperialist thought; With Good Intentions?: Reflections on the Myth of Progress in America (1998), a collection of (often approving) profiles of the opponents of school consolidation, child labor laws, a standing army, women's suffrage, and the Interstate Highway System, as well as the proponents of homesteading as a means of battling the Great Depression; Dispatches from the Muckdog Gazette: A Mostly Affectionate Account of a Small Town’s Fight to Survive (2003), the story of Batavia and its decline; Look Homeward America: In Search of Reactionary Radicals and Front-Porch Anarchists (2006), a meditation on American political, literary, and artistic figures whose values he admires; and Ain't My America: The Long, Noble History of Anti-War Conservatism and Middle American Anti-Imperialism (2008). Forgotten Founder, Drunken Prophet: The Life of Luther Martin, was published in 2008 by the Intercollegiate Studies Institute. It was followed by Bye Bye, Miss American Empire (2010), a study of secessionist movements; by a book reprinting his screenplay for Copperhead; and by the essay collection Poetry Night at the Ballpark (2015). He also edited A Story of America First (2003), a memoir by America First Committee congressional liaison Ruth Sarles Benedict, and The Congressional Journal of Barber B. Conable, Jr. (2021), and he co-edited the 2010 anthology ComeHomeAmerica.us: Historic and Current Opposition to U.S. Wars and How a Coalition of Citizens from the Political Right and Left Can End American Empire.
