= Holiday for Swing =

Studio album by Seth MacFarlane
- Released: September 30, 2014
- Recorded: December 25–31, 2013
- Studio: Abbey Road Studios
- Genres: Christmas; traditional pop; swing; big band
- Length: 42:41
- Label: Republic
- Producer: Joel McNeely

Seth MacFarlane chronology
| Music Is Better Than Words (2011) | Holiday for Swing (2014) | No One Ever Tells You (2015) |

Singles from Holiday for Swing
- 1. "I'll Be Home for Christmas" Released: November 6, 2014; 2. "Baby, It's Cold Outside" Released: December 3, 2014

Holiday for Swing is the second studio album and first Christmas album by American actor and singer Seth MacFarlane, released by Republic Records on September 30, 2014. It is available on CD, vinyl and as a digital download. The album is a collection of Christmas songs and contains collaborations with artists including Norah Jones and Sara Bareilles. It also features Frank Sinatra's bassist Chuck Berghofer as well as a 65-piece orchestra. The album is the follow-up to MacFarlane's Grammy-nominated 2011 debut album Music Is Better Than Words. Like Music Is Better Than Words, Holiday for Swing was produced and conducted by film and television composer Joel McNeely.

== Background and recording ==
On May 15, 2014, it was announced that MacFarlane had completed his first Christmas album and that it would be released in time for the 2014 holiday season.

The album was recorded between Christmas Day and New Year's Eve 2013 in Los Angeles and in studio 2 at Abbey Road Studios in London. In an interview with Billboard, MacFarlane explained why the album was recorded during the holidays nearly one year before its release:

"Generally with a holiday album, you find yourself making the recordings during the summer or any time but Christmas, with this one we actually lucked out. Part of it was because we didn't want to bump up against the production schedule for Ted 2, which is not an ideal time to be recording anything with 12 to 15-hour days shooting a movie. It worked out nicely, and it was just a pure joy to do."

== Release ==
Holiday for Swing was released on September 30, 2014, through Republic Records.

== Critical reception ==
Professional ratings
Review scores
| Source | Rating |
|---|---|
| AllMusic | 3/5 stars |
| Los Angeles Times | 3/4 stars |

Holiday for Swing received mostly positive reviews from music critics upon its release.

Stephen Thomas Erlewine of AllMusic rated the album three stars out of five and states: "Apart from the ever so slight notion that he's singing with a wink borrowed from Burl Ives – a tell that gives away his status as a Gen-Xer weaned on Rankin & Bass holiday productions – MacFarlane plays it straight, even when he's camping it up with Sara Bareilles on "Baby, It's Cold Outside" (Norah Jones is the other guest, singing on "Little Jack Frost Get Lost"), and this sincerity plays out in his favor."

== Track listing ==
Standard edition
| No. | Title | Writer(s) | Original artist | Length |
|---|---|---|---|---|
| 1. | "Let It Snow" | Sammy Cahn; Jule Styne | Vaughn Monroe | 3:04 |
| 2. | "Christmas Dreaming" | Irving Gordon; Lester Lee | Frank Sinatra | 2:49 |
| 3. | "I'll Be Home for Christmas" | Kim Gannon; Walter Kent; Buck Ram | Bing Crosby | 3:55 |
| 4. | "Little Jack Frost Get Lost" (featuring Norah Jones) | Seger Ellis; Al Stillman | Frankie Carle and His Orchestra | 2:36 |
| 5. | "Snow" | Irving Berlin | Crosby; Danny Kaye; Rosemary Clooney; Vera-Ellen | 3:01 |
| 6. | "Marshmallow World" | Carl Sigman; Peter DeRose | Crosby | 2:16 |
| 7. | "What Are You Doing New Year's Eve?" | Frank Loesser | Margaret Whiting | 5:00 |
| 8. | "Baby, It's Cold Outside" (featuring Sara Bareilles) | Loesser | Ricardo Montalbán; Esther Williams | 3:01 |
| 9. | "Mele Kalikimaka" | Robert Alexander Anderson | Crosby and the Andrews Sisters | 2:35 |
| 10. | "Warm in December" | Sidney Keith Russell | Julie London | 3:19 |
| 11. | "Moonlight in Vermont" | John Blackburn; Karl Suessdorf | Whiting | 4:02 |
| 12. | "Everybody's Waiting for the Man with the Bag" | Irving Taylor; Dudley Brooks; Hal Stanley | Kay Starr | 2:46 |
| 13. | "The Christmas Song" | Bob Wells; Mel Tormé | The King Cole Trio | 4:17 |
| Total length: | | | | 42:41 |

== Personnel ==
Credits adapted from AllMusic:

Production

- Joel McNeely – arranger, conductor, liner notes, producer
- Jonathan Allen – engineer
- Rich Breen – Engineer, mixing
- Joy Fehily – executive producer
- Mark Graham – music preparation
- Isobel Griffiths – contracting
- Dave Hage – librarian
- JoAnn Kane – music preparation
- Bob Ludwig – mastering
- Matthew Peak – illustrations

Additional musicians

- Sara Bareilles – featured artist
- Jennifer Barnes – vocals (background)
- Dan Bates – cor anglais, oboe
- Chuck Berghofer – bass
- Mark Berrow – violin
- Richard Berry – French horn
- Ishani Bhoola – violin
- Dave Bishop – B-flat clarinet, flute, flute (alto), sax (tenor)
- Richard Bissill – French horn
- Nigel Black – French horn
- Graeme Blevins – B-flat clarinet, flute, flute (alto), sax (alto), sax (soprano)
- John Bradbury – violin
- Gordon Campbell – trombone (tenor)
- Emil Chakalov – violin
- Reiad Chibah – viola
- Chris Cowie – cor anglais, oboe
- Dave Daniels – celli
- Tim Davis – vocal contractor, vocals (background)
- Caroline Dearnley – celli
- Alison Dods – violin
- Phillip Eastop – French horn
- Dai Emanuel – violin
- Peter Erskine – drums
- Andrew Gathercole – flugelhorn, trumpet
- Richard George – violin
- Tim Gill – celli
- Adam Goldsmith – guitar (acoustic)
- Missi Hale – vocals (background)
- David Hartley – celeste, piano
- Andrew Haveron – leader, violin
- John Heley – celli
- Ian Humphries – violin
- Magnus Johnston – leader, violin
- Karen Jones – flute
- Norah Jones – featured artist
- Skaila Kanga – harp
- Patrick Kiernan – violin
- Liam Kirkman – trombone (tenor)
- Julia Knight – viola
- Teri Eiko Koide – vocals (background)
- Boguslaw Kostecki – violin
- David Loucks – vocals (background)
- Mike Lovatt – flugelhorn, trumpet
- Jim Lynch – flugelhorn, trumpet
- Seth MacFarlane – vocals, liner notes
- Rita Manning – violin
- Danny Marsden – flugelhorn, trumpet
- Eliza Marshall – flute
- Howard McGill – B-flat clarinet, flute, flute (alto), sax (tenor)
- Steve Morris – violin
- Nick Moss – B-flat clarinet, flute, flute (alto), sax (tenor)
- Kate Musker – viola
- Everton Nelson – leader, violin
- Mark Nightingale – trombone (tenor)
- Andy Panayi – B-flat clarinet, flute, flute (alto), sax (alto), sax (soprano)
- John Parricelli – guitar (acoustic)
- Alan Pasqua – piano
- Camilla Pay – harp
- David Pyatt – French horn
- Frank Ricotti – percussion
- Tom Rizzo – guitar (acoustic)
- Martin Robertson – B-flat clarinet, clarinet (bass), flute, sax (baritone)
- Jackie Shave – leader, violin
- Emlyn Singleton – violin
- Colin Skinner – B-flat clarinet, clarinet (bass), flute, sax (baritone)
- Sonia Slany – violin
- Jamie Talbot – B-flat clarinet, flute, flute (alto), sax (alto), sax (soprano)
- Cathy Thompson – violin
- Phil Todd – B-flat clarinet, flute, flute (alto), sax (alto), sax (soprano)
- Chris Tombling – violin
- Bozidar Vukotic – celli
- Vicci Wardman – viola
- Richard Watkins – French horn
- Bruce White – viola
- Pat White – flugelhorn, trumpet
- Rolf Wilson – violin
- Andy Wood – trombone (bass)

== Chart performance ==
| Chart (2014) | Peak position |
|---|---|
| US Billboard 200 | 51 |
| US Top Jazz Albums (Billboard) | 3 |
| US Heatseekers Albums (Billboard) | 1 |
| US Top Holiday Albums (Billboard) | 8 |

== Release history ==
| Region | Date | Format(s) | Label |
|---|---|---|---|
| United States | September 30, 2014 | CD; Digital download; Vinyl | Republic |
