= Copperhead (2013 film) =

2013 film directed by Ron Maxwell

- Theatrical release poster
- Directed by: Ron Maxwell
- Screenplay by: Bill Kauffman
- Story by: Harold Frederic
- Produced by: Bryan Cassels
- Starring: Billy Campbell; Angus Macfadyen; Augustus Prew; Lucy Boynton; Casey Thomas Brown; Peter Fonda
- Cinematography: Kees Van Oostrum
- Edited by: Marc Pollon
- Music by: Laurent Eyquem
- Production companies: Swordspoint Productions; Brainstorm Media
- Distributed by: Film Collective
- Release date: June 28, 2013
- Running time: 118 minutes
- Country: United States
- Language: English
- Budget: $12 million
- Box office: $171,740

Copperhead is a 2013 American historical war drama film produced and directed by Ron Maxwell and starring Billy Campbell, Angus Macfadyen, Augustus Prew, Lucy Boynton and Peter Fonda. The screenplay, written by Bill Kauffman, is based on the 19th-century novel The Copperhead by Harold Frederic. Set in Upstate New York, the film is about a family of antiwar Union Democrats, commonly known as "copperheads".

Copperheads is Maxwell's third film about the American Civil War, following Gettysburg (1993) and Gods and Generals (2003). It was released in the United States on June 28, 2013, and was a critical and commercial failure.

== Plot ==
Set in 1862 in a rural upstate New York community referred to as "The Corners", Abner Beech is a dairy farmer and an antiwar Democrat, sharing quarters with the Irish Hurley family. While his neighbors take up the Union cause in the ongoing American Civil War, Beech believes that coercion in resisting the secession of the southern states is unconstitutional and not worth risking the lives of so many young men, gradually becomes more and more harassed for his views, derisively called a "Copperhead." Abner's son, Thomas Jefferson "Jeff" Beech enlists in the Union Army to impress a girl he likes, Esther Hagadorn, the daughter of radical abolitionist Jee Hagadorn, who works to turn the community against Abner.

Esther visits the Beeches one evening to warn them over dinner that a violent mob, including her father, is coming to retaliate against Beech following the election of anti-war Democrats such as Horatio Seymour to the Governorship and downballot county offices. As the mob starts shooting at and setting fire to the farmhouse, Abner tells Esther to escape through the backdoor, but the house is shrouded in smoke and the door is jammed, prompting Esther to hide in the wine cellar. Later that evening, the Beech family is taking shelter in their barn and are visited by Jee who is looking for his daughter. Finding Esther's locket in the smoldering rubble of the farmhouse, Esther is believed dead in the fire, causing a distraught Jee to commit suicide. Esther is soon found passed out, but recovers in time for Jeff to return home from the war (Esther's brother, Ni, went south to check Jeff's whereabouts and rescue him from a prison camp).

== Cast ==
- Billy Campbell as Abner Beech
- Angus Macfadyen as Jee Hagadorn
- Augustus Prew as Ni Hagadorn
- Lucy Boynton as Esther Hagadorn
- Peter Fonda as Avery
- Key Williams as Neels Robert
- Casey Thomas Brown as Thomas Jefferson "Jeff" Beech
- François Arnaud as Warner Pitts
- Josh Cruddas as Jimmy Hurley
- Genevieve Steele as M'Rye Beech
- Ryan Doucette as Byron Truax

== Production ==
The film had the working title Copperhead: The War at Home. Jason Patric was initially attached to star, but was replaced by Billy Campbell after production commenced due to what director Maxwell called "creative differences".

Filming took place mostly at Kings Landing Historical Settlement in New Brunswick, Canada.

== Reception ==
=== Box office ===
Copperhead opened in limited theatrical release June 28, 2013, playing in 59 theaters and was simultaneously released in video-on-demand platforms including Amazon Video. The film ultimately grossed $171,740.

=== Critical response ===
On review aggregator Rotten Tomatoes holds an approval rating of 21% based on 19 reviews, and an average rating of 4.74/10. On Metacritic, which uses a weighted average, the film has a score of 34 out of 100, based on 12 critics, indicating "generally unfavorable" reviews.

Stephanie Merry of The Washington Post gave the film two out of four stars, remarking, "The story offers uncommon insights on the endlessly parsed period in history, but its execution sometimes falls short. Both the production quality and the persistent, sentimental soundtrack create a made-for-TV feel." Mark Olsen of the Los Angeles Times shared similar criticism, opining, "Where Tony Kushner's screenplay for Steven Spielberg's Lincoln found energetic drama in political wrangling and historical events, Copperhead crams far too much of its action into its last 30 minutes after a rambling, drawn-out set up. Painfully lugubrious, any sting Copperhead might contain for its contrarian's view of history is undone by its wayward sense of storytelling."

Christine N. Ziemba of Paste magazine wrote Copperhead a fairly mixed review, stating "Despite good performances throughout the film, the pacing of Copperhead is slow, with many long takes and establishing shots that seem a bit over-indulgent, as if to remind viewers that they're watching an 'important, yet little-known, historical drama.'" Despite ultimately giving the movie a mixed review, John DeFore of The Hollywood Reporter optimistically stated, "Theatrical prospects are meager..., but history buffs may appreciate its earnest look at an underexplored subject on small screens."

== Relation to director's previous works ==
Copperhead is Maxwell's third Civil War film, though the director does not consider it to be part of the trilogy he has planned along with Gettysburg (1993) and Gods and Generals (2003), as he expected to conclude the series with a final film centered on the end of the war.
