= A Summer to Remember =

- 1993 VHS cover
- Genre: Comedy; Drama
- Written by: Robert Michael Lewis; Scott Swanton
- Directed by: Robert Michael Lewis
- Starring: James Farentino; Tess Harper
- Music by: Charles Fox
- Country of origin: United States
- Original language: English

Production
- Executive producer: Max A. Keller
- Producers: Edward Gold; Micheline H. Keller; Robert Lloyd Lewis; Charles Hairston
- Cinematography: Stephen W. Gray
- Editor: Les Green
- Running time: 93 min.
- Production company: Inter Planetary Pictures

Original release
- Network: CBS
- Release: March 27, 1985

A Summer to Remember is a 1985 American family television drama film written and directed by Robert Michael Lewis and starring James Farentino, Tess Harper and Louise Fletcher.

== Plot ==
Two young children find an orangutan living in their treehouse. Toby who uses sign language finds out that the Orangutan can sign as well, and his little sister interprets. They get up one morning and take the Orangutan out and go on an adventure. The parents take the kids to see a circus and there is a sick gorilla there called "Mad Max" who is really poorly. The children come home and find that Kacey the Orangutan has gone. They try to find her, but she ends getting captured and they put Kacey in the same cage as Max until they can find her owner. The children steal the keys and let them both go. Then there is an Orangutan and a gorilla on the loose followed by the owners and police with guns and veterinarians. Max is shot with sleeping drugs and gets the help that he needed, and Kacey goes back to her owners and Toby regains his speech.

== Cast ==
- James Farentino as Tom Wyler
- Tess Harper as Jeannie Wyler
- Bridgette Andersen as Jill
- Sean Gerlis as Toby
- Burt Young as Fidel Fargo
- Louise Fletcher as Dr. Dolly McKeever
- Dennis Haysbert as Sheriff Pierce
- Molly Cheek as Trish
- Dennis Fimple as Smitty
- Corey Brunish as Meadows
