= Music Is Better Than Words =

Studio album by Seth MacFarlane
- Released: September 27, 2011
- Recorded: December 10–13, 2010
- Studios: Capitol (Hollywood, California); Avatar (New York, New York)
- Genres: Swing; big band; vocal jazz; traditional pop
- Length: 48:29
- Label: Universal Republic
- Producer: Joel McNeely

Seth MacFarlane chronology
| Music Is Better Than Words (2011) | Holiday for Swing (2014) |

Singles from Music Is Better Than Words
- 1. "The Night They Invented Champagne" Released: September 6, 2011; 2. "Nine O'Clock" Released: September 27, 2011

Music Is Better Than Words is the debut studio album by American actor and singer Seth MacFarlane. The album contains songs from the Great American Songbook, and features standards by Rodgers and Hammerstein and Lerner and Loewe, among other 1940s and ’50s-era show tunes. The album features duets with Norah Jones and Sara Bareilles. The album was produced and conducted by film and television composer Joel McNeely, who is also one of the composers of American Dad!, an animated TV series co-created by MacFarlane.

On November 30, 2011, the album received two nominations at the 54th Grammy Awards for Best Traditional Pop Vocal Album and Best Engineered Album, Non-Classical.

== Background ==
In 2010, MacFarlane signed a record deal with Universal Republic Records. On The Tonight Show with Jay Leno, he announced he was working with Universal Republic Records in putting together a big band album after signing a record deal. MacFarlane explained, "It's rare in this day and age to have the opportunity to create an album that celebrates the classic, sophisticated sound of rich, lush swing orchestrations. It will be an absolute joy to sing this music, and I look forward to working with the entire team at Universal Republic on what we intend to make an exceptional project." He also performed the song "You're the Cream in My Coffee" during this appearance.

When Universal Republic Records asked MacFarlane what kind of album he wanted to do, he said "a classic Sinatra-style album". The production process for the album reconstructs the techniques used in the 40s and 50s by utilizing a live orchestra and a big band playing together in the same room where MacFarlane sings live. The album was recorded at the Capitol Records Building in the same room in which Sinatra had worked. Moreover, MacFarlane recorded the vocals for Music Is Better Than Words with the microphone that Sinatra used on many of his classic albums. In an interview with Joseph Llanes from AOL he said, "That mic is over 60 years old and you can see it. But it has a really nice, dark sound to it. It really plays a significant part on how this stuff sounds. You don't want it to sound too crisp. We did a lot in the recording of this album to make sure it was not too perfect. We recorded to analog tape as opposed to recording digitally because we wanted a little bit of a hiss." In addition, MacFarlane and McNeely wrote additional lyrics and melodies to "She's Wonderful Too". The song was written by McNeely for an episode of the television series The Young Indiana Jones Chronicles. George Lucas gave them his blessing, to make the song more new and complete.

== Promotion ==
MacFarlane appeared as a guest on Conan on February 10, and performed "The Sadder But Wiser Girl". He also appeared on The Tonight Show with Jay Leno on September 27, followed by Jimmy Kimmel Live! on September 28.

=== Swingin' in Concert ===
In February 2011, it was announced that MacFarlane would be performing a one-night-only concert titled Seth MacFarlane: Swingin' in Concert at the Club Nokia in Los Angeles on March 26. The show featured a 39-piece orchestra and also a duet with Sara Bareilles. The special aired on September 24 on Epix.

The special earned an Emmy Award nomination in the category Outstanding Music Direction.

== Critical reception ==
Professional ratings
Review scores
| Source | Rating |
|---|---|
| AllMusic | 2.5/5 stars |
| Slant Magazine | 3/5 stars |
| Spin | 4/10 |

The album received mixed reviews. Slant Magazine described it as "a novelty record" and wrote, "Collaborating with Joel McNeely on arrangements, MacFarlane casts Music Is Better Than Words as a tribute to the big-band swing and sterling pop of the Rat Pack, but he wisely avoids choosing songs that were recorded by his musical idols. There's a timelessness to the melodies of James Van Heusen's "It's Anybody's Spring" and Rodgers and Hammerstein's "Something Good," and McNeely's tasteful horn and string arrangements are flawless recreations of the sounds of Sinatra's mid-century records." The review continued with "...the album has nothing to offer beyond MacFarlane's attempts to preserve and honor this particular style of music" and concluded, "Music Is Better Than Words doesn't have any greater purpose than to allow MacFarlane the opportunity to indulge in his desire to record an album of standards."

Spin expressed a dissenting opinion, calling the album "alternately audacious and befuddling... devotees will search in vain for the necrophilia punch lines, while Sinatra fans will search in vain for a plausible explanation." AllMusic wrote: "MacFarlane and McNeely don't attempt to ape the pizzazz of Frank [Sinatra]'s Reprise years, nor do they spend much time with May's snazzy snap, they stick with Riddle and Jenkins, keeping things sentimental and lush even when the words crackle with wit. Then again, MacFarlane is so concerned about inhabiting Sinatra's silken suits he doesn't really care about the meaning of the songs; all that matters is sounding like Ol' Blue Eyes, which MacFarlane does about as well as any number of hotel lounge singers this world over."

== Track listing ==
Standard edition
| No. | Title | Writer(s) | Length |
|---|---|---|---|
| 1. | "It's Anybody's Spring" | Jimmy Van Heusen; Johnny Burke | 2:56 |
| 2. | "Music Is Better Than Words" | Betty Comden; Adolph Green; André Previn | 3:20 |
| 3. | "Anytime, Anywhere" | Lenny Adelson; Imogen Carpenter | 4:00 |
| 4. | "The Night They Invented Champagne" | Alan Jay Lerner; Frederick Loewe | 2:36 |
| 5. | "Two Sleepy People" (featuring Norah Jones) | Hoagy Carmichael; Frank Loesser | 4:26 |
| 6. | "You're the Cream in My Coffee" | Ray Henderson; Buddy DeSylva; Lew Brown | 2:23 |
| 7. | "Something Good" | Richard Rodgers | 4:16 |
| 8. | "Nine O'Clock" | Bob Merrill | 3:12 |
| 9. | "Love Won't Let You Get Away" (featuring Sara Bareilles) | Van Heusen; Sammy Cahn | 3:52 |
| 10. | "It's Easy to Remember" | Rodgers; Lorenz Hart | 5:05 |
| 11. | "The Sadder But Wiser Girl" | Meredith Willson | 2:55 |
| 12. | "Laura" | David Raksin; Johnny Mercer | 5:28 |
| 13. | "You and I" | Willson | 3:41 |
| 14. | "She's Wonderful Too" | Joel McNeely; Jonathan Hales; Seth MacFarlane | 2:59 |
| Total length: | | | 48:29 |

== Personnel ==
Credits adapted from AllMusic:

Production

- Joel McNeely — arranger, conductor, liner notes, producer
- Rich Breen – Engineer, mixing
- Dave Hage – librarian
- Frank Filipetti – engineer
- Mike Ging – engineer
- Gary Lindsay – arranger, consultant, score preparation
- Bob Ludwig — mastering
- Charlie Paakkari – assistant engineer
- Matthew Peak – illustrations
- Peter Rotter – contractor
- Paul Smith – assistant engineer
- David Sporny – consultant
- Aaron Walk – assistant engineer
- Autumn de Wilde – photography
- Booker White – music preparation

Musicians

- Seth MacFarlane – vocals
- Richard Altenbach – violin
- Sara Bareilles – featured artist
- Chuck Berghofer – bass
- Wayne Bergeron – trumpet
- Alan Broadbent – piano
- Robert Brophy – viola
- Roberto Cani – violin
- Pete Christlieb – sax (tenor)
- Wade Culbreath – percussion
- Brian Dembow – viola
- Bruce Dukov – violin
- Stephen Erdody – celli
- Peter Erskine – drums
- Alan Estes – percussion
- Dave Everson – horn
- Chuck Findley – trumpet
- Marlow Fisher – viola
- Lorenz Gamma – violin
- Julie Gigante – violin
- Endre Granat – violin
- Adolph Green – composer
- Henry Gronnier – violin
- Clayton Haslop – violin
- Tamara Hatwan – violin
- Steven Holtman – trombone
- Dan Higgins – sax (alto)
- Steven Holtman – trombone
- Greg Huckins – sax (baritone)
- Alex Iles – trombone
- Norah Jones – featured artist
- Daniel Kelley – horn
- Larry Koonse – guitar (acoustic)
- Armen Ksajikian – celli
- Steve Kujala – flute
- Phillip Levy – violin
- Bill Listen – sax (tenor)
- Warren Luening – trumpet
- Andrew Martin – trombone
- Victoria Miskolczy – viola
- Kenneth Munday – bassoon
- Helen Nightengale – violin
- Cheryl Norman – violin
- Michael Nowak – viola
- Sid Page – violin
- Joel Pargman – violin
- Alyssa Park – violin
- William Frank "Bill" Reichenbach Jr. – trombone
- Mark Robertson – violin
- Julie Rogers – violin
- Geri Rotella – flute
- Brian Scanlon – sax (alto)
- Andrew Shulman – celli
- David H. Speltz – celli
- Bob Summers – trumpet
- Tereza Stanislav – violin
- James Thatcher – horn
- Jo Ann Turovsky – harp
- Josefina Vergara – violin
- Dave Walther – viola
- John Walz – celli
- David Weiss – oboe
- Roger Wilkie – violin

== Chart positions ==
| Chart (2011) | Peak position |
|---|---|
| US Billboard 200 | 111 |
| US Top Jazz Albums (Billboard) | 2 |
| US Top Album Sales (Billboard) | 111 |
| US Top Traditional Jazz Albums (Billboard) | 2 |
| US Heatseekers Albums (Billboard) | 2 |

== Release history ==
| Region | Date | Format(s) | Label |
|---|---|---|---|
| United States | September 27, 2011 | CD; Digital download; Vinyl | Universal Republic |
