= Gun Shy (TV series) =

- Genre: Comedy Western
- Directed by: Peter Baldwin; Marc Daniels; Alan Myerson
- Starring: Barry Van Dyke; Tim Thomerson; Keith Mitchell; Bridgette Andersen; Henry Jones; Geoffrey Lewis
- Music by: Dennis McCarthy
- Country of origin: United States
- Original language: English
- No. of seasons: 1
- No. of episodes: 6 (list of episodes)

Production
- Executive producer: William Robert Yates
- Producers: Eric Cohen; Tom Leetch
- Camera setup: Single camera
- Running time: 30 minutes
- Production company: Walt Disney Productions

Original release
- Network: CBS
- Release: March 15 – April 19, 1983

Gun Shy is an American sitcom that was shown on CBS from March 15 to April 19, 1983. The series, produced by Walt Disney Productions, was based on its popular comedy Western films The Apple Dumpling Gang (1975) and The Apple Dumpling Gang Rides Again (1979).

== Premise ==
Set in 1869, a gambler (Barry Van Dyke) wins two children (Keith Mitchell and later Adam Rich, and Bridgette Andersen) in a poker game and moves to Quake City, California.

== Cast ==
- Barry Van Dyke as Russell Donovan
- Tim Thomerson as Theodore Ogilvie
- Geoffrey Lewis as Amos Tucker
- Keith Mitchell as Clovis (episodes 1–4)
- Adam Rich as Clovis (episodes 5–6)
- Bridgette Andersen as Celia
- Henry Jones as Homer McCoy
- Janis Paige as Nettie McCoy
- Pat McCormick as Col. Mound

== US TV ratings ==
Season	Episodes	Start date	End date	Nielsen rank	Nielsen rating	Tied with
1982–83	6	March 15, 1983	April 19, 1983	83	N/A	N/A

== Episodes ==
No.	Title	Directed by	Written by	Original release date
1	"Western Velvet"	Peter Baldwin	Eric Cohen; Robert Van Scoyk	March 15, 1983
Donovan wins a horse in a game of cards and gives it to his son, but he later finds out that the horse is a legendary racehorse.
2	"Pardon Me Boy, Is That the Quake City Choo Choo?"	Unknown	Unknown	March 22, 1983
Theodore and Amos are the two only people standing in the way of Quake City becoming a railroad stop. Also stars Noble Willingham.
3	"What Do You Mean We, Amigo?"	Unknown	Unknown	March 29, 1983
A legendary gunfighter (Lyle Waggoner) returns to Quake City. Also stars Burton Gilliam and Royce D. Applegate.
4	"You Gotta Know When to Hold 'Em"	Unknown	Unknown	April 5, 1983
Donavan challenges a card shark (Henry Polic II) who previously beat him in another game of cards.
5	"Reading, Writing and Robbing"	Unknown	Unknown	April 12, 1983
A stagecoach is repeatedly ambushed by robbers. Stars William Cort, Rex Holman and Ruth Buzzi.
6	"Mail Order Mommy"	Unknown	Unknown	April 19, 1983
Amos' mail order bride (Delta Burke) thinks Donovan is the one for her.
