= For Now, For Always =

"For Now, For Always" was a sentimental ballad from the 1961 Disney film, The Parent Trap. It was sung by Maureen O'Hara, and was written by the songwriting brother team of the Robert and Richard Sherman.

According to the Sherman Brothers, the song was meant to be in the style of a 1946 love ballad, perhaps written as World War II was ending or had just ended, so that it could be the song that the twins' parents would have fallen in love to.

== Literary Sources ==
- Sherman, Robert B. Walt's Time: from before to beyond. Santa Clarita: Camphor Tree Publishers, 1998.
