= Leanna Creel =

American former actress, film producer

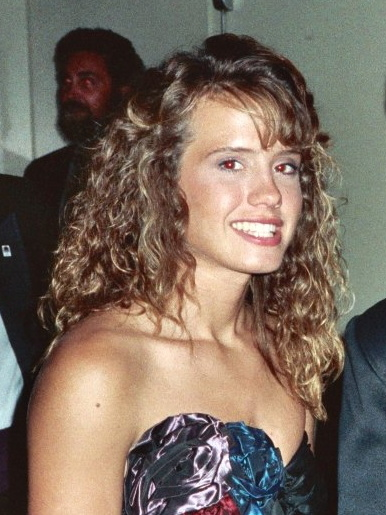
- Creel at the 41st Annual Emmy Awards, 1989
- Education: University of California, Los Angeles
- Occupations: Actress, film producer, film director, screenwriter, photographer
- Years active: 1987–2018
- Spouse: Rinat Greenberg (m. 2008)
- Children: 2
- Relatives: Monica Lacy (sister)

Leanna Creel is an American retired actress, film producer, film director, screenwriter and photographer. She is best known for her role as Tori Scott in the sitcom Saved by the Bell.

== Biography ==
Triplets, Leanna Creel, Joy Creel, and Monica Lacy started acting in the late 1980s. They appeared together in two television movies aired on The Wonderful World of Disney: Parent Trap III and Parent Trap: Hawaiian Honeymoon. In 1992, Leanna had a guest role in an episode of Beverly Hills, 90210, alongside Monica. That same year, she landed the role of Tori in Saved by the Bell. Following her stint on Saved by the Bell, Leanna had a guest role on One West Waikiki.

She attended UCLA and received a bachelor's degree in history, and then a master's degree in film and television.

Creel produced her first film in 1994, helping out a friend whose producer had been involved in a car accident. She also worked for the game Hollywood Stock Exchange (HSX). In 1998 she founded a film production company, Ignite Entertainment, with HSX's Michael Burns as President of Production. Creel founded Creel Studio, a production company specializing in food, travel and lifestyle content and is a photographer and filmmaker. Her last acting credit was in the 2000 film The Cell and her last television or movie producing credit was the 2018 short film The Curse.

== Personal life ==
Creel, who came out as gay, married British studio manager Rinat Greenberg on June 17, 2008, when California legalized same-sex marriages.

== Filmography ==
=== Film ===
| Year | Film | Role | Notes |
|---|---|---|---|
| 1996 | Freeway | Twin No. 2 | - |
| 1997 | Mixed Signals | - | Producer |
| 1998 | Dancer, Texas Pop. 81 | - | Executive producer |
| 1998 | Possums | - | Producer |
| 1998 | Desert Blue | - | Executive producer |
| 1998 | Six-String Samurai | - | Producer |
| 1999 | The Suburbans | - | Producer |
| 1999 | But I'm a Cheerleader | - | Producer |
| 2000 | The Cell | Mother | - |
| 2000 | Queen for a Day | - | Producer |
| 2001 | Get Over It | - | Co-producer |
| 2001 | Offside | - | Director, writer |
| 2005 | Promtroversy | - | Director |
| 2009 | Boutonniere | - | Executive producer |

=== Television ===
| Year | Title | Role | Notes |
|---|---|---|---|
| 1987 | Growing Pains | Schwartz Twins | 1 episode |
| 1989 | Parent Trap III | Lisa Wyatt | Television movie |
| 1989 | My Two Dads | Abby | 1 episode |
| 1989 | CBS Schoolbreak Special | Susan | 1 episode |
| 1989 | Parent Trap: Hawaiian Honeymoon | Lisa Wyatt | Television movie |
| 1991 | Parker Lewis Can't Lose | Kandy | 1 episode |
| 1991 | Perry Mason: The Case of the Fatal Fashion | Shannon Wilson | Television movie |
| 1991 | Anything But Love | | 2 episodes |
| 1992 | Beverly Hills, 90210 | Claire | 1 episode |
| 1992–1993 | Saved by the Bell | Tori Scott | 10 episodes |
| 1996 | One West Waikiki | Marisa Coppage | 1 episode |
