= Michel Hugo =

American cinematographer (1930–2010)

Michael Hugo
- Born: January 13, 1930; Paris, France
- Died: October 12, 2010 (aged 80); Las Vegas, Nevada, United States
- Occupation: Cinematographer

Michel Hugo (January 13, 1930 in Paris, France – October 12, 2010 in Las Vegas, Nevada, United States) was a French-American cinematographer and academic. His film and television credits included Dynasty, Melrose Place and Mission: Impossible. In 2001, Hugo became a professor at the film department of the University of Nevada, Las Vegas.

== Biography ==
Hugo was born in Paris on 13 January 1930. He joined the French Resistance during the German occupation of France during World War II. In the 1950s, Hugo served in the French Army and began working in the Army's camera department. He moved to California during the 1960s.

Hugo began working on his first major television project, Mission: Impossible, in 1967. His film cinematography credits from the era include the 1969 Charlton Heston film Number One, the 1969 film The April Fools which starred Jack Lemmon, and Bless the Beasts and Children in 1971.

He worked on nineteen television episodes of The Streets of San Francisco during the 1970s. He was the cinematographer for Dynasty: The Reunion in 1991 and the Fox television series Melrose Place from 1992 until 1996.

Michel Hugo died of lung cancer in Las Vegas, Nevada, on October 12, 2010, at the age of 80. Hugo was survived by his wife, Gloria, two sons and a daughter. He was remembered by Variety as being "best known as d.p. for skeins “Mission: Impossible,” “Dynasty,” and “Melrose Place.”

== Selected filmography ==
- L'étrange amazone (1953)
- Head (1968)
- Number One (1969)
- The April Fools (1969)
- Model Shop (1969)
- Fools (1970)
- Cover Me Babe (1970)
- R. P. M. (1970)
- The Phynx (1970)
- Bless the Beasts and Children (1971)
- Earth II (1971, TV movie)
- Trouble Man (1972)
- They Only Kill Their Masters (1972)
- One Is a Lonely Number (1972)
- The Night Stalker (1972, TV movie)
- The Spook Who Sat by the Door (1973)
- Mrs. Sundance (1974, TV movie)
- The Morning After (1974, TV movie)
- Murph the Surf (1975)
- Bug (1975)
- Ode to Billy Joe (1976)
- The Manitou (1978)
- The Cracker Factory (1979, TV movie)
- The Octagon (1980)
- The Mountain Men (1980)
- Gorp (1980)
- Pandemonium (1982)
- Will There Really Be a Morning? (1983, TV movie)
- Parent Trap: Hawaiian Honeymoon (1989, TV movie)
