= Parent Trap: Hawaiian Honeymoon =

- Genre: Comedy; Family
- Based on: Characters created by Deborah Amelon; Jill Donner; Erich Kästner
- Written by: John McNamara
- Directed by: Mollie Miller
- Starring: Hayley Mills; Barry Bostwick; John M. Jackson; Sasha Mitchell
- Music by: Joel McNeely
- Country of origin: United States
- Original language: English
- No. of episodes: 2

Production
- Producers: Charles Milhaupt; Richard Luke Rothschild
- Cinematography: Michel Hugo
- Editors: Art Stafford; Karen I. Stern
- Running time: 86 minutes
- Production company: The Walt Disney Company

Original release
- Network: NBC
- Release: November 19 – November 26, 1989

Parent Trap: Hawaiian Honeymoon is a 1989 American made-for-television comedy film and a sequel to Parent Trap III (1989) and the fourth and final installment in the original The Parent Trap series that originally aired two parts as a presentation of The Magical World of Disney on November 19 and 26, 1989. Hayley Mills reprises her roles as twins Susan Wyatt and Sharon Grand; also returning from Parent Trap III is Barry Bostwick and the Creel triplets: Joy, Leanna and Monica. Mollie Miller reunited with the cast to direct this film from the third film. This film was telecast only seven months after the previous sequel.

== Plot ==
After inheriting a family resort in Hawaii from Jeffrey's late aunt, Jeffrey and Susan decide to head for Hawaii with his identical triplet teenage daughters, Lisa, Jessie and Megan, before spending their 2-week honeymoon in Australia, with Susan's twin sister, Sharon, taking care of the girls. They find the resort in a run-down condition and they decide to repair it and sell it. The triplets spend most of their time at the beach having fun and meeting boys. Jeffrey meets an old high school rival, Ray (John M. Jackson), who promises to keep the resort as it is if Jeffrey will sell it to him. However, he has other plans in mind and they are not limited merely to Jeffrey's resort. Meanwhile, a mean resident named Charlotte Brink (Jayne Meadows) causes problems for everyone.

== Cast ==
- Hayley Mills as Susan Wyatt/Sharon Grand
- Barry Bostwick as Jeffrey Wyatt
- Leanna Creel as Lisa Wyatt
- Monica Creel as Jessie Wyatt
- Joy Creel as Megan Wyatt
- Jayne Meadows as Charlotte Brink
- John M. Jackson as Ray
- Sasha Mitchell as Jack
- Glenn Shadix as Chet
- Lightfield Lewis as Tim Harris
- Joe Mays as Ben Milton
- Wayne Federman as The Delivery Man
