= The Parent Trap (song) =

Single by Tommy Sands and Annette Funicello

from the album The Parent Trap
- B-side: "Let's Get Together"
- Released: 1961
- Studio: Sunset Sound, Hollywood
- Genre: Pop
- Length: 2:14
- Label: Buena Vista
- Songwriters: Robert B. Sherman, Richard M. Sherman
- Producer: Salvador Camarata

"The Parent Trap" was the title song from the 1961 Disney film, The Parent Trap. It was sung by teen idols, Annette Funicello and Tommy Sands and it was written by the songwriting brother team of Robert and Richard Sherman.

According to the Sherman Brothers, they raised a concern with Walt Disney when they were given the assignment to write this song. The songwriters believed that it would prove difficult to enunciate the two letter "t"s, one immediately following the other (i.e. "ParenT Trap" would prove difficult to say quickly.) Nevertheless, Disney wanted to keep the title of the film and so the music underneath the title line of the song compensates for this problem by putting a short break between the words.
