= Monica Lacy =

American television and film actress (born 1970)

- Born: Monica Creel; August 27, 1970 (age 55); Los Angeles, California, U.S.
- Occupation: Actress
- Years active: 1987–present
- Spouse: Ross Lacy (m. 1996; div. 2021)
- Children: 2
- Relatives: Leanna Creel (sister)

Monica Lacy (née Creel; born August 27, 1970) is an American television and film actress. Lacy is an identical triplet who, along with her sisters, Leanna and Joy, started acting in the late 1980s. They appeared together in two television movies aired on The Wonderful World of Disney: Parent Trap III and Parent Trap: Hawaiian Honeymoon.

== Biography ==
Monica Lacy grew up in Fullerton, California.

Lacy studied acting with Larry Moss and Howard Fine and took classes at The Groundlings. She's performed stand-up about her unusual childhood behind the ‘Orange Curtain’ and has starred in nearly 200 television commercials; she currently serves as a TV commercial spokesperson for AutoNation.

The Creel sisters, Monica, Joy, and Leanna, appeared in roles together on Growing Pains and Beverly Hills 90210, among others; they also were interviewed on The Tonight Show starring Johnny Carson. While her sisters eventually chose paths away from the spotlight, Monica began appearing in several popular television shows, which included Married... with Children, where she appeared as Esther, a celibate teen-in-distress, whom Bud, who works as a dispatcher for a "Virgin Hotline", must talk into staying celibate in the season 9 episode "Dial "B" for Virgin". Lacy's additional television credits include dating Kramer on the classic Seinfeld episode "The Yada Yada", going through heartbreak on FOX's Party of Five, and an appearance on the Baywatch episode "Shark's Cove" in 1992.

Lacy's more recent television appearances include guest-starring roles on CBS's Hawaii Five-O as an MIT computer scientist and on ABC's Agents of S.H.I.E.L.D. as a suffering wife.

She has also appeared in such films as the Sundance Award-winning Possums, Freeway with Reese Witherspoon, and The Cell alongside Vincent D'Onofrio. She's starred in five hour-long pilots for CBS, MTV, and NBC, including Clyde Phillips' Time Well Spent and the series lead in the 1999 made-for-TV movie Sorority, alongside January Jones and Christina Hendricks.

== Personal life ==
Lacy holds a B.A. in English Literature from UCLA and completed the university's Professional Screenwriting Program.

She and her two children reside in Los Angeles.

== Filmography ==
=== Film ===
Year	Title	Role	Notes
1996	Freeway	Twin #1	
1998	Possums	Sarah Jacobs	
1999	Ladies Room (1999 film)	Assistant (Tony Roman)	
2000	The Cell	Mother	
2004	The Old Man and the Studio	Danielle	Short Film
2006	Paperdolls	Star	
2018	The Legacy of The Parent Trap	Herself	

=== Television ===
Year	Title	Role	Notes
1987	Growing Pains	Schwartz Twins	Episode: "Michaelgate"
1989	Parent Trap III	Jessie Wyatt	Television film
1989	My Two Dads	Cathy	Episode: "Basket Case (My Two Dads episode)"
1989	Parent Trap: Hawaiian Honeymoon	Jessie Wyatt	Television film
1991	Parker Lewis Can't Lose	Barbie	Episode: "King Kube"
1991	Anything But Love	Actress	Episode: "Stop Me Before I... Again: Part 1 & 2"
1992	Baywatch	Debbie Kent	Episode: "Shark's Cove"
1992	Vinnie & Bobby	Actress	Episode: "Vinnie Gets Sued"
1992	Beverly Hills, 90210	Claire / Rory	Episode: "The Twins, the Trustee, and the Very Big Trip"
1993	Sworn to Vengeance	Jesse	Television film
1993	CBS Schoolbreak Special	Tina Kosloski	Episode: "Crosses on the Lawn"
1994	Dead at 21	Younger sister of lead	Pilot Episode
1994	Married... with Children	Esther	Episode: "Dial B for Virgin"
1995	Spring Fling!	Cassie	Television Film
1995	Party of Five	Holly Blanchard	Episode: "Ready or Not" (Party of Five episode)
1996	Time Well Spent	Actress	Television Film
1996	Rattled	Michelle	Television Film
1996	Nowhere Man	Teenage Laura	Episode: "Through a Lens Darkly"
1997	Ned and Stacey	Lauren	Episode: "Scenes from a Muffin Shop"
1997	Seinfeld	Julie	Episode: "The Yada Yada"
1999	Sorority	Jesse Sloan	Television Film
2013	Hawaii Five-0	Sandra Cutler	Episode: "A ia la aku" & "Kupu'eu"
2014	Hairapy	Lacey	Episode: "BFFWTF!"
2014	Agents of S.H.I.E.L.D.	Katie Thompson	Episode: "The Writing on the Wall"
2015	The Advocate	Shirley	Television Film
2015	The Kicks	Sharon Burke	
