= The Parent Trap (1961 film) =

1961 film by David Swift

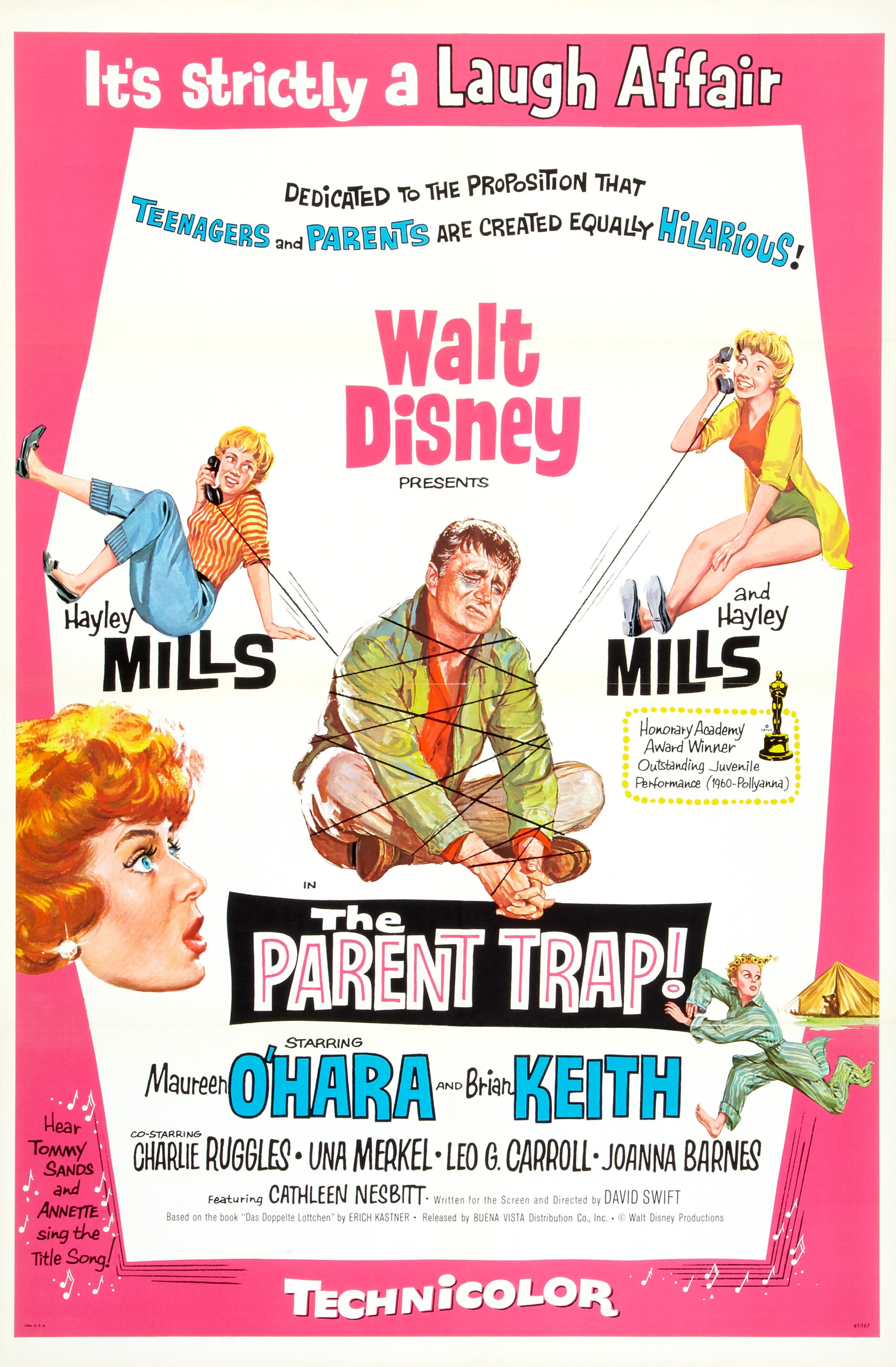
- Theatrical release poster by Reynold Brown
- Directed by: David Swift
- Screenplay by: David Swift
- Based on: Das doppelte Lottchen by Erich Kästner
- Produced by: George Golitzen; Walt Disney
- Starring: Hayley Mills; Maureen O'Hara; Brian Keith; Charlie Ruggles; Una Merkel; Leo G. Carroll; Joanna Barnes; Cathleen Nesbitt
- Cinematography: Lucien Ballard
- Edited by: Philip W. Anderson
- Music by: Songs: Richard M. Sherman; Robert B. Sherman; Score: Paul Smith
- Production company: Walt Disney Productions
- Distributed by: Buena Vista Distribution
- Release date: June 21, 1961
- Running time: 128 minutes
- Country: United States
- Language: English
- Box office: $25.1 million

The Parent Trap is a 1961 American romantic comedy film written and directed by David Swift. It stars Hayley Mills in a dual role as a pair of teenage twins who switch places with each other in order to reunite their divorced parents, played by Maureen O'Hara and Brian Keith. Although the plot is very close to that of the 1945 film Twice Blessed, The Parent Trap is based on the 1949 children's novel Das doppelte Lottchen by German author Erich Kästner.

Produced by Walt Disney Productions, The Parent Trap was released on June 21, 1961, by Buena Vista Distribution. It grossed $25.1 million at the box office and was nominated for two Academy Awards. It was broadcast on television, and three television sequels followed the later adventures of the twins. The film was remade in 1998 with Lindsay Lohan in the lead role as the twins. It was released on VHS, in digital stereo LaserDisc format (1986), and on DVD (2002). The Parent Trap was the second of six films Mills made for Disney.

== Plot ==
Teenagers Sharon McKendrick and Susan Evers meet at a girls summer camp. Their identical appearance causes jealousy, resentment, and a rivalry in which they continually get each other into trouble and disrupt camp activities. As punishment, they must spend the remainder of the camp season rooming and dining together in isolation. They overcome their mutual dislike when they realize that they are identical twin sisters, whom their parents, Mitch and Maggie, separated upon divorcing shortly after their birth. Eager to meet the parents from whom they were separated, they decide to cut their hair identically, coach each other on their lives, and switch places.

In Boston with their mother and grandparents, Susan poses as Sharon, while Sharon goes to Mitch's California ranch as Susan. Sharon learns that Mitch is engaged to a much younger woman, Vicky Robinson, who is interested only in Mitch's money and intends to send Susan to boarding school after the wedding. The girls communicate by phone at night. Susan tells Sharon to break up the couple, but when that fails, Susan decides to end the charade. After a happy reunion, Maggie brings her to California. Mitch is upset by Maggie's unexpected arrival, until he learns the truth and is reunited with both daughters. Vicky is jealous of Maggie, who is staying at the ranch.

The girls scheme to reunite their parents by recreating Maggie and Mitch's first date. At first, the ex-spouses are drawn together, but then they argue over why they divorced. They make up before Maggie and Sharon are to leave the next morning, and Maggie wishes Mitch well with Vicky. To delay the return to Boston, the twins dress and act alike, so their parents cannot tell them apart. They refuse to reveal their identities unless the family takes a camping trip. Mitch and Maggie reluctantly agree, and Vicky, who loathes the outdoors, is furious. Maggie cajoles Vicky into taking her place, wanting to give Vicky a chance to become better acquainted with each twin.

The twins take every opportunity to exploit Vicky's hatred of camping, pulling a series of pranks on her. That night, both sneak into her tent and pour honey over Vicky's feet and leave a small honey trail outside the tent. Vicky awakens the following morning to find two bear cubs licking the honey off her feet to which she has a tantrum over her hatred of the outdoors and the twins. She further says all the trouble she has been through does not make marrying Mitch for his money worth it and storms off.

Back at the house, the twins apologize for their actions; Mitch accepts their apology and says they do not have to discuss the situation anymore. Maggie and Sharon prepare to return to Boston the next day, with the twins now resigned to seeing each other only during visits and shuttling back and forth between parents. Later, Mitch tells Maggie everything he misses about her and their marriage. They realize that they still love each other. The film ends with their second wedding, with Susan and Sharon as their bridesmaids.

== Cast ==
- Hayley Mills as Susan Evers and Sharon McKendrick
  - Susan Henning (uncredited) as Mills's body double
- Brian Keith as Mitchell "Mitch" Evers
- Maureen O'Hara as Margaret "Maggie" McKendrick
- Joanna Barnes as Vicky Robinson
- Charlie Ruggles as Charles McKendrick, Susan and Sharon's maternal grandfather
- Cathleen Nesbitt as Louise McKendrick, Susan and Sharon's maternal grandmother
- Una Merkel as Verbena, the Evers family's housekeeper
- Leo G. Carroll as Reverend Dr. Mosby
- Linda Watkins as Edna Robinson, Vicky's mother
- Ruth McDevitt as Miss Abbey Inch
- Crahan Denton as Hecky, the Evers family's ranch foreman
- Nancy Kulp as Miss Grunecker
- Frank De Vol as Mr. Eaglewood

== Production ==
The source material, Das doppelte Lottchen, was discovered by Disney's story editor Bill Dover, who recommended the studio buy it.

In March 1960, Disney announced that Hayley Mills would star in His and Hers to be written and directed by David Swift. Swift and Mills had just made Pollyanna for Disney. It was also known as Petticoats and Blue Jeans and was the first in a five-film contract Mills signed with Disney, to make one each summer.

Maureen O'Hara signed in June. She wrote in her memoirs that Disney offered her a third of her normal fee of $75,000 but that she held out for her quote and got it. O'Hara said her contract gave her top billing but that Disney decided to give that to Mills; she says this caused tension with the studio and was why she never worked with Disney again.

Production started in July under the title of We Belong Together and went until September.

The production used split screen technology to create the effect of Mills playing both girls, with Susan Henning acting as a body double as part of the filming process.

The film was shot mostly at various locales in California. The summer camp scenes were filmed at Bluff Lake Camp (then owned by the Pasadena YMCA, now by Habonim Dror's Camp Gilboa) and the family camping scenes later in the movie at Cedar Lake Camp, both in the San Bernardino Mountains near the city of Big Bear Lake in Southern California. The Monterey scenes were filmed in various California locations, including millionaire Stuyvesant Fish's 5,200 acres (21 km^{2}) ranch in Carmel and Monterey's Pebble Beach golf course. The scenes at the Monterey house were shot at the studio's Golden Oak Ranch in Placerita Canyon, where Mitch's ranch was built. It was the design of this set that proved the most popular, and to this day the Walt Disney Archives receives requests for plans of the home's interior design. In fact, there never was such a house; the set was simply various rooms built on a sound stage. Camp Inch was based on a real girls' camp called Camp Crestridge for Girls at the Ridgecrest Baptist Conference Center near Asheville, North Carolina.

In 1962, a year after Disney adapted Das doppelte Lottchen into The Parent Trap, Cyrus Brooks translated the German book into English as Lisa and Lottie, an edition still published in the United States and Canada.

In 2014, Das doppelte Lottchen was faithfully retranslated into English by Anthea Bell and republished in the United Kingdom and Australia by Pushkin Press as The Parent Trap, after the hit Disney film. Then in 2020, Australian actress Ruby Rees recorded an unabridged narration of Bell's translation for Bolinda.

== Musical numbers ==
Richard and Robert Sherman provided the songs, which, besides the title song "The Parent Trap", includes "For Now, For Always", and "Let's Get Together". "Let's Get Together" (sung by Annette Funicello) is heard playing from a record player at the summer camp; the tune is reprised by the twins when they restage their parents' first date and that version is sung double-tracked by Hayley Mills (Hayley's own single of the song, credited to "Hayley Mills and Hayley Mills", reached #8 on the US charts). The film's title song was performed by Tommy Sands and Annette Funicello, who were both on the studio lot shooting Babes in Toyland at the time. The campers whistle the 1914 marching song, "Colonel Bogey March", as they march through camp, mirroring the scene from The Bridge on the River Kwai.

== Reception ==
=== Box office ===
The Parent Trap was a huge success at the box office. It grossed an estimated $9.3 million in the United States.

=== Critical response ===
Bosley Crowther of The New York Times wrote that "it should be most appealing to adults, as well as to children, because of the cheerfully persuasive dual performance of Hayley Mills". Variety stated that the film was "absolutely predictable from the outset", but was still "a winner" thanks to the performance of Mills, who "seems to have an instinctive sense of comedy and an uncanny ability to react in just the right manner. Her contribution to the picture is virtually infinite". Charles Stinson of the Los Angeles Times declared it "a comedy unusually well designed for the entire family — enough sight gags to keep the children screaming and enough clever dialogue to amuse their parents". Harrison's Reports graded the film as "Very Good" and Richard L. Coe of The Washington Post called it "charmingly lively" even though "the terrain is familiar".

On the review aggregator website Rotten Tomatoes, the film holds an approval rating of 89% based on 19 reviews, with an average rating of 6.8/10.

=== Accolades ===
The film was nominated for two Academy Awards: one for Sound by Robert O. Cook, and the other for Film Editing by Philip W. Anderson. The film and its editor, Philip W. Anderson, won the inaugural 1962 Eddie Award of the American Cinema Editors.

Award	Year	Category	Recipient(s)	Result
Academy Awards	1962	Best Sound	Robert O. Cook	Nominated
Academy Awards	1962	Best Film Editing	Philip W. Anderson	Nominated
Eddie Award	1962	Best Edited Feature Film - Comedy or Musical	Philip W. Anderson	Won

== Subsequent developments ==
In 1961, a comic book version of the film was published, adapted, and illustrated by Dan Spiegle.

The film was theatrically re-released in 1968 and earned $1.8 million in rentals.

The Disney Studios produced three television sequels The Parent Trap II (1986), Parent Trap III (1989) and Parent Trap: Hawaiian Honeymoon (1989). The original was remade in 1998 starring Lindsay Lohan, Dennis Quaid, and Natasha Richardson. Joanna Barnes also made an appearance as Vicki Blake, the mother of Dennis Quaid's character's fiancée, Meredith.

In 2018, a potential remake of The Parent Trap was considered for Walt Disney Studios' streaming service Disney+.

In India, there have been several films inspired by The Parent Trap. In 1965, a Tamil language version of the story called Kuzhandaiyum Deivamum, starring Kutty Padmini was released. The following year, it was remade into Telugu as Leta Manasulu also starring Kutty Padmini. A Hindi version Do Kaliyaan starring Neetu Singh in the double role was made in 1968. The 1987 film Pyar Ke Kabil also has a similar storyline, as does the 2001 film Kuch Khatti Kuch Meethi which has Kajol playing the double role of 23-year-old twins.

== Home media ==
The Parent Trap was initially released on VHS tape cassettes by Walt Disney Home Video on April 7, 1984, and on May 28, 1986, as part of Disney's "Wonderland Campaign".

The film was released on a 2-disc special edition DVD in May 2002, as part of the Vault Disney collection, with a new digital remaster by THX.

In 2005, the film was once again released in a 2-Movie Collection, which also contained the made-for-television sequel, The Parent Trap II (1986), plus the original film trailer and other bonus features.

The film was released for the first time on Blu-ray, but as a Disney Movie Club exclusive on April 24, 2018. The 1998 remake was also released on Blu-ray the same day.

== See also ==
- List of American films of 1961
- Lost Treasures: "Who's the Twin?". Interview with Actress Susan Henning Schutte. Parent Trap (1961).

== Bibliography ==
- O'Hara, Maureen; Nicoletti, John (2004). 'Tis Herself: A Memoir. Simon & Schuster. ISBN 9780743246934.
