= Corey Brunish =

American singer, actor, director, and writer

Corey Frederick Brunish
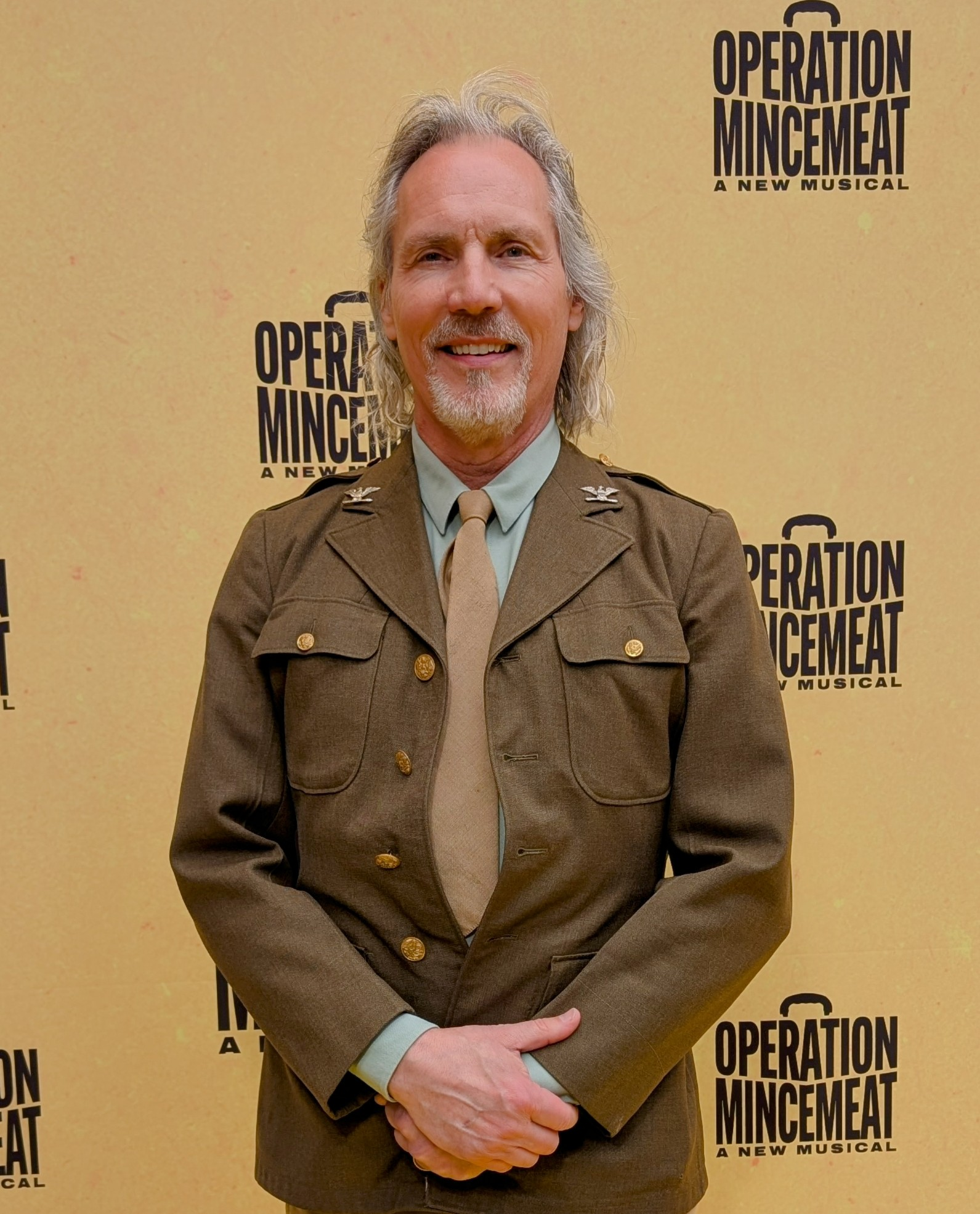
- Brunish in 2025
- Born: July 7, 1955 (age 71); Los Angeles, California
- Occupations: Philanthropist; theatrical producer; musical producer; Theatrical Donor
- Known for: Broadway Producer; Actor; theatrical producer; musical producer
- Parents: Robert Brunish (father); Virginia Hughes (mother)
- Relatives: Bonnie Brunish (sister); Wendee Brunish (sister)
- Musical career
- Genre: Musical theater
- Website: https://www.brunishfamily.com/Corey/Corey.html

Corey Frederick Brunish (born 7 July 1955) is an American actor and writer.

== Early life ==
In 1977, Brunish received a BA in Theatre Arts from Occidental College cum laude.

== Career ==
=== Acting career ===
In 1977, Brunish began his acting career appearing in shows in repertory at the Remsen Bird Theatre. He moved to Oregon and worked as a property developer while appearing in theatre productions, indie movies, TV shows and feature films.

In 2022, Brunish appeared in Claydream, a documentary about the invention of Claymation by Will Vinton.

=== Music career ===
In February 2017, Brunish released his debut solo album on Broadway Records: #ThrowbackThursday. His follow-up CD Just The Three Of Us was released in December 2020.

In 2022, with the release of the CD of the cast recording of Music Man, Brunish had written his second set of liner notes for a Broadway cast recording, following Bonnie & Clyde in 2012.

Brunish helped to produce the soundtrack for Nice Work If you Can Get It; the CD was nominated for a Grammy Award. He has been credited on two Grammy winning cast albums, namely The Color Purple and Beautiful The Carole King Musical.

Brunish sings the role of Utterson on the Jekyll & Hyde cast album with Constantine, Teal Wicks and Deborah Cox.

=== Film and TV producer ===
In collaboration with Spencer Proffer and Russell Miller, Brunish produces documentary films, streaming content and new works for Broadway.

=== Theater ===
==== Director ====
In 2009, he directed Stephen Sondheim's Company.

==== Producer and investor ====
Brunish came to New York as assistant director and producer of Bonnie & Clyde, and was also a producer of the show's cast album.

In 2021, Brunish was nominated for a Grammy Award as a producer on the theatre album Snapshots by Stephen Schwartz, released on Broadway Records. Two cast albums Brunish is named on have won the Grammy. They include Beautiful The Carole King Musical and The Color Purple.

== Tony Awards ==
Brunish has received 20 consecutive nominations in 12 seasons and five Tony Awards. In 2012, he received a Tony as producer for Porgy and Bess, which won Best Musical Revival. In 2013, Brunish received a second Tony Award as a producer of the revival of Pippin. He also was the recipient of the 2013 Drama Desk Award, Drama League Award and the Outer Critics Circle Award for the same show. In 2017, he was awarded The Olivier Award for Come From Away. In 2018, Brunish received his ninth consecutive nomination and third Tony award for Once on This Island. In 2020, he garnered his 11th consecutive Tony nomination for Slave Play with a producing credit. At the time the show also held the record for most Tony Award nominations in history for a play with 12 nominations.

In 2021, the Tony Award-winning revival of Company, for which Brunish was a producer, was awarded Outstanding Broadway Production at the 33rd Annual GLAAD Media Awards, tied with Thoughts of a Colored Man.

== Personal life ==
Brunish is married to Jessica Rose Brunish and they have a daughter.

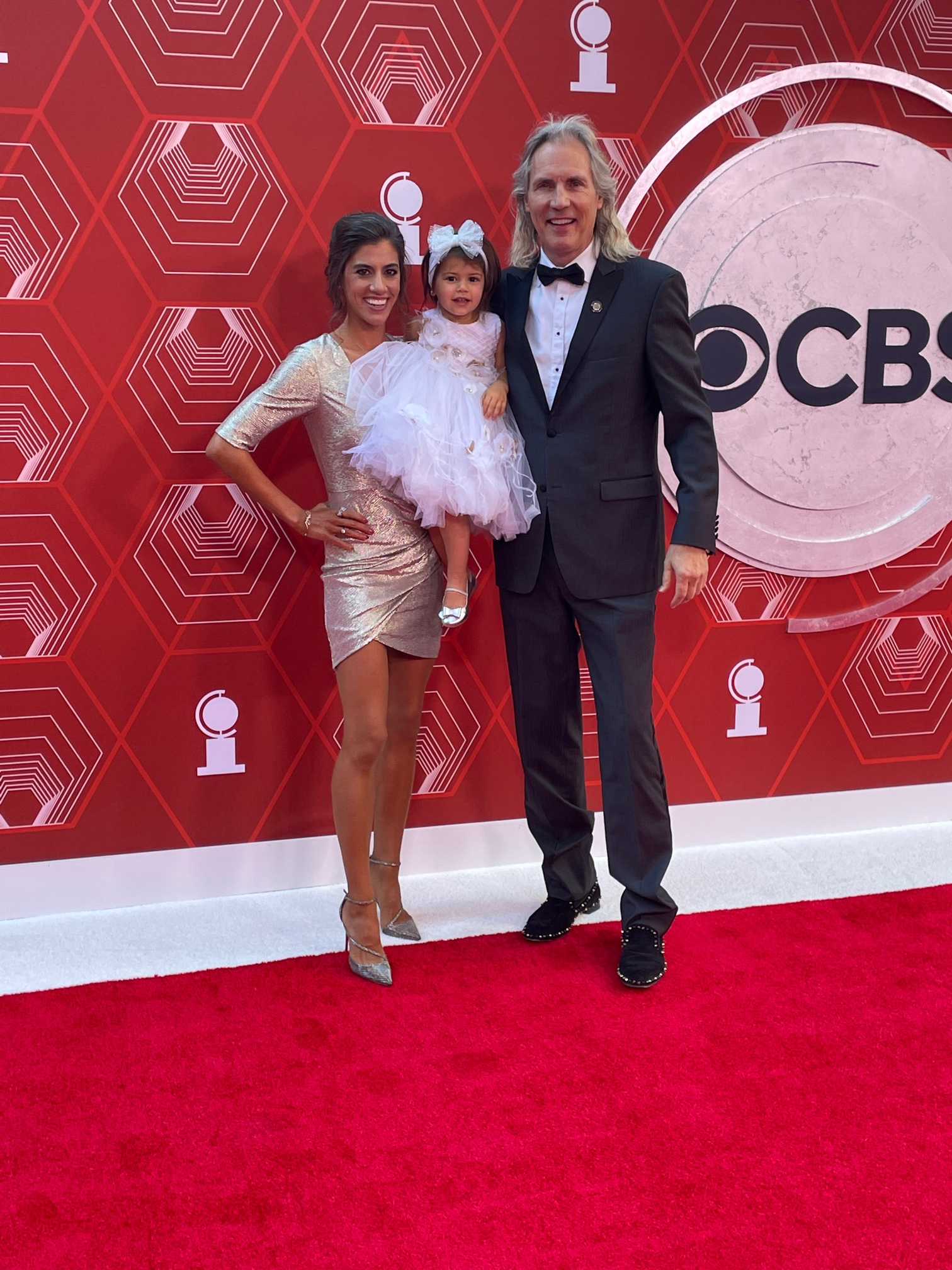
Jessica, Olivia, and Corey

== Philanthropy ==
In December 2023, Brunish served as a judge for the Red Bucket Follies, a fundraiser for Broadway Cares, which raised over $4.5 million. He serves as an investor in The Museum of Broadway.
