= The Parent Trap II =

1986 television film

- Genre: Comedy; Family
- Based on: Characters created by Erich Kästner
- Written by: Stuart Krieger
- Directed by: Ronald F. Maxwell
- Starring: Hayley Mills; Tom Skerritt; Carrie Kei Heim; Bridgette Andersen
- Music by: Charles Fox
- Country of origin: United States
- Original language: English

Production
- Executive producers: Joan Barnett; Alan Landsburg
- Producer: Joan Barnett
- Cinematography: Peter Stein
- Editor: Corky Ehlers
- Running time: 81 minutes
- Production companies: The Landsburg Company; Walt Disney Television

Original release
- Network: Disney Channel
- Release: July 26, 1986

The Parent Trap II is a 1986 American made-for-television comedy film and a sequel to Disney's 1961 film The Parent Trap (which was based on the 1949 book Lisa and Lottie by Erich Kästner). It is part of The Parent Trap series that premiered on the Disney Channel on July 26, 1986 as a part of the channel's "Hayley Mills Film Festival" banner. Hayley Mills is the only actress who returned from the original film, reprising her dual roles of Susan McKendrick and Sharon Evers, the twins who were separated at birth, met 12 years later at summer camp, switched places and reunited their divorced parents (only to get married themselves, with Susan marrying Brian, a pilot for Trans World Airlines; Sharon's husband was never revealed). The film focuses on Nicole Evers a.k.a. "Nikki" (Carrie Kei Heim in her final role before retiring), who tries to match Sharon with Bill Grand (Tom Skerritt) after she befriends Bill's daughter Mary (Bridgette Andersen). It was a success for the Disney Channel and it later spawned two more made-for-television sequels, both produced in 1989.

== Plot ==
The film takes place 25 years after the original film. Sharon Ferris (née McKendrick) (Mills) is divorced and living as a single mother in Tampa, Florida. Her daughter, Nicole a.k.a. "Nikki" (Heim), is not happy about their impending move to New York City and Sharon's decision to send her to an all-girls school in the fall. While in summer school, Nikki makes enemies with Jessica Dintruff (Judith Tannen) but befriends Mary Grand (Andersen). Mary's father, Bill (Skerritt), has been widowed for four years. To stop Nikki from moving to New York City and see their parents happily married all at the same time, the girls scheme to set them up by tricking their parents into meeting each other by sending Sharon flowers that are supposedly from Bill, but they do not fall madly in love with each other as the girls hoped, so they contact Sharon's twin sister, Susan Carey (née Evers) (Mills in a dual role), who is married and still living in California. Susan is convinced by the girls to fly to Tampa to help them by posing as Sharon and going on a few dates just to get things started. Susan, disguised as Sharon, "accidentally" bumps into Bill at a bar called the Press Box and watches a few innings of a baseball game with him. The real Sharon detests baseball and is confused when Bill drops by her workplace the next day and mentions how much fun they had. Susan and Bill cross paths a few more times over the next few days. Bill and Mary's maid, Florence (Gloria Cromwell), begin to suspect that something is awry. Florence isn't the only one to suspect something awry, though, as Sharon discovers the girls' scheme and decides to trick them instead by contacting her brother-in-law Brian, who is a pilot for Trans World Airlines and involves him in her scheme. While Susan and Bill are on a date, the real Sharon and Brian pretend to also be on one in the same restaurant, with Sharon disguised as a brunette. Susan becomes distracted and clumsy on her date while watching her husband. Finally having had enough, she announces to Bill that the man she is watching is Brian. She storms over to their table but begins laughing when she sees Sharon underneath a black wig. Susan and Sharon clear up the situation for Bill and Sharon says that she does not have romantic feelings for him and would like it if they just remained friends. A going-away party is thrown for Sharon and Nikki on the sailboat of her boss, Mr. Elias. Sharon and Bill meet in the cabin while Nikki and Mary pretend to retrieve something from the car. The girls release the ropes from the sailboat and push it from the dock. The other guests begin arriving and watch helplessly as the boat drifts away. Sharon and Bill are enjoying each other's company, but wonder where everyone is. They go to the deck, see how far out they are from the shore and then Bill kisses Sharon. The scene switches to the wedding. Mary and Nikki are finally step-sisters and Nikki doesn't have to move to New York City after all.

== Cast ==
- Hayley Mills as Sharon Ferris/Susan Carey
- Tom Skerritt as Bill Grand
- Carrie Kei Heim as Nicole "Nikki" Ferris
- Bridgette Andersen as Mary Grand
- Alex Harvey as Brian Carey
- Gloria Cromwell as Florence
- Judith Tannen as Jessica Dintruff

== Production ==
=== Writing ===
The idea of a second film was announced in 1985. On her interview with Good Morning America that year, Mills wasn't sure about reprising her role as the twins: "I was astonished. I thought what they wanted to do was try to repeat the original film in some way. I wasn't too sure that was a very good idea. It was a good film and it has passed the test of time," Mills said to the Chicago Sun-Times. She also further explained about her involvement in the sequel: "I did hesitate before saying yes, first because it was always my favorite film and I wasn't sure about making a sequel. Second, because it's taken me so long to try to break away from my Disney image. It's been a real impediment toward getting the kind of roles I want. But everyone at Disney was so enthusiastic about the project that I finally agreed to do it. And I think it's turned out well." The film was written by Stuart Krieger. In the original draft of the script, Sharon was going to have a son, instead of a daughter like in the film. This was changed when rewrites of the script were ordered. The names of Nikki Ferris and Mary Grand are the names of the characters that Mills portrayed in the Disney films The Moon-Spinners and In Search of the Castaways. Director Ronald F. Maxwell revealed that this was a homage to Mills' films with The Walt Disney Company. The characters of Walter and Lillian Elias are named after Walt Disney and his wife (Disney's full name was Walter Elias Disney; Lillian was his wife's name).

=== Filming ===
Ronald F. Maxwell was chosen to direct this sequel, taking over from the original's director David Swift. When the film premiered on the Disney Channel, a documentary titled On Location: Parent Trap II accompanied it. The documentary included footage of Mills as she describes the production of the film and her history with the Disney films. Filming took place for three weeks in Tampa. The interiors of Robert E. Lee Elementary and the exteriors of Mitchell Elementary were used as the summer school that Nikki and Mary both attend. The film was shot in 18 days. Mills said that "I never worked so hard in my life." A local Publix on Gandy Boulevard was used as the grocery store where Susan and Sharon narrowly miss meeting each other. It has since been torn down and rebuilt twice.

=== Music ===
The film's score was composed by Charles Fox. The theme song is "Let's Keep What We've Got" written by Fox and Hal David and performed by Marilyn McCoo. The theme song is played over the opening credits, which shows clips from the original The Parent Trap movie play and is reprised during the closing credits when the final scene (Nikki and Mary, as junior bridesmaids/flower girls, walk up the aisle after their parents' wedding) is frozen. Other songs in the film include "Nothin' at All" sung by Andrea Robinson, who would later voice Ariel's mother, Athena, in Disney's The Little Mermaid: Ariel's Beginning and "Stand Back," sung by Phyllis St. James.
