= Joel McNeely =

American composer (born 1959)

Background information
- Born: March 28, 1959 (age 67); Madison, Wisconsin, U.S.
- Genres: Film score, pop, jazz
- Occupations: Composer, conductor, arranger, pianist, musician, songwriter, producer
- Instruments: Piano, organ, keyboard, backing vocals
- Years active: 1986–present
- Label: Republic
- Website: www.joelmcneely.com

Joel McNeely (born March 28, 1959) is an American composer, conductor, arranger, musician, lyricist, and record producer. A protégé of composer Jerry Goldsmith, he is best known for his film and television scores. He won the Primetime Emmy Award for Outstanding Music Composition for a Series for his work on George Lucas's The Young Indiana Jones Chronicles. He frequently collaborates with Seth MacFarlane and contributes to various projects by The Walt Disney Company.

== Biography ==
Joel McNeely was born in Madison, Wisconsin. Both of his parents were involved in music and theater, and as a child he played the piano, saxophone, bass, and flute. He attended the Interlochen Arts Academy in Michigan, studied jazz at the University of Miami, and earned a master's degree as a composition major at the Eastman School of Music.

LucasArts chose McNeely to compose the soundtrack to the 1996 Star Wars video game, Shadows of the Empire, while incorporating the themes from the films by John Williams. This was an experimental project where he conveyed general moods and themes instead of writing music to flow for specific scenes.

He is also known for conducting a series of re-recordings of film scores by Bernard Herrmann, Franz Waxman, John Barry, and other composers under the label of Varèse Sarabande, including those Herrmann wrote for Vertigo, Psycho and Citizen Kane. He also composed the score for The Avengers and the theme and music for FOX's Dark Angel. Additionally, he scored the movies Terminal Velocity, Iron Will (which was used in the teaser trailer to Toy Story, the theatrical trailer to Balto, the direct-to-video trailer to Balto III: Wings of Change, and the VHS trailer to Mulan), Flipper, Gold Diggers, Samantha, Virus, and I Know Who Killed Me. He also scored a multitude of Disney animated films (Mulan II, Return to Never Land, The Jungle Book 2, Tinker Bell and many others).

Currently McNeely scores occasional episodes of the FOX animated TV series American Dad!, since the fourth season replacing Ron Jones who left to focus more on composing for Family Guy, including the episode with the Back to the Future parody, and the season five premiere (among others).

McNeely has also composed the score for Disneyland Paris's Entertainment Shows including: Disney Dreams! & Mickey and the Magician, and Tokyo Disneyland's Disney Gifts of Christmas.

McNeely has produced three of Seth MacFarlane's studio albums, including 2011's Music Is Better Than Words, 2014's Holiday for Swing, and 2017's In Full Swing.

In 2017, he composed a score for MacFarlane's new series, The Orville, along with Bruce Broughton and John Debney.

== Filmography ==
=== Film ===
==== 1980s ====
Year	Title	Director(s)	Studio(s)	Notes
1987	You Talkin' to Me?	Charles Winkler	United Artists	—N/a
1988	Splash, Too	Greg Antonacci	Walt Disney Television; ABC	TV movie
1989	Parent Trap III	Mollie Miller	Walt Disney Television; Disney Channel	Television film
1989	Polly	Debbie Allen	Walt Disney Television; NBC	TV movie
1989	Parent Trap: Hawaiian Honeymoon	Mollie Miller	Walt Disney Television; NBC	Television film

==== 1990s ====
Year	Title	Director(s)	Studio(s)	Notes
1990	Hitler's Daughter	James A. Contner	Wilshire Court Productions; USA Network	TV movie
1990	Polly: Comin' Home!	Debbie Allen	Walt Disney Television; NBC	TV movie
1991	Frankenstein: The College Years	Tom Shadyac	Fox	TV movie
1991	Samantha	Stephen La Rocque	Academy Entertainment	—N/a
1992	Lady Against the Odds	Bradford May	MGM Television; NBC	TV movie
1992	Police Story 3: Super Cop	Stanley Tong	Dimension Films	US version
1994	Iron Will	Charles Haid	Walt Disney Pictures	—N/a
1994	Radioland Murders	Mel Smith	Lucasfilm; Universal Pictures	—N/a
1994	Squanto: A Warrior's Tale	Xavier Koller; Christopher Stoia	Walt Disney Pictures	—N/a
1994	Terminal Velocity	Deran Sarafian	Nomura Babcock & Brown; Interscope Communications; PolyGram Filmed Entertainment; Hollywood Pictures	—N/a
1995	Gold Diggers: The Secret of Bear Mountain	Kevin James Dobson	Bregman/Baer Productions; Universal Pictures	—N/a
1996	Flipper	Alan Shapiro	The Bubble Factory; Universal Pictures	—N/a
1997	Vegas Vacation	Stephen Kessler	Jerry Weintraub Productions; Warner Bros. Pictures	—N/a
1997	Wild America	William Dear	Morgan Creek Productions; Warner Bros. Pictures	—N/a
1997	Buffalo Soldiers	Charles Haid	Turner Pictures; TNT	TV movie
1997	Air Force One	Wolfgang Petersen	Columbia Pictures; Beacon Pictures; Sony Pictures Releasing (United States and Canada); Buena Vista International (International)	Additional music only. Score composed by Jerry Goldsmith
1998	The Avengers	Jeremiah S. Chechik	Warner Bros. Pictures	Replaced Michael Kamen
1998	Zack and Reba	Nicole Bettauer	Live Entertainment	—N/a
1998	Soldier	Paul W. S. Anderson	Morgan Creek Productions; Jerry Weintraub Productions; Warner Bros. Pictures	—N/a
1999	Virus	John Bruno	Mutual Film Company; Valhalla Motion Pictures; Dark Horse Entertainment; Universal Pictures	—N/a
1999	Road Rage	Deran Sarafian	NBC Studios; NBC	TV movie

==== 2000s ====
Year	Title	Director(s)	Studio(s)	Notes
2000	Sally Hemings: An American Scandal	Charles Haid	CBS Productions; CBS	TV movie
2000	Santa Who?	William Dear	ABC	TV movie
2001	Lover's Prayer	Reverge Anselmo	Image Entertainment	—N/a
2002	Return to Never Land	Robin Budd; Donovan Cook	DisneyToon Studios; A. Film A/S; Walt Disney Pictures	First theatrical score for an animated film
2003	The Jungle Book 2	Steve Trenbirth	DisneyToon Studios; Walt Disney Pictures	—N/a
2003	Ghosts of the Abyss	James Cameron	Ascot Elite; Golden Village; Walden Media; Walt Disney Pictures (North America); UGC Fox Distribution (International)	—N/a
2003	Holes	Andrew Davis	Phoenix Pictures; Walden Media; Walt Disney Pictures	—N/a
2003	Destino	Dominique Monféry	Walt Disney Feature Animation; Walt Disney Pictures	Short film
2003	Uptown Girls	Boaz Yakin	Metro-Goldwyn-Mayer	—N/a
2004	Stateside	Reverge Anselmo	Samuel Goldwyn Films	—N/a
2004	America's Heart and Soul	Louis Schwartzberg	Walt Disney Pictures	—N/a
2004	Mulan II	Darrell Rooney; Lynne Southerland	Walt Disney Studios Home Entertainment; DisneyToon Studios	Direct-to-video film
	The Stepford Wives	Frank Oz	Paramount Pictures DreamWorks Pictures	Additional music only. Score composed by Piotr Olszewski.
2005	Pooh's Heffalump Movie	Frank Nissen	Walt Disney Pictures; DisneyToon Studios	—N/a
2005	Lilo & Stitch 2: Stitch Has a Glitch	Michael LaBash; Tony Leondis	Walt Disney Studios Home Entertainment; DisneyToon Studios	Direct-to-video film
2006	Franklin and the Turtle Lake Treasure	Dominique Monféry	Nelvana; StudioCanal	—N/a
2006	The Fox and the Hound 2	Jim Kammerud	Walt Disney Studios Home Entertainment; DisneyToon Studios	Direct-to-video film
2007	Cinderella III: A Twist in Time	Frank Nissen	Walt Disney Studios Home Entertainment; DisneyToon Studios	Direct-to-video film
2007	I Know Who Killed Me	Chris Sivertson	360 Pictures; TriStar Pictures	—N/a
2008	Tinker Bell	Bradley Raymond	Walt Disney Studios Home Entertainment; DisneyToon Studios	Direct-to-video film
2009	Tinker Bell and the Lost Treasure	Klay Hall	Walt Disney Studios Home Entertainment; DisneyToon Studios	Direct-to-video film

==== 2010s ====
Year	Title	Director(s)	Studio(s)	Notes
2010	Tinker Bell and the Great Fairy Rescue	Bradley Raymond	Walt Disney Studios Home Entertainment; DisneyToon Studios	Direct-to-video film
2011	Pixie Hollow Games	Bradley Raymond	Walt Disney Studios Home Entertainment; DisneyToon Studios	Television special
2012	Secret of the Wings	Bobs Gannaway; Peggy Holmes	Walt Disney Studios Home Entertainment; DisneyToon Studios	Direct-to-video film
2014	The Pirate Fairy	Peggy Holmes	Walt Disney Studios Home Entertainment; DisneyToon Studios	Direct-to-video film
2014	A Million Ways to Die in the West	Seth MacFarlane	Fuzzy Door Productions; Media Rights Capital; Universal Pictures	—N/a
2014	Tinker Bell and the Legend of the NeverBeast	Steve Loter	Walt Disney Studios Home Entertainment; DisneyToon Studios	Direct-to-video film

=== Television ===
Years	Title	Notes
1986	Blacke's Magic	
1986–1988	Our House	
1988	Aaron's Way	
1988	Blue Skies	Episode: "Something Wold, Something New"
1989	The Wonder Years	Episode: "Square Dance"
1990	Tiny Toon Adventures	3 episodes
1991	Darkwing Duck	Episode: "Beauty and the Beet"
1992	The Plucky Duck Show	2 episodes
1992–1993	The Young Indiana Jones Chronicles	9 episodes
1998	Buddy Faro	
2000–2002	Dark Angel	
2001	All Souls	
2002	The Court	
2009–present	American Dad!	
2017–2022	The Orville	with John Debney, Bruce Broughton (pilot and theme only) and Andrew Cottee

=== Video games ===
Years	Title	Notes
1996	Star Wars: Shadows of the Empire	Original Star Wars themes by John Williams

== Awards and nominations ==
Year	Award	Nominated work	Result
1993	Primetime Emmy Award for Outstanding Individual Achievement in Music Composition for a Series (Dramatic Underscore)	The Young Indiana Jones Chronicles: Young Indiana Jones and the Scandal of 1920	Won
1993	Primetime Emmy Award for Outstanding Music Direction	The Young Indiana Jones Chronicles: Young Indiana Jones and the Mystery of the Blues	Nominated
1998	ASCAP Award for Top Box Office Films	Air Force One	Won
2003	Annie Award for Music in a Feature Production	Return to Never Land	Nominated
2012	Grammy Award for Best Traditional Pop Vocal Album	Music Is Better Than Words	Nominated
2012	Annie Award for Best Music in a Television Production	Pixie Hollow Games	Nominated
2012	International Film Music Critics Award for Best Original Score for an Animated Film	Secret of the Wings	Nominated
2012	Primetime Emmy Award for Outstanding Music Direction	Seth MacFarlane: Swingin' in Concert	Nominated
2013	Annie Award for Music in a Feature Production	Secret of the Wings	Nominated
2015	International Film Music Critics Award for Best Original Score for a Comedy Film	A Million Ways to Die in the West	Nominated
