= Television film =

Feature film produced for a TV network

A television film is a film with a running time similar to a feature film that is produced and originally distributed by or to a terrestrial or cable television broadcaster. It is in contrast to theatrical films first shown in movie theaters, direct-to-video films released only in home video formats and films released on or produced for streaming platforms.

In certain cases, a television film may also be shown, and referred to, as a miniseries, which typically indicates that it has been divided into multiple parts or a series that contains a predetermined, limited number of episodes.

== Origins and history ==
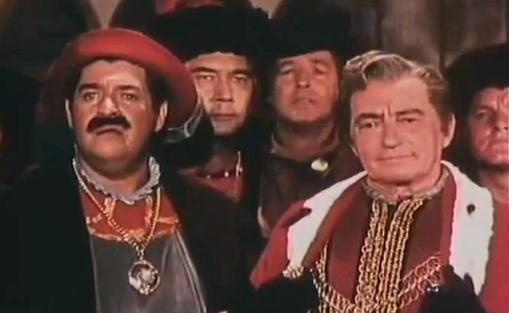
Stanley Adams (left) and Claude Rains in the television musical The Pied Piper of Hamelin, 1957

Precursors of "television movies" include Talk Faster, Mister, which aired on WABD (now WNYW) in New York City on December 18, 1944, and was produced by RKO Pictures, and the 1957 The Pied Piper of Hamelin, based on the poem by Robert Browning, and starring Van Johnson, one of the first filmed "family musicals" made directly for television. That film was made in Technicolor, a first for television, which ordinarily used color processes originated by specific networks. Most "family musicals" of the time, such as Peter Pan, were not filmed but broadcast live and preserved on kinescope, a recording of a television program made by filming the picture from a video monitor – and the only (relatively inexpensive) method of recording a television program until the invention of videotape.

Many television networks were against film programming, fearing that it would loosen the network's arrangements with sponsors and affiliates by encouraging station managers to make independent deals with advertisers and film producers.

Conversely, beginning in the 1950s episodes of American television series would be placed together and released as feature films in overseas cinemas.

Television networks were in control of the most valuable prime time slots available for programming, so syndicators of independent television films had to settle for fewer television markets and less desirable time periods. This meant much smaller advertising revenues and license fees compared with network-supplied programming.

The term "made-for-TV movie" was coined in the United States in the early 1960s as an incentive for movie audiences to stay home and watch what was promoted as the equivalent of a first-run theatrical film. Beginning in 1961 with NBC Saturday Night at the Movies, a prime time network showing of a television premiere of a major theatrical film release, the other networks soon copied the format, with each of the networks having several [Day of the Week] Night at the Movies showcases which led to a shortage of movie studio product. The first of these made-for-TV movies is generally acknowledged to be See How They Run, which debuted on NBC on October 7, 1964. A previous film, The Killers, starring Lee Marvin and Ronald Reagan, was filmed as a TV-movie, although NBC decided it was too violent for television and it was released theatrically instead.

The second film to be considered a television movie, Don Siegel's The Hanged Man, was broadcast by NBC on November 18, 1964.

These features originally filled a 90-minute programming time slot (including commercials), later expanded to two hours, and were usually broadcast as a weekly anthology television series (for example, the ABC Movie of the Week). Many early television movies featured major stars, and some were accorded higher budgets than standard television series of the same length, including the major dramatic anthology programs which they came to replace.

In 1996, 264 made-for-TV movies were made by five of the six largest American television networks at the time (ABC, CBS, NBC, Fox, and the WB), averaging a 7.5 rating. By 2000, only 146 TV movies were made by those five networks, averaging a 5.4 rating, while the number of made-for-cable movies made annually in the U.S. had doubled between 1990 and 2000.

In several respects, television films resemble B movies, the low-budget films issued by major studios from the 1930s through the 1950s for short-term showings in movie theaters, usually as a double bill alongside a major studio release. Like made-for-TV movies, B movies were designed as a disposable product, had low production costs and featured second-tier actors.

== Examples ==
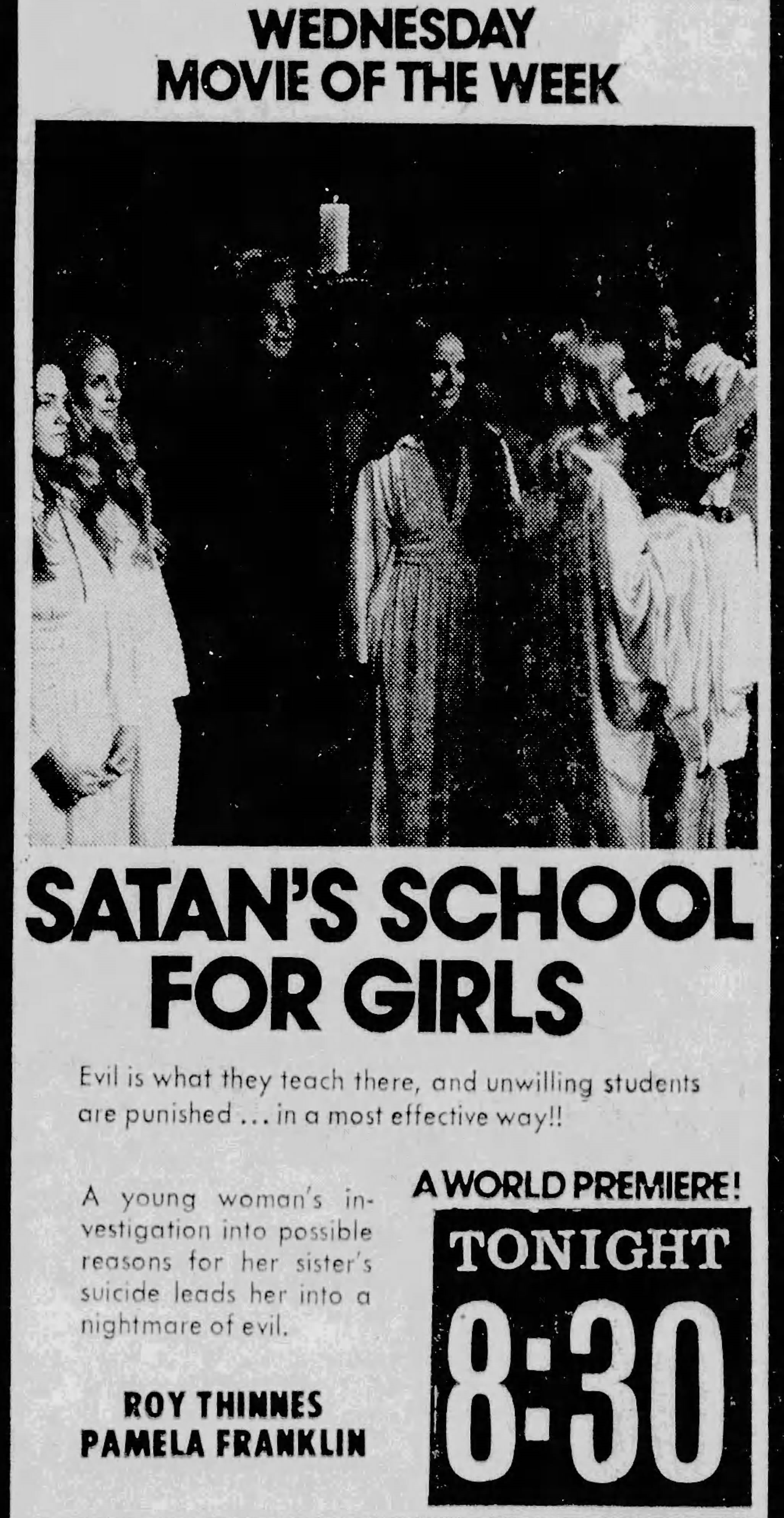
Advertisement for Satan's School for Girls, September 19, 1973

ABC's Battlestar Galactica: Saga of a Star World premiered to an audience of over 60 million people on September 17, 1978.

The most-watched television movie of all time was ABC's The Day After, which premiered on November 20, 1983, to an estimated audience of 100 million people. The film depicted America after a nuclear war with the Soviet Union, and was the subject of much controversy and discussion at the time of its release due to its graphic nature and subject matter. The BBC's 1984 television film Threads earned a similar reputation in the United Kingdom as it followed two families and workers of Sheffield City Council in the run up and aftermath of a nuclear war. The two are often compared on aspects such as realism.

Another popular and critically acclaimed television movie was 1971's Duel, written by Richard Matheson, directed by Steven Spielberg and starring Dennis Weaver. Such was the quality and popularity of Duel that it was released to cinemas in Europe and Australia, and had a limited theatrical release to some venues in the United States and Canada. The 1971 made-for-TV movie Brian's Song was also briefly released to theatres after its success on television, and was even remade in 2001. In some instances, television movies of the period had more explicit content included in the versions prepared to be exhibited theatrically in Europe. Examples of this include The Legend of Lizzie Borden, Helter Skelter, Prince of Bel Air and Spectre.

Many television movies released in the 1970s were a source of controversy, such as Linda Blair's 1974 film Born Innocent and 1975's Sarah T. – Portrait of a Teenage Alcoholic, as well as 1976's Dawn: Portrait of a Teenage Runaway and its 1977 sequel, Alexander: The Other Side of Dawn, which were vehicles for former Brady Bunch actress Eve Plumb. Another significant film was Elizabeth Montgomery's portrayal of a rape victim in the drama A Case of Rape (1974). Another source of criticism directly against the government was Nonoy Marcelo, who urges the Marcoses to release his 1978 animated film Tadhana theatrically instead of being premiered at television.

My Sweet Charlie (1970) with Patty Duke and Al Freeman Jr. dealt with racial prejudice, and That Certain Summer (1972), starring Hal Holbrook and Martin Sheen, although controversial, was considered the first television movie to approach the subject of homosexuality in a non-threatening manner. If These Walls Could Talk, a film which deals with abortion in three different decades (the 1950s, the 1970s and the 1990s) became a huge success, and was HBO's highest rated film on record.

If a network orders a two-hour television pilot for a proposed show, it will usually broadcast it as a television movie to recoup some of the costs even if the network chooses to not order the show to series. Often a successful series may spawn a television movie sequel after ending its run. For example, Babylon 5: The Gathering launched the science fiction series Babylon 5 and is considered to be distinct from the show's regular run of one-hour episodes. Babylon 5 also has several made-for-TV movie sequels set within the same fictional continuity. The 2003 remake of Battlestar Galactica began as a two-part miniseries that later continued as a weekly television program. Another example is the Showtime movie Sabrina, the Teenage Witch, which launched the sitcom of the same name that originally aired on ABC, and used the same actress (Melissa Joan Hart) for the lead role in both. The term "TV movie" is also frequently used as vehicles for "reunions" of long-departed series, as in Return to Mayberry and A Very Brady Christmas. They can also be a spin-off from a TV series including The Incredible Hulk Returns, The Trial of the Incredible Hulk and The Death of the Incredible Hulk.

Occasionally, television movies are used as sequels to successful theatrical films. For example, only the first film in The Parent Trap series was released theatrically. The Parent Trap II, III and Hawaiian Honeymoon were produced for television, and similarly, the Midnight Run sequels have all been released as made-for-TV movies despite the first having a strong run in theaters. These types of films may be, and more commonly are, released direct-to-video; there have been some films, such as The Dukes of Hazzard: The Beginning (a prequel to the film version of The Dukes of Hazzard) and James A. Michener's Texas, which have been released near simultaneously on DVD and on television, but have never been released in theatres.

Made for TV movie musicals have also become popular. One prime example is the High School Musical series, which aired its first two films on the Disney Channel. The first television movie was so successful that a sequel was produced, High School Musical 2, that debuted in August 2007 to 17.2 million viewers (this made it the highest-rated non-sports program in the history of basic cable and the highest-rated made-for-cable movie premiere on record). Due to the popularity of the first two films, the second HSM sequel, High School Musical 3: Senior Year, was released as a theatrical film in 2008 instead of airing on Disney Channel; High School Musical 3 became one of the highest-grossing movie musicals.

Television movies traditionally were often broadcast by the major networks during sweeps season. Such offerings now are very rare; as Ken Tucker noted while reviewing the Jesse Stone CBS television movies, "broadcast networks aren't investing in made-for-TV movies anymore". The slack has been taken up by cable networks such as Hallmark Channel, Syfy, Lifetime and HBO, with productions such as Temple Grandin and Recount, often utilizing top creative talent.

High-calibre limited programming which would have been formerly scheduled solely as a two-hour film or miniseries also has been re-adapted to the newer "limited series" format over a period of weeks (rather than the consecutive days usually defined by a miniseries) where a conclusion is assured; an example of such would be The People v. O. J. Simpson: American Crime Story, and these are most often seen on cable networks and streaming services such as Netflix.

== Production and quality ==
In a 1991 New York Times article, television critic John J. O'Connor wrote that "few artifacts of popular culture invite more condescension than the made-for-television movie". Network-made television movies in the United States have tended to be inexpensively-produced and perceived to be of low quality. Stylistically, these films often resemble single episodes of dramatic television series. Often, television films are made to "cash in" on the interest centering on stories currently prominent in the news, as the films based on the "Long Island Lolita" scandal involving Joey Buttafuoco and Amy Fisher were in 1993.

The stories are written to reach periodic semi-cliffhangers coinciding with the network-scheduled times for the insertion of commercials, and are further managed to fill, but not exceed, the fixed running times allotted by the network to each movie "series". In the case of films made for cable channels, they may rely on common, repetitive tropes (Hallmark Channel, for example, is notorious for its formulaic holiday romances, while Lifetime movies are well known for their common use of damsel in distress storylines). The movies tend to rely on smaller casts, one such exception being those produced for premium cable, such as Behind the Candelabra (which featured established film actors Michael Douglas and Matt Damon in the lead roles) and a limited range of scene settings and camera setups. Even Spielberg's Duel, while having decent production values, features a very small cast (apart from Dennis Weaver, all other actors appearing in the film play smaller roles) and mostly outdoor shooting locations in the desert.

The movies typically employ smaller crews, and rarely feature expensive special effects. Although a film's expenses would be lessened by filming using video, as the movies were contracted by television studios, these films were required to be shot on 35 mm film. Various techniques are often employed to "pad" television movies with low budgets and underdeveloped scripts, such as music video-style montages, flashbacks, or repeated footage, and extended periods of dramatic slow motion footage. However, the less expensive digital 24p video format has made some quality improvements on the television movie market.

Part of the reason for the lower budgets comes from the lack of revenue streams from them; whereas a theatrical film can make money from ticket sales, ancillary markets, and syndication, most television films lacked those revenue streams, and the films are seldom rerun. Raconteur Jean Shepherd produced several television films in the 1970s and 1980s before realizing that the proceeds from his first theatrical film, A Christmas Story (released in 1983), far exceeded anything he had ever done in television.

Nonetheless, notable exceptions exist of high production quality and well-known casts and crews that even earned awards, such as The Diamond Fleece, a 1992 Canadian TV film directed by Al Waxman and starring Ben Cross, Kate Nelligan and Brian Dennehy. It earned Nelligan the 1993 Gemini Award for "Best Performance by an Actress in a Leading Role in a Dramatic Program or Mini-Series".

== Movie-length episodes of television shows ==
Occasionally, a long running television series is used as the basis for television movies that air during the show's run, as opposed to the above mentioned "reunion specials". Typically, such movies employ a filmed single camera setup even if the television series is videotaped using a multiple camera setup, but are written to be easily broken up into individual 30- or 60-minute episodes for syndication. Many such movies relocate the cast of the show to an exotic overseas setting. However, although they may be advertised as movies, they are really simply extended episodes of television shows, such as the pilots and the finales of Star Trek: The Next Generation, Star Trek: Deep Space Nine and Star Trek: Voyager. Most of these are made and shown during sweeps period in order to attract a large television audience and boost viewership for a show.

Crossover episodes containing a number of episodes of the characters of individual series interacting with characters across different shows (as has been done with the CSI, NCIS and Chicago franchises, along with between Murder, She Wrote and Magnum, P.I., Scandal and How to Get Away with Murder, and Ally McBeal and The Practice) also play as films, encouraging tune-in among all the series crossed over to effectively create a multiple-hour plot that plays as a film when watched as a whole.

== See also ==
- Direct to video
- Film adaptation
- List of television films produced for American Broadcasting Company
- Miniseries
- Soap opera
- Telenovela
- Téléroman
- Television play
- Television pilot
- Television show
- Television special

== Bibliography ==
- Marill, Alvin H. Movies Made for Television, 1964–2004. Lanham, Md.: Scarecrow Press, 2005. ISBN 0-8108-5174-1. (Vol. 1: 1964–1979; Vol. 2: 1980–1989; Vol. 3: 1990–1999; Vol. 4: 2000–2004; Vol. 5: Indexes.)
- Marill, Alvin H. Movies Made for Television, 2005–2009. Lanham, Md.: Scarecrow Press, 2010. ISBN 0-8108-7658-2.
- Marill, Alvin H. Big Pictures on the Small Screen: Made-for-TV Movies and Anthology Dramas. Westport, Conn.: Praeger Publishers, 2007. ISBN 0-275-99283-7
