= Carrie Kei Heim =

Former American child actress and writer

Carrie Heim Binas
- Born: Carrie Kei Heim; December 7, 1973 (age 52); Tokyo, Japan
- Occupations: Actress, Lawyer, Writer
- Years active: 1982–1986
- Spouse: Peter Binas (m. 2005)
- Website: linkedin.com/in/carrie-kei-heim-7451401b

Carrie Kei Heim (born December 7, 1973) is an American lawyer, writer, and former child actress. She is best known for her roles as Cornelia in Santa Claus: The Movie (1985) and Nikki Ferris in The Parent Trap II (1986). After completing The Parent Trap ll, Heim retired from acting.

== Biography ==
Heim is the daughter of Janie and Michael Heim of Manhattan.

Heim is a 1991 graduate of Hunter College High School, a 1994 graduate of Vassar College with an A.B. in French, and a 1996 graduate of Hunter College with an additional B.A. in English and Theater. In 2001, Heim received a J.D. from the University of Pennsylvania law school and was a lawyer until 2008 when she retired to focus on her newborn daughter. Carrie then went on to pursue a career in writing.

Heim has worked as a clerk for Jeffrey R. Howard of the United States Court of Appeals for the First Circuit and as a litigation associate for the law firms Cravath, Swaine & Moore and Mintz Levin.

Heim is now a novelist, and is currently represented by Jessica Faust at BookEnds Literary Agency.

On May 21, 2005, Heim married Peter K. Binas, son of Marina and George Binas of Whitestone at Annunciation Greek Orthodox Church (Manhattan), and currently has one child, a daughter Katherine, born April 12, 2007.

== Filmography ==
Carrie Kei Heim film and television credits
Year	Title	Role	Notes
1983	The Brass Ring	Diane	TV movie
1983	Sessions	Millie	TV movie
1985	The Equalizer	Sarah	Episode: "The Equalizer" (Pilot)
1985	Pippi Longstocking	Pippi Longstocking	ABC Weekend Special film
1985	Santa Claus: The Movie	Cornelia	Film
1986	Spenser: For Hire	Marcella Harrington	Episode: "At the River's Edge"
1986	The Parent Trap II	Nikki Ferris	TV movie
