= Bridgette Andersen =

American actress (1975–1997)

- Born: Bridget Marriah Andersen; July 11, 1975; Inglewood, California, US
- Died: May 18, 1997 (aged 21); Los Angeles, California, US
- Occupations: Actress; model
- Years active: Late 1970s – 1987

Bridget Marriah Andersen (July 11, 1975 – May 18, 1997) was an American child actress and child model who starred in 1982's Savannah Smiles, for which she received her first of four Youth in Film Award nominations.

== Personal life ==
Born on July 11, 1975 to Frank and Teresa Andersen, Bridgette lived in Malibu, California with her parents, younger sister Angelica and two brothers. As an infant, Angelica appeared in television advertisements for Bank of America and Mervyn's. A reader since age two-and-a-half, the Havre Daily News reported that six-year-old Andersen had "a staggering IQ." Her favorite author was Ernest Hemingway and her favorite book was The Old Man and the Sea. A fan of the television series Diff'rent Strokes and Silver Spoons, she decided to pursue acting and aspired to produce and direct films as well.

== Career ==
During a February 1983 interview with Johnny Carson on his late-night show, Andersen related a family anecdote of her trying to climb into the television and play with Our Gang ("The Little Rascals") at age two. Caught by her father, Frank, she was taught about actors and acting, whereafter she secured a talent agent and began acting. She spent three years fashion modeling and acting in television advertisements. She also appeared in television shows including King's Crossing and Washington Mistress. In 1982, Andersen starred as Savannah Driscoll in the film Savannah Smiles. Writer and co-star Mark Miller was inspired by (and wrote the part for) his daughter, Savannah. However, when the film began production, Savannah was too old for the part at age 11, so Mark auditioned almost 150 children before discovering and choosing Andersen for the part. In a contemporary interview, Andersen opined that she and the Driscoll character were "like twins! We do the same things." According to The Cumberland Times, only three months after the release of Savannah Smiles, Miller was already writing another script to star Andersen. That same year, Andersen portrayed the six-year-old Mae West in the biographical television film, Mae West. In 1983, Andersen explained that she preferred working in films versus television because they gave her more to do. During the 1983-1984 run of The Mississippi, Anderson was nominated for a Youth in Film Award ("Best Young Actress-Guest in a Television Series") for her work thereon. Andersen went on to star in the short-lived CBS sitcom, Gun Shy; she portrayed Celia, one of two children won in a card game by Barry Van Dyke's character, Russell Donovan.

=== Credits ===
Film performances
Year	Title	Role	Citation(s)
1982	Savannah Smiles	Savannah Driscoll	
1983	Nightmares	Brooke Houston	
1985	A Summer to Remember	Jill	
1985	Fever Pitch	Amy Taggart	
1987	Too Much	Susie	

Television performances
Year	Title	Role	Episode(s)	Citation(s)
1982	Washington Mistress	Jenny Reynolds		
1982	King's Crossing			
1982	Mae West	Mae West (age six)	Television film	
1983	Gun Shy	Celia	Six episodes	
1983	Faerie Tale Theatre	Gretel	"Hansel and Gretel"	
1984	The Return of Marcus Welby, M.D.	Alison Lattimer	Television film	
1984	Remington Steele	Angel	"Blood Is Thicker Than Steele"	
1986	The Golden Girls	Charley	"The Truth Will Out"	
1986	Between Two Women	Kate Petherton	Television film	
1986	The Parent Trap II	Mary Grand	Television film	
1987	CBS Summer Playhouse	Jamie Wilde	"Doctors Wilde"	

=== Awards nominations ===
Year(s)	Award	Category	Title of work	Result
1981-1982	4th Youth in Film Awards	Best Young Motion Picture Actress	Savannah Smiles	Nominated
1982-1983	5th Youth in Film Awards	Best Young Actress in a Comedy Series	Gun Shy	Nominated
1983-1984	6th Youth in Film Awards	Best Young Actress-Guest in a Television Series	The Mississippi	Nominated
1984-1985	7th Youth in Film Awards	Exceptional Performance by a Young Actress in a Television Special or Mini-Series	A Summer to Remember	Nominated

== Death and legacy ==
Andersen died of a heroin overdose in Los Angeles on May 18, 1997 at the age of 21. In 2015, actress Amber Tamblyn published her third book of poetry, Dark Sparkler, which features eulogies and poems dedicated to numerous deceased actors. Andersen is the subject of one such poem, as is pornographic film actor Shannon Michelle Wilsey (1970–1994), whose stage name "Savannah" was derived from her favorite film, Andersen's Savannah Smiles. Wilsey's poem is written as "a meta-poem, where she's writing for Andersen and telling her how they're the same." When MVD Entertainment Group published Savannah Smiles on DVD in 2018 as part of their MVD Rewind Collection, among the bonus materials included was "a featurette about the memories of Andersen."
