= William Young Boyd II =

American author

- Born: March 5, 1926; Panama City
- Died: December 21, 2014 (aged 88)
- Citizenship: American
- Education: Phillips Academy Andover, Yale University
- Occupations: Businessman, author, and philanthropist

William Young Boyd II (March 5, 1926 – December 21, 2014) was an American businessman, author, and philanthropist.

== Education and career ==
Boyd was born in Panama City, where his family was in shipping. He graduated from Phillips Academy Andover in 1944 and was drafted at eighteen into the U.S. Army during World War II where he saw combat as part of the Rainbow Division during the Battle of the Bulge and liberation of Dachau Concentration Camp. He was awarded a Purple Heart. Boyd was awarded the French Legion of Honor at the French Embassy in Panama.

Boyd attended Yale University, graduating in 1950. He returned to Panama and joined the firm of Boyd Brothers, Inc., becoming chairman of the board of its shipping, insurance, banking and importing companies, a company that has served the Panama Canal since 1909.

== Publications ==
Boyd published five novels, including three on World War II, under the name Bill Boyd.

- Boyd, Bill. 1998. Bolivar : Liberator of a Continent : A Dramatized Biography. 1st ed. New York: S.P.I. Books.
- Boyd, Bill. 2003. The Gentle Infantryman. [1st Elton-Wolf Pub. ed.]. [Seattle, Wash.]: [Elton-Wolf Pub.].
- Boyd, Bill. 2003. A Fight for Love & Glory. [1st Elton-Wolf Pub. ed.]. Seattle, Wash.: Elton-Wolf Pub.
- Boyd, Bill. 2003. A Rendezvous with Death. 1st ed. Seattle, Wash.: Elton-Wolf Pub.
- Boyd, Bill. 2004. Panama and the Canal, 1903–2003 : An Historical Novella. 2nd ed. Panama: Editora Sibauste.

== W. Y. Boyd Literary Award for Excellence in Military Fiction ==
In 1997 Boyd established the W. Y. Boyd Literary Award for Excellence in Military Fiction as an endowment to the American Library Association. It is for "the best fiction set in a period when the United States was at war" and "the service of American veterans and military personnel."

The inaugural award was to Jeff Shaara for Gods and Generals in 1997. Other authors honored include Howard Bahr, Donald McCaig, Edwin H. Simmons, Karl Marlantes, Ralph Peters, P. T. Deutermann and Tim Wendel.
