= Tim Wendel =

Tim Wendel may refer to:

- Tim Wendel (writer) (born 1956), American writer
- Tim Wendel (footballer) (born 1989), German footballer
