= P. T. Deutermann bibliography =

This P. T. Deutermann bibliography is a list of books written by P. T. Deutermann, except collections, ebooks, and non-novels.

== Complete list of works in chronological order ==
Note: + denotes a book in the Cam Richter series.

Title	Publisher	Year	Genre/Subject	Length (Pages)	Notes	ISBN
Scorpion in the Sea	St. Martin's Press	1992	Mystery	464p (1992 First edition); 582p (1994 Second edition)	Also known as Scorpion in the Sea: The Goldsborough Incident.	0-312-95179-5
On a calm night off the Florida coast, a fishing boat vanishes without a trace. Something is hiding in U.S. waters and the Navy would rather bury the truth than face it. Unconventional and brash, Mike Montgomery, who is hardly regulation Navy, is in command of the USS Goldsborough, a WWII-era destroyer.
Edge of Honor	St. Martin's Press	1994	Suspense	626p	.	0-312-95396-8
At the height of the Vietnam War, Lt. Brian Holcomb begins a seven-month assignment on the USS John Bell Hood, a guided-missile ship off the coast of Vietnam. He is the weapons department head, in charge of the Hood's array of computer-controlled attack and defense systems. His wife, Maddy, waits nervously back in San Diego. An ambitious young officer, Holcomb is up for promotion. But he soon discovers that the Hood is riddled with problems that make it vulnerable to a potentially deadly air assault by the North Vietnamese - problems that the ship's enigmatic captain seems unable or unwilling to address. Brian must make a decision: Should he ignore the problems and endanger the ship, or do something about them and put his career in jeopardy? Meanwhile, Maddy Holcomb faces her own dilemma, for another man.
Official Privilege	St. Martin's Press	1995	Mystery	552p	.	0-312-95713-0
In the Philadelphia Naval Shipyard, the mummified body of a black Navy lieutenant is found bolted inside the boiler of a deactivated battleship. While the cause of death is clear, the officer's identity is not. With nerve raw from the media focus on recent scandals, the Pentagon bypasses its own investigative service and appoints a commander, Dan Collins, and a civilian, Grace Snow, to conduct an inquiry. Together they resolve to ignore the Navy's political sensitivities and conduct a by-the-book murder investigation. But then they uncover evidence that points back to Washington, D.C., and a two-year-old unsolved case involving another black Navy lieutenant, who died under violent circumstances. While they search for links between the two deaths, they attract the attention of one Malachi Ward. Cunning, ruthless, well paid, and ferociously resourceful, he will do whatever it takes to protect his hidden client's privilege.
Sweepers	St. Martin's Press	1997	Mystery	322p	Also known as Sweepers: A Novel of Suspense.	0-312-15669-3
In 1961, a Navy SEAL, is dropped off in the Vietnam jungle. Days later, a U.S. gunboat returns to pick him up, but the boat's young captain, Lt. William Sherman, panics under fire and leaves the SEAL behind. Twenty years later, Sherman is now a Pentagon admiral. When a woman is found dead in her home, and Admiral Sherman comes under suspicion, Navy Commander Karen Lawrence is assigned to conduct her own inquiry. With the help of a seasoned investigator and ex-Marine, "Train" von Rensel, Karen finds herself confronting a Pentagon hierarchy determined to avoid scandal - even at the cost of the truth. The pressure builds when yet another friend of the admiral is found dead under mysterious circumstances, and it becomes apparent that the SEAL is back, as a sweeper, an intelligence specialist who cleans things up when covert operations go wrong. Only this time, he is on a mission of personal revenge.
Zero Option	St. Martin's Press	1999	Suspense	421p (1999 First edition)	.	0-312-97004-8
They call it "Wet Eye", a biological weapon that literally eats out the eyes of its victims. Now, deep within the belly of the U.S. military establishment, one small silver canister of Wet Eye is missing, lost because a career pencil-pusher has cut a million-dollar deal and signed it in blood. For David Stafford, a Defense Department investigator, finding the missing canister means ripping through layers of cover-ups, bureaucracy, and one man's murderous determination to sell it to an international arms dealer. But the military would rather silence Stafford than admit a security breach. And now, the only person who can stop a biological conflagration is an innocent child, who has looked into the face of evil, and seen it with her own two eyes.
Train Man	St. Martin's Press	1999	Suspense	354p (1999 First edition); 458p (2001 Second edition)	.	0-312-20375-6
One night, a bridge is destroyed, thunderously plunging a 100-car train into the Mississippi River. In D.C., the FBI scrambles--sending Assistant Director Hush Hanson and agent Carolyn Lang to investigate. Hanson is a team player and killer marksman, Lang has an agenda of her own and by the time the two agents leave D.C. they are on a collision course with each other, and a second bridge has exploded. While the investigation is exploding into an inter-agency feud. The brass is after a terrorist cell, while Hanson and Lang suspect a single man is bringing down the bridges one by one, and a top-secret, emergency shipment of unstable nuclear waste has been sent west by train. And when the nukes meet the river there will be no way across, no time to turn back, and almost no chance to stop the deadliest disaster of all.
Hunting Season	St. Martin's Press	2001	Suspense	352p (2001 First edition); 528p (2002 Second edition)	.	0-312-26979-X
Edwin Kreiss a retired "sweeper" who spent years making rogue operatives disappear, finds himself back on the job -- unofficially -- when his daughter vanishes in the woods of rural West Virginia. Using his old skills of tracking, hunting, high-tech and low-tech intelligence work, and whatever else he has, he mounts his own search and investigation. He is suddenly thrown into conflict with people from his past and a female FBI agent determined to crack the case first, he becomes targeted for retrieval by one of his own kind, as he cuts a path through political scandal, personal revenge, and high-level corruption.
Darkside	St. Martin's Press	2002	Mystery	352p (2002 Illustrated edition); 544p (2002 Non-illustrated edition)	.	0-312-98636-X
A midshipman's six-story fall onto a plaza at the U.S Naval Academy is initially ruled an accident. The Academy's administration, referred to as the "Dark Side" by the midshipmen, attempts to brush the ensuing controversy under the rug. But a twist complicates what might otherwise be a tidy cover-up, and pulls Midshipman first class Julie Markham into the incident in a highly embarrassing manner. Suddenly there are rumors of homicide. Her flawless reputation, high academic standing, and athletic achievements make her an unlikely suspect, but her father, Ev Markham, an Annapolis graduate who is now a professor there, knows the extremes to which the "Dark Side" will go to protect the Academy from scandal. Fearing Julie will be sacrificed to appease the rising public outcry, he hires high-powered attorney Liz DeWinter as NCIS begins to investigate. Meanwhile, Jim Hall, the Academy's civilian security officer, finds himself involved in a subterranean mystery of his own.
The Firefly	St. Martin's Press	2003	Suspense	352p (2003 Revised edition); 528p (2004 Second edition)	.	0-312-20377-2
According to the D.C. police, the fiery destruction of an upscale plastic surgery clinic and its staff is just business as usual. With the whole city on high alert because of the upcoming presidential inauguration, the Secret Service can afford to let it go. Retired agent Swamp Morgan pulls what appears to be a "firefly" case-until he digs deeper. The facts don't add up; a German man, the clinic's last client, has vanished. The only surviving nurse is almost killed, and a mysterious tape indicating an imminent threat against the government puts Morgan on full alert, but his bosses refuse to listen to his warnings. He's in a race against time as the deadly pieces fall into place. Fighting the odds, he's got to stop the brilliant plan to assassinate the incoming and outgoing presidents before America falls into total chaos...or die trying.
The Cat Dancers+	St. Martin's Press	2005	Suspense	341p (2005 First edition); 464p (2006 Second edition)	.	0-312-33377-3
When two lowlifes rob a gas station, kill the attendant, and then incinerate bystanders, the Manceford County, North Carolina, police arrest the killers at a nearby motel. But the judge throws out the case because the suspects were not read their rights, leaving Sheriff Bobby Lee Baggett and Lt. Cam Richter to face the victims’ families. Soon thereafter, an e-mail arrives to the department, in it, a link to a video of one of the killers being executed in a homemade electric chair, ending with a voice announcing, "That’s one." The video spreads across the internet, drawing the attention of local, state, and federal authorities and national media, and putting pressure on the two cops to find the vigilante before he claims his second victim. Assigned to head the search, Cam finds himself resented by some of his fellow officers and threatened by others. His job is further complicated by the fact that the judge is his ex-wife. His questions lead him to a remote mountain area in western North Carolina and a group of daredevils who call themselves "the cat dancers"-because they have tracked the last wild mountain lions in the area to their dens, where they have photographed the animals, or died trying. Cam must hunt this group and the cats they seek, or become their next target.
Spider Mountain+	St. Martin's Press	2006	Suspense	309p (2006 First edition); 416p (2008 Second edition)	.	0-312-33379-X
Called upon by a friend, ex-cop Cam Richter agrees to do a favor: investigate the assault of a young woman in a remote area of the Great Smoky Mountains National Park. He knows the hills and hollers of the park, and his outdoor skills might break a case that local cops can’t-or maybe don’t want to-solve. He has no idea how dangerous his search will become, because in this part of Appalachia, matriarch Grinny Creigh and her extended family get rid of those who intrude. The Creighs control the crystal meth trade and own just about everything and everyone in their neck of the woods. But they also operate an enterprise, a dark secret that terrifies any children unfortunate enough to come within their grasp. Blocked by a menacing sheriff with ties to the family, Cam is shut down and sent away, none-the-wiser about why the young woman was attacked or what she saw. He returns, stealthily stalking the Creighs and their secrets, moving ever closer to Grinny’s mountain house and what it might conceal, not knowing that he has been detected, and that the Creighs are hunting him with creatures bred for that purpose and starved into relentless fury.
The Moonpool+	St. Martin's Press	2008	Suspense	292p (2008 First edition); 368p (2009 Second edition)	Also known as Moonpool: A Novel by Rudy Von B Rucker & P. T. Deutermann.	0-312-37159-4
A private detective working in Wilmington, North Carolina, is found dead in a gas-station restroom, apparently poisoned. But when her body sets off radiation alarms in the pathologist’s office, suspicion falls on the nearby Helios nuclear power plant, a heavily guarded facility with "supposedly" failsafe security measures. As the FBI, local police, and the plant’s own security investigate, ex-cop Cam Richter, head of the agency that employed the dead woman, begins his own inquiries. He soon finds himself up against powerful forces that will stop at nothing to keep the plant’s problems secret. The most vulnerable part of the plant is its "moonpool"—the radioactive storage pond that cools spent, yet still volatile reactor fuel rods and must be kept full. Racing against time, Cam discovers an inside threat, which will use the plant’s own systems to begin an unstoppable, disastrous sequence of events.
Nightwalkers+	St. Martin's Press	2009	Suspense	320p (2009 First edition)	.	0-312-37241-8
Seeking a more peaceful life in Rockwell County, North Carolina, Ex-cop Cam Richter buys a rundown, 700-acre plantation called "Glory's End" and finds himself the target of a killer. As he tries to find out why someone wants him dead, Richter deals with all the problems of a home suddenly alive with secrets of its bloody past.
Pacific Glory	St. Martin's Press	2010	Historical	.	.	9780312599447
Historical novel about World War II.
