= The Black Flower =

Historical fiction novel by Howard Bahr

- First edition cover
- Author: Howard Bahr
- Publisher: Nautical & Aviation Publishing Company of Ame
- Publication date: April 1, 1997
- ISBN: 978-1-877853-50-0

The Black Flower is a 1997 historical fiction novel written by Howard Bahr. It received numerous accolades, including being named a New York Times Notable Book. Shelby Foote, author of The Civil War: A Narrative, recommends it highly. The Black Flower was nominated for a Stephen Crane Award for First Fiction, and won the W.Y. Boyd Literary Award for Excellence in Military Fiction in 1998.

The novel is about Private Bushrod Carter's experiences in the Battle of Franklin. It was published by Picador.

== Plot ==
The novel begins shortly before the Battle of Franklin in November 1864. Confederate soldier Bushrod Carter and his comrades Jack Bishop and Virgil C. Johnson prepare for battle. After the fighting, Bushrod is found wounded and is taken to a farmhouse being used as a field hospital.

There he meets Anna Hereford, who helps care for the wounded. Bushrod later searches the battlefield for his comrades and discovers that both have died. His own injuries subsequently become infected, and despite an amputation, he dies while Anna remains with him.

== Publication and reception ==
Kirkus Reviews described the novel as Bahr's debut and noted its focus on the experiences of soldiers and civilians during and after the Battle of Franklin.

Publishers Weekly reviewed the novel in March 1997 and noted its combination of historical detail with the experiences of characters caught in the aftermath of battle. The review also stated that the novel had been nominated for the Stephen Crane Award for First Fiction.

A later review by the Historical Novel Society described the book as closely researched and noted its attention to the historical setting of the Battle of Franklin and the experiences of ordinary soldiers.

In 1998, the novel received the W. Y. Boyd Literary Award for Excellence in Military Fiction from the American Library Association.
