= The Frozen Hours =

2017 novel by Jeff Shaara

- First edition
- Author: Jeff Shaara
- Language: English
- Genre: War historical fiction
- Publisher: Ballantine Books
- Publication date: May 23, 2017
- Publication place: United States
- Pages: 560
- ISBN: 978-0-345-54922-8

The Frozen Hours: A Novel of the Korean War is a 2017 historical war novel by American author Jeff Shaara, published by Ballantine Books. Set during the opening months of the Korean War, the novel centers on the Battle of Chosin Reservoir in late 1950, when Chinese forces surrounded elements of the United Nations Command in the mountains of North Korea and the encircled forces fought their way south under severe winter conditions.

Shaara presents the campaign principally through three viewpoints: Oliver P. Smith, commanding general of the U.S. 1st Marine Division; Marine Private First Class Pete Riley, a World War II veteran serving as a rifleman in the 7th Marines; and Chinese general Song Shilun, commander of the People's Volunteer Army forces assigned to destroy the United Nations forces around the reservoir. The shifting viewpoints allow the novel to portray the campaign at the command level, from the perspective of an infantryman in close combat, and from the Chinese side.

The Frozen Hours received the 2018 W. Y. Boyd Literary Award for Excellence in Military Fiction from the American Library Association and the 2018 James Webb Award for fiction from the Marine Corps Heritage Foundation.

== Publication ==
Ballantine Books published The Frozen Hours on May 23, 2017. The electronic edition was released the same day, as was an unabridged audiobook narrated by Paul Michael. A paperback edition followed on May 22, 2018. The novel entered the Publishers Weekly hardcover-fiction bestseller list at number nine.

== Historical background ==
The novel takes place during the dramatic reversal in the Korean War that followed the Battle of Inchon. North Korea had invaded South Korea in June 1950, but the Inchon landing in September and the subsequent recapture of Seoul transformed the military situation. United Nations forces advanced northward, and General Douglas MacArthur believed that the war might be brought to a rapid conclusion. X Corps, commanded by Major General Edward Almond, moved into northeastern Korea while the Eighth Army advanced farther west.

The advance brought United Nations troops close to the Yalu River and the border of the recently established People's Republic of China. Chinese forces began secretly crossing into North Korea in October. After initial clashes, they temporarily withdrew from contact, encouraging the United Nations advance before launching a much larger offensive in late November. On the eastern side of Korea, the offensive struck forces dispersed around the Chosin Reservoir and along the narrow mountain road leading south toward the coast.

The forces at and around Chosin included U.S. Marines and Army troops as well as South Korean and British personnel. They faced a substantially larger Chinese force and unusually severe winter conditions. The mountainous terrain, sub-zero temperatures and dependence on a single main supply route complicated both combat and logistics; frostbite and exposure became major causes of casualties alongside enemy action.

The Chinese offensive beginning on November 27 surrounded or isolated several United Nations positions. The 1st Marine Division subsequently conducted a fighting withdrawal southward through Hagaru-ri and Koto-ri. The breakout from the Chosin encirclement began on December 6, and the division reached the port area of Hungnam on December 11. The larger Hungnam evacuation continued until December 24; naval forces eventually evacuated approximately 105,000 military personnel and 91,000 Korean civilians, together with vehicles and supplies. These events form the historical arc of the latter part of Shaara's novel.

== Plot ==
The novel begins after the successful Inchon landing, when confidence among senior American commanders is high and the North Korean army appears close to defeat. MacArthur directs the United Nations advance farther north. Smith's 1st Marine Division comes under Almond's X Corps, whose headquarters repeatedly urges a rapid advance toward the Yalu. Smith, however, becomes increasingly uneasy about the lengthening supply line, the mountainous terrain and indications that substantial Chinese forces may already have entered Korea.

Parallel chapters follow Song Shilun and the Chinese forces moving south from the border. Song seeks to exploit the dispersal of the United Nations formations while limiting his troops' exposure to American aircraft and artillery. The Chinese movement is conducted largely at night, allowing a large force to establish positions in the mountains around the reservoir before launching its attack.

At the infantry level, the story follows Pete Riley, a Marine in Fox Company of the 7th Marines. Riley's position on what becomes known as Fox Hill, commanding the Toktong Pass between Yudam-ni and Hagaru-ri, becomes one of the principal settings of the novel. Beginning on November 27, Fox Company withstands repeated attacks while attempting to keep the road open. Through Riley and the men around him, the novel depicts close combat as well as hunger, exhaustion, frostbite, frozen weapons, frozen food and the difficulty of simply remaining alive in the extreme cold.

The command-level narrative follows Smith as the Chinese offensive turns the planned northward advance into a struggle to preserve the division. The scattered Marine positions must be concentrated and the force moved south along a road overlooked by Chinese-held heights. Shaara contrasts Smith's efforts to conserve his force and maintain communications with the confidence and pressure for rapid movement associated in the novel with MacArthur and Almond.

The Chinese chapters follow the same struggle from Song's position. His numerical strength is counterbalanced by severe logistical problems, exposure to American air power and artillery, inadequate winter equipment, and heavy casualties from both combat and the weather. As the Marines withdraw south, the novel follows the attempts of Song's forces to prevent their escape and the enormous physical cost imposed on both armies.

The final stages follow the fighting withdrawal through Hagaru-ri and Koto-ri toward Hungnam. Rather than presenting the withdrawal simply as defeat, the novel emphasizes the survival of an encircled force that retains its organization while bringing its wounded and much of its equipment out of the mountains.

== Narrative approach and themes ==
As in Shaara's other historical novels, The Frozen Hours combines documented events and historical figures with imagined dialogue, private thoughts and scenes intended to place the reader inside the participants' experiences. Ron Capps of The American Interest described Shaara's method as imagining the conversations and perceptions of historical participants while adding fictional characters where required. He considered the novel successful both as storytelling and as historical reconstruction.

The three principal viewpoints operate at different levels of the campaign. Smith provides the perspective of a senior commander responsible for an entire division; Riley gives the experience of the infantryman; and Song provides the viewpoint of the opposing commander. Booklist noted that this movement between commanders and soldiers allows Shaara to show the difference between planning a military campaign and experiencing its consequences on the ground.

Leadership is consequently a major theme. Smith is portrayed as cautious about the advance and increasingly skeptical of higher headquarters, while MacArthur and Almond embody the confidence that followed the victories at Inchon and Seoul. Capps interpreted this contrast as part of the novel's examination of courage, leadership and integrity, but also of hubris, racism and the human costs produced by strategic misjudgment.

The physical environment functions almost as another antagonist. Capps described the cold as arguably the novel's dominant presence beyond its human characters. Weapons and food freeze, frostbite disables soldiers, the wounded are difficult to evacuate, and Chinese troops suffer heavily from inadequate clothing and shelter. The novel therefore presents Chosin not only as a contest between two armies but as a struggle by both against the environment.

The Chinese viewpoint distinguishes the novel from an exclusively American account of the campaign. Song is depicted as an experienced commander conscious of American advantages in aircraft, artillery and logistics and operating under pressure from Mao Zedong. A review in the historical journal Saber and Scroll praised the use of the Chinese perspective for giving a human face to the opposing army and for showing that Chinese soldiers suffered from the cold and the campaign's conditions as severely as their adversaries.

Capps nevertheless identified an important limitation in the narrative: although the war is fought in Korea, Shaara concentrates overwhelmingly on American and Chinese participants, leaving both North and South Koreans largely outside the novel's narrative perspective. He argued that this absence also reflects the degree to which the major outside powers themselves marginalized Koreans during the conflict.

== Reception ==
Dan Forrest, reviewing the novel for Library Journal, praised Shaara's handling of the large cast and wrote that the strategies, tactics and order of battle were presented clearly and accurately. He considered the novel likely to appeal both to readers of Shaara's previous work and to readers interested in military history.

Jeff Westerhoff of the Historical Novel Society described the book as well researched and emphasized Shaara's success in combining the larger campaign with the experiences of individual servicemen. He highlighted the depiction of the extreme cold and the battle sequences and regarded the inclusion of the Chinese command perspective as part of the novel's ambitious scope.

Writing in The American Interest, Capps judged the novel both a successful story and a historically accurate work of military fiction. He emphasized its treatment of Smith, Riley and Song, its representation of the cold, and its exploration of leadership and strategic failure, while criticizing the effective disappearance of Korean perspectives from a story about the Korean War.

In 2018, the American Library Association selected The Frozen Hours for its W. Y. Boyd Literary Award for Excellence in Military Fiction, which recognizes fiction set during periods in which the United States was at war. The award jury described the novel as an important work of historical fiction that helps preserve the memory of the Korean War and the service of those who fought in it. The same year, the Marine Corps Heritage Foundation awarded Shaara the James Webb Award, given for distinguished fiction concerning the U.S. Marines or Marine Corps life.

== See also ==
- Battle of Chosin Reservoir
- Hungnam evacuation
- 1st Marine Division
- Song Shilun
