= The War in 2020 =

Book by Ralph Peters

- First edition
- Author: Ralph Peters
- Language: English
- Genre: War, adventure
- Publisher: Pocket Books
- Publication date: February 1991
- Publication place: United States
- Media type: Print (Hardback & Paperback)
- Pages: 434 pp (Hardback)
- ISBN: 0-671-67670-9 (Hardback); ISBN 0-671-75172-7 (Paperback)
- OCLC: 22347519
- Dewey Decimal: 813/.54 20
- LC Class: PS3566.E7559 W37 1991

The War in 2020 is a 1991 war-adventure novel written by Ralph Peters. Taking place in a future dystopia, the novel's plot is spread over 15 years and mostly features the United States' efforts to defend the Soviet Union against an alliance of Japan, South Africa, and the Arab Islamic Union, a confederation of militant Islamic states. The novel follows the career of U.S. Army air cavalry officer George Taylor as he leads his troopers in wars abroad and civil conflict at home.

== Background ==
During the 1990s, intense trade competition gradually makes Japan a major trading power against the United States and the European Union. The Japanese also use their position to strengthen their military technology and influence around the world.

The U.S. military draws down its forces for most of the 1990s, after Operation Desert Shield and a series of intervention against drug cartels in Latin America. Its military intelligence community moves to automate intelligence-gathering.

The situation comes to a head in 2005 when South Africa, armed and supported by Japan, invades and occupies Zaire's mineral-rich Shaba. The United States sends the XVIII Airborne Corps along with associated air and naval assets to repel the aggression.

=== Plot ===
During the Shaba conflict, Captain George Taylor of the U.S. Army leads an Apache gunship squadron that is attacked and destroyed by South African gunships. After crashing and mercy-killing his fatally wounded gunner, he finds an abandoned Army camp, and forages supplies for a long trek, initially on foot, to the Zairean capital, Kinshasa. Along the way he learns that the attack on his squadron was part of a bigger South African offensive that had targeted U.S. forces in Zaire; South African commandos and Zairean guerrillas allied with the South Africans also destroy B-2 bombers at an airbase in Kinshasa.

The American collapse was so swift that the U.S. President is only able to force a cease-fire (and South African withdrawal) by carrying out a nuclear strike on Pretoria, an action that had reaped heavy international condemnation.

Taylor is evacuated home to a base in the Azores, but finds himself suffering from "Runciman's Disease" (RD), a virus that leaves his face horribly scarred. Many returning U.S. soldiers are similarly infected, and it quickly spreads around the worldwide in a global pandemic.

Politically, the intervention is a disaster for America - the E.U. abandons its support for the intervention, and Japan uses the war as an excuse to launch a mercantilist trade war against America: it embargoes countries that continue to trade with the U.S.A. In the Middle East, taking advantage of America's postwar weakness, an alliance of Islamic nations wages a nuclear war, destroying Israel and forcing many of its citizens to flee to the USA. As a result of the nuclear conflicts, a treaty among nuclear powers agreeing to nuclear disarmament is ratified, including the USSR, the US, and other nations.

In 2008, Taylor leads a U.S. Army unit into Los Angeles, to put down pandemic-related social unrest. Several years later, Taylor deploys with U.S. forces to Mexico, to eradicate a Japanese-supported rebellion; his disfigured face, and unique tactics, strike fear among the rebels.

In 2020, the Soviet Union is on the brink of internal collapse, as its Central Asian republics revolt against Moscow's rule, aided and armed by Japan and South Africa. The United States reorganizes its military, and secretly deploys a combat unit — the 7th Heavy Cavalry Regiment (7HCR) — under by-then Colonel Taylor's command, spearheaded by the new M-100 assault gunship (which are equipped with an advanced railgun and Gatling cannons).

The U.S. military command orders the open deployment of the 7HCR to strike a blow deep into the heart of the Arab Islamic Union lines in northern Kazakhstan. The initial U.S. attacks on November 2, 2020, render heavy damage to the Islamic Union and their allied Iranian forces. Taylor's troops reposition to new deployment areas in the Ural river region, but a stray radio transmission gives the Japanese a clue to the location of an assembly area near Orsk. The Japanese attack using "Scramblers," a special radiowave weapon that permanently disrupts the body's neuro-muscular functions while leaving the brain intact.

After the Scrambler attack, the American government, orders Taylor to cease offensive operations. Taylor defies the order, avoids a Soviet trap, and launch an attack on the Japanese headquarters in Baku, which is under siege from Azeri militants. Taylor's troops storms the facility and kills Kabata, while a U.S. technician uses the center's advanced supercomputer to disable Japan's space defenses and other in-theater assets. Japanese relief columns arrive at the base and Taylor dies staying behind to shut down the computer, while the rest of his men fly to Turkey.

The epilogue shows that the attack led to a peace treaty signed between the USSR and its enemies. The 7HCR is commended by presidential order, with all survivors promoted.

== Characters ==
=== Americans ===
- Col. George Taylor

The novel's lead character. Taylor is a highly successful helicopter pilot who reads classical literature. He is known for humming the classic Irish air "Garryowen" and keeps a special cavalry guidon streamer by his person. The disfiguration of Taylor's face as a result of being infected with Runciman's Disease later reaps him the moniker "El Diablo" during the Mexico operation. Taylor's leadership of the 7HCR and his stand in Baku later reaps him a posthumous Medal of Honor and a special exhibit at the Cavalry Museum in Fort Riley, Kansas.

- Lt Col. Thomas Reno

The 7HCR's deputy commander, Reno is seen as an attention-seeking officer who has reporters following him. His propensity to talk over the radio, despite orders of radio silence, leads the Japanese to an assembly area where the Scramblers are eventually deployed. Reno, who comes from a military family, is promoted to colonel and given command of the 7th.

- Lt. Col. Howard 'Merry' Meredith

One of the very few US Army officers not be affected by RD, Meredith entered the service over his parents' objections. He and Taylor being work together during the Los Angeles deployment in 2008. The reorganization of the 7HCR makes him uncomfortable and he transfers to Fort Huachuca to run the Army intelligence training school.

- Maj. Manuel Xavier "Manny" Martinez

A Mexican-American from a tough background in San Antonio, Martinez serves in the 7HCR as Taylor's senior maintenance officer. He personally attends to the regiment's machines but dies in an enemy bombing of the city of Omsk while finishing repairs to an M-100.

- Jonathan Waters

The United States' first African-American president, Waters supports the US effort in the USSR and approves Taylor's attack plan for Baku against his Cabinet's opposition. However, he later dies of a heart attack in his sleep.

- Clifton Bouquette.

The director of the Unified Intelligence Agency (the successor to the United States Intelligence Community), Bouquette seeks out sexual relationships outside his marriage, leading to his divorce on Christmas Day in 2020. He also opposes Taylor's war strategy and downplays his success.

- Daisy Fitzgerald

A UIA analyst who loves Colonel Taylor, Daisy is concerned about him not coming back from Russia. She does not attend Taylor's memorial service and later sleeps with Bouquette.

=== Japanese ===
- Noburu Kabata

The commander of all Japanese forces in Soviet Central Asia, Kabata previously served in Zaire and was part of an evacuation crew for Israelis after the Jewish state is destroyed in a nuclear war. A man with a taste for fine living, Kabata is an avid golf player and prefers bespoke suits.

=== Soviets ===
- Colonel Viktor Kozlov

A former GRU officer assigned as the 7HCR's Soviet Army liaison, Kozlov is often mocked for his broken teeth and bad breath. He later provides Taylor with information on Japan's Baku headquarters, remembering the layout from his service with the Soviet Army occupation forces years earlier.

- Major Yuri Babryshkin

A Soviet tank brigade commander assigned to the Kokchetav front, Babryshkin is appalled at a chemical warfare attack on nearby civilians. The KGB executes him for supposed treason.

- Valya Babryshkina

Yuri's wife, Valya is a prostitute making the rounds in Moscow. She is devastated by her husband's execution but gets over it when she meets an American warrant officer who later proposes to her.

== Critical reception ==
Kirkus Reviews lauded the book for its gripping writing and material that's easy for non-military readers to understand.

Publishers Weekly criticized Peters' portrayal of Muslim troops as savages, but praised the book for showing the "grim nature" of military life.
