= USS Tattnall (DDG-19) =

Charles F. Adams-class destroyer

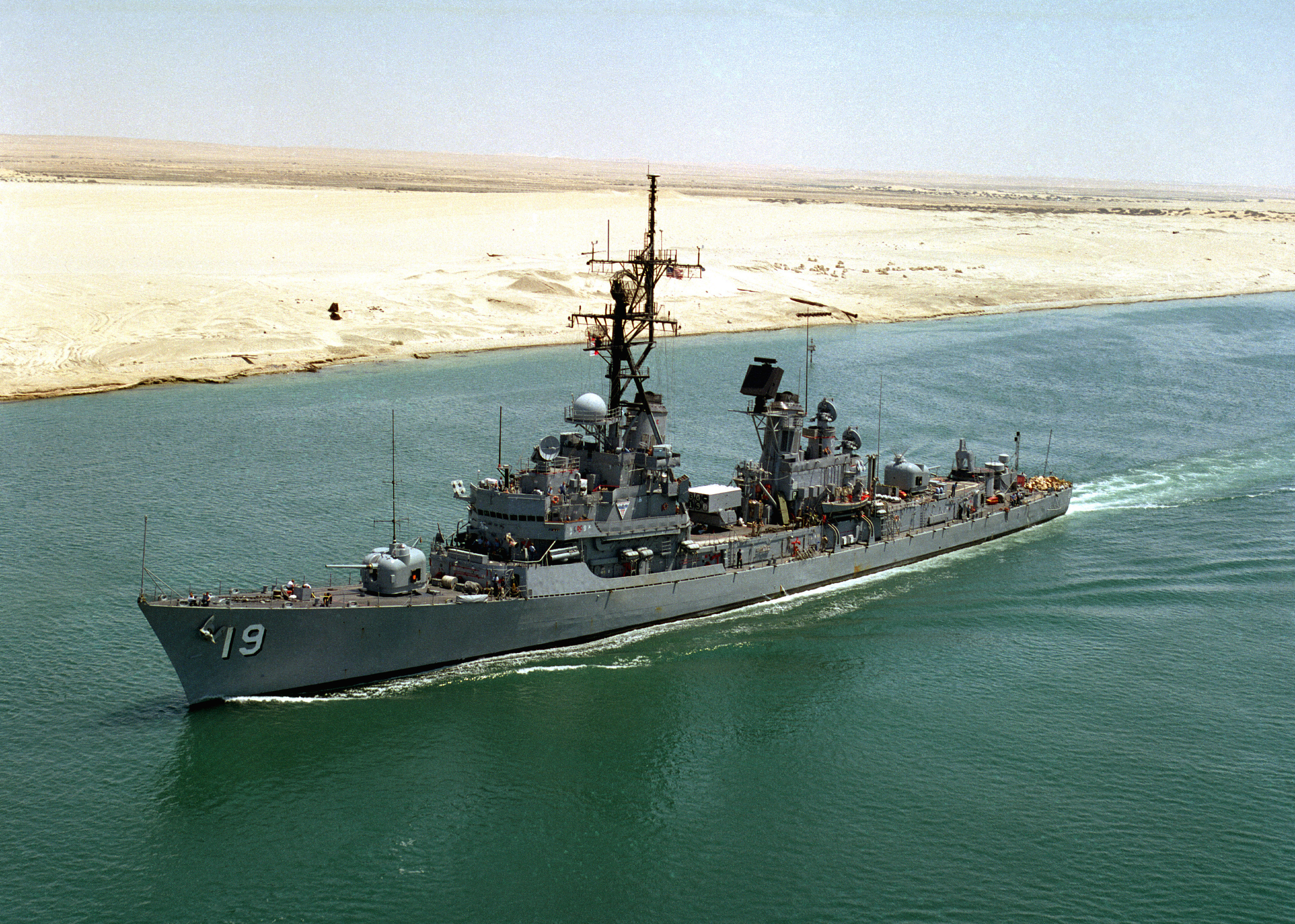
- USS Tattnall transits the Suez Canal in August 1990

History

United States
- Name: Tattnall
- Namesake: Josiah Tattnall III
- Ordered: 21 July 1959
- Builder: Avondale Marine
- Laid down: 14 November 1960
- Launched: 26 August 1961
- Commissioned: 13 April 1963
- Decommissioned: 18 January 1991
- Stricken: 12 January 1993
- Identification: Callsign: NIBD; Hull number: DDG-19
- Motto: Je Me Souviendrai; (I Will Remember)
- Fate: Scrapped, 10 February 1999
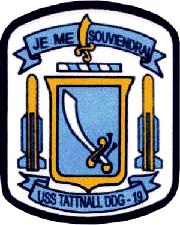
- Badge

General characteristics
- Class & type: Charles F. Adams-class destroyer
- Displacement: 3,277 tons standard, 4,526 full load
- Length: 437 ft (133 m)
- Beam: 47 ft (14 m)
- Draft: 15 ft (4.6 m)
- Propulsion: 2 × General Electric steam turbines providing 70,000 shp (52 MW); 2 shafts; 4 × Combustion Engineering 1,275 psi (8,790 kPa) boilers
- Speed: 33 knots (61 km/h; 38 mph)
- Range: 4,500 nautical miles (8,300 km) at 20 knots (37 km/h)
- Complement: 354 (24 officers, 330 enlisted)
- Sensors & processing systems: AN/SPS-39 3D air search radar; AN/SPS-10 surface search radar; AN/SPG-51 missile fire control radar; AN/SPG-53 gunfire control radar; AN/SQS-23 Sonar and the hull mounted SQQ-23 Pair Sonar for DDG-2 through 19; AN/SPS-40 Air Search Radar; AN/SPQ-9 (post upgrade)
- Electronic warfare & decoys: AN/SLQ-32
- Armament: 1 Mk 11 missile launcher (DDG2-14) or Mk 13 single arm missile launcher (DDG-15-24) for RIM-24 Tartar SAM system, or later the RIM-66 Standard (SM-1) and Harpoon antiship missile; 2 × 5"/54 caliber Mark 42 (127 mm) gun; 1 × RUR-5 ASROC Launcher; 6 × 12.8 in (324 mm) ASW Torpedo Tubes (2 x Mark 32 Surface Vessel Torpedo Tubes); Harpoon missile (post upgrade)

USS Tattnall (DDG-19) was a Charles F. Adams-class guided missile-armed destroyer of the United States Navy. She was named for Commodore Josiah Tattnall III USN (1794–1871) – also commandant of the CSS Virginia, and an admiral in the Confederate States Navy – who made the adage "blood is thicker than water" a part of American history.

Tattnall was laid down by Avondale Marine at Avondale, Louisiana on 14 November 1960, launched on 26 August 1961 by Mrs. Mary Adams Mason and commissioned on 13 April 1963 at Charleston, S.C.

== 1960s ==
Following commissioning, Tattnall conducted sea trials out of Charleston and tested her Tartar and RUR-5 ASROC missile systems in the Charleston, Jacksonville, FL, and San Juan, Puerto Rico, operating areas. Late in August, she returned to Charleston before departing again for shakedown training in the West Indies. The guided-missile destroyer returned to Charleston once again on 20 October for post-shakedown availability. Training, exercises, and local operations followed from early February until late April 1964. After a visit to New York City late in April, she resumed operations out of Charleston.

On 8 September, she got underway for her first overseas cruise during which she participated in NATO Exercise "Teamwork," an operation conducted in the Norwegian Sea and in the Bay of Biscay. The exercise ended early in October, and the warship put into Portsmouth, England, on the 3rd. Tattnall moved from there to Edinburgh, Scotland, for a two- or three-day visit in October, before heading back to the United States. On the 22nd, she reentered Charleston and resumed normal operations.

Following missile firings and gunnery practice in the San Juan operating area, Tattnall departed the western Atlantic on 7 December for her first deployment to the Mediterranean Sea. On 14 December, she reached the Straits of Gibraltar and became a unit of the 6th Fleet. While in the Mediterranean, she visited Tunis, Tunisia in northern Africa; Genoa, and Naples in Italy; Marseille and Théoule-sur-Mer in France; and Barcelona in Spain. She also participated in several exercises with other units of the 6th Fleet and with ships of foreign navies. On 4 March 1965, she retransited the Straits of Gibraltar and headed back toward the United States.

The guided-missile destroyer made Charleston on 14 March and began an availability period in preparation for her participation in projects for the Chief of Naval Operations. She completed the availability on 19 April and put to sea to conduct Fleet Research Project Number 69. She finished her work on the research project on 7 May and returned to Charleston. Tattnall resumed normal operations until 30 August when she put to sea to conduct the first of two additional tasks for the Chief of Naval Operations. This project, designated D/S 336, sought to insure her combat readiness prior to the second project, 0/S 102. During project D/S 336, Tattnall's crew averaged 10 to 12 hours a day at general quarters as they tracked single and multiple-plane air raids and simulated missile firings. Weather conditions hampered the gathering of data so that project D/S 336 was not concluded until 2 October. She put to sea again on 4 October for project O/S 102, a multi-phase test of the combat effectiveness of the Charles F. Adams-class guided-missile destroyer. She completed the project early in December and returned to Charleston for availability, holiday leave, and preparation for another Mediterranean deployment.

On 15 February 1966, Tattnall departed Charleston once more to join the 6th Fleet. From 27 February to 3 March, she participated in Exercise "Fairgame IV," a Franco-American exercise conducted in the western Mediterranean. On 17 May, she conducted an intelligence surveillance of Russian warships. In June, she joined in another western Mediterranean exercise, "Deep Six." On this cruise, she added Rhodes, Majorca, Thessalonica and Volas, Greece, and Istanbul, Turkey, to her list of ports visited. On 1 July, the warship put to sea from Palma de Majorca and headed back toward Charleston, where she arrived on 22 August.

Upon arrival, Tattnall immediately began her first major overhaul since commissioning. She remained in Charleston Naval Shipyard from 22 August 1966 until 7 March 1967. After exiting the shipyard, she resumed local operations along the southern Atlantic coast of the United States and in the West Indies until early July. Following a week-long visit to New York City from 12 to 19 July, the guided-missile destroyer returned to Charleston to prepare for her third Mediterranean cruise. That deployment lasted through January 1968; and, by early February, Tattnall was back in Charleston. She resumed normal operations along the southeastern coast of the United States and in the West Indies until June, when she returned to Europe. After a stop in the Azores and a visit to Germany for the "Kiel Week" celebration, Tattnall reentered the Mediterranean for another tour of duty with the 6th Fleet. The warship remained in the Mediterranean until mid-November and then returned to the east coast and local operations.

Tattnall continued to operate from Charleston until late July 1969, when she shifted home ports to Mayport, Fla. She arrived in Mayport on 29 July and conducted normal operations until September. From 2 to 24 September, the guided-missile destroyer participated in NATO Operation "Peacekeeper." On the 24th, she entered Amsterdam in the Netherlands for a week, then put to sea for hunter-killer operations and visits to the European ports of Hamburg, Bergen, Edinburgh, and Le Havre. She reentered Mayport on 10 December 1969.

== 1970s ==
After four months operating out of Mayport, Tattnall steamed north to Chesapeake Bay, where she assisted in tests conducted at Randle Cliffs, Md., by scientists of the Naval Research Laboratory. She visited Newport, R.I., in mid-month and returned to Mayport on the 25th. Following five months of operations and exercises in the vicinity of Mayport, Tattnall steamed to Charleston for her second regular overhaul. She remained in Charleston Naval Shipyard until 24 March 1971, when she began post-overhaul trials. On 22 April, she headed back to Mayport and operations in the Caribbean Sea and the Gulf of Mexico.

On 16 September 1971, the ship departed Charleston bound for northern Europe and Exercise "Royal Knight." During that cruise, she visited Rosyth, Scotland, and Rotterdam in the Netherlands before returning to Mayport on 22 October.

In March 1972, Tattnall deployed to the Mediterranean once again. She conducted exercises with other units of the 6th Fleet and with ships of foreign navies. The guided-missile destroyer visited Valencia, Spain, Genoa and Naples in Italy, Patras and Athens in Greece, Kusadasi and Iskenderun in Turkey, Sousse, Tunisia, Menton, France, Palma de Majorca, Spain, and Sicily. On 28 August, she changed operational control to the 2nd Fleet and headed for Mayport, where she arrived on 5 September.

Tattnall resumed operations from Mayport until 29 May 1973, when she got underway to participate in a joint American-French exercise conducted in the vicinity of Charleston. In late May and early June, she visited Norfolk, Va., and the Naval Academy at Annapolis, Md. She returned to Mayport on 18 June. After a month in the Mayport area, Tattnall embarked upon her first UNITAS deployment to South America. She visited ports in Brazil, Colombia, Peru, Argentina, and Uruguay in between operations and exercises conducted with units of those countries' navies. On 15 December, she returned to Mayport and resumed exercises in the western Atlantic and upkeep in her home port through July 1974.

On 22 July 1974, she began a two-month restricted availability at Charleston. The Tattnall returned to Mayport on 21 September to begin preparations for another Mediterranean deployment. The guided-missile destroyer departed Mayport on 25 November and changed operational control to the 6th Fleet at Rota, Spain, on 5 December. Tattnall participated in "special operations" on 9 December following a brief stop at Gaeta, Italy, she put into Barcelona for the holidays on 18 December.

On 6 January 1975, the warship sailed to Rapallo, Italy for an 8-day goodwill visit with local leaders followed by a brief stop in La Spezia to meet with senior Italian Navy officials. Tattnall enjoyed a tender availability while in Naples (18 January – 23 February), paused briefly to refuel at Augusta Bay, Sicily, then sailed to Sousse, Tunisia for another visit with local officials on 26 January. A storm in the Gulf of Hammemet forced her to sea on 27 January, but the warship promptly resumed her visit until her departure on 4 March, Tattnall sailed to Souda Bay, Crete (6–7 March) where the guided-missile destroyer successfully completed two of three missile firings. Following a routine visit to Palermo, Sicily (9–14 March), she participated in exercises with the Forrest Sherman (DD-931) en route to join Carrier Task Group 60.2 for operations simulating an opposed passage of the Strait of Messina. After a routine visit to Palma (19 March – 5 April), Tattnall and other units of TG 60.2 joined Sturgeon (SSN-637) for ASW exercises en route to a training anchorage in Pollensa Bay, Majorca (6–9 April). The guided-missile destroyer refueled from Neosho (AO-143) while sailing to Barcelona (10–18 April) where she embarked Rear Admiral Nicholson, Commander, Carrier Striking Group Two for meetings with high ranking Spanish military and civilian dignitaries. Tattnall sailed to Sardinia on the 19th with units of TG 60.2 where she participated briefly in the amphibious exercise "Sardinia 75" on the 20th followed by naval gunfire exercises the next two days. Departing Sardinia, the guided-missile destroyer rendezvoused with Gato (SSN-615) and the Italian Navy destroyer Intrepido (D571) for ASW exercises. Tattnall successfully completed an Operational Readiness Examination and conducted exercises prior to passing through the Strait of Gibraltar en route to Rota, Spain (26 April-2 May). On the 5th, the Tattnall joined Leahy (DLG/CG-16) in Portsmouth, England to sail to Leningrad (12–17 May) in the Soviet Union for a visit in honor of the 30th anniversary of the Allied victory in Europe during World War II. The warships interrupted their return passage to Portsmouth, England (23–25 May) for fuel and debriefing with a two-day sojourn in Kiel Germany. Tattnall returned to Mayport on 6 June after brief stops in the Azores and Bermuda.

She remained in Mayport until sailing to Newport, Rhode Island on 6 August for three weeks of training midshipmen. Upon return to Mayport on the 29th, she prepared to shift her homeport to Philadelphia for the upcoming regular overhaul. Two days after her arrival in Philadelphia on 4 October 1975, the warship commenced the overhaul that included numerous modifications to her weapons, communication, and engineering equipment. With the overhaul completed as scheduled on 6 August 1976, Tattnall returned to Mayport on the 12th in advance of post-overhaul refresher training. She tested weapon systems in Port Everglades during the last week of August then returned to Mayport for further inspections and tests. On 20 September, a Cleveland television station news crew embarked to film for a documentary news program on life in the Navy. Tattnall tested the performance of her missile systems at Roosevelt Roads, Puerto Rico then sailed to Guantanamo Bay for refresher training (8 October – 10 November). The guided-missile destroyer returned to Puerto Rico for naval gunfire support qualification prior to her return to her home port of Mayport on 20 November. She received a tender availability alongside Yosemite (AD-19) and Christmas standdown.

Following participation in the major fleet exercise "Caribex 2–77", from 29 January to 10 February 1977, Tattnall departed on a seven-month deployment with the 6th Fleet in the Mediterranean on 30 March. She returned to Mayport on 21 October.

Tattnall began 1978 as part of the 2nd Fleet "Ready Alert Group" and twice interrupted her holiday leave period on 4 and 7 January to get underway on less than 24 hours notice. During the second of these sorties, she rendezvoused with Dwight D. Eisenhower (CVN-69) off Puerto Rico on the 10th. Tattnall conducted an underway replenishment alongside the carrier before returning to Mayport a week later. In February, the warship participated in readiness exercises in the Caribbean. During her passage south, she served as flagship for Commander Destroyer Squadron (DESRON) 14 and also enjoyed a port visit to Martinique (14–21 February). The guided-missile destroyer returned to Mayport at the beginning of March to prepare for her upcoming deployment to the North Atlantic. On 1 April, Tattnall transferred to DESRON 12 and then sailed to Fort Lauderdale for first week of the month for a Chief of Naval Operations project on mine warfare. The warship preparations for deployment included a propulsion examination, naval gunfire support qualification, and highly successful supply management inspection. On 11 June, she completed sea trials and departed Mayport the next day for a deployment with the Standing Naval Forces, Atlantic (SNFL).

Following refueling stops at Bermuda and the Azores, Tattnall relieved Pharris (FF-1094) on 23 June 1978 at the Dutch Naval Base at Den Helder, Netherlands. By the end of August, Tattnall visited Rosyth (30 June – 4 July and 14–17 July), Rothesay (13–19 August), and Glasgow (12–22 August) in Scotland; Tromso (21–24 July) and Haakonsvern Naval Base, Bergen (31 July – 6 August) in Norway; and Zeebrugge (26 August – 1 September). On 1 September, the warship, along with other SNFL units, provided screening and gunfire support to amphibious units in the Shetland Islands and Jutland as part of the NATO exercise "Northern Wedding". Tattnall continued her screening duties after a gale forced many of the ships in the exercise to sea before she detached to refuel at Den Helder on the 16th. The exercise ended when the guided-missile destroyer rejoined the amphibious force off Scotland the next day and put into Portsmouth, England on the 19th Engineering problems delayed her departure until 14 October when she rejoined SNFL forces anti-aircraft exercises off western Scotland. Tattnall visited Rotterdam, Netherlands (20–26 October); Aarhus (2–5 November) and Copenhagen (10–14 November) in Denmark; Kiel, Germany (18–21 November); and Lisbon, Portugal (2–5 December) before she arrived back at her homeport on 16 December for holiday leave and upkeep.

Tattnall received a visit from the Navy Inspector General when the holiday standdown drew to a close on 19 January 1979. An availability (22 January – 15 February) alongside Yosemite (AD-19) followed and after successful completion of inspections, the warship got underway on the 16th to join Independence (CV-62) for a week of exercises hampered by bad weather off Jacksonville and the Virginia Capes. The guided-missile destroyer completed her Navy Technical Proficiency Inspection (12–13 March) in between two stints as an Engineering Training School Ship (26 February – 8 March and 26 March to 6 April). On 8 April, members of Tattnall's Rescue and Assistance Detail helped bring a fire that caused significant damage under control in Manley (DD-940) while the pair berthed in Mayport. On 30 April, she entered drydock in Jacksonville Shipyards for painting and minor repairs and returned to Mayport on 12 May ahead of a Command Inspection (21–22 May). On 22 June, over two hundred of the crew's family enjoyed a dependents cruise. On 9 July, Tattnall set sail from Mayport for midshipman training in Norfolk from 13 to 26 July. Upon return to Mayport, she provided support to the Senior Officers Ship Maintenance and Repair course and conducted a training availability with Fleet Training Center Mayport (6–10 August). On 20 August, the guided-missile destroyer joined Composite Training Unit Exercise (COMPTUEX) 3–79 during which she fired her surface-to-air, surface-to-surface missiles and successfully launched an anti-submarine rocket (ASROC), and a Mark 46 torpedo. She returned to Mayport on the 27th to prepare for an upcoming inspection, but Hurricane David forced the warship to sea on 2 September. Following satisfactory completion of the material inspection, Tattnall set sail from Mayport on 1 October for Puerto Rico. During two-weeks of exercises there, which included naval gunfire support qualification at Vieques Island, she served as flagship for DESRON 26.

On 29 October, Tattnall began preparations for her deployment to the Middle East, but the context of her deployment changed considerably after a group of militant university students took over the American diplomatic mission in Tehran on 4 November 1979, thus precipitating the Iranian Hostage Crisis that would last until 20 January 1981. Following a combat system review and inspections, the warship conducted sea trials (19–20 November) during which the ship played host to a troop of Mayport-area Boy Scouts and two participants in the Secretary of the Navy's Guest Cruise Program. As Tattnall completed her long days of preparation for her 27 November departure from Mayport, the ship learned that she had earned six Battle Efficiency Awards for the previous year. During the passage across the Atlantic, the warship fired three missiles during exercises and conducted a "blue water" turnover with Mahan (DDG-42) near the Azores. After reaching Rota, Spain on 9 December, Tattnall joined Forrestal (CV-59) and Task Group 60.2 for MULTIPLEX 1–80 (14–20 December) then sailed to Genoa, Italy for holiday leave and upkeep.

== 1980s ==
After departing Genoa on 4 January 1980, the guided-missile destroyer conducted training and an underway replenishment as she sailed south for a port visit to Bari, Italy (9–14 January) in advance of a task group missile exercise at Souda Bay, Crete on the 16th. Tattnall remained at a training anchorage in Crete until the 22nd when she got underway for a large battle group replenishment before sailing to Athens (25–31 January) for rest and relaxation. After passing through the Suez Canal on 3 February, the guided-missile destroyer relieved Claude V. Ricketts (DDG-5) and joined Koelsch (FF-1049) for the passage around the Arabian peninsula. Tattnall stopped briefly at Djibouti (7 February) for fuel and replenishment before reaching the Persian Gulf on the 13th. In the Persian Gulf, the guided-missile destroyer remained at sea to defend the Middle East Force flagship La Salle (AGF-3) and conduct surveillance operations in the Persian Gulf and the Strait of Hormuz. She briefly visited Bahrain (15–17 March) (double check deg log) before pointing homeward. Tattnall squeezed a two-day goodwill visit to Berbera, Somalia between stops for fuel in Djibouti (22 and 29 March) prior to transiting the Suez Canal on 3 April. The warship enjoyed a repair availability in Naples (7–22 April), sailed through the Strait of Gibraltar on the 25th and passed a propulsion plant examination while in Rota, Spain (25–27 April). With Commander DESRON 24 embarked and in the company of the Forrestal Battle Group, the guided-missile destroyer reached Mayport on 7 May. The crew enjoyed a post-deployment leave period and the ship underwent an intermediate maintenance availability with Yosemite (AD-19) upon return to homeport.

On 2 July, with only fourteen hours notice, Tattnall got underway as DESRON 24 flagship of a quick reaction task group that included Koelsch, Truett (FF-1095), and Manitowoc (LST-1180). The task group conducted type training in the waters off Key West until the 8th. Upon return to Mayport on the 11th, the ship's crew prepared for the annual Nuclear Technical Proficiency Inspection which she passed with outstanding grades in six of seven areas evaluated. After a dependent's cruise (7 August), the warship departed Mayport for a goodwill cruise of Latin American under operational control of Combined Joint Task Force Commander, Key West. She refueled at Guatanamo Bay (18 August) before calling on Veracruz, Mexico (23–26 August) and Puerto Cortes, Honduras (30–31 August). The guided-missile destroyer suffered substantial damage from an electrical fire in the after engine room upon her departure from Honduras, but this did not deter her from earning the top score for her class of ship in naval gunfire support qualification at Vieques (7 September). After a brief return to Mayport (11–16 September), Tattnall visited Port Everglades (19–21 September) en route to the Atlantic Underwater Test and Evaluation Center (AUTEC) in the Bahamas (23–25 September) for anti-submarine warfare (ASW) exercises. Upon her return to Mayport on the 26th, the guided-missile destroyer remained in port, except for type training off Jacksonville (22 October), to concentrate on training and preparations for an upcoming deployment and overhaul. After completion of sea trials (24–26 November), she set sail for Puerto Rican waters on 1 December to participate in gunfire and missile exercises. The warship returned to homeport on the 13th for holiday leave and final preparations for deployment.

In 1981, the Tattnall was taken over by Captain P. T. Deutermann who served as captain for a three-year tour of duty. On 12 January 1981, Tattnall joined Blakely a day after setting sail from Mayport for a passage across the Atlantic plagued by high winds and rough seas. The pair refueled at Bermuda and Rota, then navigated the Strait of Gibraltar on the 24th. Tattnall arrived at Port Said, Egypt on the 30th where she embarked Vice Admiral Small, Commander Sixth Fleet for the transit of the Suez Canal the following day. After a stop for fuel in Djibouti (3 February), she joined Task Group 70.9 in the Indian Ocean. Her crew marked the crossing of the equator on the 11th with the traditional rites and rituals. Then the warship put into Diego Garcia (12–14 February) for a tender availability alongside Jason (AR-8). She rejoined Task Group 70.9 for three days of exercises in the Indian Ocean before heading north to link up with the Independence (CV-62) Battle Group on the 18th for a week-long exercise from which the destroyer briefly took leave to unsuccessfully search for survivors of a mid-air collision between two Navy aircraft. Upon conclusion of exercise "Gonzo 1–81", Tattnall continued operations with Independence until the 27th when she departed for the Persian Gulf to relieve Jonas Ingram (DD-938) and Barney (DDG-6). Assigned to Middle East Force until 18 May, Tattnall punctuated her patrol of the Persian Gulf with numerous visits to Bahrain and a port visit to Damman, Saudi Arabia (13–14 May). After Bigelow (DD-942) relieved her, the warship again joined Blakely for the long passage back to Mayport. On the 26th, Tattnall struck an uncharted object as the ship completed her transit of the Suez Canal and suffered damage to the starboard propeller. She put into Malaga, Spain (1–6 June) where divers from Edenton (ATS-1) repaired the damage and the warship passed through the Straits of Gibraltar on 7 June. Tattnall refueled in the Azores and Bermuda, then returned to Mayport on the 18th for a month of upkeep.

On 20 July 1981, Tattnall got underway for the ten-day NATO fleet exercise "Ocean Venture" that included large battle group exercises and an opportunity for the guided-missile destroyer to utilize her various weapon systems. After removal of weapons at Charleston, South Carolina (31 July – 4 August), the ship returned to Mayport on 7 August to prepare for a 15-month overhaul. When Tattnall departed her homeport on the 26th, the Mk 68 Gun Fire Control System, the MK 32 Surface Vessel Torpedo Tubes, the ASROC launcher, SPG-51 missile fire control radar, the WLR-1 over-the-horizon threat detection radar, and the ULQ-6B electronic countermeasures system had all been removed. Upon arrival in Philadelphia, the warship received a warm welcome from city leaders and hosted 15,000 visitors on 29 and 30 August before she arrived in the Philadelphia Naval Shipyard on the last day of the month. On 9 September, Tattnall moved into dry dock and the crew moved to barracks ship APL-54 for the duration of an overhaul the included installation of the Harpoon anti-ship missile system and the Naval Tactical Data System (NTDS).

After completion of her sea trials, Tattnall set sail from Philadelphia Naval Shipyard one day ahead of her scheduled 28 November 1982 departure date. She returned to Mayport on 3 December where she began planning and preparation for refresher training. In early April 1983, she tested her weapons systems during trials in Port Everglades and her ASW systems at the AUTEC range in the Bahamas. The guided-missile destroyer conducted missile qualification training at Roosevelt Roads, Puerto Rico and naval gunfire support qualification at Vieques en route to refresher training at Guantanamo. Due to engineering problems Tattnall returned to Mayport for two weeks of boiler repairs then returned to Cuba in late June to complete her training. She returned to Mayport in mid-July to prepare for her upcoming deployment.

Following a dependents cruise on 23 September 1983, the warship departed Mayport for the Mediterranean Sea on the 29th. Tattnall visited Recife and Salvador, Brazil then joined John F. Kennedy battle group for the passage across the Atlantic. The guided-missile destroyers original schedule called for two months in the Indian Ocean following operations in the Mediterranean, however, resurgent violence in Lebanon between Christian and Druze militia followed by the killing of 241 U.S. Marines in the suicide bombing of the Marine barracks in Beirut on 23 October prompted a high-speed transit to the eastern Mediterranean after she changed to 6th Fleet control on the 28th. For the two and half months after her arrival off Beirut on 3 November, Tattnall supported the U.S. Multinational Force, occasionally putting in at Haifa, Israel for repairs, rest, and replenishment. On 13, 18, and 19 December, the warship fire her 5-inch guns on Syrian anti-aircraft positions and claimed the destruction of her two assigned targets on the 13th. On 24 January 1984, a fire erupted that required the assistance of Claude V. Ricketts (DDG-5), patrolling nearby. Tattnall lost all anti-aircraft capability and was handicapped in her ability to fire Harpoon missiles, and so set sail for Naples, Italy to assess the damage. Afterwards the guided-missile destroyer steamed home for extensive repairs, arriving in Mayport on 24 February.

Though she devoted most of her time to repair of fire damage and scheduled repairs to the engineering plant, Tattnall did manage to get underway for training from 4–7 June and host the Federal Republic of Germany (West German) destroyer Mölders (D186) in August. In October, an unforeseen problem with one of her main engines kept her pierside for a month while General Electric technical representatives and the ship's crew made repairs. Following a sea trial in November, Tattnall loaded weapons at the Naval Weapons Station Charleston and returned to Mayport until February 1985 for a limited availability for boiler maintenance, to test her combat systems, and conduct major engineering repairs.

She put to sea off Jacksonville the first two weeks of February 1985 to test her combat and fire control systems. An availability at Mayport for further maintenance and repair followed until 15 March when Tattnall departed for six weeks of refresher training at Guantanamo Bay. Shortly before leaving Guantanamo Bay, the guided-missile destroyer responded to a call for help from Coral Sea (CV-43) following her collision with an Ecuadoran tanker, but the aircraft carrier managed to get underway without assistance. In early May, Tattnall returned to Mayport for a brief maintenance availability prior to sailing to Mobile, Alabama to help celebrate the opening of the Tennessee-Tombigbee Waterway. Thousands of Mobile residents and tourists visited the ship during the early June event. Three weeks of combat system qualifications off Puerto Rico preceded a maintenance and repair availability in July. During this period, Tattnall hosted the frigate HMS Brilliant (F90). On 13 August, she sailed to Puerto Rico to participate in three weeks of fleet readiness exercises. In September, she returned to Mayport to prepare for her upcoming deployment to the Persian Gulf.

On 7 October 1985, Tattnall set sail in company with Conolly (DD-979), Gallery (FFG-26), and Boone (FFG-28). Following brief stops at Bermuda, Rota, and Palma de Majorca, the guided-missile destroyer transited the Suez Canal in late October. In the first week of November, Tattnall relieved Lynde McCormick (DDG-8) in the Persian Gulf and then entered Bahrain for upkeep, supplies and briefings. In the Persian Gulf, she operated on a radar patrol station in concert with Air Force E-3A AWACS based in Saudi Arabia until January. During that time, the warship also spent Christmas liberty in Al Jubayl, Saudi Arabia, made several port visits to Dubai, and conducted a "passing exercise" that test the guided-missile destroyer's ability to communicate with units of the Royal Saudi Navy.

On 24 January 1986, Tattnall sailed to the Gulf of Oman for escort operations then returned to the Persian Gulf for further surveillance operations in the first week of February. On 8 February, Tattnall visited Karachi, Pakistan for a brief port visit prior to conducting a "passing exercise" with units of the Pakistani Navy in the north Arabian Sea. The guided-missile cruiser conducted more surveillance operations in the Arabian Sea and Persian Gulf en route to Bahrain where the ship enjoyed a five-day port visit prior to moving to a training anchorage on the 22nd to practice engineering and damage control exercises. On 3 March, Tattnall departed Bahrain and continued surveillance operations in the Persian Gulf, Arabian Sea, and Red Sea until she transited the Suez Canal on the 17th. During that time, Luce (DDG-38) relieved her of duties with Middle East Force on the 7th in the western patrol area of the Gulf of Oman. Following six days of Mediterranean operations, the ship visited Barcelona (22nd–25th), Rota (26th) prior to reaching Mayport on 8 April.

After a four-week standdown, Tattnall devoted most of the remainder of the year to maintenance and upkeep. On 18 May, the warship embarked Commander, DESRON 12. She twice got underway in June for engineering training and on 8 July conducted three days of sea trials off Jacksonville. On 11 September, the ship held a dependent's cruise a day ahead of commencing an extended maintenance availability. On 18 December, the SPS-40 radar suffered damage when it rotated into span wire rigged for holiday lighting. Although a 23 December fast cruise concluded her availability, the need for a significant amount of work on her underwater hull led to the guided-missile destroyer being towed to Jacksonville Shipyard on 13 January 1987 for three months in drydock. On 9 April, Tattnall left drydock and entered Mayport under tow the following day. The ship occupied herself with inspections, sea trials, and a visit to Jacksonville as part of the "Say No to Drugs" program ahead of her 5 June departure for refresher training at Guatanamo Bay.

After a five weeks of training in West Indies waters (9 June – 16 July), she visited Bahamas for two days before returning to Mayport on 21 July 1987. Mobile Training Team from Commander, Naval Surface Force, U.S. Atlantic Fleet (ComNavSurfLant) arrived on the 27th and the ship completed a routine test and inspection the following month before getting underway for a fleet exercise on 21 August. Before the exercise concluded on 4 September, the warship had participated in a successful missile firing as well as naval gunfire support exercises off Puerto Rico. The guided-missile destroyer made a port Honduras (7–8 September) before she put into Mayport on the 13th for a maintenance availability. The ship conducted inspections and training, including an inspection by Commander, DESRON 12, before she completed her availability in early December. Following sea trials (7–11 December), the warship returned to Mayport for holiday leave and upkeep.

On 11 January 1988, Tattnall got underway with Luce for fleet exercises with a dual-carrier battle group in the Puerto Rican operations area. The guided-missile destroyer then returned to Mayport on the 26th to prepare for her Mediterranean deployment. On 29 February, Tattnall, in company with Luce and Vreeland (FF-1068), commenced a busy passage across the Atlantic. The warship conducted training with a carrier battle group until she detached with Dwight D. Eisenhower (CVN-69) to steam independently to the Mediterranean. After the pair transited the Strait of Gibraltar on 11 March, Tattnall relieved Claude V. Ricketts (DDG-5) on the evening of the 15th. In addition to battle group training and operations, she visited Palma de Majorca (18–25 March), Genoa, Italy (29 March – 5 April) and Villefranche, France (11–15 April) before the battle group moved to a training anchorage at Augusta Bay, Sicily (18–24 April). The warship visited Taranto, Italy (26–29 April) then refueled in Turkey on 1 May in advance of the NATO exercise "Dragon Hammer". After five days of upkeep in Sicily, Tattnall paused at Antalya Turkey (23–26 May) and Haifa (29 May – 3 June) prior to transiting the Dardanelles to Golcuk, Turkey (6–20 June). After two weeks of availability and upkeep, she got underway for the Black Sea, via the Bosporus, where a Soviet ship escorted her to Constanta, Romania (21–24 June). Tattnall briefly stopped at Antalya (28–30 June) before entering Haifa for a two-week visit interrupted by local exercises from 12 to 14 July. The ship visited Cannes (26 July – 1 August) and MacDonough (DDG-39) relieved Tattnall on 14 August during two weeks of upkeep at Gibraltar (4–18 August). The warship returned to Mayport on the 29th and began preparations for the upcoming Board of Inspection and Survey (INSURV).

After a fast cruise on the 28th, Tattnall visited Wilmington (30 September – 3 October) then sailed to Port Everglades for Navy Appreciation Week (7–15 October). The warship sailed to the Virginia Capes for tracking and live firing exercises on the 18th and 19th then returned to Mayport two days later. After the guided-missile destroyer received a satisfactory report from the INSURV conducted 14 to 18 November she conducted an intermediate availability on the 21st.

On 19 January 1989, Tattnall entered drydock for work on her boilers and painting her hull among other upkeep. After sea trials, an availability and a visit to Charleston to load weapons, she returned to Mayport on 19 May. On 19 June, the warship embarked Commander DESRON 12 for Type Commanders Core Training with other ships in the squadron. Following visits to Fort Lauderdale and Freeport, Bahamas she returned to Mayport for Independence Day festivities. On 19 July, Tattnall departed for refresher training at Guatanamo Bay. With a Coast Guard detachment embarked, the guided-missile destroyer interdicted a small Haitian sailing vessel with 150 refugees bound for United States. After the Coast Guard evacuated the passengers, Tattnall sank the vessel to eliminate a hazard to navigation. She visited Ocho Rios, Jamaica, and Roosevelt Roads, Puerto Rico before returning to Mayport. In early August, Tattnall participated in missile firing exercises off the Virginia Capes. On 29 August, the warship got underway for fleet exercises then returned to Mayport for an availability on 18 September. In October, the warships visited Fort Lauderdale and Tampa and she sailed to the AUTEC range for ASW training from 11 to 14 December.

== 1990s ==
On 21 January 1990, Tattnall got underway for three weeks of fleet exercises then returned to Mayport on 15 February to prepare for her overseas deployment. On 8 March, the warship departed Mayport and joined the Dwight D. Eisenhower battle group en route to the Mediterranean. On the 20th, she joined 6th Fleet and participated in "National Week" exercises before conducting turnover at Augusta Bay, Sicily. After enjoying an availability alongside Sierra (AD-18) in Naples until 17 April, the warship put into Trieste on the 19th to join vessels from several other NATO countries to form Naval on Call Forces Mediterranean (NAVOCFORMED). The warships conducted joint operations, including NATO operation "Dragon Hammer" as well as port visits to Cagliari, Barcelona, Marseille and Naples. The next couple of months included five French port visits, two visits to ports of call in Algeria, and one in Tunisia. In Algiers, Tattnall hosted a reception for diplomatic representatives from around the world. After another availability alongside Sierra, this time in Majorca, the warship visited Toulon (26 July – 1 August) then sailed to the eastern Mediterranean for Operation "Flashing Scimitar". After Iraq invaded Kuwait on 2 August, Tattnall transited the Suez Canal into the Red Sea in support of Desert Shield on 19 August, 1990.

=== Decommissioning and scrapping ===
Having been deployed in theater since March, and in any case scheduled for deactivation, Tattnall was relieved without turnover by Sampson (DDG-10) a week later and she returned to Mayport on 8 September for three weeks of leave and upkeep. The ship visited Fort Lauderdale for Fleet Appreciation Week in mid-October then returned to Mayport to prepare for decommissioning. Tattnall was placed out of commission on 18 January 1991, struck from the Navy list on 12 January 1993 and stored at the Inactive Ships Maintenance Facility in Philadelphia, Pennsylvania. The old destroyer was sold for scrapping to International Shipbreaking Ltd., Brownsville, Texas, on 10 February 1999, towed to Brownsville by salvage tug Elsbeth III starting 18 March 1999 and dismantled at Brownsville between 12 April 1999 and 22 March 2000.
