= USS Leahy (DLG-16) =

Leahy class Guided missile cruiser

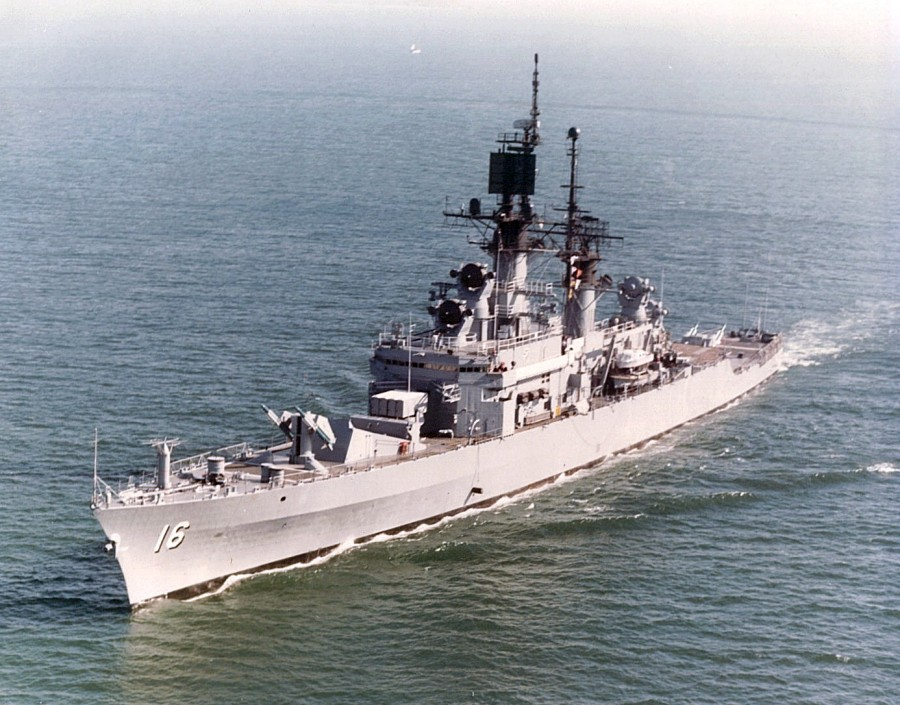
- USS Leahy

History

United States
- Name: Leahy
- Namesake: William D. Leahy
- Ordered: 7 November 1958
- Builder: Bath Iron Works Corp., Bath, Maine
- Laid down: 3 December 1959
- Launched: 1 July 1961
- Sponsored by: Mrs. Michael J. Mansfield
- Acquired: 27 July 1962
- Commissioned: 4 August 1962
- Decommissioned: 18 February 1967
- Recommissioned: 4 May 1968
- Decommissioned: 1 October 1993
- Reclassified: CG-16 on 1 July 1975
- Stricken: 1 October 1993
- Home port: Boston, MA (1962); Charleston, SC (1963); Norfolk, VA (1968); San Diego, CA (1976)
- Motto: Prompta et Parata (Prompt and Ready)
- Nickname(s): "Sweet 16"
- Fate: Dismantled/scrapped in Brownsville, Texas 2005 by International Shipbreaking Limited
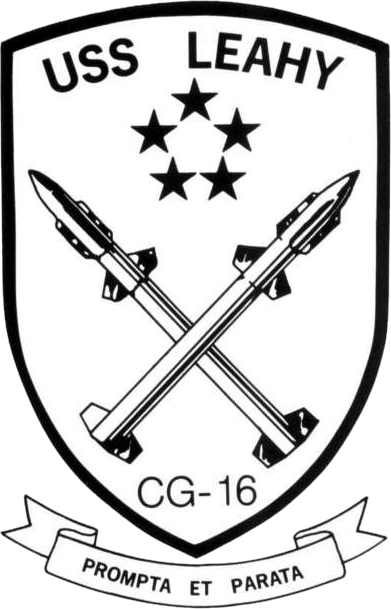
- Badge

General characteristics
- Class & type: Leahy-class cruiser
- Displacement: 8281 tons fully loaded
- Length: 533 ft (162 m)
- Beam: 55 ft (17 m)
- Draft: 26 ft (7.9 m)
- Propulsion: 2 shaft; gear turbines; 4 boilers; 85,000 shp (63,000 kW)
- Speed: 32 knots (37 mph; 59 km/h)
- Range: 8,000 nmi (15,000 km) at 20 knots (23 mph; 37 km/h)
- Complement: 37 officers and 408 enlisted
- Sensors & processing systems: AN/SPS-39 followed by AN/SPS-48 3D air search radar; AN/SPS-43 followed by AN/SPS-49 2D air search radar; AN/SPS-10 surface search radar; AN/SPG-55 missile fire control radar; AN/SQS-23 bow mounted sonar
- Electronic warfare & decoys: AN/SLQ-32; Mark 36 SRBOC
- Armament: 2 × Mark 10 Terrier SAM; 1 × RUR-5 ASROC ASW system; 2 × 3-inch (76 mm)/50 cal. twin gun mounts (replaced with Harpoon ASMs and Phalanx CIWS in 1981); 2 × triple MK 32 ASW torpedo launchers with MK 46 torpedoes

USS Leahy (hull number DLG/CG-16) was the lead ship of a new class of destroyer leaders in the United States Navy. Named for Fleet Admiral William D. Leahy, she was commissioned on 4 August 1962 as DLG-16, a guided missile frigate, and reclassified as CG-16, a guided missile cruiser, on 30 June 1975.

From 1962 to 1976, Leahy operated as a unit of the Atlantic Fleet and from 1976 to 1993 as a unit of the Pacific Fleet. She made six Mediterranean deployments (Sixth Fleet), two UNITAS Latin America cruises and eight Western Pacific deployments (Seventh Fleet), completed three Panama Canal transits, and crossed the equator over a dozen times. She traveled the seas from the easternmost end of the Mediterranean to the westernmost edge of the Indian Ocean. She steamed far north to Leningrad, Russia, and the Aleutian Islands; and far south for two passages through the Straits of Magellan. Over the course of her sixteen major deployments, Leahy made port calls on six continents—North America, South America, Europe, Asia, Africa and Australia.

Leahy served longer than any other ship of her class. After more than 31 years of active service all over the globe, the "Sweet 16" was decommissioned on 1 October 1993. After another 11 years in the reserve fleet, she was scrapped in Brownsville, Texas, in 2005.

== Design and construction ==
Leahy was the first of a new "double-ender" class fitted with Terrier (later Standard ER) missile launchers fore and aft, and the first and only frigate class designed without a main gun battery for shore bombardment or ship-vs.-ship engagements. The gun armament was reduced in order to carry a larger missile load. One of the principal missions of these ships, like their predecessors, the Farragut class, was to form part of the anti-air (AAW) and anti-submarine (ASW) screen for carrier task forces while also controlling aircraft from the carrier by providing vectors to assigned targets.

Leahy carried over the propulsion plant of the Farragut class, fitted into a longer hull designed with a knuckled "hurricane" bow that reduced plunging in rough seas, thus keeping her forecastle dry as needed to operate the forward missile launcher. Other features included an expanded electrical plant and increased endurance. A major design innovation was the use of "macks"—combined masts and stacks—on which the radars could be mounted without smoke interference.

Close-in anti-aircraft defense consisted of a pair of twin MK 22 3-inch/50 caliber guns; anti-submarine armament consisted of RUR-5 ASROC and two triple MK 32 torpedo mounts. The 3-inch gun mounts were replaced with Harpoon anti-ship missiles (ASM) and the Phalanx CIWS during an overhaul in 1981.

Leahy was laid down by Bath Iron Works Corp., Bath, Maine, 3 December 1959; launched 1 July 1961; sponsored by Mrs. Michael J. Mansfield, wife of Senator Mansfield, Montana, Senate Majority Leader; and commissioned 4 August 1962. For the traditional "mast stepping" ceremony during construction, an 1875 silver dollar was placed beneath the forward mack to honor the birth year of Fleet Admiral William D. Leahy.

== History ==
After shakedown in the Caribbean, Leahy departed Boston on 19 September 1963 and reported to Charleston, South Carolina., where RADM E. E. Grimm, Commander Cruiser-Destroyer Flotilla 6, selected her as his flagship. She then proceeded to the Jacksonville, Florida operating areas for type training. She briefly put into home port in November, then returned to the Caribbean to participate in AA warfare exercises.

On 2 January 1964, the DLG was again bound for the Caribbean for missile training, which ended 26 February. From 1 to 10 April, she joined in an amphibious exercise, "Quick Kick V," and on 1 June was permanently assigned to Destroyer Squadron 6.

Leahy departed for duty with the Sixth Fleet on 17 July as part of a Fast Carrier Task Group, which included the aircraft carrier Forrestal, and participated in a coordinated fleet exercise, "MEDLANDEX-64," between the Balearic Islands and Sardinia. She then carried out independent training in the eastern Mediterranean before departing from Naples, Italy, on 22 September to join in NATO exercise "FALLEX-64." She returned to Naples on 26 October and, in November, participated in another fleetwide exercise, "POOPDECK-IV," which brought some 40 ships of Task Force 60 together off the coast of Spain.

Leahy departed from Barcelona, Spain, on 2 December 1964 for replenishment, and on 14 December drew the curtain on 32,750 nautical miles (60,653 km) of steaming while deployed with the Sixth Fleet. She arrived at Charleston on 22 December and began a period of restricted availability in preparation for extensive tests to evaluate the Terrier Missile System. During these tests, which were completed in September 1965, Leahy was briefly deployed for the Dominican Republic Crisis from 28 April to 7 May 1965 as a unit of the Strike and Covering Force.

The vessel departed from Charleston on 30 November 1965 for the Mediterranean and relieved the destroyer William V. Pratt at Puerto Pollensa, Majorca, 9 December. During this second deployment with the Sixth Fleet, she operated throughout the Mediterranean participating in ASW, gunnery, and AA warfare exercises as well as major fleet tactical operations alongside other NATO ships.

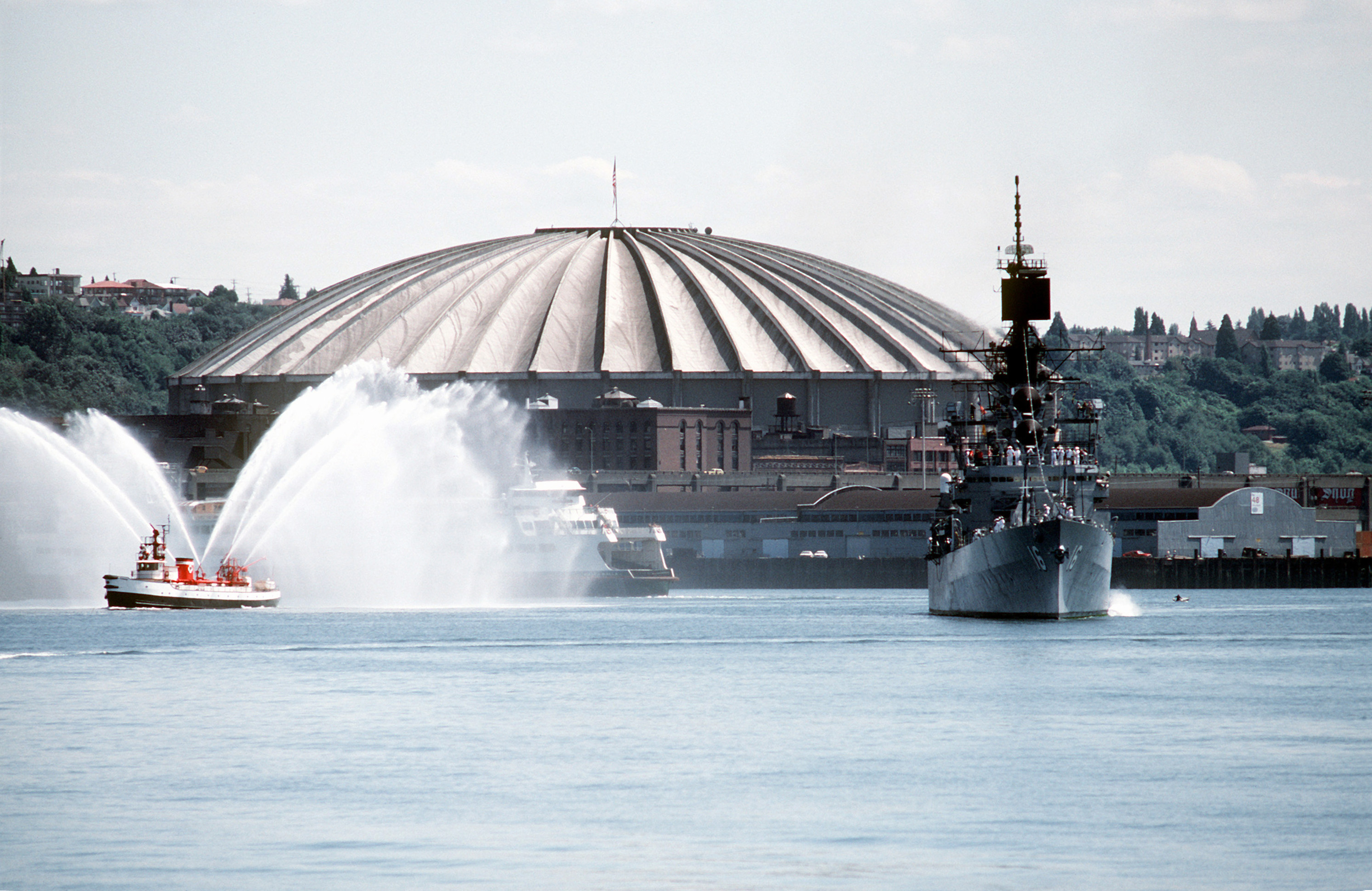
Leahy and the Kingdome.

Leahy returned home to Charleston on 8 April 1966. During June and July, she gave some 60 midshipmen from Annapolis at-sea training, and visited ports along the Atlantic coast and in the Caribbean. Following this, Leahy conducted exercises with the navies of many South American countries as part of operation UNITAS VII. She sailed through the Panama Canal in early September, thence south and through the Straits of Magellan at the end of October.

The operation was completed on 6 December 1966 and the DLG returned to Charleston on 15 December. Leahy then prepared for massive modernization at Philadelphia Naval Shipyard, arriving there on 27 January 1967 and decommissioning on 18 February. For over a year the ship received new AAW and ASW equipment, allowing her to utilize the most recent developments in the technology of naval warfare. The destroyer leader was placed in commission, special, on 4 May 1968 for the extensive period of testing her updated weapons systems. Leaving Philadelphia on 18 August, she arrived at her new home port, Norfolk, 3 days later.

A second shakedown cruise and training on the new weapons systems lasted into 1969. In August, Leahy took part in UNITAS X, which included ships from the navies of Brazil, Argentina, Colombia, Chile, Ecuador, Peru, Venezuela, and Uruguay. She returned to Norfolk, VA shortly before Christmas.

In September 1970, while on a routine missile exercise, Leahy was ordered to make an emergency deployment to the eastern Mediterranean as part of a contingency force in response to the Jordanian Crisis. She remained there for more than seven months operating with the Forrestal battle group, returning home to Norfolk in May 1971. For her efforts, she received the first of her five Meritorious Unit Commendations. Leahy deployed once more to the Mediterranean in 1972 and, after an overhaul at Norfolk Naval Shipyard, again in 1974. During the 1974 deployment, she operated extensively with the America battle group and made port calls in France, Spain, Italy, Greece, and Turkey.

In 1975, Leahy deployed to the Mediterranean for a sixth time. Prior to entering the Mediterranean, she participated with the destroyer Tattnall (COMCRUDESGRU 12, RADM Langille, and staff embarked) in an historic port call at Leningrad in the USSR. Leahy and Tattnall were the first U.S. warships to visit the Soviet Union since World War II. During the five-day visit, Leahy hosted over 12,300 visitors. Her crew participated in a variety of athletic contests with local teams, and enjoyed visits to a hockey game and the Kirov Ballet. She also received a visit from Elizabeth Taylor, who was on location filming The Blue Bird. Leahy then made port calls in Helsinki, Finland and Portsmouth, England before making her way into the Mediterranean. During the deployment she visited Spain, France, Monaco (for Fourth of July celebrations and Princess Grace's Red Cross Ball), Italy, Greece, and Turkey.

USS Leahy was redesignated CG-16 (guided missile cruiser) on 30 June 1975, as part of the United States Navy 1975 ship reclassification. Her sister ships were also redesignated as guided missile cruisers.

In January 1976, Leahy was transferred to the Pacific Fleet and, after transiting the Panama Canal, entered her new home port of San Diego. On 6 June 1976, she rescued 22 crewmembers off the research vessel Aquasition, which caught fire at sea and eventually sank. On 1 November 1976, she entered drydock for an overhaul at the Long Beach Naval Shipyard, which lasted a year. She did not make her first deployment to the Western Pacific until July 1978, when she served as part of the Constellation carrier battle group. She made stops at Okinawa, Yokosuka, Taiwan, Singapore, the Philippines, and South Korea before returning to the United States in February 1979.

Leahy’s next deployment to the Western Pacific began in May 1980. By September, she was in the Arabian Sea supporting the Midway and Dwight D. Eisenhower carrier battle groups. In October, she entered the Persian Gulf to provide anti-aircraft support for Saudi Arabia against possible attacks by Iran. Her stay in the Persian Gulf was short and the Leahy returned to San Diego on 4 December. The ship began another overhaul in January 1981 that lasted into May.

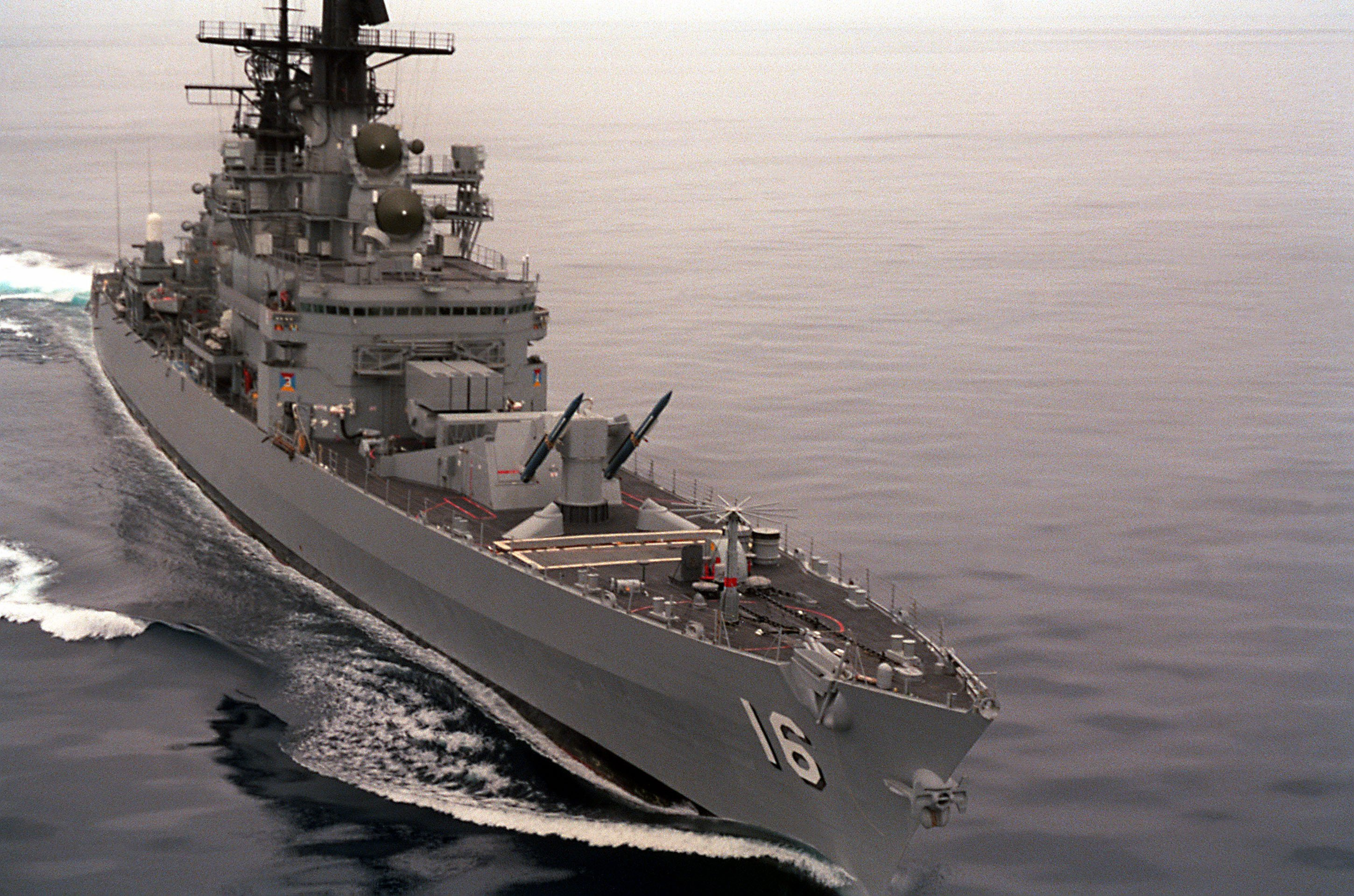
Leahy in 1989

Leahy's next Western Pacific deployment began in March 1983 as part of a battle group with the newly reactivated battleship New Jersey. During the cruise, she visited ports in the Philippines, Japan, South Korea, and Hong Kong. In 1984, she operated with the aircraft carrier Carl Vinson in the Western Pacific and Indian Ocean, then deployed to the Persian Gulf in 1985. In 1986, again escorting Carl Vinson, she deployed to the Western Pacific and the Persian Gulf.

After a New Threat Upgrade modernization that lasted into 1988, Leahy returned to regular duty with the Pacific Fleet. In 1990, she served as the senior host ship for the Soviet Navy’s historic first trip to San Diego, which was also the first Russian visit to any west coast naval base. In April 1991, she arrived in the Persian Gulf shortly after the completion of Operation Desert Storm. In 1992, while serving part of the Kitty Hawk battle group, Leahy helped direct United Nations UNOSOM relief flights into Mogadishu, Somalia as part of Operation Restore Hope. In early 1993, Leahy was ordered to the northern Persian Gulf to take part in the newly authorized Operation Southern Watch, enforcing a "no-fly" zone in southern Iraq.

In 1993, Leahy won a Battle "E" for outstanding combat preparedness, as well as excellence awards in anti-aircraft warfare and anti-submarine warfare. At the time, she was the oldest conventional cruiser in the Navy’s inventory.

== Decommissioning ==
Leahy was decommissioned on 1 October 1993 and stricken from the Naval Vessel Register (NVR) the same day. On 8 October 1993, she was transferred to the USDOT Maritime Administration (MARAD) and laid up as part of the Suisun Bay Reserve Fleet in Benicia, CA. In 2004, she was towed by USNS Navajo to the former Rodman Naval Station in the Canal Zone. From there she was towed by USNS Mohawk and on 21 June 2004 arrived at the Naval Inactive Ship Maintenance Facility in Beaumont, Texas.

On 24 July 2004, Leahy was moved to the International Shipbreaking Limited yards in Brownsville, Texas to be dismantled. Scrapping started the first week of August 2004, 42 years after her 4 August 1962 commissioning. Three of her sisters, Gridley, England and Halsey, passed this way before her. Scrapping was completed 6 July 2005, 44 years after her 1 July 1961 launch date.

In October 2013, the ship's bell, builder's plaque and other items were placed on long-term loan from the Naval History & Heritage Command to the Franklin County Historical Society Museum in Hampton, Iowa for an exhibit on native son William D. Leahy. In addition, the 1/48 scale model previously displayed at the Surface Warfare Officer's School in Newport, Rhode Island was loaned for the same exhibit.

== Awards and Commendations ==
Unit awards from Navy awards database.

	Joint Meritorious Unit Award	1992-1993
	Meritorious Unit Commendation	5 Awards: 1970, 1975-1976, 1984-1985, 1987, 1992-1993
Battle Effectiveness Award	Battle Effectiveness Award	3 Awards: 1982-1983, 1983-1984, 1991-1992
Navy Expeditionary Medal	Navy Expeditionary Medal	1980 (Indian Ocean, Iran)
	National Defense Medal	2 Awards: Vietnam War (1961-1974), Gulf War (1990-1995)
	Armed Forces Expeditionary Medal	3 Awards: 1965 (Dominican Republic), 1989 (Persian Gulf), 1993 (Somalia)
	Southwest Asia Service Medal	2 Awards: 1991, 1992-1993
	Sea Service Deployment Ribbon	9 Awards for post-1974 deployments

== Deployments and overhauls ==
Summary of all 16 major deployments and 5 yard overhauls.

Year	Location	Start	End	Comments
1964	Mediterranean	17 JUL 1964	22 DEC 1964	Operations with Forrestal task group. Port calls in France, Greece, Italy, Spain
1965–66	Mediterranean	30 NOV 1965	8 APR 1966	Operations with Task Group 60.1 and America. Port calls in Italy & Spain
1966	South America (UNITAS VII)	24 AUG 1966	15 DEC 1966	Operations with South American navies. Port calls in Puerto Rico, Colombia, Canal Zone, Ecuador, Peru, Chile, Argentina, Uruguay, Brazil, Trinidad, St. Thomas.
1967–68	Philadelphia Naval Shipyard	18 FEB 1967	4 MAY 1968	Decommissioned; AAW & ASW modernization
1969	South America (UNITAS X)	25 JUL 1969	11 DEC 1969	Operations with South American navies. Port calls in Puerto Rico, Colombia, Canal Zone, Ecuador, Peru, Chile, Argentina, Uruguay, Brazil, Venezuela.
1970–71	Mediterranean	14 SEP 1970	1 MAY 1971	Emergency early deployment with John F. Kennedy in response to the Jordanian Crisis. Port calls in Greece, Malta, Italy, Spain.
1972	Mediterranean	14 FEB 1972	5 SEP 1972	Operations with Franklin D. Roosevelt task group. Port calls in Spain, Italy, Greece, Turkey, France.
1972–73	Norfolk Naval Shipyard	14 NOV 1972	10 MAY 1973	Regular overhaul
1974	Mediterranean	4 JAN 1974	3 JUL 1974	Operations with America battle group. Port calls in France, Spain, Italy, Greece, Turkey.
1975	Northern Europe, Mediterranean	25 APR 1975	23 OCT 1975	Port calls in England, Russia, Finland, Spain, Monaco, France, Italy. First U.S. Navy post-WWII visit to Russia (Leningrad).
1976–77	Long Beach Naval Shipyard	9 SEP 1976	15 AUG 1977	Regular overhaul
1978–79	Western Pacific	6 JUL 1978	19 FEB 1979	Operations with Constellation battle group. Port calls in Hawaii, Japan, Okinawa, Philippines, Taiwan, Korea, Singapore, Guam.
1980	Western Pacific, Indian Ocean	15 MAY 1980	4 DEC 1980	Operations with Midway & Dwight D. Eisenhower. Port calls in Hawaii, Korea, Japan, Philippines, Diego Garcia, Singapore, Kenya.
1981–82	Long Beach Naval Shipyard	16 JAN 1981	25 FEB 1982	Regular overhaul
1983	Western Pacific	20 MAR 1983	17 SEP 1983	Operations with New Jersey battle group. Port calls in Hawaii, Alaska (Adak), Japan, Korea, Hong Kong, Philippines.
1984–85	Western Pacific, Indian Ocean	18 OCT 1984	25 MAY 1985	Operations with Carl Vinson battle group. Port calls in Hawaii, Japan, Hong Kong, Macao, Philippines, Kenya, Australia.
1986–87	Western Pacific, Indian Ocean	12 AUG 1986	6 FEB 1987	Operations with Carl Vinson battle group. Port calls in Japan, Philippines, Singapore, Maldives, Kenya, Diego Garcia, Australia.
1987–88	Long Beach Naval Shipyard	27 JUL 1987	25 AUG 1988	Regular overhaul, New Threat Upgrade (NTU)
1989–90	Western Pacific, Indian Ocean	10 AUG 1989	9 FEB 1990	Port calls in Hawaii, Philippines, Singapore, India, Bahrain, Dubai, Sri Lanka, Malaysia, Hong Kong.
1991	Western Pacific, Indian Ocean	26 FEB 1991	26 AUG 1991	Operation Desert Storm follow-up. Port calls in Hawaii, Philippines, Singapore, Sri Lanka, Bahrain, Abu Dhabi, Dubai, Thailand, Hong Kong.
1992–93	Western Pacific, Indian Ocean	3 NOV 1992	3 MAY 1993	Operation Restore Hope & Operation Southern Watch. Port calls in Hong Kong, UAE, Bahrain, Thailand, Singapore, Hawaii.

Note: Cruise books were published for all major deployments except 1972 and 1975. A Leahy Pictogram was published in August 1972 with deployment details and photographs of officers and crew.

== Plank owners ==
The 4 August 1962 commissioning crewmembers were the original 363 plank owners. The 1962 commissioning ceremony booklet lists 21 officers, 24 chief petty officers, 39 first class petty officers, 50 second class petty officers, 96 third class petty officers, 87 seamen and 46 firemen. Because Leahy was decommissioned on 18 February 1967 for a major overhaul and then recommissioned on 4 May 1968, a second group of plank owners was created. The 1968 commissioning ceremony booklet lists these additional 370 plank owners.

== Ship's seal and motto ==
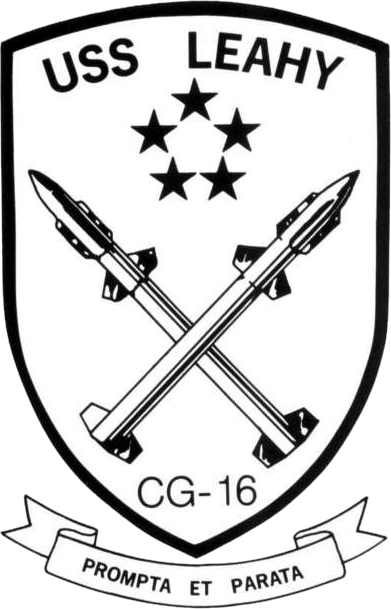

The ship's seal shows twin crossed missiles representing Leahy's status as the lead ship of the "double-ender" class of guided missile cruisers. The five stars represent her namesake, Fleet Admiral William D. Leahy.

Leahy's motto "Prompta et Parata" translates as "Prompt and Ready" from the Latin. The words are most well known from Cicero's De Officiis as part of the phrase "... the good will of men, on the other hand, prompt and ready for the advancement of our interests, is secured through wisdom and virtue."
