= Nick Arvin =

American engineer and writer

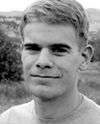
- Arvin in 2008
- Born: North Carolina, U.S.
- Education: University of Michigan; Stanford University; Iowa Writers' Workshop
- Occupations: Engineer; writer
- Website: www.nickarvin.com

Nick Arvin is an American engineer and writer.

== Early life and education ==
Arvin was born in North Carolina and raised in Michigan. He graduated from the University of Michigan and Stanford University with degrees in mechanical engineering. He is also a graduate of the Iowa Writers' Workshop. He has worked in forensic engineering and accident reconstruction.

== Writing career ==
He has published four books of fiction: The Reconstructionist, Articles of War, Mad Boy, and In the Electric Eden: Stories.

He has also had work published in The New Yorker.

== Personal life ==
He currently resides in Denver, Colorado.

== Awards ==
Articles of War was listed by Esquire magazine as one of the best books of the year and was awarded the Rosenthal Award from the American Academy of Arts and Letters, the W. Y. Boyd Literary Award for Excellence in Military Fiction from the American Library Association, and the Colorado Book Award. He is also the recipient of a Michener Fellowship and an Isherwood Foundation Grant.

In 2008, Arvin was awarded a Literature Fellowship by the National Endowment for the Arts.

== Bibliography ==
- In the Electric Eden: Stories. New York: Penguin Books, 2003. ISBN 0142002569 OCLC 50503312
- Articles of War. New York: Doubleday, 2005. ISBN 0385512775 OCLC 55502462
- The Reconstructionist. New York: Harper Perennial, 2012. ISBN 9780061995163 OCLC 730414075
- Mad Boy: An Account of Henry Phipps in the War of 1812. Europa Editions, 2018. ISBN 978-1609454586
