= Ralph Peters =

American military officer and author (born 1952)

- Born: April 19, 1952 (age 74); Pottsville, Pennsylvania, U.S.
- Education: Pennsylvania State University
- Alma mater: St. Mary's University, Texas (MA)
- Occupations: Former U.S. Army officer, military analyst, writer
- Political party: Independent
- Spouses: Janice Stickler; Marion Ann Martin; Katherine McIntire (m.1994)

Ralph Peters (born April 19, 1952) is a retired United States Army lieutenant colonel and author.

In addition to his non-fiction books, he has published eight novels under the pen name Owen Parry, including Honor's Kingdom, which was awarded the Hammett Prize. Three of his novels published as Ralph Peters received the W. Y. Boyd Literary Award for Excellence in Military Fiction.

== Early life and education ==
Peters was born in Pottsville, Pennsylvania, and grew up in nearby Schuylkill Haven. He is of German and Lutheran descent on his father's side, and Welsh and Methodist descent on his mother's. His father was a coal miner and businessman.

His wife, Katherine McIntire Peters, is the deputy editor of Government Executive, a division of Atlantic Media.

== Career ==
=== Military ===
Peters enlisted in the U.S. Army in 1976 following his graduation from Pennsylvania State University.

Peters' first assignment was in West Germany. After returning from West Germany, he attended Officer Candidate School and received a commission in 1980. He served with 1st Battalion, 46th Infantry Regiment, then part of the 1st Armored Division.

Peters spent ten years in West Germany working in military intelligence, and was later appointed a Foreign Area Officer, where he specialized in the Soviet Union. He attended the Command and General Staff College. His last assignment was in the Office of the Deputy Chief of Staff for Intelligence. He retired in 1998 as a lieutenant colonel, following 22 years of military service.

=== Author ===
Peters's first novel, Bravo Romeo, a spy thriller set in West Germany, was published in 1981. His subsequent novels progressed from futuristic scenarios involving the Soviet Army to themes such as contemporary terrorism and failed state issues. His protagonists are often presented as military mavericks who have the knowledge and courage to tackle problems others cannot or will not. In 2008, he published the memoir Looking for Trouble: Adventures in a Broken World. His novel The War After Armageddon was released in 2009. He is a regular contributor to the military history website Armchair General and also serves on its advisory board.

Peters has also written a number of historical war novels about the American Civil War that have been well received and recognized with the Hammett Prize and the W.Y. Boyd Literary Award for Excellence in Military Fiction.

He has published numerous essays on strategy in military journals such as Parameters, Military Review, and Armed Forces Journal, as well as reports for the United States Marine Corps (see Center for Emerging Threats and Opportunities). Peters formerly wrote a regular opinion column for the New York Post and has written essays and guest columns for USA Today, The Wall Street Journal, The Washington Post, Newsweek, The Weekly Standard, The Washington Monthly, and Army magazine. He is a member of the Board of Contributors for USA Today's Forum Page, part of the newspaper's Opinion section.

== Views ==
=== Iraq War ===
Peters strongly supported the 2003 invasion of Iraq and the ensuing Iraq War. In July 2017, Fox News host Tucker Carlson told Peters: "I would hate to go back and read your columns assuring America that taking out Saddam Hussein will make the region calmer, more peaceful, and America safer when, in fact, it has done exactly the opposite, and it has empowered Russia and Iran, the two countries you say you fear most."

=== Afghanistan ===
In February 2009, Peters called for U.S. troops to be pulled out of Afghanistan, writing, "we've mired ourselves by attempting to modernize a society that doesn't want to be – and cannot be – transformed." He continued, "We needed to smash our enemies and leave. Had it proved necessary, we could have returned later for another punitive mission. Instead, we fell into the great American fallacy of believing ourselves responsible for helping those who've harmed us."

==== Bowe Bergdahl ====
Peters expressed sympathy for POW Sergeant Bowe Bergdahl's family, but speculated (Fox News, July 19, 2009) that Bergdahl might be "an apparent deserter ... if he walked away from his post and his buddies in wartime – I don't care how hard it sounds – as far as I'm concerned the Taliban can save us a lot of legal hassles and legal bills." He characterized Bergdahl's description (in the Taliban produced video) of U.S. military behavior in Afghanistan as collaboration with the enemy, even if coerced. Peters hoped Bergdahl would be reunited with his family, but argued that the US media had glorified one captured soldier who Peters claimed had shamed his unit and lied, while ignoring genuine heroes and casualties (The O'Reilly Factor, July 21).

=== Donald Rumsfeld ===
In 2011, Peters criticized former Defense Secretary Donald Rumsfeld, saying: "I am allergic to Rumsfeld. We did a great thing in Iraq, but we did it very badly. He is an extremely talented man but he has the tragic flaw of hubris. His arrogance is unbearable. My friends in uniform just hate him."

=== Obama foreign policy ===
During Stuart Varney's Fox Business Network show on December 7, 2015, Peters referred to President Barack Obama as a "total pussy", leading Fox News to suspend him for two weeks.

=== Russia ===
In July 2017, Peters said that Russian President Vladimir Putin "is comparable" to Adolf Hitler. "He hates America. He wants to hurt us. ... Russia is evil. Russia is our enemy."

=== Israel ===
Peters praised President Donald Trump for his decision to recognize Jerusalem as Israel's capital in December 2017.

=== Fox News ===
In March 2018, Peters publicly quit his role as an expert commentator on Fox News. In his farewell letter to colleagues, he wrote:

Four decades ago, I took an oath as a newly commissioned officer. I swore to "support and defend the Constitution," and that oath did not expire when I took off my uniform. Today, I feel that Fox News is assaulting our constitutional order and the rule of law, while fostering corrosive and unjustified paranoia among viewers. Over my decade with Fox, I long was proud of the association. Now I am ashamed.

In the same letter, he also called the Trump administration "ethically ruinous" and accused Fox News of "harming our system of government for profit", calling the network a "propaganda machine" for the Trump administration. On Anderson Cooper 360°, Peters likened Trump's behavior to sedition.

== Awards ==
In 2013, Peters was named as the recipient of the W.Y. Boyd Literary Award for Excellence in Military Fiction from the American Library Association for his novel Cain at Gettysburg. He received the award again in 2014 for Hell or Richmond and in 2016 for Valley of the Shadow and in 2020 for Darkness at Chancellorsville.

In 2002, he received the Hammett Prize from the International Association of Crime Writers, North American Branch (IACW/NA) for Honor's Kingdom.

== Published works ==
=== Novels ===
- As Ralph Peters
  - Bravo Romeo – 1981 ISBN 978-0399900976
  - Red Army – 1989 ISBN 978-0671676681
  - The War in 2020 – 1991 ISBN 0671676709
  - Flames of Heaven: A Novel of the End of the Soviet Union – 1993 ISBN 0671737384
  - The Perfect Soldier – 1995 ISBN 0671865838
  - Twilight of Heroes – 1997 ISBN 9780380788989
  - The Devil's Garden – 1998 ISBN 978-0811731065
  - Traitor – 1999 ISBN 0380976412
  - The War After Armageddon – 2009 ISBN 978-0765323552
  - The Officers' Club – 2011 ISBN 978-0765326805
  - Cain at Gettysburg – 2012 ISBN 978-0765330475
  - Hell or Richmond – 2013 ISBN 978-0765330482
  - Valley of the Shadow – 2015 ISBN 978-0765374035
  - The Damned of Petersburg – 2016 ISBN 978-0765374066
  - Judgment at Appomattox – 2017 ISBN 0765381702
  - Darkness at Chancellorsville: A Novel of Stonewall Jackson's Triumph and Tragedy – 2019 ISBN 0765381737
- As Owen Parry
  - Faded Coat of Blue – 1999 ISBN 978-0380976423; OCLC 41035507
  - Shadows of Glory – 2000 ISBN 978-0380976430; OCLC 44949833
  - Call Each River Jordan – 2001 ISBN 978-0060186388; OCLC 48754087
  - Honor's Kingdom – 2002 ISBN 978-0060186340; OCLC 48613435
  - The Bold Sons of Erin – 2003 ISBN 978-0060513900; OCLC 52041095
  - Our Simple Gifts: Civil War Christmas Tales – 2004 ISBN 978-0060013783; OCLC 49699128
  - Strike the Harp!: American Christmas Stories – 2004 ISBN 978-0060572365; OCLC 54529066
  - The Rebels of Babylon: a Novel – 2005 ISBN 978-0060513924; OCLC 56068791
- As Robert Paston
  - The Hour of the Innocents – 2014 ISBN 978-0765326812

=== Nonfiction ===
- Fighting for the Future: Will America Triumph? – 1999 ISBN 0811706516
- Beyond Terror: Strategy in a Changing World – 2002 ISBN 0811700240
- Beyond Baghdad: Postmodern War and Peace – 2003 ISBN 0811700844
- New Glory: Expanding America's Global Supremacy – 2005 ISBN 1595230114
- Never Quit the Fight – 2006 ISBN 978-0811702744
- Wars of Blood and Faith: The Conflicts That Will Shape the 21st Century – 2007 ISBN 081170274X
- Looking for Trouble: Adventures in a Broken World – 2008 ISBN 0811734102
- Endless War – 2010 ISBN 978-0811705509
- Lines of Fire: A Renegade Writes on Strategy, Intelligence, and Security – 2011 ISBN 0811705889
