= Howard Bahr =

American novelist

- Born: Meridian, Mississippi
- Education: University of Mississippi
- Writing career
- Language: English
- Genres: Military fiction Historical fiction
- Notable awards: W.Y. Boyd Literary Award for Excellence in Military Fiction for The Black Flower; Michael Shaara Award for Excellence in Civil War Fiction for The Judas Field

Howard Bahr (born 1946) is an American novelist, born in Meridian, Mississippi.

== Early life ==
Bahr, who served in the U.S. Navy during the Vietnam War and then worked for several years on the railroads, enrolled at the University of Mississippi in the early 1970s when he was in his late 20s. He received his B.A. and M.A. from Ole Miss and served as the curator of the William Faulkner house, Rowan Oak, in Oxford, Mississippi, for nearly twenty years.

== Literary career ==
He also taught American literature during much of this time at the University of Mississippi. In 1993, he became an instructor of English at Motlow State College in Tullahoma, Tennessee, where he worked until 2006. Bahr is the author of three critically acclaimed novels centering on the American Civil War. He currently resides in Jackson, Mississippi, and teaches courses in creative writing at Belhaven University.

Bahr began his writing career in the 1970s, writing both fiction and non-fiction articles that appeared in publications such as Southern Living, Civil War Times Illustrated, as well as the short-lived regional publication, Lagniappe (1974–75) which he and Franklin Walker co-edited. His first published book, a children's story entitled "Home for Christmas," came out in 1987 and was re-published in 1997 in a different edition (with new illustrations) following the release of his first novel, The Black Flower: A Novel of the Civil War. This latter book, set during the Battle of Franklin in 1864, was a New York Times Notable Book.

In 2000, Bahr's second novel, The Year of Jubilo, was released. This novel, set in the immediate aftermath of the Civil War in the fictional Mississippi town of Cumberland, deals with the dehumanizing effects of war and its aftermath on Southern society. The Year of Jubilo, like The Black Flower, was a New York Times Notable Book.

Bahr's third novel, The Judas Field, was released in 2006. In The Judas Field, Bahr again returns to the Battle of Franklin theme, but this time it is through the eyes of one of its participants, again from Cumberland, who travels back to the battlefield in the 1880s to recover the body of one of the fallen, and, in doing so, relives the horror of that fateful day in 1864.

Bahr's fourth novel, Pelican Road, published in 2008, is a novel of the railroads. It is named for its Christmas 1940 setting on "207 miles of ballasted heavyweight main line rail between Meridian, Mississippi, and New Orleans."

== Awards ==
His novel The Black Flower: A Novel of the Civil War received the W.Y. Boyd Literary Award for Excellence in Military Fiction in 1998.

His third novel, The Judas Field was awarded the Michael Shaara Award for Excellence in Civil War Fiction.
