= Edwin H. Simmons =

United States Marine Corps general

Edwin Howard Simmons
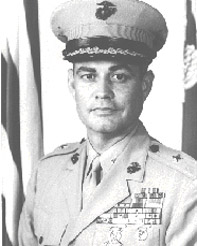
- Born: August 25, 1921; Billingsport, New Jersey, U.S.
- Died: May 5, 2007 (aged 85); Alexandria, Virginia, U.S.
- Burial place: Arlington National Cemetery, Section 25, Grave 1902
- Military career
- Allegiance: United States of America
- Branch: United States Marine Corps
- Service years: 1942–1978
- Rank: Brigadier general
- Nickname: "Collective memory of the Marine Corps"
- Commands: 9th Marines; Marine Corps History and Museums
- Conflicts: World War II – Battle of Guam; Korean War –Battle of Inchon –Second Battle of Seoul –Battle of Chosin Reservoir; Vietnam War
- Awards: Distinguished Service Medal; Silver Star; Legion of Merit (3); Bronze Star (2) with Combat "V"; Purple Heart
- Other work: Marine Corps History and Museums, Director Emeritus

Edwin Howard Simmons (August 25, 1921 – May 5, 2007) was a United States Marine Corps brigadier general. He was a career officer who served in combat during three wars — including landing at Inchon and fighting at the Chosin Reservoir in the Korean War. He was renowned as the official Marine Corps historian, being called "the collective memory of the Marine Corps". His 1974 book The United States Marines: A History is a seminal reference text.

== Biography ==
Edwin Howard Simmons was born on August 25, 1921, in Paulsboro, New Jersey, and graduated from Paulsboro High School in 1938. He earned a Bachelor of Arts in journalism in 1942 at Lehigh University, where he had been elected to Phi Beta Kappa the previous year, and a master's degree in journalism in 1955 at Ohio State University. Prior to accepting his commission as a Marine Corps second lieutenant on June 12, 1942, he held an Army Reserve commission.

During World War II, he trained at Marine Corps Schools, Marine Corps Base Quantico, and Camp Lejeune, N.C., prior to serving overseas with the 5th Field Depot in the South and Central Pacific. He took part in combat during the capture of Guam and later served with the 7th Service Regiment on Okinawa and in China. He was promoted to captain in January 1944 and to major in June 1949.

Following the war, he served for three and one-half years as Managing Editor of the Marine Corps Gazette, then completed the Amphibious Warfare School, Junior Course, Quantico, in 1950.

At the outbreak of the Korean War, he commanded the Weapons Company, 1st Battalion, 6th Marines, Camp Lejeune. The half-strength battalion was just back from the Mediterranean when it boarded a troop train west. It was redesignated 3rd Battalion, 1st Marines. They were ordered to South Korea in August 1950 and participated in the Inchon Landing that September. He continued in combat as weapons company commander during the initial phases of the war; and as a battalion operations officer and executive officer during the Chinese Spring Offensive.

Returning to the United States in July 1951, he served in various assignments with the Training and Replacement Command at Camp Pendleton, California; with the Naval ROTC unit at Ohio State University; and with the G-4 Division at Headquarters Marine Corps. He was promoted to lieutenant colonel in December 1954. From August 1959 until October 1960, he served as Naval Attaché to the Dominican Republic. Carbine rifles from his office, left behind after the United States interrupted formal diplomatic relations, were used in the assassination of Rafael Trujillo according to the Church Committee. However, Simmons denied he played any direct role in the assassination. Prior to returning to the Dominican Republic in September 1961 as U.S. Military Liaison Officer, U.S. Embassy, Santo Domingo, he was assigned as senior editor, Publications Group, Marine Corps Schools, Quantico. In January 1962, he joined the Strategic Plans Section, G-3 Division at Headquarters Marine Corps, and in July 1963 was promoted to colonel.

From July 1965 until July 1966, he served in South Vietnam, first as G-3 of III Marine Amphibious Force (III MAF), and later, as commanding officer, 9th Marine Regiment, the "Striking Ninth".

Returning from Vietnam, he was a student at the National War College for the next year prior to reporting to Headquarters Marine Corps where he served as Deputy Fiscal Director of the Marine Corps from August 1967 until May 1970. He was advanced to the rank of brigadier general on June 1, 1968.

Brigadier General Simmons returned to Vietnam for another one-year tour, and served as Assistant Division Commander, 1st Marine Division (Rein), "The Old Breed", and subsequently as deputy commander, III MAF.

He returned to Headquarters Marine Corps on July 20, 1971, where he became special assistant to the chief of staff for strategic studies.

On December 1, 1971, he assumed duties as director of Marine Corps History and Museums. He went on the retired list on July 1, 1972, but continued on active duty without interruption of service as director of Marine Corps History and Museums.

On July 1, 1978, he reverted to inactive status on the retired list. In late October 1978, he returned as a Civil Service employee to his previous position as director of Marine Corps History and Museums.

Brigadier General Simmons died on May 5, 2007, at his home in Alexandria, Virginia. He is survived by his wife, the former Frances G. Bliss of Denver, Colorado, two sons, Edwin H. Jr., and Clarke V., and two daughters, Bliss and Courtney.

== Memberships ==
He was a fellow, governor, and treasurer of the Company of Military Historians and a member of the boards of trustees of the American Military Institute, the Marine Corps War Memorial Foundation, and the United States Commission on Military History.

He also served as president of the 1st Marine Division Association, president of the American Society of Military Comptrollers, and vice-president of the National War College Alumni Association.

In 1970, he received a Centennial Distinguished Graduate Medallion from Ohio State University.

== Publications ==
Simmons wrote for numerous military and general publications, including the Naval Review, Naval Institute Proceedings, Marine Corps Gazette, Sea Power, and Army. He was the author of the history, 'The United States Marines (published in London, 1974; and New York, 1976) and contributed extensively to various histories and standard works including the Encyclopædia Britannica and the Dictionary of American History.

His novel, Dog Company Six, received the W.Y. Boyd Literary Award for Excellence in Military Fiction from the American Library Association in 2001, and the Samuel Eliot Morison Award for Naval Literature in 2000.

== Honors ==
In May 2013, construction began for the Senator John W. Warner Center for Advanced Military Studies at Marine Corps University in Quantico, Virginia. A portion of this facility will house the Brigadier General Edwin H. Simmons Center for Marine Corps History. The Simmons Center will consolidate resources from the Marine Corps History Division and the Archives and Special Collections Branch, currently held in three locations, into one facility.

== Military awards ==
Simmons's military decorations and awards include:

1st Row	Navy Distinguished Service Medal	Silver Star	Legion of Merit with 2 gold 5/16 inch stars and Combat "V"	Bronze Star with 1 gold 5/16 inch star and Combat "V"
2nd Row	Purple Heart	Meritorious Service Medal	Navy and Marine Corps Commendation Medal with Combat "V"	Combat Action Ribbon
3rd Row	Navy Presidential Unit Citation with 3 service stars	Navy Unit Commendation with 1 service star	China Service Medal	American Campaign Medal
4th Row	Asiatic-Pacific Campaign Medal	World War II Victory Medal	National Defense Service Medal with 1 service star	Korean Service Medal with 5 service stars
5th Row	Vietnam Service Medal with 5 service stars	National Order of Vietnam, Knight	Vietnam Gallantry Cross with 2 palms and 1 silver star	Korean Presidential Unit Citation
6th Row	Vietnam Gallantry Cross Unit Citation with palm and frame	Vietnam Civil Actions Unit Citation with palm and frame	United Nations Service Medal for Korea	Vietnam Campaign Medal with 1960- device

== Selected works by Edwin H. Simmons ==
- Simmons, Edwin H. (1976). United States Marines: the First Two Hundred Years 1775–1975. Viking Adult. ISBN 978-0-670-74101-4.
- Simmons, Edwin H. (2000). Dog Company Six. Naval Institute Press. ISBN 9781557508980. A novel about the Korean War.
- Simmons, Edwin H. (2000). Over the Seawall: U.S. Marines at Inchon. Marine Corps Association. ISBN 978-0-16-050452-5.
- Simmons, Edwin H. (2003). The United States Marines: A History (4th ed.). Naval Institute Press.
- Simmons, Edwin H. (December 30, 2005). "Leathernecks at Soissons". Naval History. History of Marines at the Battle of Soissons during World War I.
- Simmons, Edwin H; Alexander, Joseph H. (2008). Through the Wheat: the U.S. Marines in World War I. Annapolis, MD: Naval Institute Press.

== See also ==
- History of the United States Marine Corps
- National Museum of the Marine Corps
