= W. Y. Boyd Literary Award for Excellence in Military Fiction =

American literary award

The W. Y. Boyd Literary Award for Excellence in Military Fiction is awarded annually by the American Library Association for "the best fiction set in a period when the United States was at war." The award intends to recognize "the service of American veterans and military personnel."

The Award was funded by William Young Boyd II (1926-2015), author, and World War II veteran. Boyd was Chairman of the Board of the Boyd Steamship Corporation.

Author	Book	Year Award Received
Robert Inman	Villages	2026
Tim Wendel	Rebel Falls	2025
P. T. Deutermann	Iwo, 26 Charlie	2024
P. T. Deutermann	The Last Paladin	2023
Jeff Shaara	The Eagle's Claw	2022
Mark Treanor	A Quiet Cadence: A Novel	2021
Ralph Peters	Darkness at Chancellorsville	2020
Ray McPadden	And The Whole Mountain Burned	2019
Jeff Shaara	The Frozen Hours: A Novel of the Korean War	2018
J. M. Graham	Arizona Moon	2017
Ralph Peters	Valley of the Shadow	2016
Phil Klay	Redeployment	2015
Ralph Peters	Hell or Richmond	2014
Ralph Peters	Cain at Gettysburg	2013
P. T. Deutermann	Pacific Glory	2012
Karl Marlantes	Matterhorn	2011
John Hough, Jr.	Seen the Glory	2010
Richard Bausch	Peace	2009
Robert N. Macomber	A Different Kind of Honor	2008
Robert J. Mrazek	The Deadly Embrace	2007
Nick Arvin	Articles of War	2006
Jeff Shaara	To The Last Man: A Novel of The First World War	2005
James L. Nelson	Glory In The Name: A Novel of the Confederate Navy	2004
James Brady	Warning of War	2003
Owen West	Sharkman Six	2002
Edwin H. Simmons	Dog Company Six	2001
John Mort	Soldier in Paradise	2000
Donald McCaig	Jacob’s Ladder: A Story of Virginia During the War	1999
Howard Bahr	The Black Flower: A Novel of the Civil War	1998
Jeff Shaara	Gods and Generals	1997
