= Tim Wendel (writer) =

American writer (born 1956)

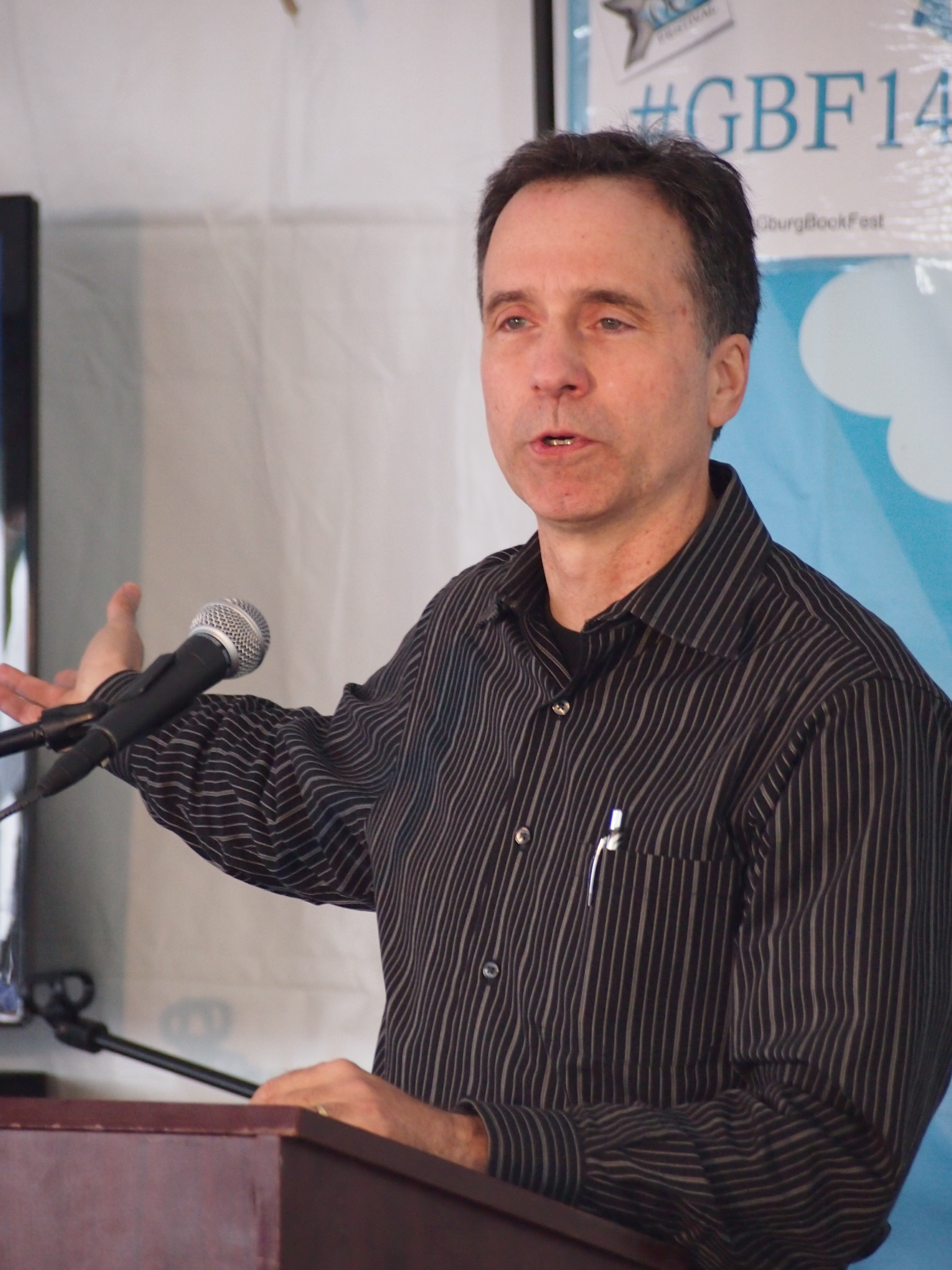
- Wendel at the Gaithersburg Book Festival
- Born: 1956 (age 69–70); Philadelphia, Pennsylvania, U.S.
- Education: Johns Hopkins University, Syracuse University

Tim Wendel (born 1956 in Philadelphia) is an American writer whose books include narrative nonfiction and several novels. Those works include Summer of '68, Cancer Crossings, High Heat, and the popular sports novel Castro's Curveball. His stories and columns have appeared in such publications as The New York Times, National Geographic, Esquire, USA Today, Psychology Today and Washington Post.

== Early life ==
Wendel grew up in Lockport, New York, and spent his winters playing hockey and his summers sailing on Lake Ontario. Both are backdrops for his award-winning family memoir, Cancer Crossings.

He has a bachelor's degree in magazine journalism from Syracuse University and a master's degree in writing from Johns Hopkins.

== Career ==
Wendel is the author of more than a dozen books, including Summer of '68: The Season When Baseball, and America, Changed Forever, which was a Top 10 choice by Publishers Weekly and also a Notable Book of the Year by the State of Michigan.

After beginning his writing career as a sportswriter, with such titles as Going for the Gold, The New Face of Baseball, and Buffalo, Home of the Braves, Wendel found success as an award-winning novelist. Escape from Castro's Cuba was a 2022 Finalist Next Generation Indie Book Award finalist, and his historical thriller Rebel Falls is scheduled to be released in spring 2024.

A writer in residence at Johns Hopkins University, Wendel has been awarded the Professional Achievement Award and the Award for Teaching Excellence from Johns Hopkins University, both three times. He is a recipient of the Walter E. Dakin Fellow and Tennessee Williams Scholar to the Sewanee Writers' Conference. In addition, he has narrated and produced several audiobooks and appeared on PBS, NPR, CNN and ESPN.

Wendel was one of the founding members of USA Today Baseball Weekly, which he edited and wrote for.

Wendel has garnered the Latino History Award and won the USA Today Luminary Award.

In 2025 he was honored by the American Library Association with the W. Y. Boyd Literary Award for Excellence in Military Fiction.

== Personal life ==
He currently lives in Virginia with his wife, Jacqueline Salmon. They have two children.
