= P. T. Deutermann =

American novelist

- Born: December 27, 1941 (age 84); Boston, Massachusetts
- Occupation: Author
- Writing career
- Period: 1992–present
- Genres: Mystery; Police Procedural; Thriller; Detective
- Military career
- Relatives: Vice Admiral H. T. Deutermann
- Allegiance: United States
- Branch: United States Navy
- Service years: 1963–1989
- Rank: Captain
- Commands: USS Tattnall (1981–1983)
- Conflicts: Vietnam War
- Website: www.ptdeutermann.com

Peter Thomas "P. T." Deutermann (born December 27, 1941) is an American writer of mystery, police procedural and thriller novels.

Deutermann served in the United States Navy for 26 years, earning 19 medals and decorations and retiring with the rank of captain. He served as the commander of the USS Tattnall between 1981 and 1983. He also served on the USS Morton, USS Hull, USS Jouett and USS Charles F. Adams, while also serving in both the Atlantic and Pacific Fleets.

== Biography ==
=== Early years ===
Deutermann was born in Boston, the son of Lieutenant Commander (later Vice Admiral) H. T. Deutermann. The family moved in 1944 to La Jolla, California, where they lived until the end of the war. Between the end of the war and 1959, when Deutermann entered the Naval Academy, the family lived in various places throughout the United States and also in Argentina. Deutermann attended parochial, public, and Jesuit high schools, graduating from Creighton Preparatory in Omaha, Nebraska, in 1959.

=== Military career ===
Deutermann was commissioned in 1963 in Annapolis, Maryland into the surface line, where he was ordered to the new destroyer USS Morton. He served on the Morton for two years, and was on board for the second Gulf of Tonkin Incident in September 1964, which precipitated the first significant aircraft carrier strikes against North Vietnam.

Following his tour on the Morton, he was assigned to class 13 of the destroyer department head school in Newport, Rhode Island. Upon graduation he was diverted from the destroyer forces to Coronado, California, to train in the new Swift class gunboats. Upon completion of training, he went to Manila in the Philippines, as officer in charge of a mobile training team which trained Philippine navy crews to use Swift boats against the pirates plaguing Manila Bay and the waters off Corregidor. From Manila, he went in-country Vietnam as officer in charge of PCF-39, based at the mouth of the main Mekong River channel that led to Saigon. After a year there, he was assigned as operations officer on the USS Hull which operated intermittently for the next two years off the coasts of North and South Vietnam providing naval gunfire support for Army and Marine forces.

=== College and return to the military ===
In 1968 Deutermann entered the University of Washington for two years, where he was awarded a master's degree in public administration and international law. He rejoined the Pacific Fleet in 1970 as operations officer of the USS Jouett. A month later, the ship went back to Vietnam, serving as the overall air warfare commander in the Gulf of Tonkin and also as a recovery ship for downed Navy and Air Force pilots. During this deployment the ship visited Japan, Hong Kong, Australia and the Philippines. In 1972 Deutermann entered the Naval War College in Newport, Rhode Island, for one year. He was then assigned to The Pentagon for three years, serving on a joint command and control computer integration project.

=== Return from shore duty ===
Following shore duty, Deutermann returned to sea, this time in the Atlantic Fleet as executive officer of the guided missile destroyer USS Charles F. Adams, which made two deployments to the Mediterranean over the following two years. He returned to the Pentagon in 1978 as a staff officer in the politico-military policy division of the Navy headquarters staff. He published his first book in 1980, a handbook for navy operations officers, through the Naval Institute Press in Annapolis, Maryland.

=== First command ===
In 1981 Deutermann assumed command of the guided missile destroyer USS Tattnall for a three-year tour of duty, which included combat operations off Lebanon. Following that assignment he was appointed the executive secretary to the Chief of Naval Operations for JCS matters in Washington, D.C. In late 1985, he assumed command of Destroyer Squadron 25, based in Pearl Harbor, Hawaii, for two years, during which he made one deployment to the Indian Ocean, where he visited Kenya, Pakistan, Singapore and Japan.

Upon conclusion of this tour Deutermann was assigned to the Royal College of Defence Studies (RCDS) in London, England, for one year. It was an international course studying the influence of military affairs on geopolitics, whose members represented forty different nations. In 1988 he returned to the Pentagon as head of the Strategy Planning branch of the Navy staff. He was then assigned as division director of the arms-control negotiations office concerned with chemical, biological, and radiation weapons on the Joint Chiefs of Staff. He was also appointed as a technical delegate to the United Nations, and participated in arms control negotiations with the Soviet Union in Geneva.

=== Retirement ===
Deutermann served for 26 years in the Navy, retiring in 1989. He earned 19 military awards and decorations. He then worked successively for three companies between 1989 and 1993, which supported the FAA in the procurement of large-scale computer systems.

=== Career as an author ===
After retiring from active duty, Deutermann moved to Georgia to work on his writing career. He published his first novel, entitled Scorpion in the Sea, in 1992 through the George Mason University Press. The book landed him an agent, and then a contract with St. Martin's Press in 1993. Three of his later books have been optioned for feature film development. Nightwalkers, was published May 26, 2009. In 2012, he was named the recipient of the W.Y. Boyd Literary Award for Excellence in Military Fiction by the American Library Association for his novel Pacific Glory.

In 2023 he was again honored by the American Library Association for his novel, Last Paladin, as recipient of the W.Y. Boyd Literary Award for Excellence in Military Fiction. He was honored a third time by the American Library Association in 2024 for the novel Iwo, 26 Charlie.

=== Other ventures ===
Since the late 1990s, Deutermann has served on the board of directors for two high-tech companies and on the board of advisors of the SpaceVest Venture Capital Group in Washington, D.C.

== Personal life ==
Deutermann married Susan Cornelia Degenhardt, of Gainesville, Florida in 1968. They presently live in Rockingham County, North Carolina, where they run a Dartmoor pony breeding farm. Their son Daniel retired after 20 years active duty in both the Navy and the Coast Guard in 2011. Daniel's previous assignments included being a flight instructor in Pensacola, Florida. Their daughter, Sarah, flew in Navy F-14 fighter jets, as a radar intercept officer (RIO). She is now an attorney in Greensboro, North Carolina. Deutermann's father, two of his uncles, as well as both of his brothers served in the armed forces, as have some of their children.

Deutermann's hobbies include the design and construction of formal gardens, reading American Civil War history, and the study of the 1st century Roman Near East.

== Bibliography ==
- The Ops Officers Manual (1980) ISBN 0-87021-505-1
- Scorpion in the Sea (1992) ISBN 0-312-95179-5 OCLC 29743498
- Edge of Honor (1994) ISBN 0-312-11051-0
- Official Privilege (1995) ISBN 0-312-95713-0
- Sweepers (1997) ISBN 0-312-15669-3
- Zero Option (1999) ISBN 0-312-19210-X
- Train Man (1999) ISBN 0-312-20375-6
- Hunting Season (2001) ISBN 0-312-97906-1
- Darkside (2002) ISBN 0-312-28120-X
- The Firefly (2003) ISBN 0-312-20377-2
- The Cat Dancers (2005) ISBN 0-312-33377-3
- Spider Mountain (2006) ISBN 0-312-33379-X
- The Moonpool (2008) ISBN 0-312-37159-4
- Nightwalkers (2009) ISBN 0-312-37241-8
- Pacific Glory (2011) ISBN 0-312-59944-7
- The Last Man (2012) ISBN 0-312-59945-5
- Ghosts of Bungo Suido (2013) ISBN 1-250-01802-1
- Sentinels of Fire (2014) ISBN 1-250-04118-X
- Cold Frame (2015) ISBN 9781250059338
- The Commodore (2016) ISBN 9781250078070
- Red Swan (2017) ISBN 9781250114082
- The Iceman (2018) ISBN 1-250-05933-X
- The Nugget (2019) ISBN 9781250205889
- The Hooligans (2020) ISBN 9781250263094
- Trial by Fire (2021) ISBN 9781250273048
- The Last Paladin (2022) ISBN 9781250279866
- Iwo, 26 Charlie. (2023) ISBN 9781250284990

== See also ==
- List of Bostonians
- List of crime writers
- List of mystery writers
- List of thriller writers
- List of United States Navy people
- List of University of Washington people
