= Walter Goodale Morrill =

Union Army officer in the American Civil War

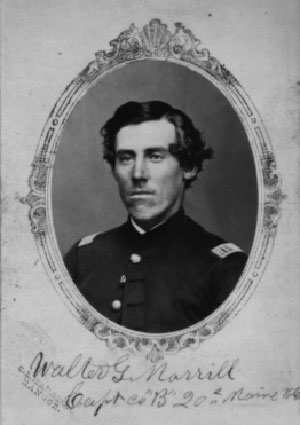
- Walter G. Morrill
- Born: November 13, 1840; Williamsburg, Maine, U.S.
- Died: March 3, 1935 (aged 94); Pittsfield, Maine, U.S.
- Burial place: Pittsfield Village Cemetery
- Military career
- Allegiance: United States of America
- Branch: United States Army; Union Army
- Service years: 1861–1865
- Rank: Lieutenant colonel
- Units: Company A, 6th Maine Volunteer Infantry Regiment; Company B, 20th Maine Volunteer Infantry Regiment
- Conflicts: American Civil War; Battle of Dranesville; Siege of Yorktown; Battle of Williamsburg; Battle of Seven Pines; Battle of Gaines' Mill; Battle of Malvern Hill; Second Battle of Bull Run; Battle of Antietam; Battle of Fredericksburg; Battle of Chancellorsville; Battle of Gettysburg; Second Battle of Rappahannock Station; Battle of Mine Run (WIA); Battle of the Wilderness (WIA); Battle of Spotsylvania Court House; Battle of North Anna; Second Battle of Petersburg; Battle of Globe Tavern; First Battle of Deep Bottom; Battle of Poplar Springs Church; Battle of Boydton Plank Road (WIA); Battle of Hatcher's Run; Battle of Gravelly Run; Battle of Five Forks; Battle of Appomattox Court House
- Awards: Medal of Honor

Walter Goodale Morrill (November 13, 1840 – March 3, 1935) was a Union Army officer in the American Civil War and a recipient of the U.S. military's highest decoration, the Medal of Honor, for his actions at the Second Battle of Rappahannock Station in November 1863. Also, Morrill's earlier actions in July 1863 at Gettysburg are considered essential for the famous Union victory on Little Round Top.

Morrill was raised in Williamsburg, Maine. In 1861 the age of 20, he enlisted as a sergeant in Company A, 6th Maine Volunteer Infantry Regiment. A year later he was commissioned as an officer in Company B, 20th Maine Volunteer Infantry Regiment. He was promoted several times, ultimately to lieutenant colonel. He mustered out on June 4, 1865. His Medal of Honor citation states:

The President of the United States of America, in the name of Congress, takes pleasure in presenting the Medal of Honor to Captain (Infantry) Walter Goodale Morrill, United States Army, for extraordinary heroism on 7 November 1863, while serving with Company B, 20th Maine Infantry, in action at Rappahannock Station, Virginia. Learning that an assault was to be made upon the enemy's works by other troops, Captain Morrill voluntarily joined the storming party with about 50 men of his regiment, and by his dash and gallantry rendered effective service in the assault.

The enemy's works were carried with bayonet, four guns, eight battle-flags, and 1,300 men were captured, and Captain Morrill was specially mentioned in the official reports of the Corps and Division commanders.

At the action of Little Round Top Morrill led his unit at the decisive point of the bayonet charge without orders. His contingent created the impression of two regiments rushing through the woods, though it consisted only of 44 Company B soldiers and 14 U.S. Sharpshooters. It was Morrill's group of Union soldiers that Confederate Lt. Col. (later Brig. Gen.) William C. Oates believed caused panic in his Confederate soldiers. Without Morrill's sudden assault from the Confederates' right, Joshua Chamberlain's famous bayonet attack, often credited for saving Little Round Top and Gettysburg from defeat, probably would have been spoiled and pushed back by Oates men.

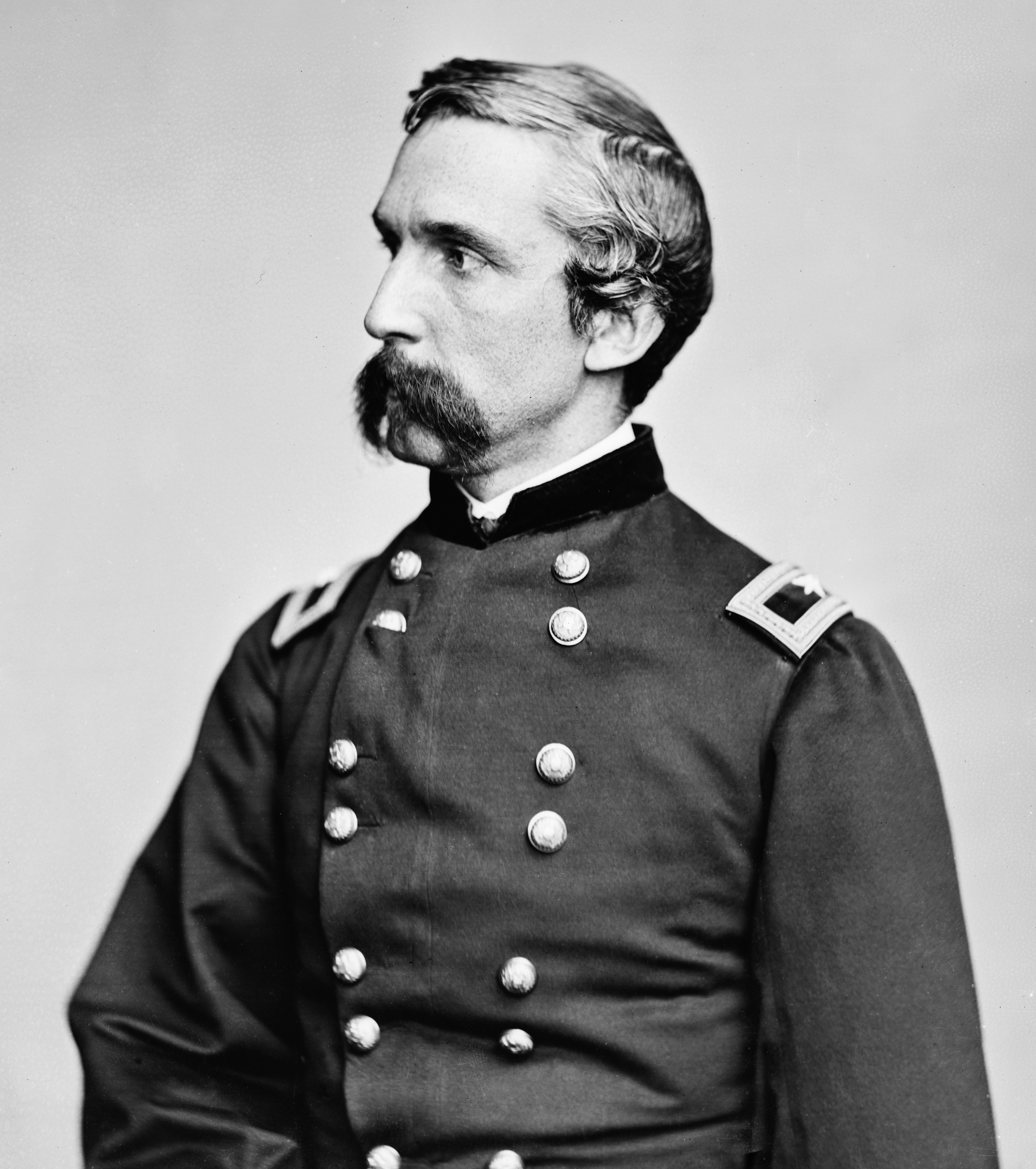
Joshua Lawrence Chamberlain ordered the bayonet charge on Little Round Top.

During their retreat, the Confederates were subjected to a volley of rifle fire from Company B of the 20th Maine, commanded by Morrill, and a few of the 2nd U.S. Sharpshooters, who had been placed by Chamberlain behind a stone wall 150 yards to the east, hoping to guard against an envelopment. This group, who had been hidden from sight, caused considerable confusion in the Confederate ranks.

Of Little Round Top, Brig. Gen. Oates said,

His [Col. Chamberlain's] skill and persistency and the great bravery of his men saved Little Round Top and the Army of the Potomac from defeat. [If one more Confederate regiment had stormed the far left of the Army of the Potomac with the 15th Alabama,] "... we would have completely turned the flank and have won Little Round Top, which would have forced Meade's whole left wing to retire." Oates concluded that "great events sometimes turn on comparatively small affairs."

From Colonel Chamberlain's after action report:: "Captain Morrill with his skirmishers (send out from my left flank), with some dozen or fifteen of the U.S. Sharpshooters who had put themselves under his (Morrill's) direction, fell upon the enemy as they were breaking, and by his demonstrations, as well as his well-directed fire, added much to the effect of the [bayonet] charge ... that cleared the front of nearly our entire brigade."

Morrill became a prominent businessman in Pittsfield, Maine after the war.
