= Abner O. Shaw =

American physician (1837–1934)

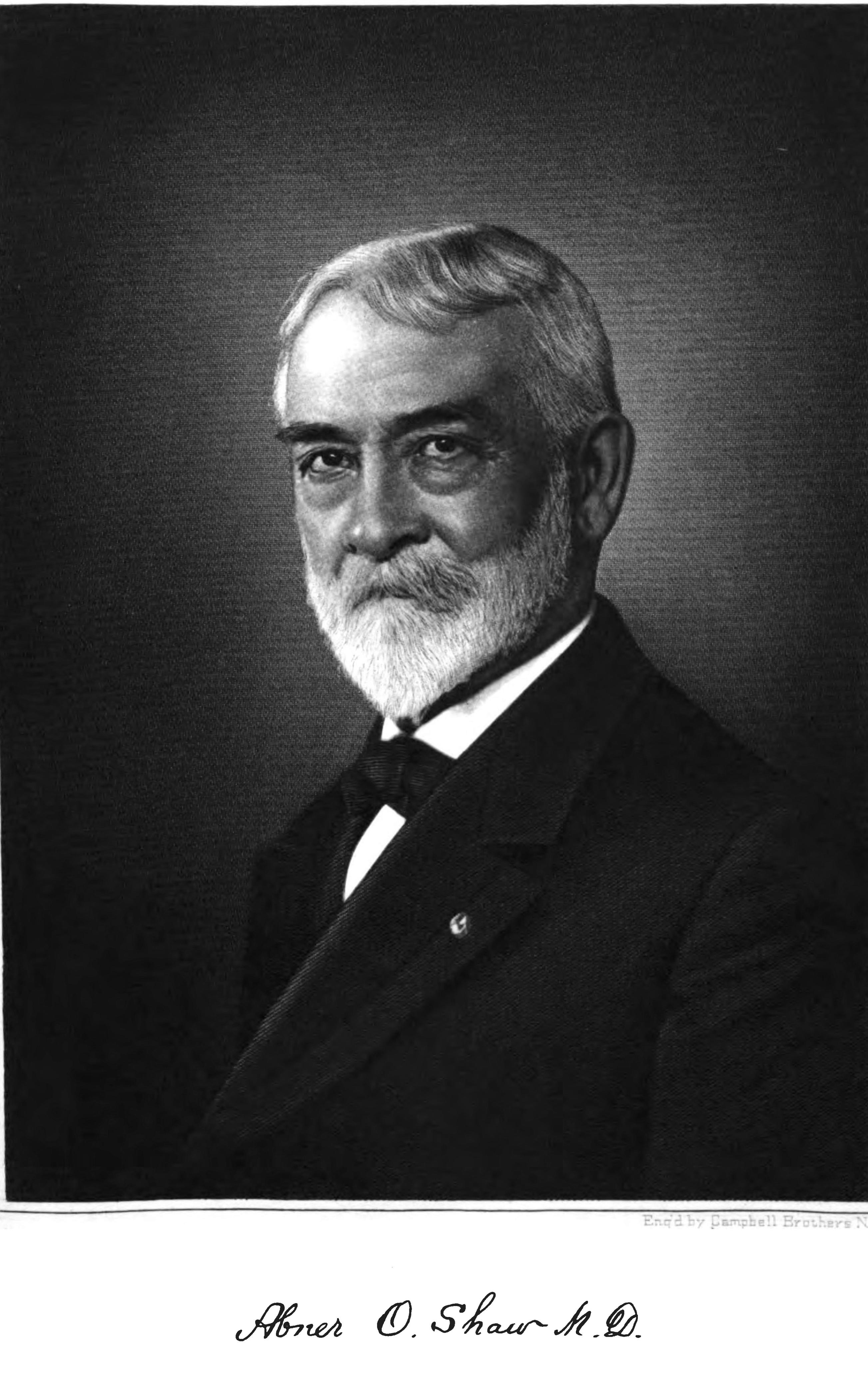

Personal details
- Born: Abner Orimel Shaw; February 16, 1837 Readfield, Maine
- Died: January 27, 1934 (aged 96) Portland, Maine
- Resting place: Evergreen Cemetery (Portland, Maine)
- Party: Republican
- Spouse: Elizabeth Sanford
- Education: College of Physicians and Surgeons
- Profession: Surgeon, Doctor

Military service
- Allegiance: United States of America; Union
- Branch/service: United States Army; Union Army
- Years of service: 1862–65
- Rank: Private; Assistant Surgeon; Surgeon
- Unit: 7th New York Militia; 20th Maine Infantry
- Battles/wars: American Civil War: Battle of the Wilderness; Second Battle of Petersburg; Weldon Railroad; Peeble's Farm; Hatcher's Run

Abner Ormiel Shaw (February 16, 1837 – January 27, 1934) was an American physician from Maine who served in the Civil War with the 20th Maine Volunteer Infantry Regiment.

== Early life ==
Abner Orimel Shaw was born on February 16, 1837, to Eaton Shaw and Mary Roberts in Readfield, Maine. He was the son of a Methodist minister whose ancestors came to America on the Mayflower. Upon reaching adulthood Shaw set out for New York City where he entered the College of Physicians and Surgeons intent on realizing his childhood dream of becoming a doctor.

== Civil War ==
While studying to become a Doctor in New York the Civil War broke out and Shaw broke off his medical study to enlist, serving in the 7th New York Militia as a foot soldier. Getting leave to return to school, Shaw graduated in 1863 and was soon assigned to the 20th Maine Volunteer Infantry Regiment as assistant surgeon.

The famous regiment had just won many laurels at the Battle of Gettysburg but had done so without a surgeon with them. The newly arrived Shaw soon had his hands full when the regiment's colonel Joshua L. Chamberlain lost consciousness after ignoring early warning signs of malarial fever. Chamberlain was apparently impressed with their new Assistant Surgeon for he wrote to the governor requesting that Shaw be made full Surgeon rather than bringing in a new Surgeon who would then out rank him.

Governor, I have the honor to acknowledge the receipt of your favor of the 12th instant in reference to the appointment of surgeon of the 20th Maine Vols. I have consulted with the officers of the 20th, and find that they would prefer (so far as I can discover) Dr. Shaw our present assistant surgeon, to any other person except, perhaps, Dr. Martin. I have not the slightest objection to Dr. Wescott, but I believe the Regiment would be better pleased with Dr. Shaw. He deserves promotion I think, although he has been with us but a short time....

— Through Blood and Fire

And then a month later in another note to the Governor he added "Dr. Shaw is giving the best of satisfaction – few surgeons within my observation have been so faithful and have won the general good will of the Brigade, to the degree he has."

Shaw received the promotion and served with the regiment through the Battle of the Wilderness where Captain Walter Goodale Morrill was shot in the face by a minie ball and was carried from the field blinded by his own blood, Lieutenant Holman Melcher was wounded and Captain William W. Morrell was mortally wounded.

On June 18, 1864, in the first days of the Siege of Petersburg after a full day's work tending the wounded of his regiment Shaw learned that Chamberlain, who had been placed in command of another brigade in the division, had been wounded during an ill-fated charge and was believed to be dying. Shaw lost no time in finding his former commander. The doctors of that brigade who had already examined Chamberlain discovered that the bullet passed from hip to hip through his body and through his bladder. At the time this wound would be considered "mortal" due to the fact that it involved the bladder but also most wounds to the hips were fatal due to loss of blood from several main arteries. The Third Brigade's former commander Strong Vincent had died at Gettysburg of a very similar wound. It is not surprising that Chamberlain's doctors were quick to declare the wound fatal and set him aside.

Chamberlain describes that while lying on the ground awaiting death...

I looked up and saw dear, faithful Doctor Shaw, Surgeon of my own regiment [the 20th Maine] lying a mile away. My brother Tom had brought him. He and good Dr. Townsend sat down by me and tried to use some instrument to establish proper connection to stop the terrible extravasations which would end my life. All others had given it up, and me too. But these two faithful men bent over their task trying with vain effort to find the entrance to torn and clogged and distorted passages of vital currents. Toiling and returning to the ever impossible task, the able surgeon undertaking to aid Dr. Shaw said, sadly, "It is of no use, Doctor; he cannot be saved. I have done all possible for the man. Let us go, and not torture him longer." "Just once more, Doctor; let me try just this once more, and I will give it up." Bending to his task, by a sudden miracle, he touched the exact lost thread; the thing was done.

— Chamberlain at Petersburg

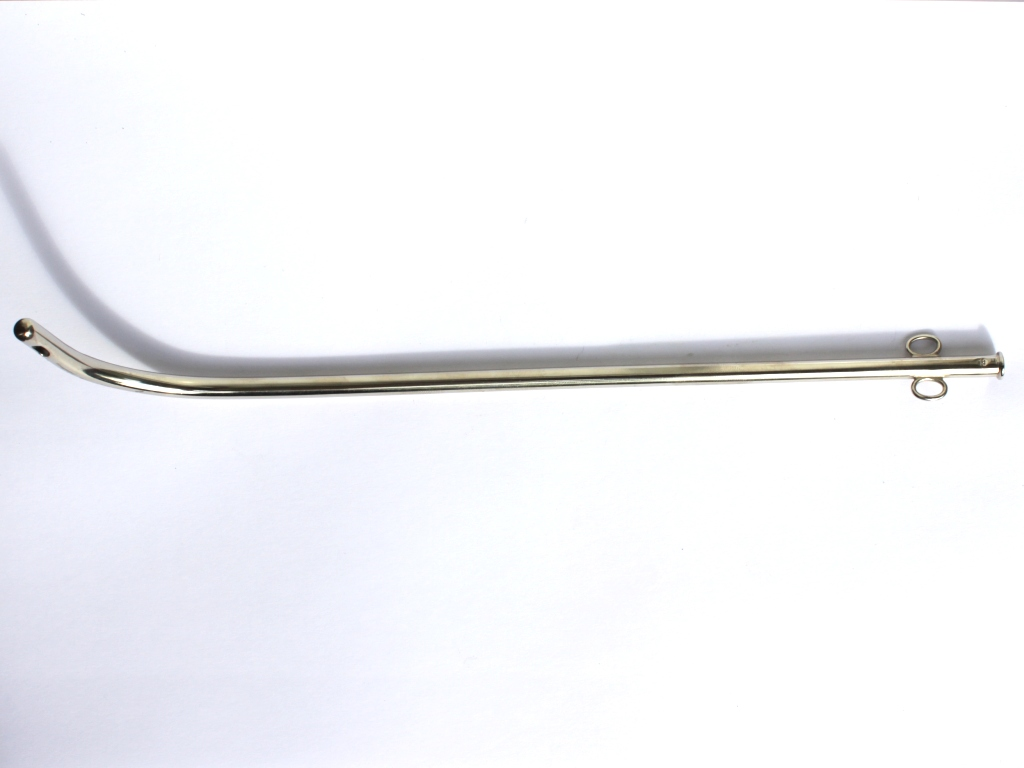
Male metal catheter

Using a metal catheter much like the one seen at right, Shaw was able to get most of the urine to drain from its normal course rather than out through the wound, with that in place Shaw was then able to slow bleeding enough by locating and tying off major arteries that Chamberlain not only survived the night, but he lived for another 50 years before infection of the same wound finally killed him in 1914.

Shaw went on to serve in the battles of Weldon Railroad, Peeble's Farm and Hatcher's Run. He was appointed acting Brigade Surgeon December 1, 1864, after Dr Townsend, the previous chief was mustered out with his regiment the 44th New York. Shaw resigned February 22, 1865, after developing malaria.

== Post-war career ==
After the war Shaw returned home to Maine and married Elizabeth Sanford. He set up a successful medical practice in the town of Portland practicing medicine well into his later years.

Dr. Shaw attended many army reunions throughout the rest of his life and kept in contact with many members of the 20th Maine. At the turn of the century Shaw was able to renew and deepen his relationship with Chamberlain when Chamberlain moved to Portland. In 1914 Dr. Shaw attended General Chamberlain on his deathbed and was named a pall bearer at the General's funeral. Shaw co-authored a eulogy for the General that was released later that year by the Military Order of the Loyal Legion.

The following is an excerpt from "History of Maine" that was published while the Doctor was still living in 1919:

Dr Shaw was united in marriage in New York City with Elizabeth Sanford a native of New York a daughter of Nichol Sanford a prominent merchant of this city To Dr and Mrs Shaw four children were born as follows: Louisa, who died in the year 1870, when only three years of age; Edward A now treasurer of the firm, Loring Short & Harmon, married Carrie Starr Harmon, by whom he has two children, Elizabeth and Alice; Herbert who died at the age of ten years and Florence M who became the wife of Frank H Bradford, of Portland Maine, and the mother of one child Dura Shaw Bradford.

— Maine: A History

Shaw died of pneumonia at the age of ninety-six at his Bowdoin Street home in Portland, Maine's West End on January 27, 1934.

He is buried in his family's mausoleum in Evergreen Cemetery in Portland, Maine.

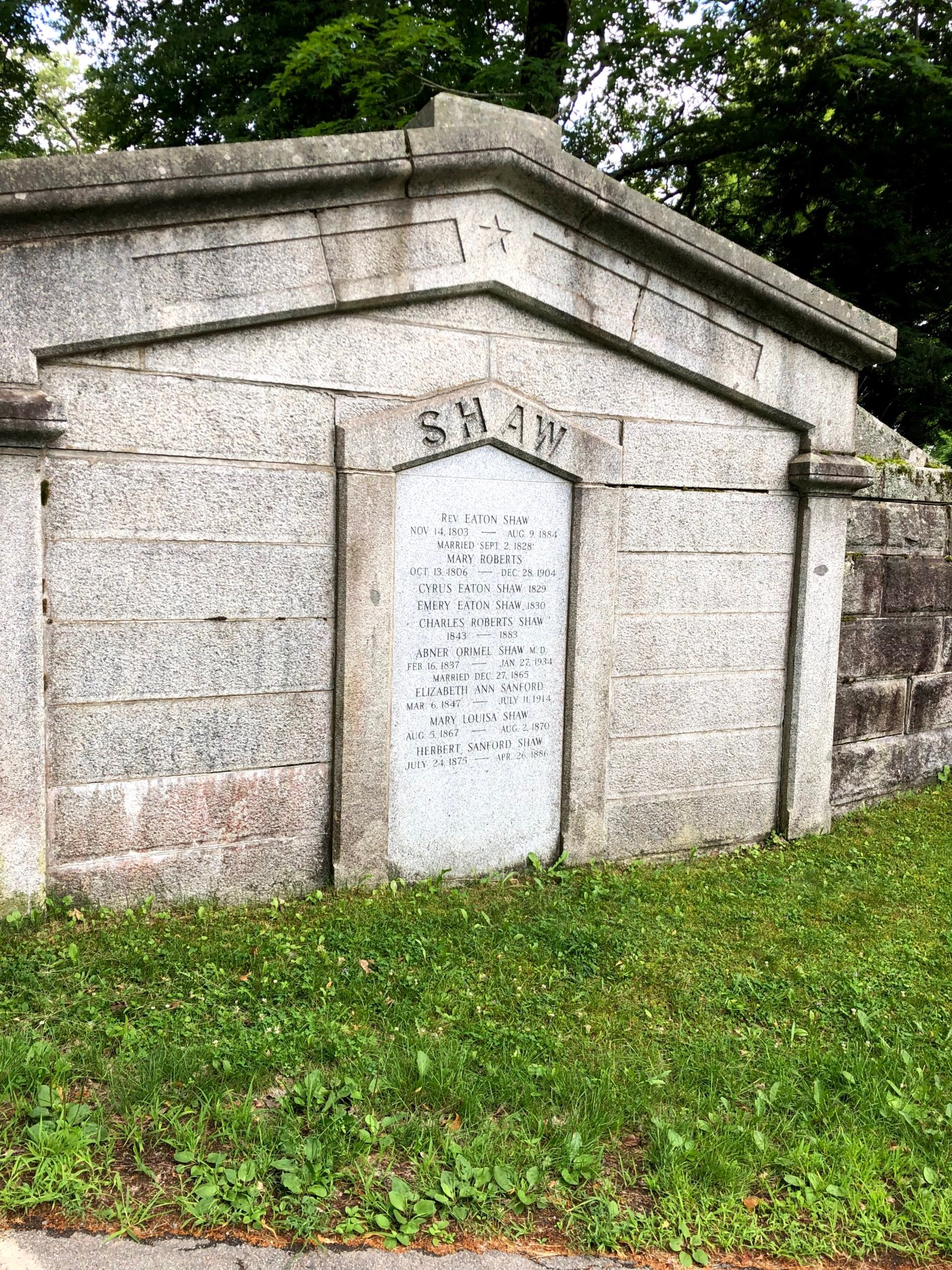
Tomb of the Shaw family in Evergreen Cemetery, Portland, Maine.
