= Joshua Chamberlain =

Union Army general and Medal of Honor recipient

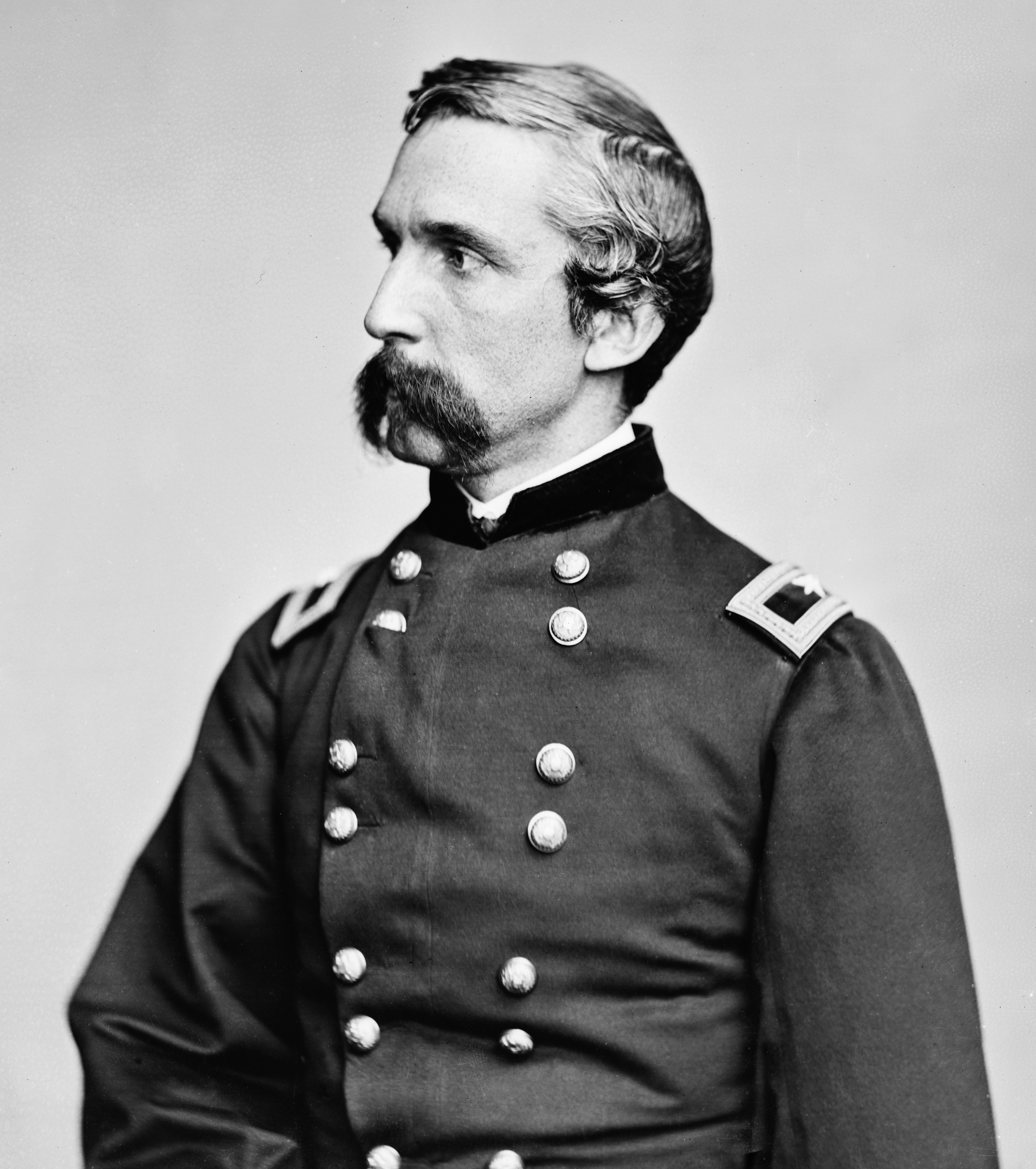
- Chamberlain in the 1860s

32nd Governor of Maine
- In office January 2, 1867 – January 4, 1871
- Preceded by: Samuel Cony
- Succeeded by: Sidney Perham

6th President of Bowdoin College
- In office 1871–1883
- Preceded by: Samuel Harris
- Succeeded by: William De Witt Hyde

Personal details
- Born: Lawrence Joshua Chamberlain; September 8, 1828 Brewer, Maine, U.S.
- Died: February 24, 1914 (aged 85) Portland, Maine, U.S.
- Resting place: Pine Grove Cemetery, Brunswick, Maine, U.S.
- Party: Republican
- Spouse: Fanny Chamberlain (m. 1855; died 1905)
- Children: 5
- Education: Bowdoin College
- Profession: Professor, Soldier
- Nickname(s): "Lion of the Round Top" "Bloody Chamberlain"

Military service
- Allegiance: United States (Union)
- Branch/service: United States Army
- Years of service: 1862–1866
- Rank: Brigadier General; Brevet Major General
- Commands: 20th Regiment Maine Volunteer Infantry; 3rd Brigade, 1st Division, V Corps; 1st Brigade, 1st Division, V Corps; 1st Division, V Corps
- Battles/wars: American Civil War; Battle of Fredericksburg; Battle of Gettysburg; Little Round Top; Battle of Cold Harbor; Second Battle of Petersburg (WIA); Appomattox Campaign; Battle of White Oak Road; Battle of Five Forks
- Awards: Medal of Honor

Joshua Lawrence Chamberlain (born Lawrence Joshua Chamberlain, September 8, 1828 – February 24, 1914) was an American college professor and politician from Maine who volunteered during the American Civil War to join the Union Army. He became a highly respected and decorated Union officer, reaching the rank of brigadier general (and brevet major general). He is best known for his gallantry at the Battle of Gettysburg, leading a bayonet charge, for which he was awarded the Medal of Honor.

Chamberlain was commissioned a lieutenant colonel in the 20th Maine Volunteer Infantry Regiment in 1862, and fought at the Battle of Fredericksburg. He became commander of the regiment in June 1863 when losses at the Battle of Chancellorsville elevated the original commander, Colonel Adelbert Ames, to brigade command. During the second day's fighting at Gettysburg on July 2, Chamberlain's regiment occupied the extreme left of the Union lines at Little Round Top. Chamberlain's men withstood repeated assaults from the 15th Alabama Infantry Regiment and finally drove the Confederates away with a downhill bayonet charge. Chamberlain was severely wounded while commanding a brigade during the Second Battle of Petersburg in June 1864, and was given what was intended to be a deathbed promotion to brigadier general. In April 1865, he fought at the Battle of Five Forks and was given the honor of commanding the Union troops at the surrender ceremony for the infantry of Robert E. Lee's Army at Appomattox Court House, Virginia.

After the war, he entered politics as a Republican and served four one-year terms of office as the 32nd governor of Maine from 1867 to 1871. After leaving office, he returned to his alma mater, Bowdoin College, serving as its president until 1883. He died in 1914 at age 85 due to complications from the wound that he received at Petersburg.

== Early life and education ==
Chamberlain was born in Brewer, Maine, the son of Sarah Dupee (née Brastow) and Joshua Chamberlain, on September 8, 1828. Chamberlain was of English ancestry and his family could be traced back to twelfth-century England, during the reign of King Stephen. Chamberlain's great-grandfather Ebenezer, was a New Hampshire soldier in the French and Indian War, and the American Revolutionary War. Chamberlain's grandfather, Joshua, was a ship builder and colonel during the War of 1812, notably involved at the Battle of Hampden, before moving his family to a Brewer farm in 1817. Chamberlain's father Joshua served as a lieutenant colonel in the Aroostook War.

Chamberlain was the first of five children. His father named him after James Lawrence, and favored a military career for his son, while Chamberlain's mother wanted him to become a minister. Chamberlain became a member of the Congregational Church in Brewer in the mid-1840s, and attended Major Whiting's military academy in Ellsworth. Chamberlain then taught himself Greek so he could be admitted to Bowdoin College in 1848. At college, Chamberlain was a member of the Peucinian Society, Phi Beta Kappa, and the Alpha Delta Phi fraternity. He taught Sunday school in Brunswick during his freshman and sophomore years, and led the choir at the Congregational Church-First Parish Church during his Junior and Senior years. Chamberlain graduated in 1852, then entered the Bangor Theological Seminary for three years of study. He remained a Calvinist and a conservative Congregationalist throughout his life. Besides studying Latin, German, history and grammar, Chamberlain mastered French, Arabic, Hebrew and Syriac.

On December 7, 1855, Chamberlain married Fanny Adams, cousin and adopted daughter of a local clergyman. Their first child was a girl named Grace Dupee, born on October 16, 1856. Their son Harold Wylls was born on October 10, 1858. A second and fourth child died early. In the fall of 1855, Chamberlain returned to Bowdoin, and began a career in education, first as an instructor in logic and natural theology, then as professor of rhetoric and oratory. He eventually went on to teach every subject in the curriculum with the exception of science and mathematics. In 1861 he was appointed professor of modern languages, which he held until 1865.

== American Civil War ==
=== Early career ===
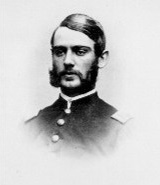
Chamberlain's younger brother, Thomas, who was the Lieutenant Colonel of the 20th Maine (1864; age 23)

At the beginning of the American Civil War, Chamberlain believed the Union needed to be supported against the Confederacy by all those willing. On several occasions, Chamberlain spoke freely of his beliefs during his class, urging students to follow their hearts in regards to the war while maintaining that the cause was just. Of his desire to serve in the War, he wrote to Maine's Governor Israel Washburn, Jr., "I fear, this war, so costly of blood and treasure, will not cease until men of the North are willing to leave good positions, and sacrifice the dearest personal interests, to rescue our country from desolation, and defend the national existence against treachery." Many faculty at Bowdoin did not feel his enthusiasm for various reasons and Chamberlain was subsequently granted a leave of absence (supposedly to study languages for two years in Europe). He then promptly enlisted unbeknownst to his family and those at Bowdoin. Offered the colonelcy of the 20th Maine Regiment, he declined, according to his biographer, John J. Pullen, preferring to "start a little lower and learn the business first." He was appointed lieutenant colonel of the regiment on August 8, 1862, under the command of Col. Adelbert Ames. The 20th was assigned to the 3rd Brigade, 1st Division, V Corps in the Union Army of the Potomac. One of Chamberlain's younger brothers, Thomas Chamberlain, was also an officer of the 20th Maine, and another, John Chamberlain, visited the regiment at Gettysburg as a member of the U.S. Christian Commission until appointed as a chaplain in another Maine Volunteer regiment.

The 20th Maine fought at the Battle of Fredericksburg, suffering relatively small numbers of casualties in the assaults on Marye's Heights, but were forced to spend a miserable night on the freezing battlefield among the many wounded from other regiments. Chamberlain chronicled this night well in his diary and went to great length discussing his having to use bodies of the fallen for shelter and a pillow while listening to the bullets zip into the corpses.

The 20th missed the Battle of Chancellorsville in May 1863 due to an outbreak of smallpox in their ranks (which was caused by an errant smallpox vaccine), keeping them on guard duty in the rear. Chamberlain was promoted to colonel of the regiment in June 1863 upon the promotion of Ames.

==== Battle of Gettysburg ====
Chamberlain's position on Little Round Top

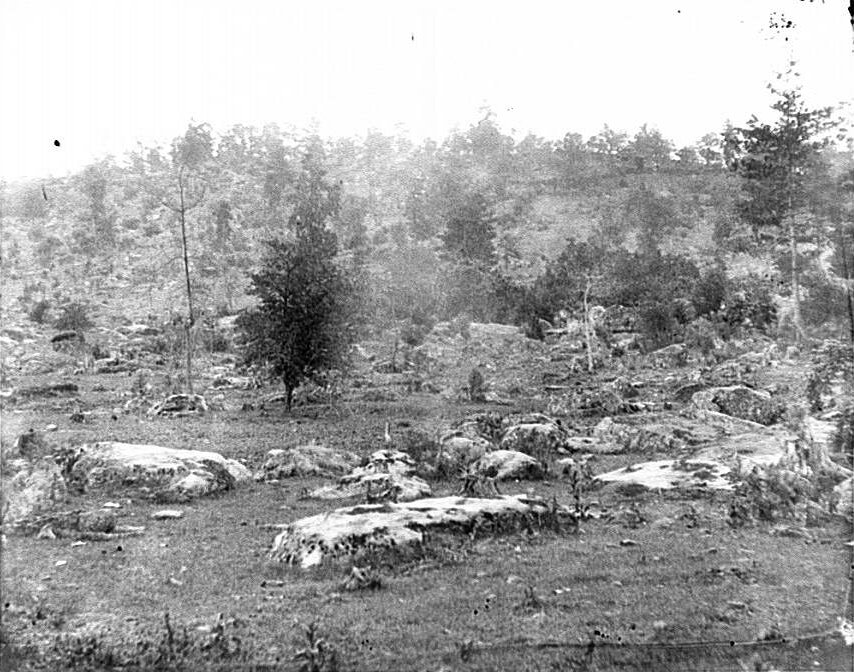
Little Round Top, western slope, photographed by Timothy H. O'Sullivan (1863)

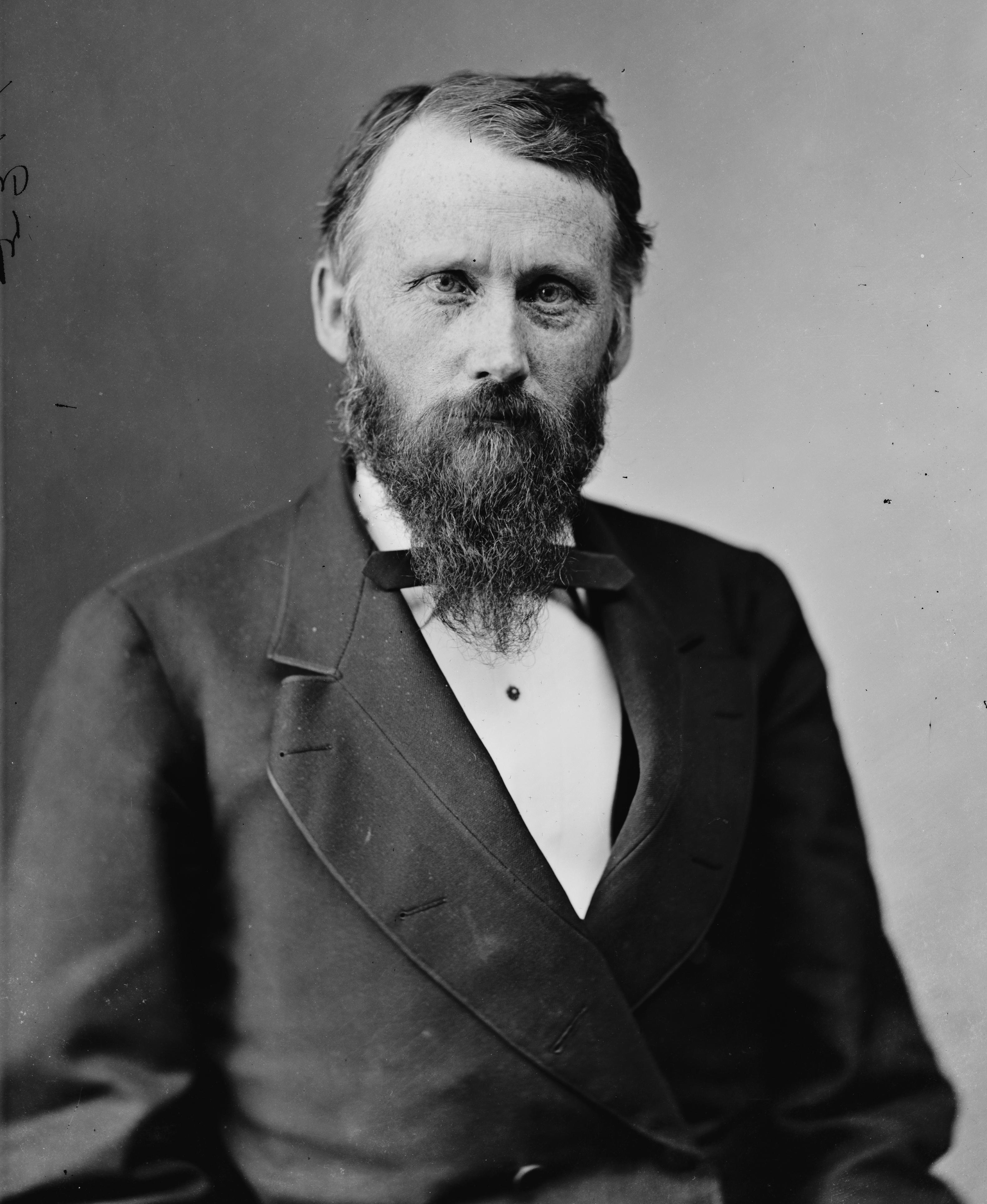
Capt. Ellis Spear, Chamberlain's "right-hand man" on Little Round Top

Chamberlain became most famous for his achievements during the Battle of Gettysburg. On July 2, the second day of the battle, Union forces were recovering from initial setbacks and hastily regrouping into defensive positions on a line of hills south of the town. Sensing the momentary vulnerability of the Union forces, the Confederates began an attack against the Union left flank. Chamberlain's brigade, commanded by Col. Strong Vincent, was sent to defend Little Round Top by the army's Chief of Engineers, Brig. Gen. Gouverneur K. Warren. Chamberlain found himself and the 20th Maine at the far left end of the entire Union line. He quickly understood the strategic significance of the small hill, and the need to hold the Union left at all costs. The men from Maine waited until troops from the 15th Alabama Infantry Regiment, commanded by Col. William C. Oates, charged up the hill, attempting to flank the Union position. Time and time again the Confederates struck, until the 20th Maine was almost doubled back upon itself. With many casualties and ammunition running low, Col. Chamberlain recognized the dire circumstances and ordered his left wing (which was now looking southeast, compared to the rest of the regiment, which was facing west) to initiate a bayonet charge. From his report of the day: "At that crisis, I ordered the bayonet. The word was enough." While battlefield conditions make it unlikely that many men heard Chamberlain's order, most historians believe he initiated the charge.

The 20th Maine charged down the hill, with the left wing wheeling continually to make the charging line swing like a hinge, thus creating a simultaneous frontal assault and flanking maneuver, capturing 101 of the Confederate soldiers and successfully saving the flank. This action was popularized by the book The Killer Angels and the movie Gettysburg. Chamberlain sustained one slight wound in the battle, when a shot hit his scabbard and bruised his thigh. After initiating the maneuver, he came upon a Confederate officer wielding a revolver who quickly fired, narrowly missing his face. Chamberlain remained steadfast, and with his sword at the officer's throat accepted the man's arms and surrender. The pistol Chamberlain captured at Gettysburg can still be seen on display in the Civil War exhibit of the Maine State Museum. For his tenacity at defending Little Round Top, he was known by the sobriquet Lion of the Round Top.

For his actions that day, Chamberlain was awarded the Medal of Honor.

===== Medal of Honor citation =====
The President of the United States of America, in the name of Congress, takes pleasure in presenting the Medal of Honor to Colonel Joshua Lawrence Chamberlain, United States Army, for extraordinary heroism on 2 July 1863, while serving with 20th Maine Infantry, in action at Gettysburg, Pennsylvania, for daring heroism and great tenacity in holding his position on the Little Round Top against repeated assaults, and carrying the advance position on the Great Round Top.

==== Bristoe campaign ====
Chamberlain led the 20th Maine during the Bristoe campaign of October and November 1863. In November he became ill with malaria and was suspended from active duty in order to recover at home.

==== Siege of Petersburg ====
In April 1864, Chamberlain returned to the Army of the Potomac for the Overland Campaign. In June 1864, he was promoted to brigade commander shortly before the Siege of Petersburg and given command of the 1st Brigade, First Division, V Corps. In a major action on June 18, during the Second Battle of Petersburg, Chamberlain was shot through the right hip and groin, the bullet exiting his left hip. Despite the injury, Chamberlain drew his sword and stuck it into the ground in order to keep himself upright to counter the growing resolve among his men for retreat. He stood upright for several minutes until he collapsed and lay unconscious from loss of blood. The wound was considered mortal by the division's surgeon; Chamberlain's incorrectly recorded death in battle was reported in the Maine newspapers, and Lt. Gen. Ulysses S. Grant gave Chamberlain a battlefield promotion to the rank of brigadier general after receiving an urgent recommendation on June 19 from corps commander Maj. Gen. Gouverneur K. Warren: "He has been recommended for promotion for gallant and efficient conduct on previous occasion and yesterday led his brigade against the enemy under most destructive fire. He expresses the wish that he may receive the recognition of his services by promotion before he dies for the gratification of his family and friends."

The wound was extremely complex, as Chamberlain was shot through the both hips and the bladder. This was why the wound was initially thought to be mortal. Chamberlain's life was saved only through the significant efforts of the 20th Maine's surgeon, Abner O. Shaw, who placed a metal catheter to drain the bladder before he was able to stop the bleeding. He lived for another 50 years before infection of the same wound finally led to his death in 1914. With the support of his brother Tom, Chamberlain was back in command by November. Although many, including his wife Fanny, urged Chamberlain to resign, he was determined to serve through the end of the war.

In early 1865, Chamberlain regained command of the 1st Brigade of the 1st Division of V Corps, and he continued to act with courage and resolve. On March 29, 1865, his brigade participated in a major skirmish on the Quaker Road during Grant's final advance that would finish the war. Despite losses, another wound (in the left arm and chest that almost caused amputation), and nearly being captured, Chamberlain was successful and brevetted to the rank of major general by President Abraham Lincoln. Chamberlain gained the name "Bloody Chamberlain" at Quaker Road. Chamberlain kept a Bible and framed picture of his wife in his left front chest pocket. When a Confederate shot at Chamberlain, the bullet went through his horse's neck, hit the picture frame, entered under Chamberlain's skin in the front of his chest, traveled around his body under the skin along the rib, and exited his back. To all observers, Union and Confederate, it appeared that he was shot through his chest. He continued to encourage his men to attack.

==== Appomattox ====
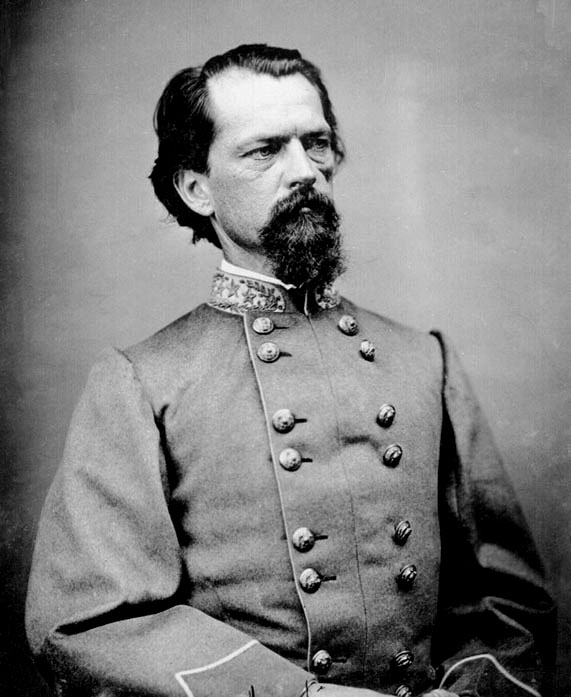
Confederate General John B. Gordon was assigned the task to surrender all arms to Gen. Chamberlain.

On the morning of April 9, 1865, Chamberlain learned of the desire by General Robert E. Lee to surrender the Army of Northern Virginia when a Confederate staff officer approached him under a flag of truce. "Sir," he reported to Chamberlain, "I am from General Gordon. General Lee desires a cessation of hostilities until he can hear from General Grant as to the proposed surrender." The next day, Chamberlain was summoned to Union headquarters where Maj. Gen. Charles Griffin informed him that he had been selected to preside over the parade of the Confederate infantry as part of their formal surrender at Appomattox Court House on April 12.

Chamberlain was thus responsible for one of the most poignant scenes of the American Civil War. As the Confederate soldiers marched down the road to surrender their arms and colors, Chamberlain, on his own initiative, ordered his men to come to attention and "carry arms" as a show of respect. In memoirs written forty years after the event, Chamberlain described what happened next:

Gordon, at the head of the marching column, outdoes us in courtesy. He was riding with downcast eyes and more than pensive look; but at this clatter of arms he raises his eyes and instantly catching the significance, wheels his horse with that superb grace of which he is master, drops the point of his sword to his stirrup, gives a command, at which the great Confederate ensign following him is dipped and his decimated brigades, as they reach our right, respond to the 'carry.' All the while on our part not a sound of trumpet or drum, not a cheer, nor a word nor motion of man, but awful stillness as if it were the passing of the dead.

Chamberlain stated that his salute to the Confederate soldiers was unpopular with many Unionists, but he defended his action in his posthumously published 1915 memoir The Passing of the Armies. Gordon, in his own memoirs, called Chamberlain "one of the knightliest soldiers of the Federal Army." Arguing that Gordon never mentioned the anecdote until after he read Chamberlain's account more than 40 years later, at least one writer has questioned the historicity of Chamberlain and Gordon's account (e.g., S.C. Gwynne, Hymns of the Republic: The Story of the Final Year of the American Civil War (p. 298)), but eminent historians such as James McPherson believe that the events in question occurred as Chamberlain described (e.g., James McPherson, Battle Cry of Freedom (p. 850)).

In all, Chamberlain served in 20 battles and numerous skirmishes, was cited for bravery four times, had six horses shot from under him, and was wounded six times.

== Post-war service ==
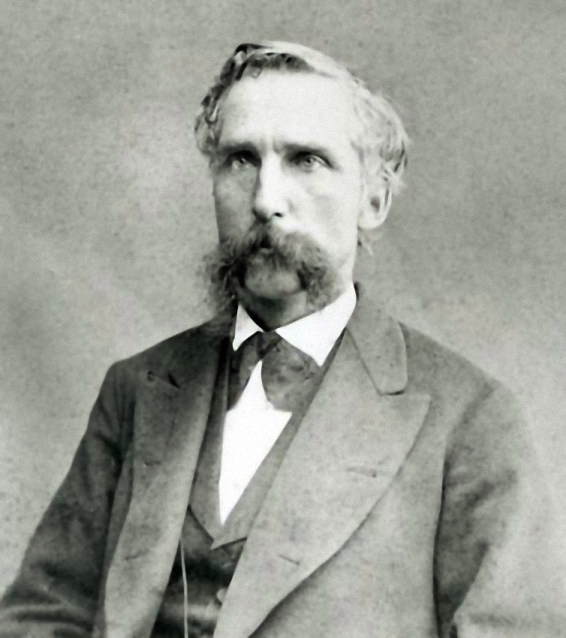
Chamberlain as the Governor of Maine

Chamberlain left the U.S. Army soon after the war ended, going back to his home state of Maine. Due to his immense popularity, he served as Governor of Maine for four one-year terms after he won election as a Republican. His victory in 1866 set the record for the most votes and the highest percentage for any Maine governor by that time. He would break his own record in 1868. During his time in office, he was attacked by those angered by his support for capital punishment and by his refusal to create a special police force to enforce the prohibition of alcohol.

1866 Maine Governor Election
Party	Candidate	Votes	%
Republican	Joshua Chamberlain	69,637	62.4
Democratic	Eben F. Pillsbury	41,947	37.6

1867 Maine Governor Election
Party	Candidate	Votes	%
Republican	Joshua Chamberlain	57,322	55.5
Democratic	Eben F. Pillsbury	45,990	44.5

1868 Maine Governor Election
Party	Candidate	Votes	%
Republican	Joshua Chamberlain	75,523	72.1
Democratic	Eben F. Pillsbury	29,264	27.9

1869 Maine Governor Election
Party	Candidate	Votes	%
Republican	Joshua Chamberlain	54,314	55.4
Democratic	Franklin Smith	39,033	39.8
Prohibition	Nathan Griffin Hichborn	4,736	4.8

In January 1880, there was a dispute about who was the newly elected governor of Maine, and the Maine State House was occupied by a band of armed men. The outgoing governor, Alonzo Garcelon, summoned Chamberlain, the commander of the Maine Militia, to take charge. Chamberlain sent home the armed men, and arranged for the Augusta police to keep control. He stayed in the State House most of the twelve-day period until the Maine Supreme Judicial Court's decision on the election results was known. During this time, there were threats of assassination and kidnapping, and on one occasion, he went outside to face down a crowd of 25–30 men intending to kill him, and both sides offered bribes to appoint him a United States senator. Having gratified neither side in the dispute, he did not become a senator, and his career in state politics ended.

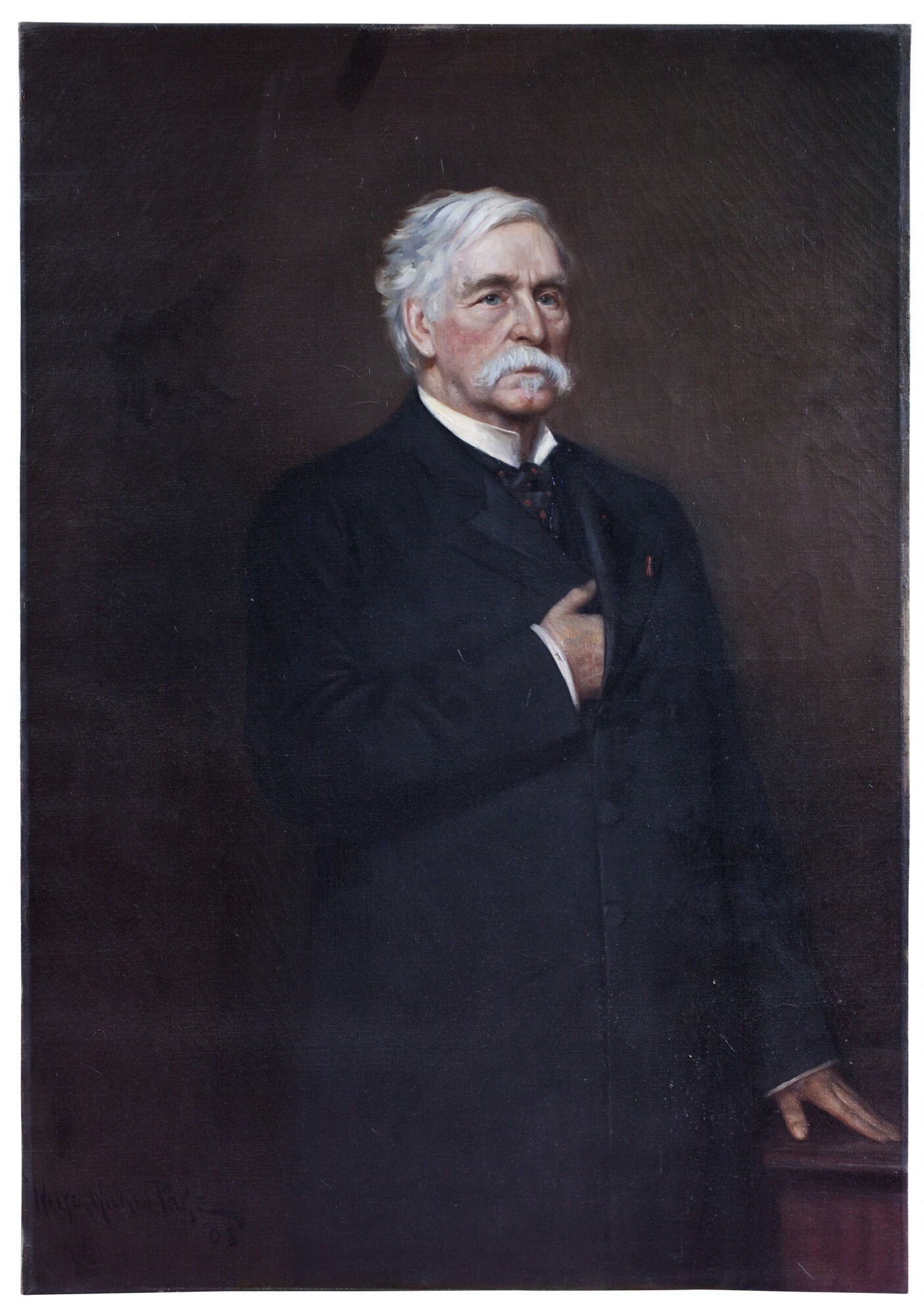
Chamberlain's official portrait as President of Bowdoin College

After leaving political office, he returned to Bowdoin College. He was originally offered the presidency of the new state university in Orono, but declined, hoping for the same position at his alma mater. That came in 1871, when he was appointed president of Bowdoin and remained in that position until 1883, when he was forced to resign because of ill health from his war wounds. He also served as an ex-officio trustee of nearby Bates College from 1867 to 1871.

== Later life ==
After resigning from Bowdoin in 1883, he went to New York City to practice law. Chamberlain served as Surveyor of the Port of Portland, Maine, a federal appointment, and engaged in business activities, including real estate dealings in Florida (1885) and a college of art in New York, as well as hotels. He traveled to the West Coast to work on railroad building and public improvements. From the time of his serious wound in 1864 until his death, he was forced to wear an early form of a catheter with a bag and underwent six operations to try to correct the original wound and stop the fevers and infections that plagued him, without success.

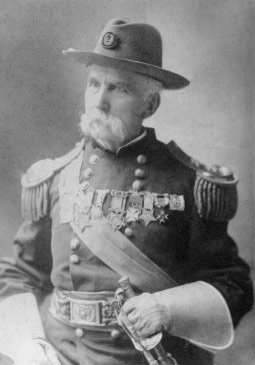
Chamberlain later in life in Portland, wearing uniform and his medals

In 1893, 30 years after the battle that made the 20th Maine famous, Chamberlain was awarded the Medal of Honor for his actions at Gettysburg. The citation commends him for his "Daring heroism and great tenacity in holding his position on the Little Round Top against repeated assaults, and carrying the advance position on the Great Round Top." As in many other Civil War actions, controversy arose when one of his subordinate officers stated that Chamberlain never actually ordered a charge at Gettysburg. The claim never seriously affected Chamberlain's fame or notability, however. This original medal was lost, and later rediscovered in 2013, and donated to the Pejepscot Historical Society in Brunswick, Maine. A second, redesigned medal issued in 1904 is currently housed at Bowdoin College.

In 1898, Chamberlain, at the age of 70, volunteered to command US Army forces in the Spanish American War. Despite the support of Acting Secretary of War Russell Alger and President William McKinley, he was passed over due to health issues. Ironically, his principal opponent at Gettysburg, William C. Oates, was appointed in his place as a Brigadier General of US Volunteers.

Chamberlain purchased Crow Island in 1901, which was within view of his Donhegan estate on Casco Bay in Brunswick.

In 1905, Chamberlain became a founding member of the Maine Institution for the Blind, in Portland, now called The Iris Network. Chamberlain's wife herself was visually impaired, which led him to serve on the organization's first board of directors.

Beginning with his first election as governor of Maine and continuing to the end of his life, Chamberlain was active in the Grand Army of the Republic. Despite continual pain and discomfort from his wounds of 1864, he made many return visits to Gettysburg and delivered speeches at soldiers' reunions. He made his last known visit on May 16 and 17, 1913, while involved in planning the 50th anniversary reunion. Because of deteriorating health, he was unable to attend the reunion less than two months later.

== Death ==
Chamberlain died on February 24, 1914 in Portland, Maine at the age of 85. He is interred at Pine Grove Cemetery in Brunswick, Maine. Beside him as he died was Dr. Abner O. Shaw of Portland, one of the two surgeons who had operated on him in Petersburg 50 years previously. A full study of his medical history strongly suggests that it was caused by complications from the wound suffered at Petersburg that resulted in his death from pneumonia, sepsis, and cystitis caused by recurring kidney infections. He was said to be the last Civil War veteran to die as a result of wounds from the war and considered by some the last casualty of the war; however, Brigadier General Galusha Pennypacker died in 1916 of his Civil War wounds.

== Legacy ==
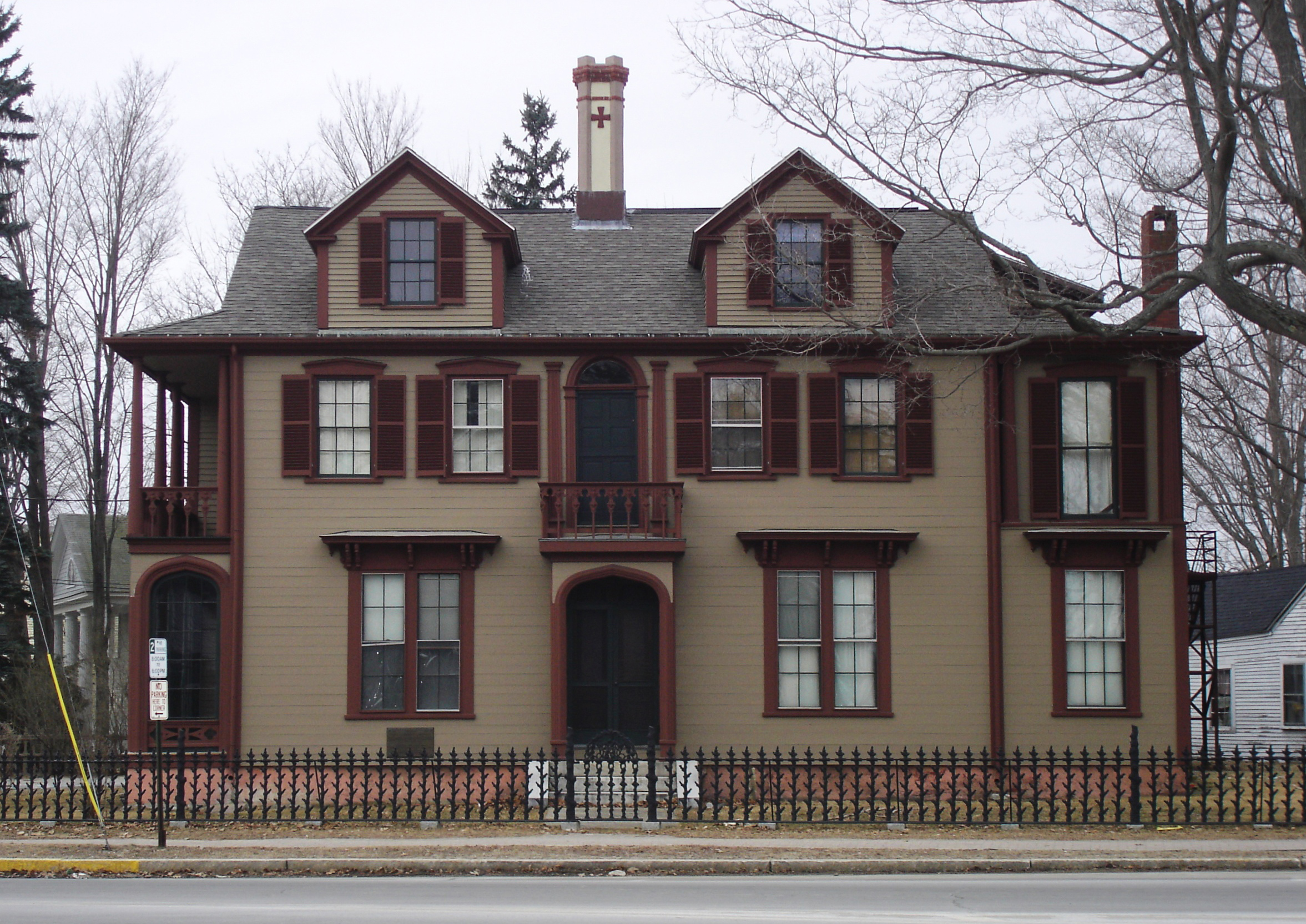
The Joshua Chamberlain Museum

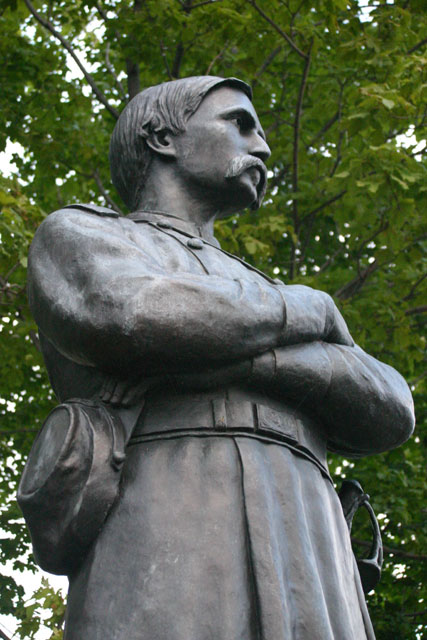
Chamberlain memorial in Brewer

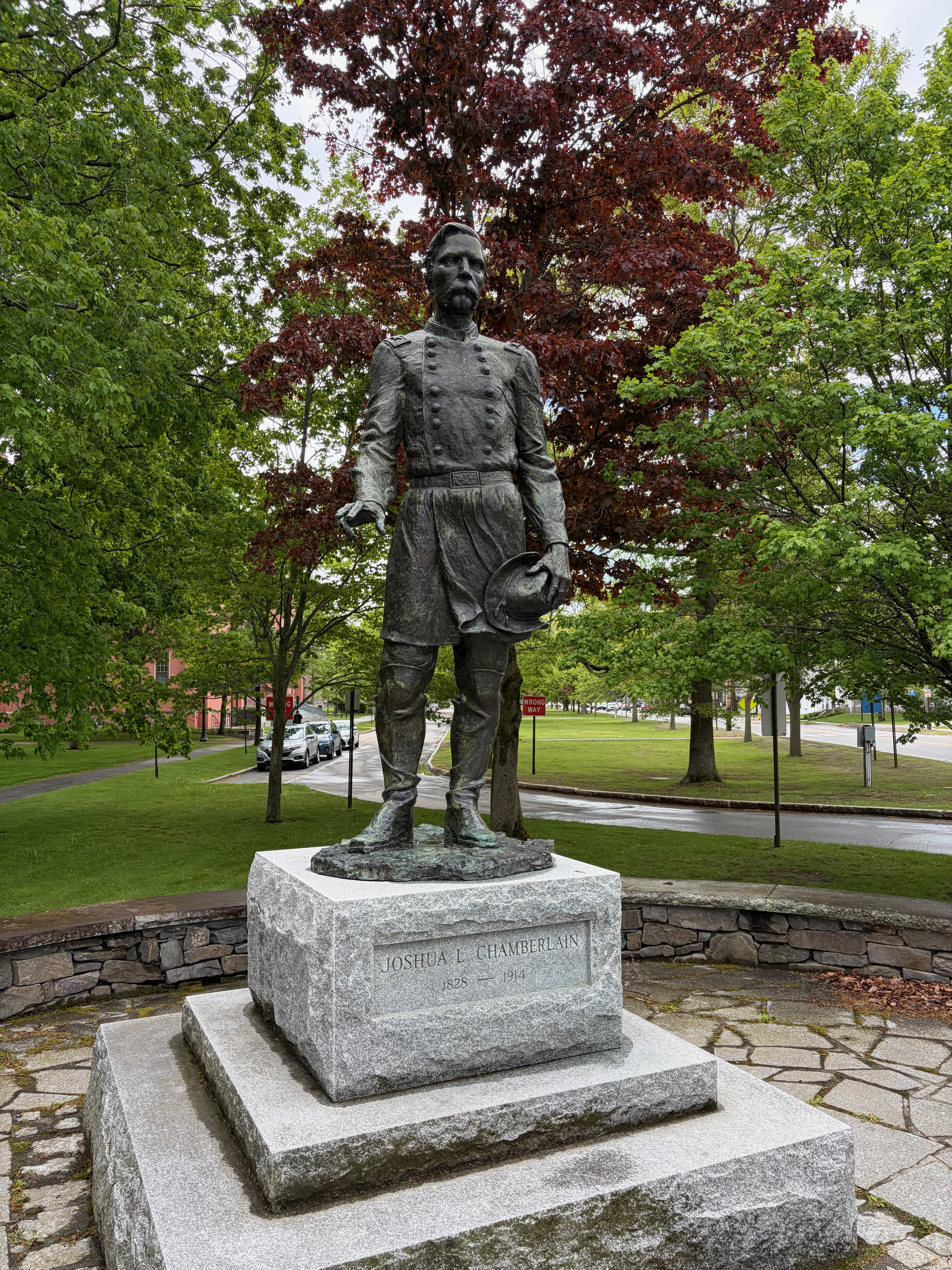
Chamberlain statue erected in 2003 in Upper Mall, adjacent to his alma mater, Bowdoin College, in Brunswick, where he served as president

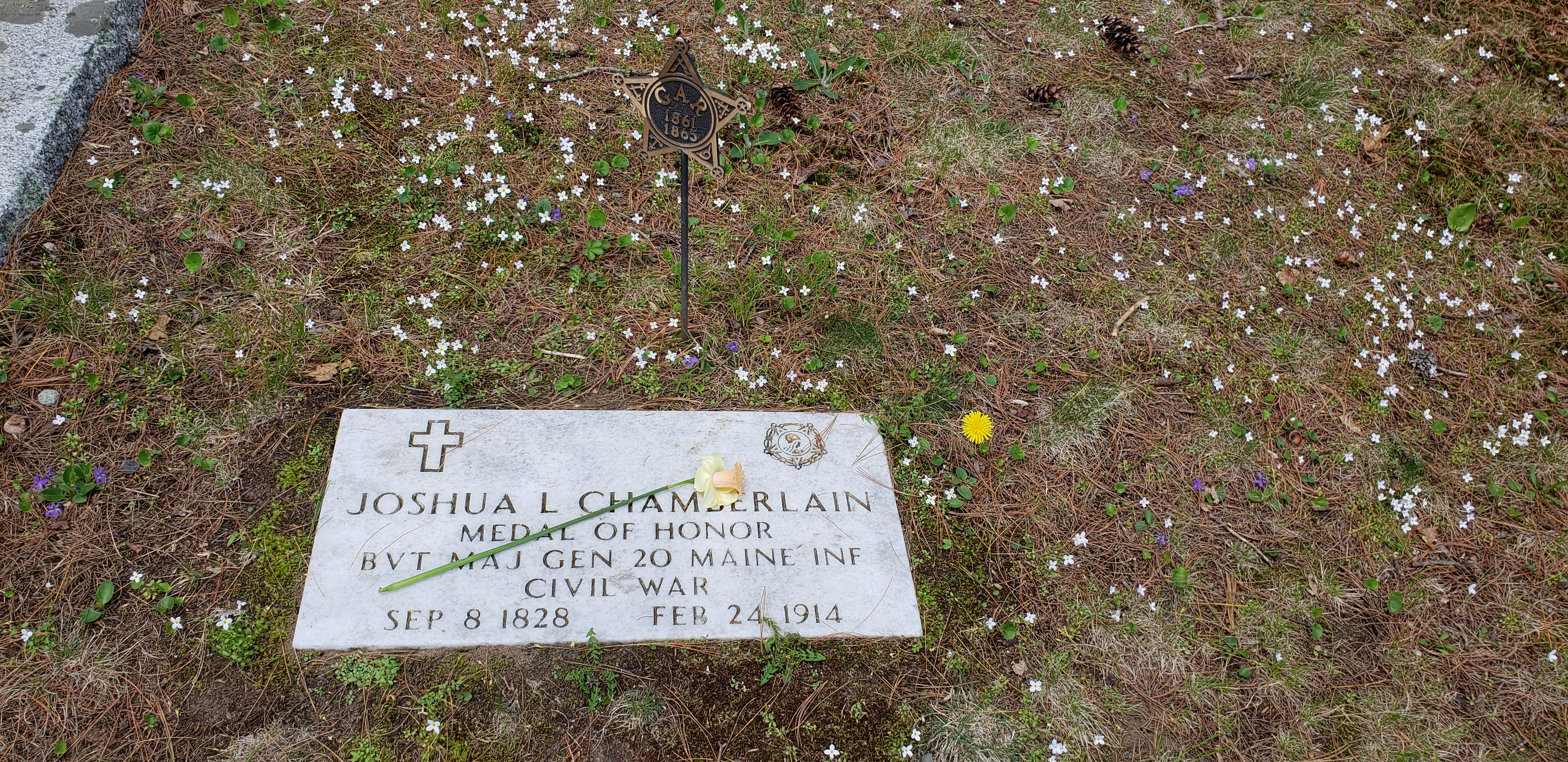
Joshua L. Chamberlain grave marker in Pine Grove Cemetery

Chamberlain's home, located across Maine Street from the Bowdoin College campus, is now the Joshua L. Chamberlain Museum and is owned by the Pejepscot Historical Society, which maintains an extensive research collection on Chamberlain. Memorabilia on display include the minié ball that almost ended his life at Petersburg, his original Medal of Honor, and Don Troiani's original painting of the charge at Little Round Top. Tours of the home are conducted by volunteer docents from late May until mid-October.

US Route 1A is carried across the Penobscot River between Bangor and Brewer, Maine, by the Joshua Chamberlain Bridge, a two-lane steel plate girder bridge opened on November 11, 1954.

The village of Chamberlain, Maine, in the town of Bristol, is named for him.

During an election debate, when asked who should be carved on a theoretical Mt. Rushmore honoring Mainers, Senator Susan Collins proposed Joshua Chamberlain.

=== Medal of Honor ===
In September 2013, the original Medal of Honor awarded to Chamberlain in 1893 was donated to the Pejepscot Historical Society, which owns the Joshua L. Chamberlain Museum in Brunswick, after being authenticated by the Maine State Museum, the Library of Congress, the Smithsonian Institution, and the Awards and Decorations Branch of the Department of the Army. The donor, who chose to remain anonymous, found it in the back of a book bought during a church sale at the First Parish Church in Duxbury, Massachusetts; Chamberlain's granddaughter Rosamond Allen, his last surviving descendant, had donated her estate to that church upon her death in 2000. Chamberlain's alma mater of Bowdoin College has a 1904 Medal of Honor belonging to Chamberlain in its possession. The original 1893 medal is on display at the Chamberlain Museum.

== Bibliography ==
- Maine, Her Place in History, his speech at the Centennial Exhibition (1877)
- Ethics and Politics of the Spanish War (1898)
- Universities and Their Sons, editor (1898)
- Property: Its Office and Sanction (1900)
- De Monts and Acadia (1904)
- Ruling Powers in History (1905)
- The Passing of the Armies (1915)

A special edition of his Paris report on "Education in Europe" was published by the United States government (Washington, 1879).

== Command history ==
- Lieutenant Colonel (second in command under Adelbert Ames), 20th Maine (August 8, 1862)
- Colonel, commanding 20th Maine (May 20, 1863)
- Commanding 3rd Brigade, 1st Division, V Corps (August 26 – November 19, 1863)
- Commanding 1st Brigade (June 6–18, 1864)
- Brigadier General of Volunteers (June 18, 1864)
- Commanding 1st Brigade (November 19, 1864 – January 5, 1865)
- Commanding 1st Brigade (February 27 – April 11, 1865)
- Brevet Major General of Volunteers (March 29, 1865)
- Commanding 1st Division (April 20 – June 28, 1865)
- Commanding 1st Brigade, 3rd Division, Wright's Provisional Corps, Middle Department (June 28 – July 1865)
- Mustered out of volunteer service (January 15, 1866)

== In popular culture ==
Chamberlain emerged as a key character in Michael Shaara's Pulitzer Prize–winning historical novel about Gettysburg, The Killer Angels (1974), and in a prequel novel by his son, Jeff Shaara, Gods and Generals (1996). Chamberlain is portrayed by actor Jeff Daniels in the films Gettysburg (1993) and Gods and Generals (2003), based on the books. His portrayal in these books and films significantly enhanced Chamberlain's reputation in the general public, making him into a more popular and better-known figure.

Tom Eishen's historical novel Courage on Little Round Top is a detailed look at Chamberlain as well as Robert Wicker, the young Confederate officer who fired his pistol at Chamberlain's head during the 20th Maine's historic charge down Little Round Top.

Ken Burns's 1990 nine-part PBS film The Civil War featured Chamberlain prominently.

Steve Earle's song "Dixieland" from his album The Mountain refers to Chamberlain and the Battle of Gettysburg:

I am Kilrain of the 20th Maine and I fight for Chamberlain
'Cause he stood right with us when the Johnnies came like a banshee on the wind
When the smoke cleared out of Gettysburg, many a mother wept
For many a good boy died there, sure, and the air smelled just like death
I am Kilrain of the 20th Maine and I'd march to hell and back again
For Colonel Joshua Chamberlain—we're all goin' down to Dixieland

The book The Lost Regiment and the subsequent series by author William R. Forstchen chronicle the adventures of the "35th Maine", a Union regiment from Maine having been transported to an alien planet. The regiment was based on the 20th Maine, with the main character and commander of the regiment, Andrew Lawrence Keane, also being a college professor.

In the alternate history 2003 novel Gettysburg: A Novel of the Civil War, written by Forstchen and Newt Gingrich, Chamberlain is featured as a character. In the book, an alternate history of the Civil War, Chamberlain makes a heroic stand similar to the real life battle on Little Round Top. Unlike in real life, Chamberlain is overwhelmed, wounded, and forced to surrender, but he survives and returns in the third book of the series, Never Call Retreat (2005).

A musical, Chamberlain: A Civil War Romance, with book and lyrics by Sarah Knapp and music by Steven M. Alper was commissioned by Maine State Music Theatre in 1993 and received its premiere at that theatre in July 1996. That production starred Mark Jacoby as Chamberlain and Sarah Knapp as Fannie Chamberlain. It was revived in a revised form by Maine State in 2014. According to its bookwriter, the musical is "an exploration of the perennial conflict between public duty and private devotion. This musical ... not only celebrates a great Civil War hero, but also examines a universal theme: How a person's sense of duty and destiny affect his personal life."

Another Forstchen work, "A Hard Day For Mother", is a short story from the first volume in the variety anthology series Alternate Generals edited by Harry Turtledove. That work is based on the premise of: "what if Chamberlain was on the Confederate side at Gettysburg?" The story assumes that a decade before the outbreak of the Civil War Chamberlain had taken a teaching job at a Virginia military academy and developed a love for the state of Virginia; that with the outbreak of war he joined the Confederate side under Robert E. Lee; that in Gettysburg he gained the Little Round Top for the Confederacy, fighting against his own brother Tom commanding the 20th Maine; that thereby Chamberlain won the battle and the entire war for the Confederacy; that he later remained in the independent Confederacy and was eventually elected its President; and that his reconciliatory attitude towards the North led to Confederacy and the United States eventually holding referendums and freely deciding to re-unite in 1914, following Chamberlain's death.

On the Showtime TV series Homeland, the character Nicholas Brody tells his family the story of Chamberlain, encouraging them to emulate him.

In the song "Ballad of the 20th Maine" by The Ghost of Paul Revere (Maine's official state ballad):

So we joined the lion of Bowdoin, Chamberlain his name
And we marched once more toward battle as the 20th of Maine

The novel Percy Jackson and the Sea Of Monsters by author Rick Riordan hints at Chamberlain being a demigod, stating that he single-handedly changed the course of the Civil War.

== Dates of rank ==
Insignia	Rank	Date	Component
	Lieutenant Colonel	August 8, 1862	Volunteers
	Colonel	June 20, 1863	Volunteers
	Brigadier General	June 19, 1864	Volunteers
	Brevet Major General	March 29, 1865	Volunteers

== See also ==
- List of Medal of Honor recipients for the Battle of Gettysburg
- List of American Civil War Medal of Honor recipients: A–F
- List of American Civil War generals (Union)
- List of people from Maine

Party political offices
Preceded by Samuel Cony	Republican nominee for Governor of Maine; 1866, 1867, 1868, 1869	Succeeded by Sidney Perham
Political offices
Preceded by Samuel Cony	Governor of Maine; 1867–1871	Succeeded by Sidney Perham
Academic offices
Preceded by Samuel Harris	President of Bowdoin College; 1871–1883	Succeeded by William DeWitt Hyde
