= 1867 Maine gubernatorial election =

- September 9, 1867
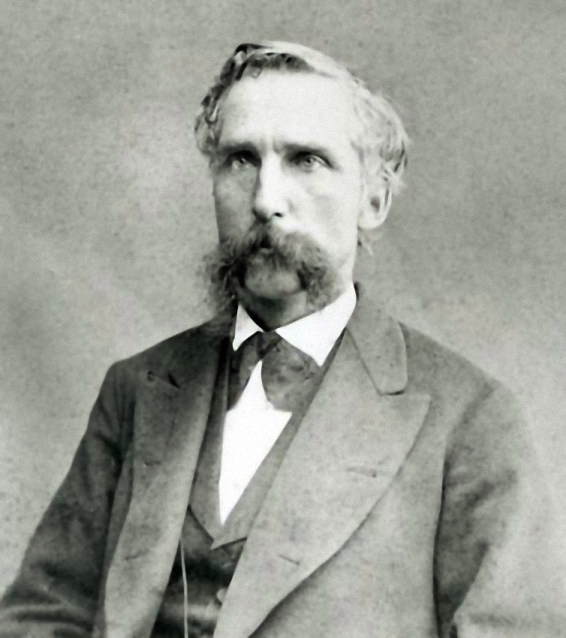

Nominee	Joshua Chamberlain	Eben F. Pillsbury
Party	Republican	Democratic
Popular vote	57,713	45,990
Percentage	55.42%	44.16%
- County results Chamberlain: 50–60% 60–70% Pillsbury: 50–60%
Governor before election
Joshua Chamberlain
Republican
Elected Governor
Joshua Chamberlain
Republican

The 1867 Maine gubernatorial election was held on September 9, 1867. Incumbent Republican governor and war hero Joshua Chamberlain defeated the Democratic candidate Eben F. Pillsbury, in a rematch of the previous year's election.

== General election ==
=== Candidates ===
==== Republican ====
- Joshua Chamberlain

==== Democratic ====
- Eben F. Pillsbury

=== Results ===
Chamberlain won reelection to a second term, and won a majority of 11,723 votes.

1867 Maine gubernatorial election
Party	Candidate	Votes	%	±%
Republican	Joshua Chamberlain (incumbent)	57,713	55.42	▼6.99
Democratic	Eben F. Pillsbury	45,990	44.16	▲6.57
Total votes		103,703	100.00	▼7.08
Republican hold				
