= The Passing of the Armies =

Civil War memoir by Union Army general Joshua Lawrence Chamberlain

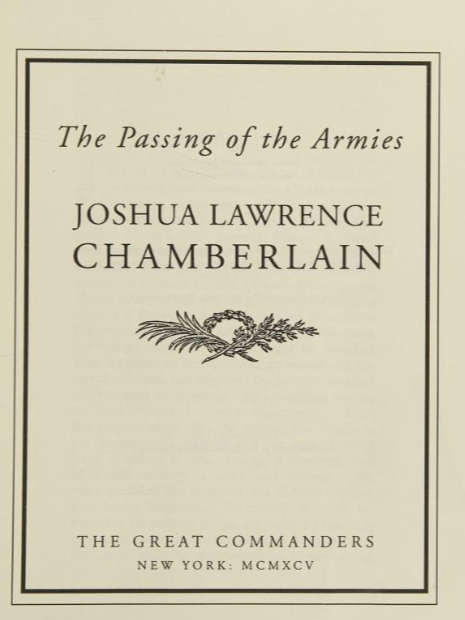
- Title page for The Passing of the Armies (1915)
- Author: Joshua Lawrence Chamberlain
- Language: English
- Genre: Memoir
- Publisher: G. P. Putnam's Sons
- Publication date: 1915
- Publication place: United States
- ISBN: 0-553-29992-1

The Passing of the Armies, full title The Passing of the Armies; An Account of the Final Campaign of the Army of the Potomac, Based Upon Personal Reminiscences of the Fifth Army Corps is an American Civil War memoir written by Joshua Lawrence Chamberlain, a renowned commander most famous for his actions on Little Round Top at the Battle of Gettysburg. It is an autobiographical account describing Chamberlain's experiences in one of the final campaigns of the Civil War and its immediate aftermath, on and off the battlefield. It follows his accounts through Petersburg, White Oak Road, Five Forks, and Appomattox (where Chamberlain was given the honor of accepting the Confederate surrender). Post-surrender events up to and including the participation of Chamberlain and his brigade in the Grand Review of the Armies in Washington, D.C. are also described. Throughout the book, Chamberlain frequently expresses his respect for the soldiers of both the Confederacy and the Union. It was published by Putnam and Sons in 1915, a year after Chamberlain's death.

== Appomattox ==
Respect for the Confederate Army, a common theme in the book, was never more greatly expressed than at the surrender at Appomattox. Chamberlain recalled the events:

We formed...to face the last line of battle, and receive the last remnant of the arms and colors of that great army which ours had been created to confront for all that death can do for life.

Chamberlain goes on to recount how the withered remnants of the armies, formerly robust and strong at the beginning of the war, met each other. The remnants of Hood's division at the Battle of Gettysburg united with the Union Third Corps, exchanging mutual respect. He explains how Longstreet's corps could not be greeted properly after having exchanged volleys of fire and death with each other.
