= Joshua L. Chamberlain Museum =

Museum in Maine, United States

Coordinates: 43°54′37″N 69°57′50″W

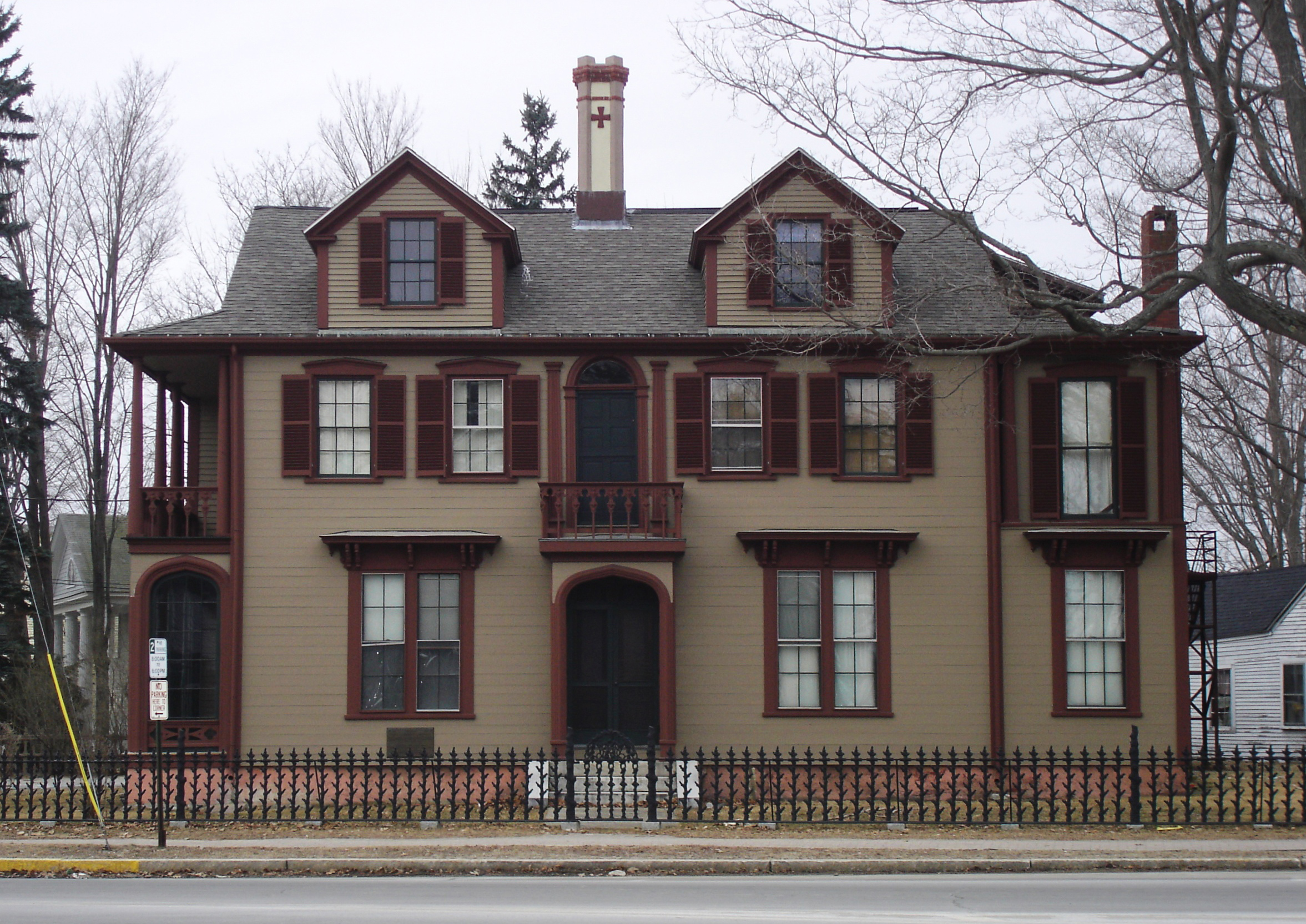
The Joshua L. Chamberlain Museum

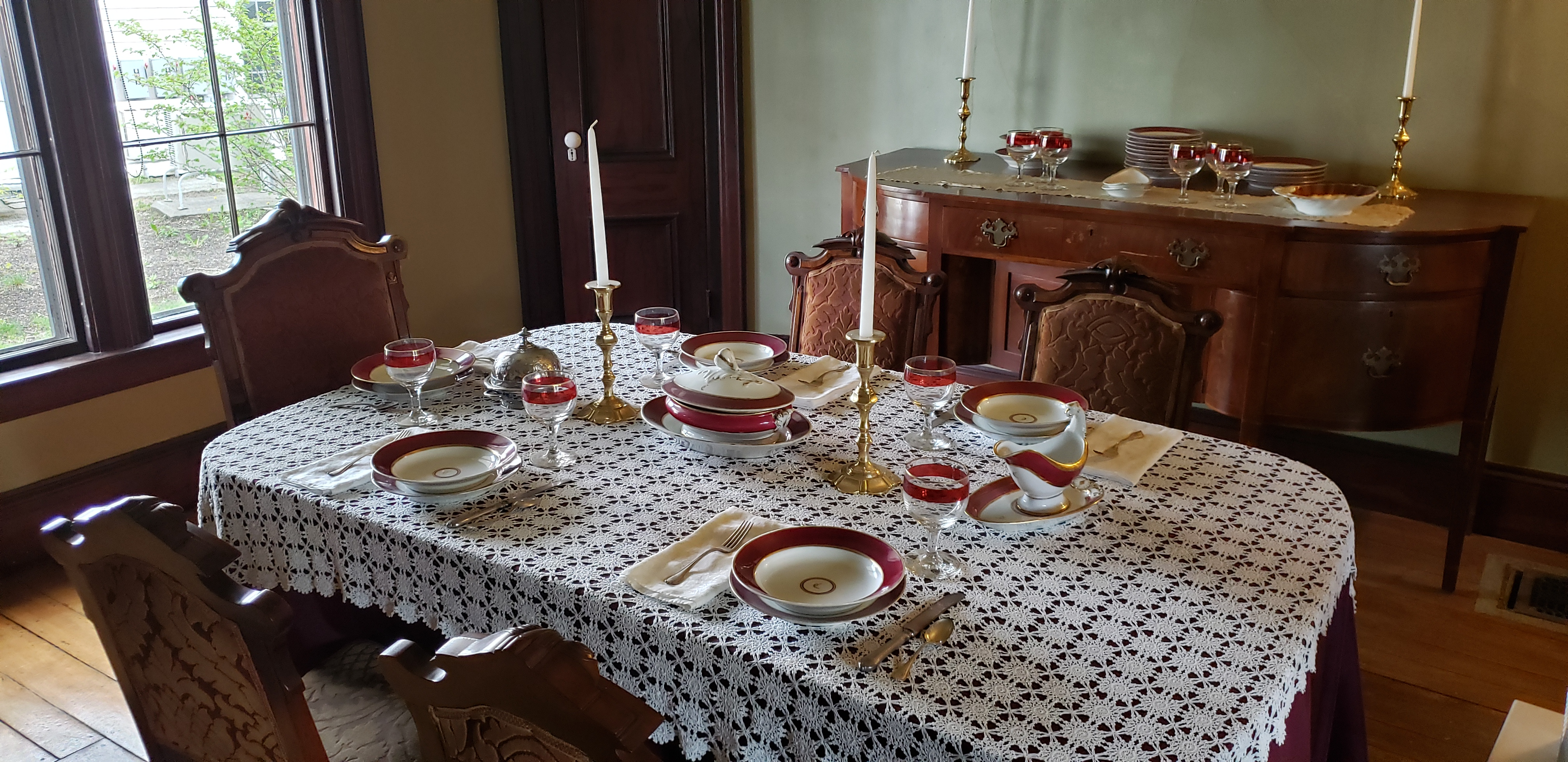
Dining room

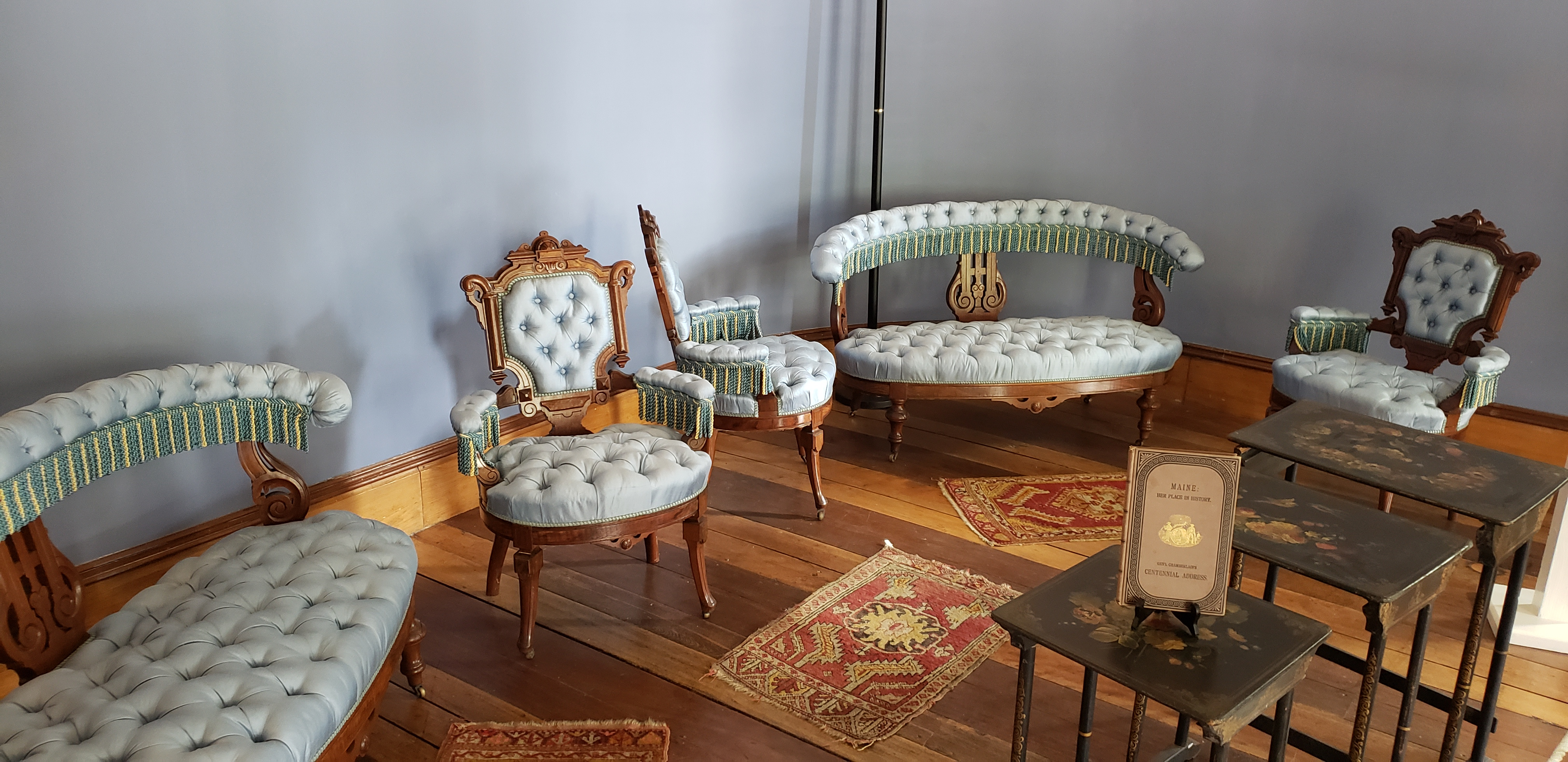
Parlor

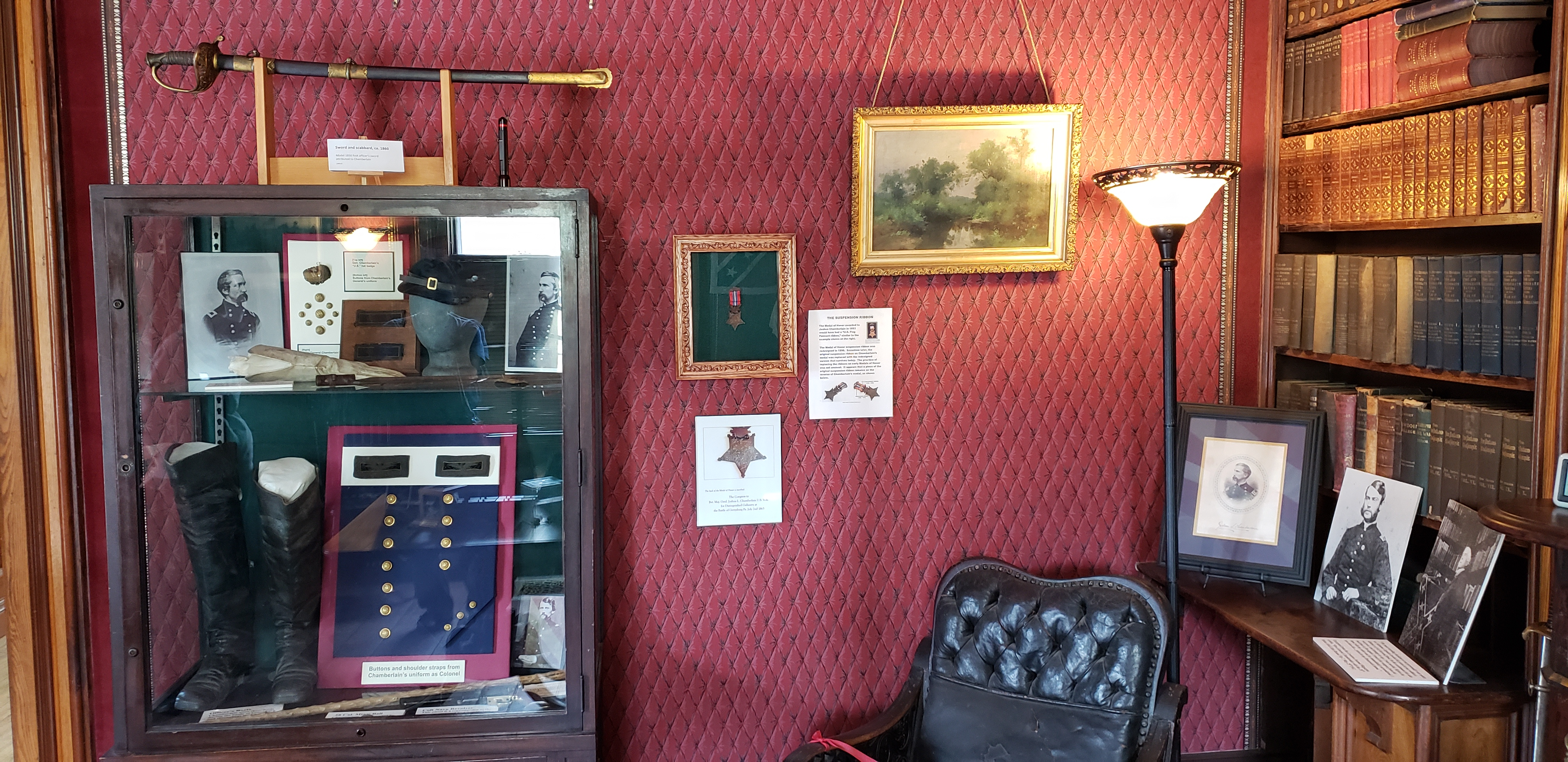
A display of Chamberlain's Civil War memorabilia, including Medal of Honor

The Joshua L. Chamberlain Museum was the home of American Civil War general, Bowdoin College president, and Maine Governor Joshua L. Chamberlain for over 50 years. Located at the corner of Maine Street and Potter Street in Brunswick, Maine, the house is now open seasonally to the public and is in the process of being restored as it was when Chamberlain lived there.

== History of the House ==
=== 1824 to 1859 ===
Jesse Pierce most likely built the original south-facing Greek Revival cape that would become the Chamberlain Museum not long after he purchased a tract of land on Potter Street in 1824. After Pierce lost the property to creditors in 1829, the land and house were purchased by Mary Ann Fales in 1830, who owned the home until 1836. During this time, Fales rented out extra rooms in the home, including three rooms where Henry Wadsworth Longfellow and his first wife lived while Longfellow taught at Bowdoin College.

After the home passed out of the hands of Fales, it went through a steady succession of owners. A prominent local builder named Anthony C. Raymond lived in the home from 1836 until 1838, when it was purchased by David & Alice Dunlap. The Dunlaps kept the home until 1849 and were followed by Edward Fisher (1849–1851), George B. Upham (1851–1852), Roswell Hitchcock (1852–1856) and finally John Wild (1856–1859).

=== 1859 to 1983 ===
In 1859, Professor Joshua L. Chamberlain purchased the home for $2,100 after renting an apartment in the building for two years with his wife Frances Caroline Adams and their two children. After Chamberlain had returned from serving in the Civil War, in 1867 the family sold part of their property to Eldridge Simpson and moved their entire house down the street to the corner of Maine and Potter streets so that it faced east. After the move, several architectural changes were made to the exterior, including the addition of a crenellated trim and chimneys decorated with Latin, Greek and Maltese crosses.

When Chamberlain was chosen as the president of Bowdoin College in 1871, he decided that rather than moving into the President's House on Federal Street he would renovate his own home to accommodate guests. Using equipment from local shipyards, the entire home was jacked up 11 feet (3.4 m) into the air and a new floor built underneath it. This newly-added first floor is generally Gothic in style, though there are elements of both Italianate and Greek Revival architecture as well.

During the 1890s, Chamberlain added a Gothic piazza to the rear of the home, and in 1907 he had the crenellations removed. Upon Chamberlain's death in 1914 his daughter, Grace Allen inherited the home and its contents. Grace rented rooms in the home from 1916 until her death in 1937, when her daughter, Rosamond Allen, inherited the home. Rosamond sold the home and most of its contents to Emery Booker in 1939, who divided the building into seven apartments which were primarily used by Bowdoin College students. In 1983, the Pejepscot Historical Society purchased the building from Booker's estate for the price of $75,000, and opened the home as a museum in 1984.

Noted visitors to Chamberlain's home included Ulysses S. Grant, William Tecumseh Sherman, Philip Sheridan, George B. McClellan, Fitz John Porter, Oliver Otis Howard, Charles Sumner, Carl Schurz, William Pitt Fessenden, Lot Morrill, William P. Frye, Eugene Hale, and James G. Blaine.

== Museum ==
The Pejepscot Historical Society currently operates guided tours of the museum from Memorial Day weekend to Columbus Day weekend. Rooms visited on the tour include the Dining Room, Curvy Room, Entryway, Longfellow Parlor, Library, Governor's Room, Architectural History Room, and Formal Parlor. Some of the items currently on display in the museum are the boots Chamberlain wore at the battle of Gettysburg, his ceremonial governor's chair & desk, Chamberlain's saddle for his horse Charlemagne, and the minié ball which nearly took Chamberlain's life at the Second Battle of Petersburg.

During the winter of 2013-14, severe cold froze the water and heating pipes of the house, causing them to burst and pour water into the first floor. This resulted in serious water damage on two ceilings and a wall in the downstairs parlor and dining room, and to some of the period furniture. The incident sparked a reorganization of the Maine State Museum's disaster plan, resulting in the formation of the Cultural Emergency Resource Coalition (CERC).
