= 1868 Maine gubernatorial election =

- September 14, 1868
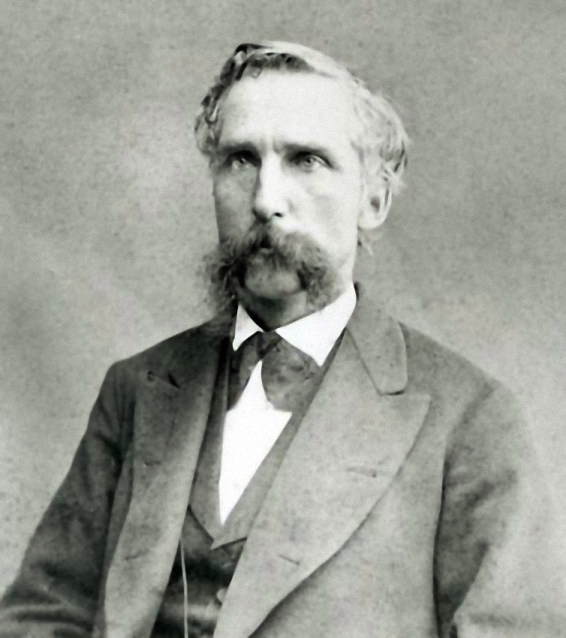

Nominee	Joshua Chamberlain	Eben F. Pillsbury
Party	Republican	Democratic
Popular vote	75,523	56,207
Percentage	57.33%	42.67%
- County results Chamberlain: 50–60% 60–70% Pillsbury: 50–60%
Governor before election
Joshua Chamberlain
Republican
Elected Governor
Joshua Chamberlain
Republican

The 1868 Maine gubernatorial election was held on September 14, 1868. Incumbent Republican governor and war hero Joshua Chamberlain defeated the Democratic candidate Eben F. Pillsbury in a rematch of the preceding two gubernatorial elections.

== General election ==
=== Candidates ===
==== Republican ====
- Joshua Chamberlain

==== Democratic ====
- Eben F. Pillsbury

=== Results ===
Chamberlain won reelection to a third term, and won a majority of 19,316 votes.

1868 Maine gubernatorial election
Party	Candidate	Votes	%	±%
Republican	Joshua Chamberlain (incumbent)	75,523	57.33	▲1.91
Democratic	Eben F. Pillsbury	56,207	42.67	▼1.49
Total votes		131,730	100.00	▲27.03
Republican hold				
