= The Immigrant (musical) =

Musical by Steven Alper, Sarah Knapp, and Mark Harelik

- A New American Musical
- Official website
- Music: Steven M. Alper
- Lyrics: Sarah Knapp
- Book: Mark Harelik
- Basis: Mark Harelik's The Immigrant
- Productions: 2004 Off-Broadway

The Immigrant is a four-person chamber musical with music by Steven M. Alper and lyrics by Sarah Knapp, with a book by Mark Harelik. The show is based on Harelik's 1985 play of the same name.

A Jewish immigrant and his wife enter into the life of an American couple in Texas. In the end, there is a signal of a new start of friendship between the two families and the hope for future.

== Synopsis ==
=== Act I ===
In 1909, Haskell Harelik, a young Russian-Jewish man, steps out of steerage into the port city of Galveston, Texas. Speaking no English, he wrangles together a wheelbarrow and a bunch of bananas and heads north into the great interior. When he reaches the tiny rural community of Hamilton, deep in the heart of Texas, he can go no farther. Exhaustion drops him in the front yard of Milton and Ima Perry. Acting with Christian charity, Ima convinces her husband to give Haskell a room for the night, but when she finds out Haskell is a Jew, she has second thoughts.

Six weeks later, the young immigrant is still in their home. Milton summons Haskell to his office to give him his walking papers, but he gets caught up in Haskell's innocence and excitement about this "new land," and ends up loaning him money for a new horse and wagon. Haskell quickly prospers and Milton keeps giving him assistance against his better judgement. Meanwhile, it revealed that Haskell has indeed been sending money to his wife, Leah, in Russia.

When Ima finds out that a group of boys from town have attacked Haskell on the road, her view of what she considered her good Christian community is shaken, and Milton feels he's made himself a target in the town by helping Haskell. He sets Haskell up in a new grocery store, but when Leah arrives unexpectedly from Russia, Milton and Ima both feel taken advantage of.

Haskell and Leah have moved into the attic above the grocery. Haskell has made a home for himself in Hamilton, but what feels like freedom and promise to Haskell feels like a life of isolation to Leah. Haskell tries to comfort her, but she seems inconsolable.

=== Act II ===
Leah is pregnant with her first child, but is unhappy. Haskell sends her to visit the Perrys. Ima and Leah realize how much they have in common. While Leah's need for a mother and Ima's need for child bring them together, Haskell and Milton still can't settle their differences. Nonetheless, they form a father-son relationship.

Ima urges Milton to get baptized, but Milton refuses. Haskell and Leah have three more kids. However, when Haskell accidentally insults Milton during dinner, Milton storms out of the house. He isn't heard from for a long while, and Haskell goes to find him.

They find Milton, who's immobilized by a stroke. With difficulty, Haskell thanks Milton for saving his life. Only after Haskell leaves does Milton mumble "goodbye."

After Milton dies unbaptized, Ima is desolate and runs to Leah's arms for comfort. Haskell brings home a young sapling to plant in hope of their salvation. The story ends as Haskell, Ima, and Leah gather around the young tree, pressing their hopes and their faith into its new leaves, knowing it will outlive them all.

== Musical numbers ==
Act One

- The Stars / Opening - Haskell
- A Stranger Here - Ima, Milton, Haskell
- Simply Free - Haskell
- Changes - Milton, Haskell
- Travel Light - Leah, Haskell
- Keep Him Safe - Ima
- Changes (reprise) - Haskell
- I Don't Want It - Leah
- The Stars / Finale Act I - Haskell

Act Two

- Take the Comforting Hand of Jesus - Ima
- Padadooly - Ima, Leah
- The Stars - Leah
- The Sun Comes Up - Milton, Haskell, Ima
- Candlesticks - Leah
- Safe and Sound° - Leah, Haskell
- Where Would You Be? - Milton
- No Place To Go - Haskell
- Take the Comforting Hand of Jesus - Ima
- The Stars / Finale - Leah, Ima, Haskell

°On the cast recording, "Shabbos" is listed instead of "Safe and Sound".

== Background ==
The show is based on the story of Harelik's Jewish grandparents, Matleh and Haskell Harelik, who traveled to Galveston, Texas to escape pogroms of Eastern Europe in 1909.

== Productions ==
The Immigrant: A New American Musical was developed off-off-Broadway at CAP-21 and appeared for a limited, two-week run at the CAP-21 Theatre in 2000. The cast featured Evan Pappas as Haskell Harelik, Jacqueline Antaramian as Leah Harelik, Walter Charles as Milton Perry, and Cass Morgan as Ima Perry.

The musical underwent more changes in Denver, Colorado, and then received a production at the Westport County Playhouse in Westport, Connecticut.

A 2013 regional production of The Immigrant at Seven Angels Theatre in Waterbury, Connecticut featured Max Bisantz as Haskell, Rita Markova as Leah, and Paul Blankenship as Milton. In this production, lyricist Sarah Knapp performed the role of Ima and composer Steven M. Alper served as musical director and conductor.

=== 2004 off-Broadway ===
An off-Broadway production produced by Hello Entertainment began previews on October 8, 2004 at Dodger Stages, and officially opened on November 4, 2004.

The show was directed by Randal Myler, with scenic design by Brian Webb, costume design by Willa Kim, lighting design by Don Darnutzer, and sound design by Peter Fitzgerald.

The show featured the same cast as the original production, though Adam Heller replaced Evan Pappas as Haskell. The Immigrant closed on November 28, 2004, after 29 performances. This production was nominated for two Drama Desk Awards for Outstanding Book of a Musical and Outstanding Orchestrations.

== Recordings ==
An original cast recording of the off-Broadway cast was released by Ghostlight Records on July 26, 2005.

== Reception ==
The show was generally well received, getting rave reviews from The Denver Post, Miami Herald, and Chicago Sun-Times.

Laura Hitchcock claimed, in her Curtain Up review, "Few musicals take on religious issues and rituals in such depth and Harelik does it with subtlety and without condescension." On the score, she said that "Alper and Knapp's music hauntingly utilizes the Klezmer and ethnic themes to project Haskell's roots." The New York Times review mentioned that The Immigrant is a "deeply satisfying new musical, with much on its mind about history, humanity, man and God and the American Dream, is beckoning to theatergoers with a taste for rich characters in a tale that touches the heart, glows with humor and soothes the ear."
