= 1866 Maine gubernatorial election =

- September 10, 1866
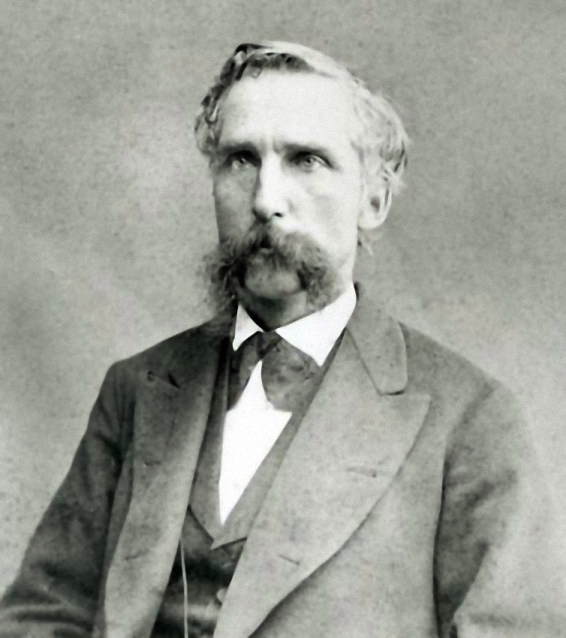

Nominee	Joshua Chamberlain	Eben F. Pillsbury
Party	Republican	Democratic
Popular vote	69,636	41,942
Percentage	62.41%	37.59%
- County results Chamberlain: 50–60% 60–70% 70–80%
Governor before election
Samuel Cony
Republican
Elected Governor
Joshua Chamberlain
Republican

The 1866 Maine gubernatorial election was held on September 10, 1866. Republican candidate and war hero Joshua Chamberlain defeated the Democratic candidate Eben F. Pillsbury.

== General election ==
=== Candidates ===
==== Republican ====
- Joshua Chamberlain

During the American Civil War, Chamberlain played a crucial role at the Battle of Gettysburg. This gave Chamberlain a war hero status.

==== Democratic ====
- Eben F. Pillsbury

=== Results ===
The extremely popular Chamberlain was able to win election to a one-year term as governor. Chamberlain won a majority of 27,687 votes, trouncing his Democratic opponent.

1866 Maine gubernatorial election
Party	Candidate	Votes	%	±%
Republican	Joshua Chamberlain	69,636	62.41	▼0.90
Democratic	Eben F. Pilsbury	41,942	37.59	▲0.90
Total votes		111,578	100.00	▲30.24
Republican hold				
