= Steven M. Alper =

American composer

- Born: January 26, 1958 (age 68)
- Occupations: composer, author
- Partner: Sarah Knapp
- Website: http://knappalper.com/alper/index.html

Steven M. Alper is a music composer, primarily for the theatre, as well as an orchestrator and author. He wrote and orchestrated the score for the musical The Immigrant, for which he was nominated for a Drama Desk Award for Outstanding Orchestrations. The production received a workshop production in New York at CAP-21 in 2000, and, after more work, it ran off-Broadway at Dodger Stages in the fall of 2004.

Alper arranged and conducted several musicals, working with the likes of Stephen Schwartz, Martin Charnin, Todd Rundgren, Morton DaCosta, Charles Strouse, and Don Scardino. His book, entitled Next!—Auditioning for the Musical Theatre, was published by Heinemann Books in the fall of 1996 and reprinted by Girandole Books in 2012.
