= Battle of Gravelly Run =

Battle of Gravelly Run may refer to the following battles in Dinwiddie County, Virginia, during the Appomattox campaign of the American Civil War:

- Battle of Lewis's Farm, March 29, 1865
- Battle of White Oak Road, March 31, 1865

== See also ==
- Virginia in the American Civil War
