= Sarah Knapp =

American actress

- Occupations: Actress, writer, lyricist
- Partner: Steven M. Alper
- Website: http://knappalper.com/knapp/index.html

Sarah Knapp is an American actress, writer, and lyricist, probably best known for writing the lyrics for The Immigrant. As an actress, she appeared in the off-Broadway shows Opal and The No-Frills Revue. Knapp also appeared on Broadway in The Scarlet Pimpernel.
