= Stewie Griffin: The Untold Story =

2005 direct-to-video animated adventure comedy television film

- DVD cover
- Directed by: Pete Michels
- Written by: Gary Janetti; Chris Sheridan; Alex Borstein; Steve Callaghan
- Produced by: Kara Vallow
- Starring: Seth MacFarlane; Alex Borstein; Seth Green; Mila Kunis; Mike Henry; Patrick Warburton; Lori Alan; Drew Barrymore; Rachael MacFarlane; Noel Blanc; Phil LaMarr; Ali Hillis; Busy Philipps; Jason Priestley; Jennie Garth; Tori Spelling; Larry Kenney; Lynne Lipton; Michael Clarke Duncan; Will Sasso
- Edited by: Mike Elias
- Music by: Ron Jones
- Production companies: Fox Television Animation; Fuzzy Door Productions
- Distributed by: 20th Century Fox Home Entertainment
- Release dates: September 27, 2005 (DVD); May 21, 2006 (TV version)
- Running time: 88 minutes 66 minutes (TV version)
- Country: United States
- Language: English

Stewie Griffin: The Untold Story is a 2005 American adult animated direct-to-video adventure comedy television film set in the Family Guy fictional universe. Released on September 27, 2005, the film follows Stewie Griffin, who, after a near-death experience, sees a man who looks just like him on television. Convinced that the man is his real father, Stewie sets off on a cross-country road trip to find him. The DVD release includes audio commentaries and a preview of the first-volume DVD release of American Dad!. The film was 20th Century Fox's first direct-to-video animated feature since 1999's Bartok the Magnificent.

Fox subsequently aired the film as three separate episodes as part of the Family Guy fourth-season finale on May 21, 2006. Several scenes were cut or altered to reduce the film's runtime to 66 minutes. The shortened and separated versions of the three segments – "Stewie B. Goode" (written by Gary Janetti and Chris Sheridan), "Bango Was His Name, Oh!" (written by Alex Borstein), and "Stu and Stewie's Excellent Adventure" (written by Steve Callaghan) – were aired on May 21, 2006.

== Plot ==
The film opens with its own fictional premiere ceremony, with celebrities such as Drew Barrymore and her date the Kool-Aid Man, the Greased-Up Deaf Guy, the Evil Monkey, David Bowie, and the Griffin family attending. In theatre, Channel 5 reveals they have hired Glenn Quagmire to provide them with a bootleg copy of the film. Two pre-roll advertisements play for fictional films—People Who Look Like They Never Sleep..., starring Susan Sarandon and Vince Vaughn, and The Littlest Bunny, made by Disney and featuring music by Randy Newman—before the film begins.

=== "Stewie B. Goode" ===
When the Griffins go swimming at the Quahog Community Pool, Peter tries teaching Stewie to swim and manages to throw him into the pool, despite Stewie begging to be put down. After Stewie nearly drowns, Lois takes Stewie to swimming lessons, where Stewie meets Brad, a child about his age who is the "Star Swimmer." In jealousy, Stewie does everything he can to steal Brad's glory. As a last resort he tries to kill him by rigging a lifeguard chair with dynamite and luring Brad beneath it with marzipan; however, Stewie's detonator malfunctions, blowing up the legs of the chair and causing it to fall on Stewie, presumably killing him. He ends up in Hell with Steve Allen. When Stewie is revived by Lois, he believes it is a sign for him to be a good boy.

After Peter learns that the new video store will not let him rent pornography, he vents his frustration in front of newscaster Tom Tucker, who gives him a job at Quahog 5 hosting a segment called "What Really Grinds My Gears", in which he rants about things that bother him. Peter becomes extremely popular, eventually overshadowing Tucker, who is fired after attempting to distract Peter during filming.

Stewie attempts to be a good boy by smothering Brian with affection. Brian finally goads Stewie into reverting to his old, violent ways by crushing a spider web and eating the spider. When Stewie starts drinking heavily, following Brian's way of coping, Brian attempts to cure Stewie of his alcoholism by taking him out for a night of drinking at the Drunken Clam. While drunk, Stewie crashes Brian's car through the wall of the bar. Knowing Stewie is Peter's son, Tom takes advantage of the situation and presents footage of the accident at the news station. Peter is fired and Tom is rehired as the anchor. The next morning, Stewie has a hangover and realizes his lonely existence in the world, wishing that there were someone else to whom he could relate. At the end, Stewie says it is good that he stopped drinking now, so that it would not have any repercussions later in life.

=== "Bango Was His Name, Oh!" ===
Peter buys a TiVo. While watching the news, Stewie spots a man in San Francisco that has the same face and hairstyle as him. Stewie then believes that he may be his true father. After several failed attempts to raise money for a plane ticket, Stewie learns that Quagmire is going on a cross-country tour in which he plans to have sex with a different woman in every U.S. state (including Las Vegas), and Brian and Stewie hitch a ride in his RV. At a motel in New Jersey, Quagmire is handcuffed to a bed and mugged by a woman, and Stewie and Brian drive off with his RV.

Meanwhile, Peter and Lois are trying to get intimate, but are constantly interrupted by Chris and Meg. To solve this problem, Peter and Lois decide to teach the children how to find dates. After several "lessons", Peter and Lois send them to the mall. However, Lois is concerned that people will think they're bad parents simply because they wanted their children out of the way so they can be together.

Stewie crashes the RV in the desert after going insane from ingesting an entire bottle of "West Coast Turnarounds". After wandering through the desert, Stewie breaks down crying and nearly decides to give up until Brian encourages him to keep going. The two manage to get a rental car and arrive in San Francisco. Stewie mysteriously leaves Brian and confronts the man from TV on a cable car, and is shocked to discover that the man is actually himself from 30 years in the future.

=== "Stu and Stewie's Excellent Adventure" ===
"Stu", as Stewie's future self is called, tells Stewie that he is on vacation (Stu explains that rather than just simply travel to different places in the world, people in the future time-travel to other time periods). Stu reveals he cannot tell anyone about his time, but when he leaves for his time, Stewie stows away with him. Stewie learns he will not become ruler of the world but rather "a 35-year-old Parade magazine-reading virgin". Stewie is further disappointed when, during a family dinner, he learns Lois is still alive, Meg underwent a sex change shortly after college and is now called Ron, Chris is a police officer married to a foul-mouthed chain-smoking woman called Vanessa whose only interest is sticking Lois and Peter into a retirement home so she can have their house, and that Brian died after eating chocolate out of the garbage and is now in Heaven with Ernest Hemingway, Vincent van Gogh, and Kurt Cobain (who all shot themselves). Stu passes off Stewie as a Nicaraguan boy named Pablo to everyone until Stu can send him back to his own time.

Stewie learns he will work at the Quahog Circuit Shack while living with Rupert, his childhood teddy bear, in a filthy apartment. Disgusted with the way his life will turn out, Stewie remodels Stu's apartment and gets him to lose his virginity to his co-worker, Fran (though he spends more time crying than having sex). The next day, Fran tells everyone about the humiliating experience, costing Stu his job for having relations with a co-worker. Returning home, he finds that his apartment is on fire due to the stress-relieving candles Stewie put there. With his life now ruined, Stu laments the day of his near-death experience at the community pool, revealing that, despite Stewie's earlier ascertation that the incident would have no impact on his life, memories of the experience will re-surface when Stewie is 20 years old, causing him to repress most of his major emotions and preventing him from taking any risks.

They visit Lois (who reveals that she had recognized "Pablo" as her "little Stewie" immediately) at a retirement home for a loan and get a new time travel watch, which she agrees to on the condition that Stewie travels back in time to Chris and Vanessa's wedding and kill her as a favor. After saying goodbye to Stu, Stewie travels to the day of the accident (after fulfilling Lois' favor) and prevents himself from getting crushed by the chair. However, future Stewie gets vaporized by present Stewie, thus avoiding a paradox and skipping the formalities of Future Stewie disappearing eventually. In the bleachers at the pool, Meg is seen talking to a man named Ron, admitting she likes the name.

=== Ending ===
At the end, Tricia Takanawa talks with the fans and asks them how they liked the film, receiving completely negative feedback. After this, Tricia asks the family what they did during the show's cancellation between seasons 3 and 4. Peter talks about how he did several part-time jobs that involved wearing costumes, although he always wound up fired because he kept peeing in them because he thought it was like an astronaut suit, but when he finally did become an astronaut, he did not believe he had to pee in the suit and almost died. Brian talks about how he met his fans and competed in the Iditarod Dog Race, only to get very tired and lose. Lois talks about how she became a prostitute and shows video footage of her trying to beat up a police officer and of her having an argument in a convenience store over her wanting to taste the chips. Meg talks about entertaining the U.S. Navy by singing and dressing like Cher for "If I Could Turn Back Time". However, she was actually repulsing the sailors instead, causing them to abandon and scuttle the ship they were on. Stewie talks about his appearances in those "damn" talk shows. Chris talks about his guest appearance on The West Wing.

In the end, during his final speech, Peter rips out a fart as a joke, prompting everyone to laugh. The screen pulls back, revealing it to be on another TV screen with Peter next to it. He explains that over 300 million Americans pass gas each day. He also tells the viewers to "visit my ass" for more information. Peter then rips out another fart as a joke, ending the movie.

== Cast ==
- Seth MacFarlane as Stewie Griffin, Peter Griffin, Brian Griffin, Glenn Quagmire, Tom Tucker, Stewart "Stu" Griffin, Bugs Bunny, and Kool-Aid Man
- Alex Borstein as Lois Griffin, Tricia Takanawa, Vanessa Griffin, Condoleezza Rice, Ann Curry, and Diane Sawyer
- Seth Green as Chris Griffin and Neil Goldman
- Mila Kunis as Meg Griffin and Sexy Girls
- Patrick Warburton as Joe Swanson
- Lori Alan as Diane Simmons and Drunk Lady
- Drew Barrymore as herself
- Mike Henry as Cleveland Brown, Mr. John Herbert, Bruce, and Fred Rogers
- Rachael MacFarlane as Katie Couric, Britney Spears, Luanne Platter, and Muriel Goldman
- Noel Blanc as Elmer Fudd
- Phil LaMarr as Ollie Williams, Judge of Quahog, and Al Roker
- Adam West as Mayor West
- Ali Hillis as Meg Griffin singing "If I Could Turn Back Time"
- Busy Philipps as Additional voices
- Jason Priestley as Brandon Walsh
- Jennie Garth as Kelly Taylor
- Tori Spelling as Donna Martin
- Rory Thost as Brad and Casper the Friendly Ghost
- Michael Clarke Duncan as the Stork
- Will Sasso as Randy Newman and James Lipton
- Kevin Michael Richardson as Young Ray Charles
- Danny Smith as The Evil Monkey who lives in the Closet, Rupert, and Al Harrington
- John Viener as Ron Griffin, Joe Pesci, and Boomhauer
- René Auberjonois as Odo
- Joy Behar as Herself
- Johnny Brennan as Horace
- Bill Fagerbakke as Change For A Buck
- Larry Kenney as Lion-O
- Don LaFontaine as FOX Announcer
- Lynne Lipton as Cheetara

== Release ==
Stewie Griffin: The Untold Story was announced in June 2005 as a direct-to-video exclusive, with a release date set for September 27, 2005. The film was released on DVD and UMD on the scheduled date. The DVD includes audio commentary, deleted scenes, still galleries, animatics, and other bonus features. It is presented in a 1.33:1 full-screen aspect ratio with English Dolby Surround audio and English, Spanish, and French subtitles.

Fox later aired the film as three separate episodes as part of the Family Guy fourth-season finale on May 21, 2006. The three episodes, which constitute the final installments of the season (episodes 28, 29, and 30), adapted the film's storyline into separate installments. The television version was edited to meet broadcast standards, with scenes removed to fit the episodes' running times and other material modified or censored for television. The DVD release retained the original, unedited version of the film.

== Reception ==
=== Revenue ===
Stewie Griffin: The Untold Story generated more than $41 million in consumer spending during its first two weeks of release. The title ranked among the three highest-grossing direct-to-DVD releases of 2005, behind Mulan 2, which generated $60 million, and alongside Tarzan 2, which generated $42 million. The film eventually generated $78.2 million in revenue, making it the highest-grossing DVD premiere of 2005 and prompting the studio to consider producing another Family Guy direct-to-DVD release.

=== Critical response ===
The A.V. Club called it "uneven but frequently hilarious". Several reviewers criticised the film for being too long to sustain interest. Michael Drucker of IGN rated the film 8 out of 10, saying, "As a movie, The Untold Story definitely holds up; every scene of this 88-minute long movie has a joke that works."

== Controversies ==
One cutaway segment features Jesus performing unimpressive finger tricks in the style of Art Metrano's "The Great Metrano" act, while humming "Fine and Dandy". In December 2007, Metrano sued Seth MacFarlane, the producers, and 20th Century Fox for copyright infringement over this cutaway, seeking damages of over $2 million. The case was settled out of court in 2010 with undisclosed terms.

When broadcast in Canada in 2011, the episode was subject to a complaint to the Canadian Broadcast Standards Council. The council ordered that Global Television must apologize to its viewers for not warning them about the violence in a scene where Elmer Fudd kills Bugs Bunny with a rifle during a July 23, 2011 airing of the Family Guy episode "Stewie B. Goode". The Council stated "The panel finds that the scene was definitely somewhat gruesome and uncomfortable to watch. It recognizes, however, that the scene was intended to satirize the violence found in that type of cartoon program. The gag was somewhat tongue-in-cheek since Family Guy itself is an animated program that sometimes contains violence".
