= The Comic Strip (TV series) =

- Official logo
- Developed by: Jules Bass; Arthur Rankin Jr.
- Voices of: Donald Acree; Josh Blake; Camille Bonora; Gary V. Brown; Jim Brownold; Eddie Castrodad; Danielle DuClos; Seth Green; Earl Hammond; Maggie Jakobson; Larry Kenney; Carmen de Lavallade; Bob McFadden; Jim Meskimen; Peter Newman; Gordy Owens; Gerrianne Raphael; Ron Taylor; Tanya Willoughby; Daniel Wooten
- Music by: Bernard Hoffer
- Country of origin: United States
- No. of seasons: 1
- No. of episodes: 65

Production
- Executive producers: Jules Bass; Arthur Rankin, Jr.
- Running time: 20 minutes
- Production companies: Rankin/Bass Animated Entertainment; Pacific Animation Corporation

Original release
- Network: Syndication
- Release: September 7 – December 4, 1987

The Comic Strip is an American animated series that features four rotating cartoon segments: The Mini-Monsters, Street Frogs, Karate Kat and TigerSharks. The 90-minute series ran in first-run syndication during the 1987 season.

This was the last TV series produced by Rankin/Bass Productions, and distributed by Lorimar-Telepictures, before Rankin/Bass Partners dissolved in 2001.

== Segments ==
Characters from the television series

Two segments were shown on each broadcast, each running for about 10 minutes. The four rotating segments are:

=== The Mini-Monsters ===
Human twin siblings Sherman (voiced by Seth Green) and Melissa Baxter are sent to summer camp for one year by their overwhelmed parents. Camp Mini-Mon turns out to be attended by monster children, most of whom are the children of famous monsters, and run by an organ-playing shadowy camp director (voiced by Peter Newman) with his pet vulture. The campers are Count Dracula's son Dracky; Frankenstein's son Franky; The Wolf Man's comedic son Wolfie; The Creature from the Black Lagoon's son Lagoon (voiced by Bob McFadden) who is a certified lifeguard; The Mummy's boxing son Mummo; the Invisible Man's son Blanka; Klutz (voiced by Bob McFadden), a clumsy giant lizard who may be related to Godzilla; Jynx the Witch (voiced by Maggie Wheeler), and Merlin's son Melvin who is accompanied by Cawfield the talking crow (voiced by Earl Hammond). In addition, the camp director is assisted by the camp counselor Garrison and the grandson of Dr. Jekyll and Mr. Hyde (voiced by Bob McFadden) who works as the camp's physician.

=== Street Frogs ===
Street Frogs follows the hijinks of a gang of street-smart frogs: Dr. Slick, Big Max (voiced by Bob McFadden), Spider, Moose the Loose, and "Honey Love" Loretta (voiced by Tanya Willoughby). They are also on good terms with a turtle named Snappy Sam (voiced by Ron Taylor) who is the chef and proprietor of the diner that Loretta works at and the town's DJ Typhoon Toad. Each episode contains a musical number.

=== Karate Kat ===
In a late 50s/early 60s-themed world inhabited by anthropomorphic cats, Karate Kat (voiced by Bob McFadden) is a private investigator who uses his karate to fight crime in his town which is usually in the form of crime boss Big Papa (voiced by Earl Hammond) and his two lackeys named Boom-Boom Burmese (voiced by Larry Kenney) and Sumo Sai (voiced by Earl Hammond). Karate Kat works at McClaws's Detective Agency, run by his short-tempered boss Katie "Big Mama" McClaw (voiced by Gerrianne Raphael), Big Papa's ex-wife. Karate Kat is assisted by his friends/co-workers like his best friend/sparring partner Katgut (voiced by Earl Hammond), inventor Dr. Katmandu (voiced by Larry Kenney), Ciao-Baby and her sister Meow-Baby (both voiced by Maggie Wheeler), and Katatonic (voiced by Bob McFadden).

=== TigerSharks ===
A group of powered-up human/sea animal hybrids consisting of Mako (voiced by Peter Newman), Walro (voiced by Earl Hammond), Dolph (voiced by Larry Kenney), Octavia (voiced by Camille Bonora), Lorca, Bronc, Angel, and Gupp become involved in underwater adventures on the planet Water-O that has them facing off against villains like T-Ray (voiced by Larry Kenney) and Captain Bizzarly (voiced by Earl Hammond).

== Foreign syndication ==
The show was also seen on ABC Television in Australia, on RPN-9 in the Philippines, on RTM 1 in Malaysia (where it was shown after the American children's educational series Sesame Street), on Fun Channel in the Middle East, on TV 4 in Trinidad and Tobago, on ATV in Hong Kong (as part of their children's television strand called Tube Time), on TVJ in Jamaica and on Rai 2 in Italy.

== Home media ==
VHS releases of certain episodes of The Comic Strip were made available in 1987. These VHS tapes each featured three installments of one particular cartoon. For example, the video "Adventures at Camp Mini-Mon" contained three episodes: "Camp Mini-Mon The First Day", "The Belly Ache" and "Alien".

== Episodes ==
=== The Mini-Monsters ===
1. Camp Mini-Mon - The First Day
2. The Bellyache
3. Alien
4. Practical Joke Day
5. Parent's Day
6. Melissa's Magic Painting
7. They're Not Monsters
8. The Big Fight
9. The Swim Meet
10. Cawfield Blows His Cool
11. The Magic Feather
12. The Switch
13. Wolfie's Bet
14. Lagoon in Love
15. Mini-Mon's Horse
16. Dr. Jekyll and Mr. Claws
17. Ghosts in the Night
18. House for Sale
19. Campy Goody Twoshoe
20. Franklyn Builds a Friend
21. Mummo's Birthday
22. Home Movies
23. The Inspection
24. A Visit from Ooze
25. Phantom of the Mess Hall
26. Dracky's Bat

=== Street Frogs ===
1. The Hopline
2. The Crate
3. Typhoon Takes Off
4. The Drop Out
5. Loretta Goes to Hollywood
6. Rapperman
7. Fiddling Around
8. The Super
9. The Babysitters
10. Frog TV
11. Surprise Fights
12. Take Out
13. Moose's Ride
14. The Car Show
15. Bye Bye Toad
16. High Fashion Frogs
17. Fleet Frogs
18. The Derby
19. The Night Job
20. The Hairdo
21. Misty Marvelous
22. The Street Fair
23. Wilfred Returns
24. When I Grow Up
25. The Phone Call

=== Karate Kat ===
1. The Katzenheimer Kaper
2. The Sardine Turnover Kaper
3. The Mousemobile Kaper
4. The Crow Key Kaper
5. The Kata Hari Kaper
6. The Picat-So Kaper
7. Ticktocking Along
8. The Koffee Kup Kaper
9. Kat Tracks
10. The Bank Heist
11. The Tabby Tire Tracker
12. The Pink Sphinx
13. Cat's Ahoy
14. The Cousin Kaper
15. The Bathtub Bandits
16. Pretty Kitty Kaper
17. The Kattensniffer Kaper
18. The Cats 'N Bats Kaper
19. The Tabby Telemann Kaper
20. Cat Goes Ape
21. The Ghost of Legs Larue
22. Kat's Paws
23. The Twin Brother Kaper
24. The Amnesia Kaper
25. The Lonely Hearts Kaper
