= TigerSharks =

- The official logo for TigerSharks
- Genre: Science fiction; Superhero
- Developed by: Jules Bass; Arthur Rankin Jr.
- Voices of: Peter Newman; Earl Hammond; Larry Kenney; Camille Bonora; Jim Meskimen
- Composer: Bernard Hoffer
- Country of origin: United States
- No. of seasons: 1
- No. of episodes: 26

Production
- Executive producers: Arthur Rankin Jr. Jules Bass
- Running time: 22 minutes
- Production company: Rankin/Bass Animated Entertainment (Note: Pacific Animation Corporation)

Original release
- Network: First-run syndication
- Release: September 7 – December 4, 1987

TigerSharks is an American animated children's television series developed by Rankin/Bass and distributed by Lorimar-Telepictures in 1987. The series involved a team of heroes that could transform into amalgams of human and marine animals and resembled the series ThunderCats and SilverHawks, also developed by Rankin/Bass.

== Plot ==
In a futuristic time, the TigerShark team are humans and unidentified aliens who use a device called the Fish Tank to transform into hybrids of marine animals. The TigerSharks' base is SARK, a spaceship that can function underwater. The ship contains the Fish Tank, its own A.I., and other research facilities.

The TigerSharks operate in Water-O (pronounced Wah-tare-oh), a planet that is almost completely covered by water and inhabited by a fish-like species called the Waterians. The TigerSharks arrived there on a research mission and ended up serving as the protectors of the planet against the evil Mantannas, led by T-Ray. To make matters worse, T-Ray ends up freeing Captain Bizzarly and his pirate crew from their icy imprisonment.

== Characters ==
=== TigerSharks ===
Protectors of Water-O, the team members are:

- Mako (voiced by Peter Newman) is a gifted scuba diver and is considered the field commander of the TigerSharks. He transforms into a human/mako shark hybrid, which grants him incredible speed underwater. Mako also uses his forearm fins and head fin to slice through metal.
- Walro (voiced by Earl Hammond) is the scientific and mechanical genius who created the Fish Tank. He acts as the advisor of the team and is very respected by his comrades. Walro turns into a human/walrus hybrid. He wields a cane that has a wide variety of weapons.
- Rodolfo "Dolph" (voiced by Larry Kenney) is Octavia's lieutenant aboard the SARK and is also an natural scuba diver. Dolph loves a good joke, even at his own expense, but he is always blunt when needed, and his work produces results that speak for themselves. Dolph turns into a human/dolphin hybrid, which makes him very maneuverable underwater and can shoot a strong jet of water from his blowhole. Dolph is unable to breathe underwater in his aquatic form and must surface often to replenish his air supply.
- Octavia (voiced by Camille Bonora) is a Captain of the SARK, communications technician and main strategist. Octavia turns into a human/octopus hybrid with tentacles in place of hair.
- Lorca is the team's mechanic and often helps Walro to repair or build new machines. He is also the team's strongest member. Lorca turns into a human/orca hybrid. Like Dolph, he cannot breathe underwater in his aquatic form, and therefore must surface frequently for oxygen. He speaks with an Australian accent.
- Bronc is a teenager who, along with his sister Angel, works as an assistant aboard the SARK. Bronc is very adventurous and sometimes reckless. He turns into a human/seahorse hybrid, hence his name, which is derived from "Bronco".
- Angel is another teenage member of the SARK's crew. Angel is more serious and responsible than her brother. She turns into a human/angelfish hybrid.
- Gupp is the TigerSharks' pet Cocker Spaniel. His features, including flipper-shaped legs and pin teeth, resemble a pinniped.
- SARK A.I. is the artificial intelligence of the SARK.

=== Villains ===
The show featured two groups of major antagonists, both with teams of followers. Both are in alliance to conquer Water-O and destroy the TigerSharks, but plan to betray each other once these goals are met. They are:

- The Mantannas are a race of alien sea creatures who arrived on Water-O after their home planet dried up. The Mantannas cannot breathe air and use a water-breathing apparatus to survive on land.
  - T-Ray (voiced by Larry Kenney) is a manta ray hybrid-type creature and the leader of the Mantannas. He wields a whip.
  - Wall-Eye (voiced by Peter Newman) is a frog hybrid who is T-Ray's aide-de-camp. He can hypnotize people by spinning his eyes.
  - Shad (voiced by Earl Hammond) is a bad-tempered grouper hybrid. He wears a belt that can shoot electrical blasts.
  - Dredge is an eel-like mutant who carries a pet electric eel on his back.
  - Carper and Weakfish are two mermen with frog-like faces. They are identical twin brothers who (as befitting their names) whine and complain about everything. Carper has green skin while Weakfish has purple skin. They are also shown to have a fear of dogs as seen in the first episode when they are frightened away by Gupp.
- Captain Bizzarly (voiced by Earl Hammond) is the captain of a crew of pirate with aquaphobia who controlled all crime-related activities on the vast oceans of Water-O until the Waterians froze him and his crew in ice many years ago. T-Ray freed Bizzarly and his crew expecting them to join forces, though they secretly plan to betray the other once their goals are accomplished.
  - Dragonstein is a winged sea dragon-like creature with bolts in its neck who is Bizzarly's pet and bodyguard.
  - Spike Marlin is a wrinkly-faced humanoid who is Bizzarly's first mate. Presumably named after a marlinspike, he wields a customized polearm.
  - Long John Silverfish is a humanoid with fish-like features and wields an electrified whip.
  - Soulmate is a humanoid and only female member of Bizzarly's crew who dresses like a samurai. She wields a sword, among other weapons.
  - Lump is a slimy shapeshifting blob-like creature.
  - Grunt is an towering ape-faced humanoid who grunts like an ape and is the largest of the pirates.

=== Other characters ===
- Pappagallo is a Waterian who is a member of Water-O's ruling council.
- Hydra is a female Waterian who is a member of Water-O's ruling council.
- Goby is a Waterian who is a member of Water-O's ruling council.
- Bowfin is a young Waterian.

== Episodes ==
| No. | Title | Written by | Original release date |
|---|---|---|---|
| 1 | "Voyage to Water-O" | Peter Lawrence; Julian P. Gardner | September 7, 1987 |
Mako leads his crew to Water-O when their teammate Lorca and two Waterians have been captured upon the arrival of T-Ray and the Mantennas. To make things worse, T-Ray has freed Captain Bizzarly and Dragonstein from their icy prison. With the Fish Tank invention, the TigerSharks must rescue Lorca from T-Ray and Captain Bizzarly.
| 2 | "SARK to the Rescue" | Peter Lawrence | September 10, 1987 |
The TigerSharks work to protect the Waterians while working to reclaim a cargo of a deadly explosive called X-400 from a sunken cargo ship while planning not to let it fall into the wrong hands. Meanwhile, T-Ray sends Carper and Weakfish to reclaim the Sawbill from the TigerSharks so that they can free the rest of Captain Bizarrly's crew from their icy imprisonment.
| 3 | "Save the SARK" | Chris Trengove | September 14, 1987 |
| 4 | "The Deep Fryer" | Kimberly Morris | September 17, 1987 |
| 5 | "Bowfin" | Bill Ratter | September 21, 1987 |
| 6 | "Pappagallo's Present" | Kimberly Morris | September 24, 1987 |
| 7 | "The Lighthouse" | Lee Schneider | September 28, 1987 |
The Mantennas have sabotaged the Waterian City by having it drift to Killer Reef after detaching the cable that holds it in place. As the TigerSharks come to their aid, Captain Bizarrly and Grunt destroy a vital lighthouse that lured SARK onto the rocks at Killer Reef. As Octavia works to free the SARK, Captain Bizzarly as Soulmate and Lump fire on the SARK. Now the TigerSharks must work to stop Captain Bizarrly's attack and keep the Waterian City from drifting into Killer Reef.
| 8 | "Go with the Flow" | Chris Trengove | October 1, 1987 |
| 9 | "Termagant" | Lee Schneider | October 5, 1987 |
Lorca and Bowfin look for a giant fish named Termagant on Pappagallo's behalf. Though T-Ray and the Mantennas end up aggravating Termagant with Lorca and Bowfin caught in the crossfire. After getting away from Termagant, Loca and Bowfin reunite with the TigerSharks as they work to keep T-Ray from harming Termagant further and keep it corralled.
| 10 | "The Terror of Dragonstein" | Unknown | October 8, 1987 |
| 11 | "The Search for Redfin" | Unknown | October 12, 1987 |
| 12 | "The Kraken" | Unknown | October 15, 1987 |
| 13 | "Stowaway" | Unknown | October 19, 1987 |
| 14 | "Iced" | Unknown | October 22, 1987 |
| 15 | "The Volcano" | Unknown | October 26, 1987 |
| 16 | "A Question of Age" | Unknown | October 29, 1987 |
| 17 | "Eye of the Storm" | Unknown | November 2, 1987 |
| 18 | "Departure" | Unknown | November 5, 1987 |
| 19 | "Murky Waters" | Bill Ratter | November 9, 1987 |
| 20 | "Spellbinder" | J. Larry Carroll | November 12, 1987 |
Water-O's ruling council contacts the TigerSharks to inform them that Captain Bizzarly is searching the Misty Isles for a hypnotic weapon called the Spellbinder that was once used to enslave some ancient Waterians, but it does not have an effect on females. When Captain Bizzarly gets his hands on the Spellbinder, he tests it on Lump and allows Soulmate to use it on the TigerSharks. After Soulmate hypnotizes Mako, Dolph, Walro, Lorca, and Bronco, Angel gets detained, and SARK gets hijacked, it is up to Octavia and Gupp to save their friends and fight off Captain Bizarrly's crew.
| 21 | "The Waterscope" | Kimberly Morris | November 16, 1987 |
| 22 | "The Point of No Return" | Unknown | November 19, 1987 |
| 23 | "The Scavenger Hunt" | Unknown | November 23, 1987 |
| 24 | "Paradise Island" | Unknown | November 26, 1987 |
| 25 | "The Treasure Map" | Unknown | November 30, 1987 |
| 26 | "Redfin Returns" | Unknown | December 4, 1987 |

== Production and development ==
Rankin/Bass followed up their successful ThunderCats and SilverHawks with this series about a team of powered up man/marine form hybrids called the "TigerSharks". It also featured many of the same voice actors who had worked on ThunderCats and SilverHawks including Larry Kenney, Peter Newman, Earl Hammond, Doug Preis and Bob McFadden.

The series lasted one season with 26 episodes and was part of the show The Comic Strip, which consisted of four animated shorts: TigerSharks, Street Frogs, The Mini-Monsters, and Karate Kat.

The animation was provided by Japanese studio Pacific Animation Corporation. Warner Bros. Animation currently owns the series, as they own the 1974–89 Rankin/Bass library, which was incorporated into the merger of Lorimar-Telepictures and Warner Bros.

== Merchandise ==
A TigerSharks action figure line was made by LJN, which also made toys for ThunderCats.

In 2026, a new line of TigerSharks action figures was announced.

== In other media ==
The TigerSharks made a cameo in an episode of the 2011 ThunderCats remake called "Legacy". They are among the animals that were forced to work under Mumm-Ra.
