= A Little Curious =

- The main characters of the show (front row-left to right: Mr. String, Little Cup, Mary Jane, Bob the Ball, Lacey, Pad and Pencil; back row-left to right: Mrs. Shoe, Doris the door, Mop and Mr. Shoe; Absent: Plush)
- Genre: Anthology series Musical; Comedy; Educational
- Created by: Steve Oakes
- Written by: Carin Greenberg Baker; Nicholas Hollander; Laurie Israel; Becky Mode; Alana Sanko; Frederick J. Stroppel
- Directed by: Steve Oakes
- Voices of: Cameron Bowen; Amanda Kaplan; Gary Yudman; Marilyn Pasekoff; Bob Kaliban; Gerrianne Raphael; Rafael Ferrer; Sandy Correia; Robert Axelrod
- Theme music composer: Pat Irwin
- Opening theme: "I'm a Little Curious" performed by The Manhattan Transfer
- Ending theme: "I'm a Little Curious" (instrumental) (season 1) "I'm a Little Curious" (instrumental reorchestration) (season 2)
- Composer: Pat Irwin
- Country of origin: United States
- Original language: English
- No. of seasons: 2
- No. of episodes: 43

Production
- Executive producers: Carole Rosen; Sheila Nevins; Susan Holden; Steve Oakes; Richard Winkler; Tom Box
- Producer: John Hoffman
- Running time: 24 minutes
- Production company: Curious Pictures

Original release
- Network: HBO
- Release: February 1, 1999 – May 1, 2000

A Little Curious is an American children's animated TV series that ran on HBO and its multiplex channel HBO Family for two seasons. The series premiered on February 1, 1999 until its last episode aired on May 1, 2000. The series, produced by cel-and-computer, New York-based animation studio Curious Pictures, was aimed mainly at preschoolers. It was one of the cornerstone programs for the relaunch of the HBO Family channel in February 1999, but removed in repeats currently.

== Plot ==
The 24-minute episodes are essentially anthologies of shorts focused on a common, easily digested topic word such as "slippery" or "sticky". While each short draws from the same pool of characters, they are produced in a variety of animation techniques. Animation styles include stop-motion, collage animation, clay animation, traditional 3-D and 2-D hand-drawn animation, and 3-D CGI, along with live-action segments mostly narrated by Bob the Ball. Some of the shorts are designed to fit more than one topic, and are re-used in different episodes.

== Characters ==
The pool of characters, which are inanimate everyday objects, include:

=== Main characters ===
- Bob the Ball – a cute, friendly, boisterous, exuberant bouncing red rubber ball. He narrates every episode except "Bob the Ball".

Gender: Male
Voiced by: Cameron Bowen

- Little Cup – a sweetened, innocent glass cup of fruit punch who spends a lot of time learning about the world around him. He is Bob's best friend.

Gender: Male
Voiced by: Bob Kaliban

- Mop – a rock music-loving yellow mop with a head of turquoise yarn who frequently changes her hairstyle. She is Mr. String's best friend.

Gender: Female
Voiced by: Amanda Kaplan

- Doris the Door – a pink and orange, Brooklyn-accented, two-faced automatic door, who, while being playful, is easily tired. Doris usually talks about her distant childhood. She narrates the episode, "Bob the Ball".

Gender: Female
Voiced by: Marilyn Pasekoff

- Mr. String – a nervous, intelligent, fussy piece of blue string who can twist and tie himself into a multitude of shapes. He frequently says "definitely" and "terrible".

Gender: Male
Voiced by: Gary Yudman

- Plush – a multicolored, air-headed stuffed dog who is another one of Bob's best friends. Unlike the others, he mostly speaks in a strange giggly language.

Gender: Male
Voiced by: Bob Kaliban

- Pad and Pencil – a presumably romantic, Disneyesque drawing notebook and pencil couple who constantly flatter each other through stereotypical French accents.

Gender: Female (Pad), Male (Pencil)
Voiced by: Gerrianne Raphael (Pad), Rafael Ferrer (Pencil)

- The Shoe Family – a family of pairs of shoes with footwear-themed names. The parents are Mr. Shoe (brown dress shoes) and Mrs. Shoe (red high heels), and the children are two daughters named Mary Jane (a pair of Mary Janes) and Lacey (Sneakers). Mary Jane and Lacey are two of Bob's best friends.

Gender: Male (Mr. Shoe), Female (Mrs. Shoe, Mary Jane, and Lacey)
Voiced by: Gary Yudman (Mr. Shoe), Sandy Correia (Mrs. Shoe and Lacey), Amanda Kaplan (Mary Jane)

The characters appear to be designed to evoke a sense of familiarity in preschoolers. For instance, young children can see aspects of their own personalities in Bob and Little Cup, observe the family dynamic among the Shoe Family, and perhaps most obviously, see a bit of their grandparents in Doris the door.

=== Minor Characters ===
- Pairs of Shoes - Other Pairs of Shoes
- Booties - Mary Jane's and Lacey's baby brother in "A Little Curious About Life".
- Irving the Awning - Doris's

== Episodes ==
=== Season 1 (1999) ===
1. Loud, Soft, Shake (February 1, 1999)
2. Light, Dark, Bubble (February 8, 1999)
3. Near, Far, Swing (February 15, 1999)
4. Slippery, Sticky, Mirror (February 22, 1999)
5. Above, Below, Cover (March 1, 1999)
6. Front, Back, Side (March 8, 1999)
7. Swing, Cover, Shake (March 15, 1999)
8. Rough, Smooth, Picture (March 22, 1999)
9. Open, Close, Ring (March 29, 1999)
10. Bubble, Picture, Mirror (April 5, 1999)
11. Thick, Thin, Twist (April 12, 1999)
12. First, Last, Step (April 19, 1999)
13. Step, Twist, Ring (April 26, 1999)
14. Empty, Full, Pop (May 3, 1999)
15. Same, Different, Beat (May 10, 1999)
16. Fast, Slow, Spin (May 17, 1999)
17. Long, Short, Roll (May 24, 1999)
18. Character Show – Bob the Ball (May 31, 1999)
19. Roll, Spin, Pop (June 7, 1999)
20. Warm, Cool, Heart (June 14, 1999)
21. Character Show – Plush (June 21, 1999)
22. Still, Move, Train (June 28, 1999)
23. Spring, Fall, Turn (July 5, 1999)
24. High, Low, Stretch (July 12, 1999)
25. Side, Stretch, Turn (July 19, 1999)

=== Season 2 (2000) ===
1. Top, Bottom, Jump (January 3, 2000)
2. Over, Under, Balance (January 10, 2000)
3. Drop, Lift, Flat (January 17, 2000)
4. Tight, Loose, Squeeze (January 24, 2000)
5. Hit, Miss, Bump (January 31, 2000)
6. Work, Play, Skip (February 7, 2000)
7. Hard, Easy, Change (February 14, 2000)
8. New, Old, Dance (February 21, 2000)
9. Lead, Follow, Act (February 28, 2000)
10. Win, Lose, Tie (March 6, 2000)
11. Push, Pull, Rock (March 13, 2000)
12. Jump, Flat, Squeeze (March 27, 2000)
13. Hard, Work, Bump (April 3, 2000)
14. Character Show - Mop (April 10, 2000)
15. Balance, Skip, Rock (April 17, 2000)
16. Push, Over, Top (April 24, 2000)
17. Drop, Loose, Change (May 1, 2000)

=== Special (2000) ===
1. A Little Curious About Life (March 20, 2000)
