= Earle Hyman =

American actor (1926–2017)

- Born: George Earle Plummer; October 11, 1926; Rocky Mount, North Carolina, U.S.
- Died: November 17, 2017 (aged 91); Englewood, New Jersey, U.S.
- Other name: Earl Hyman
- Occupation: Actor
- Years active: 1943–2001

Earle Hyman (born George Earle Plummer; October 11, 1926 – November 17, 2017) was an American stage, television, and film actor. Hyman is known for his role on ThunderCats as the voice of Panthro and various other characters. He also appeared on The Cosby Show as Cliff's father, Russell Huxtable. Singer Phyllis Hyman was his cousin.

== Life and career ==
Hyman was born in 1926 in Rocky Mount, North Carolina, as George Earle Plummer according to the North Carolina Birth Index. He claimed Native American ancestry. His parents, Zachariah Hyman and Maria Lilly Plummer, seeking better educational opportunities, moved their family from the south to Brooklyn, New York, in the late 1920s, where Hyman primarily grew up. Hyman knew at age 4 that he wanted to become an actor after performing a poem at a church play and was determined to become one after seeing a production of Norwegian playwright Henrik Ibsen's Ghosts.

The first play I ever saw was a present from my parents on my 13th birthday – Nazimova in Ghosts at Brighton Beach on the subway circuit – and I just freaked out.

He studied acting at HB Studio in New York City. He made his Broadway stage debut as a teenager in 1943 in Run, Little Chillun, and later joined the American Negro Theater. The following year, Hyman began a two-year run playing the role of Rudolf on Broadway in Anna Lucasta, starring Hilda Simms in the title role. He was a member of the American Shakespeare Theatre beginning with its first season in 1955, and played the role of Othello in the 1957 season.

In December 1958, he came to London to play the leading role in Moon on a Rainbow Shawl, by Errol John, at the Royal Court.

In 1959, he again appeared in the West End, this time in the first London production of A Raisin In the Sun, alongside Kim Hamilton. The show ran at the Adelphi Theatre and was directed by Lloyd Richards. A life member of The Actors Studio, Hyman appeared throughout his career in productions in both the United States and Norway, where he also owned property. In 1965, he won a Theatre World Award and in 1988, he was awarded the St Olav's medal for his work in Norwegian theater.

In addition to his stage work, Hyman appeared in various television and film roles including adaptions of Macbeth (1968), Julius Caesar (1979), and Coriolanus (1979), and voiced Panthro on the animated television series ThunderCats (1985–1989). He played two roles (at different times) on television's The Edge of Night.

One of his most well known roles, that of Russell Huxtable in The Cosby Show, earned him an Emmy Award nomination in 1986. He played the father of lead character Cliff Huxtable, played by Bill Cosby.

=== Death ===
Hyman died in 2017, at the Lillian Booth Actors Home in Englewood, New Jersey. He was 91.

In June 2020, the Folger Shakespeare Library, a private research library in Washington D.C., acquired Hyman's personal items and memorabilia to be displayed as the Earle Hyman Collection. In personal correspondences Hyman wrote that he and Rolf Sirnes (1926–2004), a Norwegian seaman, had lived together for fifty years. Hyman described their relationship as a passionate friendship and wrote that Sirnes was his partner.

In March 2026, actor Delroy Lindo, soon after receiving an Academy Award for Best Supporting Actor nomination, tearfully told an interviewer how eternally thankful he was for Earle Hyman having been a "savior" in his life. When Lindo was still a young actor, out of work and feeling "hopeless... at such a low point when Earle gave me that affirmation. He said, 'Young man, you have nothing to worry about.'".

=== Connections to Norway ===
In Norway, Hyman was seen as a friend of the country and had a cabin in Skånevik. Hyman learned to speak Norwegian through Sirnes, who was originally from Haugesund. In the 1990s, they lived in New York City.

== Filmography ==
Film
Year	Title	Role	Notes
1945	The Lost Weekend	Smoking Man	Uncredited
1954	The Bamboo Prison	Doc Jackson, medic	
1966	Afrikaneren	Raymond	Alternative title: The African
1972	The Possession of Joel Delaney	Charles	Credited Earl Hyman
1975	The Super Cops	Police Detective	Uncredited
1979	Julius Caesar	Cicero	
1979	Coriolanus	Cominius	
1982	Fighting Back	Police Chief Freeman	Alternative title: Death Vengeance
1985	Thundercats – HO: The Movie	Panthro	Voice
1987	Light Years	Maxum	Voice, Alternative title: Gandahar

Television
Year	Title	Role	Notes
1957	Hallmark Hall of Fame	Adam	1 episode
1957	The United States Steel Hour	Jim	1 episode
1963	Espionage	Premier Djatuma	1 episode
1963	East Side/West Side	Mr. Marsden	1 episode
1964	The Nurses	Buratta	1 episode
1964	Playdate	Crouch	1 episode
1964	The Defenders	District Attorney	1 episode
1964	Esso World Theater: Nigeria: Culture in Transition	Self	1 episode
1965	Seaway	Tom Nkomo	1 episode
1968	Macbeth	Macbeth	Television movie
1969	Sesame Street	"Big" tuba player	Film about "Big and Little" musician friends, first aired on Episode 16
1980	The Ivory Ape	Inspector St. George	Television movie
1982	Long Day's Journey Into Night	James Tyrone	Television movie
1984	The Edge of Night	Bailiff	Unknown episodes
1984–1992	The Cosby Show	Russell Huxtable	40 episodes
1985	The Life and Adventures of Santa Claus	King Awgwa	Voice, Television movie
1985–1989	ThunderCats	Panthro / Redeye	Voice, 125 episodes
1987	A Different World	Russell Huxtable	Episode: "Sometimes You Get the Bear, Sometimes the Bear Gets You"
1989	A Man Called Hawk	Jefferson Adams	Episode: "Passing the Bar"
1994	Seier'n er vår	Sammy	Unknown episodes
1995	All My Children	Mr. Patterson	Unknown episodes
1996	Hijacked: Flight 285	Wayne Edwards	Television movie
1997	Cosby	Rev. Mitchell	1 episode
2000	The Moving of Sophia Myles	Bishop Heath	Television movie
2001	Twice in a Lifetime	Charley Freeman	Episode: "Moonshine Over Harlem"

== Awards and nominations ==
Year	Award	Result	Category	Film, series or play
1956	Theatre World Award	Won	-	-
1980	Tony Award	Nominated	Best Featured Actor in a Play	The Lady From Dubuque
1983	CableACE Award	Won	Actor in a Dramatic Presentation	Long Day's Journey Into Night
1986	Emmy Award	Nominated	Outstanding Guest Performer in a Comedy Series	The Cosby Show (For episode "Happy Anniversary")
2009	Obie Award for Lifetime Achievement	Won	N/A	n/A
