= List of ThunderCats characters =

The main characters from the original television series. From left to right: Tygra, Snarf, Panthro, Lion-O, WilyKit, Cheetara, and WilyKat.

The following is a list of characters that appear in the American animated series ThunderCats, its 2011 reboot, ThunderCats Roar, and its related media.

== Original ThunderCats ==
=== Lion-O ===
Lion-O (voiced by Larry Kenney in the original series, Will Friedle and Tara Strong (young) in the 2011 series, Max Mittelman in ThunderCats Roar) is the leader of the ThunderCats and is based on the lion, who inherited the position of "Lord of the ThunderCats". He wields the Sword of Omens, which possesses various magical abilities, most notably allowing him to see across great distances with "Sight Beyond Sight", and the Claw Shield, a gauntlet that launches grappling lines from its claws. The Sword was forged from the same star as the Sword of Plundarr, with the Eye of Thundera embedded in its hilt once belonging to a beast who Jaga's ancestors imprisoned in a gem after sacrificing themselves to save the Thunderians from him. Though twelve years old at the time of Thundera's destruction, Lion-O aged to adulthood during the trip to Third Earth when his suspension capsule failed to prevent him from aging. Throughout the series, he matures and learns what it takes to be a true leader.

In the latter half of the first season, he undergoes the "Anointment Trials", consisting of contests of strength, speed, cunning, and intelligence, and the Mutants unsuccessfully attempt to exploit him to leave the ThunderCats without a leader. After defeating Mumm-Ra in the heart of his pyramid, Lion-O is crowned the Lord of the ThunderCats in an inaugural ceremony.

In the 2011 series, Lion-O is a teenager both mentally and physically. Though hotheaded, he is patient and understanding and seeks for the races of Third Earth to be treated equally. Initially, he is the only one to believe that technology, a foreign concept to the ThunderCats, and Mumm-Ra exist. His mother died in childbirth, and his ancestor, Leo, assisted in defeating Mumm-Ra. After Cheetara, who he has feelings for, confesses to Tygra, he attempts to court Pumyra; however, she reveals her loyalty to Mumm-Ra and that she was manipulating him.

In ThunderCats Roar, Lion-O is depicted as being child-like, with his antics annoying the ThunderCats. Lion-S is his long-lost sister.

He is known as León-O in the Spanish version, Leo in the German version, Starlion in the French version, and Lion in the Brazilian version. He was originally known as Lion-L in the English version.

Creators Ted Wolf and Leonard Starr described Lion-O character as being based on "Courage".

=== Panthro ===
Panthro (voiced by Earle Hyman in the original series, Kevin Michael Richardson in the 2011 series, Chris Jai Alex in ThunderCats Roar) is based on the panther. Physically the strongest of the group, he is skilled at martial arts and serves as the chief mechanic/engineer and pilot for the ThunderCats with his knowledge. With help from Tygra, he builds the vehicles the ThunderCats use on Third Earth, such as the ThunderTank, Feliner and ThunderClaw, ThunderStrike, and HoverCat. Despite his loyalty to his friends and duty, living by the ThunderCats warrior code, and calm and collected, he can have a short temper. He wields a pair of nunchaku with open-away cat-paws, and the spikes on his chest bands can be used as projectile weapons or rappelling lines.

In the 2011 series, Panthro is one of Claudus' soldiers, who is sent with his friend Grune to find the Book of Omens. During their search, Grune betrayed Panthro and Mumm-Ra was awakened; in the ensuing struggle, Panthro fell down an abyss and was presumed dead. However, he survived and constructed the ThunderTank, which he uses to save Lion-O's group from Slythe's platoon. He is later revealed to have known Dobo when they were slaves in a gladiator arena called The Pit run by the Dogs, with Dobo coming to resent Pantro when he escaped after learning that they were to face each other in a deathmatch. Though he questions Lion-O's ability to lead, Panthro eventually accepts him as the new king. When Grune and Slither Panthro attack the Elephants' village against Mumm-Ra's orders, he duels with Grune and loses his arms while trapping Grune in the astral plane, with the Berbils later building him mechanical arms.

Creators Ted Wolf and Leonard Starr described Panthro's character as being based on "Physical strength" and "Death".

=== Tygra ===
Tygra (voiced by Peter Newman in the original series, Matthew Mercer in the 2011 series, Patrick Seitz in ThunderCats Roar) is based on the tiger and is calm and analytic, considering every part of the problem before making a decision. He is the ThunderCats' architect and scientist, having created the Cat's Lair and the Tower of Omens, and Lion-O often calls upon him as a second-in-command and for advice. He can create mental illusions and wields whip-like bolas, with which he can become invisible.

In the 2011 series, he is the adopted older brother of Lion-O, who was a member of the Tiger Clan until the other cat clans forced them to live in the frozen mountains far from Thundera due to their loyalty to Mumm-Ra and the Ancient Spirits of Evil. They sent Tygra away from their home in the mountains when the Spirits demanded they slay Tygra in exchange for greater power. His piloting skills come from his ancestors, who served as pilots under Mumm-Ra. Sent to Thundera as a baby by his biological father Javan, Tygra was raised by Claudus and his wife. After her death, having both the right to succeed his foster father and the only mother he knew, Tygra grew to hate Lion-O and questions his decisions after he becomes the new Lord of the ThunderCats. Furthermore, Tygra fell in love with Cheetara when they met as children, though he believed that she never returned his feelings. Tygra and Cheetara become a couple after Cheetara confesses her love for him; soon after, Tygra meets his birth father and inherits his whip.

In ThunderCats Roar, Tygra is depicted as a neat freak. He is known as Tigro in the Spanish, German and French versions. Creators Ted Wolf and Leonard Starr described Tygra's character as being based on "Integrity".

=== Cheetara ===
Cheetara (voiced by Lynne Lipton in the original series, Emmanuelle Chriqui and Grey DeLisle (young) in the 2011 series, Erica Lindbeck in ThunderCats Roar) is based on the cheetah, and the only adult female ThunderCat until Pumyra's introduction. She often serves as a voice of reason and possesses a sixth sense that allows her to feel when danger or evil is near. She also possesses incredible speed, which she can only use for brief periods, and wields a baton that expands into a bō which can grow or shrink in size.

In the WildStorm/DC Comics book series, she marries Tygra and they raise twin cubs. The miniseries ThunderCats: The Return reveals that she was a slave of the mutants during Lion-O's time training in the Book of Omens. Though it hints at romance between her and Lion-O, it also indicates that she came to resent Lion-O for not rescuing her sooner and that her feelings shifted towards Panthro, who is implied to reciprocate her feelings when he and Lion-O rescue her from the Mutants. In 2024, she starred in a solo comic book series.

In the 2011 series, Cheetara is one of the last remaining cleric warriors. As a child, she tried to join the Order of Cleric, but Jaga rejected her due to her impatience. However, after she decided to show Jaga she had the patience by waiting in front of the Order's doors, during which Tygra helped her sustain herself and gave her a flower, he accepted her. She initially serves to support Lion-O, as she does not shun his interest in technology and supports his kindness towards other races. Tygra and Lion-O harbor romantic feelings for her and compete for her love, but she later becomes a couple with Tygra, abandoning her duties as a Cleric to save his life.

In ThunderCats Roar, Cheetara has an athlete personality. She is known as Chitara in the Spanish version, Geparda in the German version, and Félibelle in the French version. Creators Ted Wolf and Leonard Starr described Cheetara's character as being based on "Speed".

=== WilyKit and WilyKat ===
WilyKit (voiced by Lynne Lipton in the original series, Madeleine Hall in the 2011 series, Erica Lindbeck in ThunderCats Roar) and WilyKat (voiced by Peter Newman in the original series, Eamon Pirruccello in the 2011 series, Max Mittelman in ThunderCats Roar) with Kat being the cautious older brother and Kit the adventurous younger sister. Though troublemaking, they can hold their own in combat, as they use tricks and traps and wield slingshots, trick lariats, and capsules, balls and other gimmick weapons carried in pouches and on their belts. They ride on "space boards", flying devices that resemble surfboards.

In the 2011 series, they are younger and were originally from a low-class family in the countryside living with their mother, their father, and their two siblings. After their father died in a tornado, they resolved to run away from home to find the lost city of El Dara and become rich. However, upon arriving in Thundera, they were forced to become street urchins to survive. When the Lizards attack Thundera, they escape and later join the ThunderCats. Like in the original series, WilyKat possesses gimmick weapons, with his primary weapon being a grappling hook called a Flick. WilyKit possesses a Flupe, a special musical instrument that she uses to play a soothing melody that their mother once sung to them and which can put others in trances. During her time with the Elephants, she learned to use it to shatter boulders when in tune with their trumpets. After WilyKit gains a spiritual outlook on life as she and her brother become more involved with the ThunderCats, she assumes Cheetara's role of Cleric. They later acquire hoverboards from the Berbils as well as the Forever Bag, a magic bag once possessed by thieves that has an infinite storage space, activated by the magic word "rankinbass".

In ThunderCats Roar, WilyKit is tomboyish, while WilyKat is the more mature of the duo.

They are known as Felina y Felino in the Spanish version and MiniKit und MiniKat in the German version.

=== Jaga ===
Jaga (voiced by Earl Hammond in the original series, Corey Burton in the 2011 series, Larry Kenney in ThunderCats Roar) is also known as "Jaga the Wise" and is based on the jaguar. Lion-O regards him as the strongest of the ThunderCats. When he was younger, Jaga was the Lord of the ThunderCats and rescued a young Hachiman from the Jade Dragon. He also served as an adviser and protector of the Lord's family, wielding the Sword of Omens. After Claudus was blinded, Jaga became the guardian of the Eye of Thundera, the Sword of Omens, and the Treasure of Thundera. Prior to Thundera's destruction, Jaga gathered the nobles of the ThunderCats to escort Lion-O and the Eye of Thundera to safety, but did not survive the trip to Third Earth due to volunteering to pilot the damaged ship and died of old age. However, he reappears on Third Earth as a ghost to guide Lion-O, who initially is the only one who can see him. After Jaga's physical body is trapped in another dimension "The Astral Prison", Lion-O travels there to rescue him.

In the 2011 series, Jaga serves as head of Thundera's cleric warriors, possessing knowledge of ancient secrets and having the ability of superhuman speed as well as projecting lightning from his staff. In his prime, he wielded the Sword of Omens in a duel against Ratilla. He sacrifices himself to allow Lion-O and his group to escape, resulting in him being tortured into revealing the location of the Book of Omens to Mumm-Ra. After his soul is sealed in a lantern that Jaga later destroys to save Lion-O, his soul resides within the Book of Omens and becomes Lion-O's guide. When Lion-O encounters Jaga in the entrance to the Spirit World, he tells him of the challenges he must undergo to gain a second chance in life. After he fails the final test, Jaga allows Lion-O to return to the living to save the other ThunderCats, even though it would exile his soul to Limbo by sunrise. However, after he saves his friends, Jaga tells him that it was a test and allows him to remain among the living. Jaga's character was described as being based on "Wisdom".

=== Later additions ===
At the start of the series' second season, through Cheetara's powers it is revealed to Lion-O, who had been having a recurring dream of the final moments of Thundera's destruction, that there are more Thunderians living on Third Earth who survived the cataclysm and were rescued by a Ro-Bear Berbil scout ship.

After Mumm-Ra tries to capture them to use as bait to destroy the ThunderCats at Firerock Mountain, they are rescued and brought back to the Cat's Lair, where Lion-O anoints them as new ThunderCats. They initially live in Cat's Lair until after the arrival of the Lunataks, after which they are stationed at the Tower of Omens.

==== Bengali ====
Bengali (voiced by Peter Newman) is one of the two younger Thunderians among the trio, based on the Bengal tiger and resembling the white variant. He is a skilled blacksmith and wields the Hammer of Thundera, which can shoot energy blasts.

==== Lynx-O ====
Lynx-O (voiced by Doug Preis in the original series, Kevin Michael Richardson in the 2011 series) is the oldest of the trio, who is based on the lynx. During Thundera's destruction, he was blinded by a blast of fire and heat and adapted to survive on Third Earth by honing his other senses. His sense of touch allows him to find pressure points on a foe's body to knock them off balance or stun them as well as feel vibrations, which allow him to evade attacks and capture, and he wields a Sonic Reflector. He also possesses a "braille board", which allows him to translate information coming from sensor systems inside the Tower of Omens and see into the gloom of Dark Side.

In the 2011 series, Lynx-O is a general under Claudus.

==== Pumyra ====
Pumyra (voiced by Gerrianne Raphael in the original series, Pamela Adlon in the 2011 series) is a female Thunderian along with Cheetara and WilyKit, and is based on the puma. She is compassionate, pacifistic, and a talented healer and medic, possessing vast knowledge of Thunderian medicine. She is agile, has great leaping ability, and can move in bursts of super-speed. She wields a whipcord and specialized bombs. Later on, she and Tygra stay behind on Third Earth to protect it.

In the 2011 series, Pumyra is a servant of Mumm-Ra, who resurrected her after she was killed during the destruction of Thundera. She resents Lion-O and company for abandoning Thundera while they failed to hear her cries for help. After meeting Lion-O, she earns his trust and love, manipulating him into siding with him, while serving as a beacon for Mumm-Ra to regain the Sword of Plun-Darr and track the ThunderCats. During the siege of Avista, Pumyra reveals her true nature by revealing her loyalty to Mumm-Ra and giving him the Tech Stone. After taking a hit from Ro-Bear Bill and Dobo, Pumyra leaves with Mumm-Ra and promises to kill Lion-O the next time they meet. According to the creators, if there had been a season two, Pumyra would have turned into an insectoid due to her hunger for power.

== Thunderians on Thundera ==
=== Claudus ===
Claudus (voiced by Earl Hammond in the original series, Larry Kenney in the 2011 series, Andrew Morgado in ThunderCats Roar) is the previous Lord of the ThunderCats and Lion-O's father, who lost his sight while fighting in a war against the mutants of Plun-Darr. After Lion-O is transported back in time to Thundera the day before it was destroyed, he rescues Claudus from Slithe and Vultureman, who sought to recover plans for a War-Bot that had fallen into the hands of Claudus's spies, and upon returning to the present uses the plans to destroy the mutants' War-Bot. Believed to have died on Thundera while assisting the royal flagship in taking off, Claudus is later found to have been captured by the Shadowmaster. Through a sequence of nightmares, Lion-O learns from Jaga of his father's imprisonment in the Shadow Realm and rescues him.

In the 2011 series, Claudus is the adoptive father of Tygra, whose wife died in childbirth. He sends Panthro and Grune to find the Book of Omens and breaks up a fight between the ThunderCats and the Lizards before Lion-O convinces him to let the Lizards return to their homeland. After Mumm-Ra murders Claudus, Lion-O, Cheetara, and Tygra hold a funeral pyre for him after escaping with the Sword of Omens.

In ThunderCats Roar, Claudus survives the destruction of Thundera.

== Thunderians on New Thundera ==
In the second season of the original series, Mumm-Ra reforms Thundera to claim the Sword of Plun-Darr. It is here that the heroes discover another ThunderCat and gain additional allies.

=== Jagara ===
Jagara (voiced by Gerrianne Raphael) is based on the jaguar. She is found deep within the core of New Thundera, guarding the gyroscope that keeps it intact. She possesses the powers of levitation, teleportation, and psychokinesis.

=== Thunderian commoners ===
- Torr (voiced by Larry Kenney) – A young Thunderian commoner who the ThunderCats rescue from their dying ship.
- Leah (voiced by Lynne Lipton) – A Thunderian girl whose escape pod was intercepted by Mumm-Ra and landed in the Jungles of Darkness. Her doll was used by the Ancient Spirits of Evil to disguise the Mirror Wraith to infiltrate the Cat's Lair, but the ThunderCats free her from its influence.

== Other Thunderians ==
The following Thunderians appeared in the 2011 series and ThunderCats Roar:

- Leo (voiced by Will Friedle in his first appearance, Jason Marsden in his second appearance) – Exclusive to the 2011 series, he was Lion-O's ancestor and Mumm-Ra's right-hand man, who originally believed in Mumm-Ra's ideals for order across the cosmos until he witnessed the death of the Plun-Darr galaxy. Afterwards, he gathered what remained from the creation of the Sword of Plun-Darr to create the Sword of Omens and defeat Mumm-Ra. In the aftermath of the Black Pyramid's descent to Third Earth, the Stones of Power taken from Mumm-Ra were split among the major races of Third Earth, with Leo keeping the War Stone with the Cats as the Eye of Thundera.
- Panthera (voiced by Cree Summer) – Exclusive to the 2011 series, she was a Thunderian based on the panther and among the Thunderians that worked for Mumm-Ra. As Leo's second-in-command and girlfriend, she tried to convince him to betray Mumm-Ra and start a mutiny.
- Javan (voiced by Robin Atkin Downes) – Exclusive to the 2011 series, he is a Thunderian based on the Javan tiger and the biological father of Tygra. His ancestors were shunned by the other Thunderians, as the Tiger Clan branch of the Thunderians were loyal to Mumm-Ra. When his kin was inflicted with a plague, Javan chose not to turn to Thundera for aid and instead invoked the power of the Ancient Spirits of Evil to save his people. After learning that the price for their survival was the death of his newborn son Tygra, he refused to sacrifice him to honor their pact. As a result, the Ancient Spirits bound the souls of the Tiger Clan to the living world as cursed shadow monsters. While he and Lion-O are in the mountains, Tygra comes across his ancestral home and meets Javan, who he resents for abandoning him. After learning that Caspin and his royal court plan to kill his son, Javan fends them off before the curse takes effect and he attacks Tygra. However, Tygra's act of humility breaks the curse, allowing Javan and his kin to pass on to the next life, and he inherits his whip.
- Caspin (voiced by Jim Cummings) – Exclusive to the 2011 series, he is a Thunderian based on the Caspian tiger. He serves Javan as his right-hand man in his royal court. When Lion-O and Tygra come across the Tiger Clan's cave, Caspin takes them to meet Javan. Caspin attempts to end his people's curse by killing Tygra, and Javan is forced to kill Caspin in self-defense. After the curse is broken, he fades away along with the other Tiger Clan members.
- Lion-S (voiced by Kaitlyn Robrock) - Exclusive to ThunderCats Roar, she is a Thunderian based on the lion. Upon arriving on Third Earth, she met Lion-O, who was unaware that she was an escaped convict from the Gray Penal Planet who Mandora was after. After she stole the Sword of Omens, he allowed her to flee, which gets ThunderCats in trouble with Mandora for aiding an escaped convict. She is later revealed to be Claudus' daughter and Lion-O's sister.

== The Snarfs ==
The Snarfs are sapient cat-like creatures native to Thundera who live in the Valley of Snarfs, with many serving as servants to Thunderian nobility. When Thundera was destroyed, forty-nine Snarfs escaped on a Mutant tanker and reached an uninhabited planet which they took as their own, dubbing it the "Planet of Snarfs". When Mumm-Ra recreates Thundera, he captures the Snarfs and forces them to search for treasure. After it is liberated by the ThunderCats, the Snarfs return home.

Snarfs are incapable of evil, except when possessed, and are resistant to magic and mind-control.

=== Snarf ===
Snarf (voiced by Bob McFadden in the original series, Satomi Kōrogi in the 2011 series) is an elder Snarf who served as a nursemaid and guardian for Lion-O when he was young and remains loyal to him. As Lion-O grew up, Snarf found that often Lion-O did not want to have him "mothering" or protecting him. Still, Snarf has remained loyal to Lion-O and the other ThunderCats. Though not a fighter, he is agile and can communicate with other animals on Third Earth.

In the 2011 series, Snarf is a pet to Lion-O and is incapable of speech. In ThunderCats Roar, he is a robotic animal who can take the form of a normal house cat.

=== Snarfer ===
Snarfer (voiced by Bob McFadden) is a young and excitable Snarf and Snarf's nephew, who escaped Thundera's destruction. He is a keen mechanic and pilot, having been educated at Snarf College while majoring in Snarf-Studies.

=== Snarf Oswald and Snarf Eggbert ===
Snarf Oswald (voiced by Earle Hyman) and Snarf Eggbert (voiced by Larry Kenney) are two Snarfs who survived Thundera's destruction and become the ThunderCats' main Snarf "contacts" on New Thundera.

== Natives of Third Earth ==
=== The Ro-Bear Berbils ===
The Ro-Bear Berbils are robotic bears from the planet Ro-Bear who form other colonies on distant worlds to survive. They are skilled farmers, cooks, and craftsmen, having aided Tygra in building the Cat's Lair and the Tower of Omens. The ThunderCats first encounter them while helping them protect their candy fruit crops from the Trollogs and the Giantors.

In the 2011 series, the Berbils are more bear-like and can roll up into balls. The Berbils encounter the ThunderCats when they help repair the Thunder Tank and give them food. After repairing Ro-Bear-Bill following an attack by the Conqueror, who had been abducting Berbils and selling them as slaves, they help in constructing Panthro's new arms and upgrading the Thunder Tank. Wilykit and Wilykat later recruit the Berbils to help them fight Mumm-Ra and save Avista, after which they begin repairs on it.

- Ro-Bear-Bill (voiced by Earl Hammond in the original series, Dee Bradley Baker in the 2011 series, Dana Snyder in ThunderCats Roar) – A brown Ro-Bear Berbil and the co-leader of the Berbils, who provides the ThunderCats with food and information about Third Earth. After the Mutants and the Lunataks are removed from Third Earth, Bill and Ro-Bear-Belle become members of the League of Third Earth.
- Ro-Bear-Belle – An orange Ro-Bear Berbil and co-leader of the Berbils, who provides the ThunderCats with food and information about Third Earth. After the Mutants and the Lunataks are removed from Third Earth, Belle and Ro-Bear-Bill become members of the League of Third Earth.
- Ro-Bear-Bert – A blue Ro-Bear Berbil who is skilled at agriculture and cooking and saved Lynx-O, Bengali, and Pumyra during Thundera's destruction. However, the ship was damaged and landed on an island on Third Earth, where they lived until they were caught by Hammerhand and his pirates. However, the ThunderCats rescue them.
- Ro-Bear-Bob – A yellow Ro-Bear Berbil who saved Lynx-O, Bengali, and Pumyra during Thundera's destruction. However, the ship was damaged and landed on an island on Third Earth, where they lived until they were caught by Hammerhand and his pirates. However, the ThunderCats rescue them.

=== Warrior Maidens ===
The Warrior Maidens are a race of territorial Amazons who live in the forests of the Tree-Top Kingdom and are always barefoot. They are initially distrustful of the ThunderCats, whom they view as aliens, but come to befriend them.

- Willa and Nayda (both voiced by Lynne Lipton in the original series, Laila Berzins and Cindy Robinson in ThunderCats Roar) – Sisters and members of the Warrior Maidens, as well as skilled archers. Willa is their leader, while Nayda is younger and serves as scout and second-in-command. Though initially distrustful of outsiders, they befriend ThunderCats, and, by their example, the rest of their people come to help them by showing them paths around Third Earth. After the Mutants and the Lunataks are removed from Third Earth, Willa and Nayda join the League of Third Earth.

=== Wolos ===
The Wolos are small, furry people who live in villages and work as farmers, carpenters, and fishermen, using donkeys for transportation.

In the 2011 series, they have rodent-like teeth.

- Ponzi (voiced by Jim Meskimen) – Exclusive to the 2011 series, Ponzi is a traveling scam artist who sells "miracle elixir" that he claims will solve all customers' problems, but has unpredictable side effects. Upon meeting the ThunderCats, Ponzi learns that his elixir has a neutralizing effect on Sycorax and helps them gather Caracara leaves to make a new batch of elixir. Ponzi's caterpillar Lucy eats the leaves, metamorphoses into a butterfly, and crystallizes Sycorax, causing Mumm-Ra to retreat. Soon after, Ponzi and Lucy leave to start their business anew.

=== Bolkins ===
The Bolkins are sheep-like people who work as herdspeople and farmers.

- Bundun and Hurrick (voiced by Bob McFadden) - Two Bolkins who accidentally release the spirit of Grune the Destroyer when they were trying to escape from the bad weather. After Jaga's spirit defeats Grune, the ThunderCats forgive them.

=== Tabbuts ===
The Tabbuts are a race of wealthy yet greedy pig-like traders who often serve as allies of the mutants.

=== Fishmen ===
Exclusive to the 2011 series, the Fishmen are one of the native sentient species of Third Earth and resemble humanoid fish. One group lived in a paradise oasis in the Sand Sea until their home was attacked by Ramlak, which consumed its water. Afterwards, Captain Koinelius Tunar assembled a crew to fulfill his obsession of seeking revenge against Ramlak, a quest which leads them to encounter the ThunderCats. Though Tunar dies, the ThunderCats defeat Ramlak and restore water to their home.

- Captain Koinelius Tunar (voiced by Robin Atkin Downes) – A member of the Fishmen race who seeks revenge against Ramlak, assembling a crew to hunt it down. This leads him to encounter the ThunderCats; though he dies after being dragged into the Sand Sea while harpooning the Ramlak, Lion-O avenges him by killing it.

=== Elephants ===
Exclusive to the 2011 series, the Elephants are a pacifistic grey-skinned race who, along with the other animals, were brought to Third Earth when the Black Pyramid fell. When the ThunderCats encounter their colony while searching for the Warstones, the Elephants reveal that they have a Warstone, but have forgotten its location. After the ThunderCats return from the Forest of Magi Ore, the Elephant village is attacked by Grune and his forces, with the Elephants assisting them in defending it.

- Anet (voiced by Kevin Michael Richardson) – Anet is an ally of the ThunderCats and a high-ranking spiritual leader among the Elephants. After he and Lion-O meet, Anet personally instructs Lion-O in using "Sight Beyond Sight" due to possessing similar precognitive abilities. Anet and some of the Elephants are later recruited by Wilykit and Wilykat to help them fight Mumm-Ra and save Avista.
- Aburn (voiced by Jim Meskimen) – Aburn is a member of the Elephants race and an ally of the ThunderCats. Aburn is the first of the Elephants to speak with the ThunderCats, befriending Wilykit and her brother while overhearing her playing her flute. Grune later holds Aburn hostage to force the ThunderCats to surrender before Tygra saves them with the ThunderTank.

=== Dogs ===
Exclusive to the 2011 series, the Dogs are a species based on various dog breeds. Some harbor bitter feelings towards the Thunderians, while others lived in Thundera's slums as second-class citizens prior to the city's fall. Normally living in the Dog City within the desert, the Dogs own various ramshackle bazaars and bars and run The Pit, a gladiatorial arena that is part of their justice system, as criminals are made slaves to fight against each other in combat until they have either paid their debt with 100 wins or die in battle.

- Jorma (voiced by Corey Burton) – A Dog mechanic and a resident of Thundera's slums, who sells technology to Lion-O at his junk shop. After Thundera's fall, Jorma moves back to Dog City, later reuniting with Lion-O and helping direct the ThunderCats to Avista.
- Dobo (voiced by Fred Tatasciore) – A Dobermann-type Dog who was a thief and paired with Panthro to earn his freedom from The Pit, eventually becoming the new Pit Master. Upon crossing paths with Panthro after acquiring Pumyra from the Rats, Dobo imprisons Lion-O and takes the Sword of Omens, telling Panthro that Lion-O can go free if he defeats Pumyra. During Lion-O's fight with Pumyra, Panthro reveals that he escaped the Pit after learning that he was to fight Dobo and did not want to kill him. When Pumyra is unable to finish off Lion-O, Dobo states that the penalty for forfeit is death. However, the crowd convinces him to spare Lion-O and Pumyra. Dobo is among the Dogs that help Wilykit and Wilykat fight Mumm-Ra and save Avista.
- Dog Constable (voiced by Jim Meskimen) – A Boxer-type Dog and law enforcer in the City of Dogs. They capture Tookit after learning that he was manipulating orphans to do his dirty work.

=== Birds ===
Exclusive to the 2011 series, the Birdmen are a species of humanoid birds who, along with the other animals, were brought to Third Earth when the Black Pyramid fell. They are the most culturally, artistically, and technologically advanced race on Third Earth, living in a democratic society in the treetop Bird Nation, as well as the sky city of Avista. Though hospitable and generous, they are also arrogant, believing that the other Animals are primitive and unsophisticated. In the past, Addicus the Monkey committed crimes against them and was sentenced to death, but was saved by Slithe the Lizard and murdered those present at his intended execution. The ThunderCats later track the Tech Stone to Avista, where Mumm-Ra and the Lizards attack to steal the Tech Stone. After Vultaire defects to Mumm-Ra's side and the city begins to fall due to losing the Stone's anti-gravity emissions, Panthro lands the city safely and the Avistans are grateful to the ThunderCats for saving them. Cheetara promises them that the Berbils would repair their city and return it to the sky.

- Horus – A pigeon-like Bird and Vultaire's attaché.
- Raven Men – The raven-like elite military of Avista, who wield electric spears. Their SkyCutter squadrons are named after birds of prey, such as ospreys and kestrels. They are initially antagonistic to the ThunderCats, treating them like prisoners and trespassers, but come to respect them after they help them save Avista.

=== Other Third Earth Races ===
The following races were also featured throughout the series:

- Brute-Men – A tribe of unintelligent humanoid bovine-like creatures who were enslaved by the Mutants to build Castle Plun-Darr.
- Cavemen – A race of primitives that live on Third Earth. In "The Time Capsule", Lion-O battles a Caveman to claim a Thunderan Time Capsule.
- Crabmen – A territorial race of humanoid crabs that live on Third Earth and reside on the beaches.
- Feerits – A territorial tribe of humanoids that live along the river. In "Lion-O's Anointment Day: The Trial of Speed", Lion-O had an encounter with the Feerits.
- Gargoyles – Winged demon-like humanoids made of stone who serve as guardians and servants. In "The Tower of Traps", a group of Gargoyles reside in the Black Tower, where serve Baron Karnor into stealing from the inhabitants of Third Earth before being destroyed by the ThunderCats. In "The Sound Stones", two Gargoyles work for Sondora and help her guard the Sound Stones.
- Giants – Large human-like beings who live on a cliffside area next to a group of trolls.
- Giantors – Large ogre-like creatures that live atop the mountains and force the Trollogs into hunting the Berbils' candy fruit crops, later attacking their village before the ThunderCats fend them off. In the 2011 series, the Giantors have the Trollogs working for them, but also buy slaves captured by the Conquedor. After Lion-O frees the slaves, Conqueror leads the Giantors and the Trollogs in recapturing the Berbils, but the ThunderCats fend them off.
- Kymeras – A race of robot-like aliens that terrorize the Terators.
- Mermaids – A race of half-human half-fish creatures. In "Turmagar the Tuska", Tygra falls under the spell of a Vampire Mermaid.
- Micrits – A race of tiny humans that live near the Cats' Lair. They are farmers by trade and live in primitive huts. In "The Micrits", after the Micrits' village is run over by the Thunder Tank. When Lion-O later came near their village, the Micrits tied Lion-O up with rope made with Thundranium. Snarf later had to offer himself to them so that Lion-O can help fight off the Mutants. To prevent further destruction of their village, the ThunderCats put up signs around their village to let anyone who passes by know that the Micrits live there. In ThunderCats Roar, the Micrits are led by Emperor Toadius (voiced by Steve Blum) who has a son named Prince Starling (voiced by Cedric L. Williams).
- Molemen – A race of small humanoid moles that live underground. Some of the Molemen were enslaved by Molemaster until Tygra defeats him.
- Mudhogs – A race of humanoid common warthogs that live underground and are blinded by bright lights. They capture Quick Pick and Mandora, planning to feed them to a giant bird, but the ThunderCats drive them away with the Thunder-Tank's lights.
- Petalars – Exclusive to the 2011 series, the Petalars are a race of small flower people that have a lifespan of one day. As their sense of time differs from that of other races, hours seem like years to them. A Petalar named Emrick (voiced by Atticus Shaffer as a child, Patrick Cavanaugh as an adult, James Arnold Taylor as an old man) teaches Lion-O the value of life before dying.
- Snowmen - A savage and proud race of Yeti-like creatures that reside on Hook Mountain.
- Terators – A race of aliens whose homeworld was destroyed by the Kymeras.
- Trolls – Small creatures that ride Hoppers. They live on a cliffside area next to a group of Giants. In "All That Glitters", Mumm-Ra assumes the form of Grygory Grygion to trick Lion-O into attacking Tygra.
- Trollogs – A race of humanoid bulldogs that live in the caves north of the Berbil Village, who the Giantors force to raid the Berbils' candy crops until the ThunderCats stop them from attacking the village. In the 2011 series, the Trollogs are shown buying slaves from Conquedor. After Lion-O frees the slaves, Conqueror leads the Giantors and the Trollogs in recapturing the Berbils, but the ThunderCats fend them off.
- Tuskas - A race of humanoid walruses.
- Under-Earthmen – A group of people that live deep underground and are feared for the knowledge contained within their many books, which they guard fiercely despite years of confinement below ground having robbed them of the ability to read them. In "Lion-O's Anointment Third Day: Trial of Cunning", Lion-O encounters the Under-Earthmen during a test held by Wilykit and Wilykat.

== Allies of Third Earth ==
=== Captain Bragg & Crownan ===
Captain Bragg (voiced by Bob McFadden) is an intergalactic ringmaster and bounty hunter accompanied by the talking crow Crownan. He pilots the Circus Train, a train-like spaceship in which he transports his captives to Wayout Back, and previously traveled to Third Earth and befriended Wilykat. Bragg uses his showmanship to capture the Mutants and the Lunataks when they are transported to him by the Ancient Spirits of Evil following Mumm-Ra's defeat against Lion-O. He later becomes an ally of the ThunderCats.

=== Dr. Dometome ===
Dr. Dometome (voiced by Bob McFadden in the original series, Trevor Devall in ThunderCats Roar) is a scientist and the guardian of the Great Oceanic Plug, an engineering project built to seal a crack in the ocean floor and prevent the planet's oceans from flooding its core. He is the pilot of Hercules, a frog robot used to guard the sea floor.

=== Hachiman ===
Hachiman (voiced by Peter Newman) is a samurai from Ancient Japan who is summoned to Third Earth by Mumm-Ra and tricked into fighting Lion-O. Because of his code of Bushido, he becomes an ally to the ThunderCats and the Warrior Maidens. He wields The Thunder-Cutter, a katana-like sword. Hachiman has saved the lives of various ThunderCats on multiple occasions. Hachiman maintains a friendship with Lion-O after they first join forces. During the race to rescue Pumyra, Ben-Gali, and Lynx-O during ThunderCats- HO!, he is tricked into attacking the ThunderCats by Mumm-Ra. However, he realizes that he has been deceived and sides with the ThunderCats. In his final appearance, Hachiman is shown to be living on his own planet, which resembles ancient Japan.

=== Mandora ===
Mandora (voiced by Lynne Lipton in the original series, Erica Lindbeck in ThunderCats Roar) is an intergalactic police officer who works with law enforcers to protect the galaxy. She works in part to run the Great Penal Planet—which houses some of the galaxy's nastiest criminals—and routinely comes to Third Earth as part of her patrols. When one of these criminals, the robotic pickpocket Quick Pick, helps her and Lion-O fight Captain Cracker, she makes him an Evil Chaser assistant. She travels on a specially equipped hoverbike called the Electro-Charger. After the Mutants and the Lunataks are removed from Third Earth, Mandora joins the League of Third-Earth.

=== Mumm-Rana ===
Mumm-Rana (voiced by Lynne Lipton in the original series, Kaitlyn Robrock in ThunderCats Roar) is an ancient sorceress and counterpart of Mumm-Ra. She lives in the White Pyramid where her powers, apparently bestowed upon her by "the Ancient Spirits of Goodness", prevent her from traveling too far. In the past, she fought Queen to stop her rampage across Third Earth and stripped her of her magical belt.

=== Snowman ===
The Snowman of Hook Mountain (voiced by Earl Hammond in the original series, Dave B. Mitchell in ThunderCats Roar) is a yeti-like knight and ruler of the Kingdom of the Snowmen. He fights Lion-O for possession of a meteor that fell onto the Kingdom's slopes before befriending him when he saves him from a Mutant attack. He can craft weapons out of ice, seemingly at will, and has a snow cat, Snowmeow, who serves as his mount. After the Mutants and the Lunataks are removed from Third Earth, Snowman joins the League of Third Earth.

=== Sondora ===
Sondora (voiced by Gerrianne Raphael) is the Keeper of the Mystical Soundstones, who assists the ThunderCats when Vultureman steals one of her stones to create a sonic weapon for the Lunataks. After Lion-O recovers the stolen Soundstone, Sondora leaves to take the stones to another dimension.

=== Turmagar ===
Turmagar (voiced by Earl Hammond) is the leader of the Tuska Warriors, who live near the source of the river that serves as Third Earth's natural water supply. He is a skilled warrior and pilot and aids the ThunderCats with air support before they craft their own air-vehicles. In his self-titled episode, Turmagar comes to the ThunderCats for help against the Technopede. In "Catfight", Mumm-Ra disguises himself as Turmagar to incite in-fighting between the original ThunderCats and the new ones.

=== Unicorn Keepers ===
The Unicorn Keepers (male voiced by Bob McFadden, female voiced by Lynne Lipton) are humanoids who serve as the caretakers of the Unicorn Forest and guardians of its unicorns. They first appear in "The Terror of Hammerhand" where they befriend the ThunderCats and ask for help in stopping Hammerhand and his pirates from poaching the unicorns. In "The Time Capsule", the female Unicorn Keeper tells Lion-O of the Black Widow Shark, which dwells in the River of Despair, and uses a crystal to form the Bridge of Light that allows him to cross the river. In "Snarf Takes up the Challenge", the female Unicorn Keeper and Robear Bill tell Snarf that the other ThunderCats have been captured by the Mutants and handed over to Mumm-Ra.

=== Wizz-Ra ===
Wizz-Ra (voiced by Larry Kenney) is a wizard from ancient Egypt who was banished to the 7th Dimension after losing a battle to Mumm-Ra, who framed him for damaging the face of the Great Sphinx. His helmet has the ability of mind-control and is sought by Mumm-Ra after it is discovered that the wall of the 7th Dimension has weakened after 7,000 years. He aids the ThunderCats after they help him to recover his helmet before being forced to return to the 7th Dimension.

== Allies of New Thundera ==
=== Char ===
Char (voiced by Bob McFadden) is a four-armed alien garbage scavenger and blacksmith who encounters Snarf while he is bringing the Sword of Omen's pieces to Ben-Gali and attempts to take the Sword of Omens for himself. In "The Heritage", Char, along with WilyKit and WilyKat, fall under the evil influence of an evil golden orb which is Mumm-Ra's lost Golden Sphere of Setti.

=== Screwloose ===
Screwloose is a robot whom the ThunderCats enlist to assist Jagara in repairing the Gyroscope. Mumm-Ra replaces Screwloose's brain module with one of his own creation, causing the robot to alternate between good and evil behavior. After he tries to destroy the gyroscope and kill Jagara, Lion-O uses the Sword of Omens to restore Screwloose. During the ensuing battle with Mumm-Ra, Screwloose defeats him by taking the Sword of Plun-Darr and decides to stay on New Thundera to help Jagara maintain the gyroscope.

== Villains ==
=== Mumm-Ra ===
Mumm-Ra (voiced by Earl Hammond in the original series, Robin Atkin Downes in the 2011 series, Patrick Seitz in ThunderCats Roar) is the main antagonist of the series, a demon-priest and servant to the Ancient Spirits of Evil who provide him with his powers so he can spread their dark influence throughout Third Earth.

Mumm-Ra exists in a decayed, mummified form that must return to a stone sarcophagus to replenish his energy. He can transform into a stronger form—Mumm-Ra, the Ever-Living—by reciting the incantation "Ancient Spirits of Evil, transform this decayed form… to Mumm-Ra, the Ever-Living!", and has the power of shapeshifting. He cannot truly be killed, as, even if his body is destroyed, he will be restored.

In some episodes, Mumm-Ra has an even more powerful form, "Mumm-Ra the All-Powerful", in which he absorbs the power of the Ancient Spirits of Evil. In another incarnation, he invokes "the Ancient Spirits of the Dream World" to transform into "Mumm-Ra the Dream Master", who can manipulate dreams.

After the Ancient Spirits of Evil grow disappointed with Mumm-Ra's repeated failures, they demand that he destroys the ThunderCats; after he fails, they trap him within a planar crystal and cast him away from Third Earth. When the ThunderCats decide to colonize and rebuild New Thundera, the Ancient Spirits of Evil free Mumm-Ra and rebuild his pyramid there. He also possesses the Golden Sphere of Setti, and sought to use its power to free himself from the Spirits' servitude. After they learn of his plan, he admits that he cannot survive without the pyramid and surrenders the Golden Sphere of Setti to them.

In the 2011 series, Mumm-Ra himself is an Ancient Spirit of Evil who seeks to conquer the universe. Centuries prior to the events of the series, he used advanced technology and magic to enslave the ancestors of the ThunderCats and the Animals. He sought to have them gather the Four Powerstones for the Sword of Plun-Darr, a weapon forged from a star he had collapsed, causing the destruction of the Plun-Darr galaxy. However, Leo took the Warstone, which would become the Eye of Thundera, and rebelled against Mumm-Ra, defeating him and stripping him of the other Powerstones. After his pyramid spacecraft crashed on Third Earth, he was trapped within the pyramid as the stones and survivors spread across Third Earth. Centuries later, Mumm-Ra uses Grune to release him from his prison and plans Thundera's downfall, recruiting Grune and Slythe, as well as Pumrya after her resurrection, to obtain the Eye of Thundera and other three Powerstones. After Grune is trapped in the Astral Plane, Mumm-Ra has Slithe recruit the Addicus and Kaynar to restore the Lizard army's morale. Through a calculated scheme involving his agent Pumyra, Mumm-Ra regains the Sword of Plun-Darr and the Tech Stone while gaining a new ally in Vultaire.

==== Ma-Mutt ====
Ma-Mutt is a demonic Bulldog and Mumm-Ra's pet, who has the powers of flight, shapeshifting, and enhanced strength.

=== Ancient Spirits of Evil ===
The Ancient Spirits of Evil (voiced by Earle Hyman in the original series, Jim Cummings and Kevin Michael Richardson in the 2011 series, Chris Jai Alex in ThunderCats Roar) are four dark spirits summoned by Mumm-Ra who serve as his masters, representing the incarnation of malicious evil. They communicate with him through the cauldron and anthropomorphic statues of a boar, vulture, crocodile, and ox, as they cannot interact with the physical realm outside of the Black Pyramid except through avatars.

In the 2011 series, the statues instead resemble a lizard, a jackal, a monkey, and a vulture. The Ancient Spirits played a role in the creation of the Sword of Plun-Darr, possessing a Thunderian blacksmith to forge the weapon, and the Sword of Omens, due to the blacksmith retaining the spirits' knowledge to forge a weapon similar to the previous creation. They were worshipped by the Tiger Clan after their ancestors were driven off to the mountains due to their loyalty to Mumm-Ra. When the Tiger Clan was on the verge of dying out from an epidemic, the spirits offered to cure them in return that the newborn Tygra be sacrificed. When Javan refused to honor his end of the pact, the Ancient Spirits bound the souls of the Tiger Clan to the living world as shape-shifting shadow monsters that obey their command. Some years later, Tygra returns to his ancestral home and frees his kin of the curse.

The Ancient Spirits of Evil also appear in ThunderCats Roar.

=== The Mutants ===
The Mutants are the first villains to appear in the series, being long-time enemies of the Thunderians that originate from the planet Plun-Darr and unsuccessfully attempted to invade Thundera. After Thundera's destruction, they pursued the survivors and attempted to obtain the Eye of Thundera before crash-landing on Third Earth, where Mumm-Ra recruited them. They are skilled with technology, as they build a fortress, which they called Castle Plun-Darr after their homeworld, and salvage equipment from their spaceship to build weapons and vehicles that they could use on Third Earth. They are later joined by Ratar-O, a general in the mutant armies.

In the 2011 series, they are known as Animals, which their surviving ancestors brought to Third Earth after aiding Lion-O's ancestor Leo in defeating Mumm-Ra. However, while four of the races obtained a stone that made them each a power, the other animals were outmatched by the Cats and pitted against each other until the Lizards managed to salvage lost technology and ransacked Thundera with help from Mumm-Ra and Grune.

The Mutants appear in ThunderCats Roar, with Ratar-O as their leader.

==== Jackalman ====
Jackalman (voiced by Larry Kenney in the original series, Dee Bradley Baker in the 2011 series, Andrew Kishino in ThunderCats Roar) is based on the jackal. He is the pilot of the Skycutter and wields axes in combat.

In the 2011 series, his real name is Kaynar. He was to be placed in solitary confinement in a Dog prison until Slithe recruits him to join Mumm-Ra's services. Though preferring his cell, Kaynar accepts Slithe's proposal when he mentions that he can slaughter ThunderCats while allowed to "say goodbye" to his jailers. Prior to his debut, Kaynar's race appeared in "Legacy", where a Jackalman named Shen (voiced by Rob Paulsen) assisted Leo and Panthera in overthrowing Mumm-Ra.

He is known as Chacalo in the Spanish and Jackalman (شغال) in the Persian version.

==== Slithe ====
Slithe/Slythe (voiced by Bob McFadden in the original series, Dee Bradley Baker in the 2011 series, Trevor Devall in ThunderCats Roar) is the cunning leader of the Reptilians (referred to as Lizards in 2011 series) and the pilot of the Nosediver, who commands them through strength. Slithe once served as Ratar-O's cook. In "Fond Memories", Slithe was among the formidable opponents of Lion-O that Mumm-Ra had a portrait set up in a gallery trap for Lion-O. Mumm-Ra used a bomb from Slithe's portrait.

In the 2011 series, though a descendant of the Lizards that he enslaved, Slithe serves Mumm-Ra so his kind can take revenge on the Thunderians for generations of persecution and war. After ransacking Thundera, Slithe pursues Lion-O's group before overseeing the search for the Book of Omens and the Warstones, later disobeying Mumm-Ra's orders and attacks the Elephant village along with Grune. In "Legacy", it was revealed that a Lizard named Rezard (voiced by Rob Paulsen) assisted Leo and Panthera in overthrowing Mumm-Ra. In "New Alliances", several of the Lizards who worked for Slithe desert Mumm-Ra, causing Slithe to prosecute any that he catches while recruiting Kaynar and Addicus to Mumm-Ra's services.

He is known as Reptílio in the Spanish version and Escamoso in the Brazilian version.

===== Khamai =====
Khamai (voiced by James Arnold Taylor) is a chameleon-like lizard who appears in the 2011 TV series. He leads a special squad of Lizards and works closely with Slithe before Lion-O kills him.

===== Kask =====
Kask (voiced by Matthew Mercer) is a Lizard who appears in the 2011 TV series. He serves as Slithe's scout lieutenant.

===== Sauro =====
Sauro (voiced by Kevin Michael Richardson) is a Lizard who appears in the 2011 TV series. He serves as Slithe's scout.

==== Monkian ====
Monkian (voiced by Peter Newman in the original series, Robin Atkin Downes in the 2011 series, Jim Meskimen in ThunderCats Roar) is the leader of the Simians, a race of ape men. He has an aggressive and unstable behavior when attacking the Thundercats. Monkian pilots a Skycutter and wields a flail and projectile-firing shield.

In the 2011 series, his real name is Addicus. He is a barbarian who committed crimes against the Bird Nation and was sentenced to death until Slithe rescued him and recruited him to Mumm-Ra's services, which he agreed to in order to get revenge on the Bird Nation.

He was renamed "Mandrilo" in the Spanish version.

==== Vultureman ====
Vultureman (voiced by Earl Hammond in the original series, Michael McKean in the 2011 series, Dana Snyder in ThunderCats Roar) is a vulture-like crafty, who serves as inventor for the jackalman and Mutants, but is often blamed when his devices or machines fail to live up to Slithe's expectations. Later on, he decides to work for his own gains and often strikes solo deals with Mumm-Ra. Sometimes he is very cowardly so his behavior makes him fail. He pilots a vulture-styled Flying Machine and wields a crossbow-like weapon, also commanding vehicles like the Mutank and Thundrainium Cannon.

In the 2011 series, he is known as Vultaire and is a prefect of Avista, whose ancestors were entrusted with the Tech Stone by Leo and used its power to build Avista and keep it afloat. Unlike the original Vultureman, Vultaire is shown to have wings on his back like his fellow Birds. Like many of his kind, Vultaire is arrogant and sees himself above those who live on the land, especially the ThunderCats, whom he considers to be manipulative barbarians. When the ThunderCats arrive to Avista for the Tech Stone, Vultaire accepts Tigra's challenge for the item to obtain the two stones in his group's possession, but upon losing refuses to honor his end of the deal and places the ThunderCats under house arrest. Pumrya holds him hostage to gain access to the Tech Stone, but he escapes before helping the ThunderCats fight Mumm-Ra's army. However, he betrays his fellow Avistans and allies with Mumm-Ra upon witnessing his power firsthand.

He is known as Buítro in the Spanish version.

==== Ratar-O ====
Ratar-O (voiced by Bob McFadden in the original series, Carlo Rota in the 2011 series, Crispin Freeman in ThunderCats Roar) is a rat-like general in the Mutant armies who pilots the Ratstar and wields the Rat's Eye, a pair of daggers. He comes to Third Earth to aid the Vultureman in defeating the ThunderCats. Though he crash-lands, he salvages parts to make a Mutank. Ratar-O is a descendant of Ratilla the Terrible, a former wielder of Sword of Plun-Darr. In "Fond Memories", Ratar-O is among the formidable opponents of Lion-O that Mumm-Ra had a portrait set up in a gallery trap for Lion-O. He was able to defeat this copy of Ratar-O.

In the 2011 series, Ratar-O is the dictator of the Rats and a descendant of Ratilla, who found the Sword of Plun-Darr after the Animals ended up on Third Earth. While under Mumm-Ra's services, the Rats served as janitors within the Black Pyramid before becoming scavengers on Third Earth. After the Sword of Plun-Darr corrupted Ratilla's mind, Jaga was forced to kill him and sealed it away in what would become Mount Plun-Darr. Ratar-O buys the Thunderian survivors from the Lizards to use as slaves to find the Sword of Plun-Darr due to the curse Jaga placed on it, which kills those who attempt to retrieve it. When the ThunderCats raid Mount Plun-Darr as Tygra and Cheetara pose as slaves to get the sword, Lion-O's group is captured by Mordax and turned over to Ratar-O. However, after Tygra and Cheetara found the Sword of Plun-Darr, it causes Mount Plun-Darr to collapse and destroys Ratar-O's palace. He battles Lion-O, but retreats underground after losing.

In ThunderCats Roar, Ratar-O is the leader of the Mutants, who fought Jaga. While in space, he reclaims the Sword of Plun-Darr some time after Thundera's destruction. When he arrives on Third Earth and gets Slithe, Jackalman, Monkian, and Vultureman on his side, Ratar-O fights the ThunderCats wielding the Sword of Omens, but they defeat him and throw it into outer space.

===== Mordax =====
Mordax (voiced by Kevin Michael Richardson) is Ratar-O's maltreated second-in-command who appears in the 2011 series. When the ThunderCats raid Mount Plun-Darr, Lion-O stops Pumyra from killing Mordax. which Mordax takes advantage of to take Lion-O, Pumyra, and Panthro prisoner and hand them over to Ratar-O. Mordax later turns against Ratar-O, refusing to kill Lion-O and returning the Sword of Omens to him before fleeing.

=== The Lunataks ===
Hailing from the Moons of Plun-Darr and dwelling in Dark Side, a volcanic region on the far side of Fire-Rock Mountains, the Lunataks were feared criminals in ancient times until Mumm-Ra encased them in molten rock when they attempted to take control of Third Earth. Mumm-Ra later had the Mutants release them on the condition that they work for him to battle the ThunderCats. However, the Lunataks instead form their own "third column" based in Dark Side, where they build a floating fortress called Sky Tomb.

==== Luna ====
Luna (voiced by Lynne Lipton) is a dwarf sorceress who is the cruel leader and chief strategist of the Lunataks. Because of her small size, she is carried around and cared for by Amok. She recovers the magical belt once worn by her grandmother, Queen Luna, and uses it to grow in size, but returns to normal after it is destroyed.

==== Amok ====
Amok (voiced by Earl Hammond) is Luna's loyal servant and bodyguard who serves as her mode of transportation.

==== Alluro ====
Alluro (voiced by Doug Preis) is a master of deception, mind games, and psychological warfare who wields the Psyche-Club. The crystal ball launched from it focuses his mental powers onto a foe, allowing him to manipulate their minds with illusions or command them to do his bidding.

==== Tug Mug ====
Tug Mug (voiced by Bob McFadden) is a Lunatak from one of Plun-Darr's moons with strong gravity, who became more powerful in the lesser gravity of Third Earth. He can use his tripod "legs" to leap great distances, and possesses immense physical strength. He wields a "gravity carbine", whose gravitation beams can alter the gravity of a living being or object.

==== Chilla ====
Chilla (voiced by Gerrianne Raphael) is a female Lunatak from the ice moon of Plun-Darr who controls fire and ice.

==== Red-Eye ====
Red-Eye (voiced by Earle Hyman) is a Lunatak from the misty moon of Plun-Darr and loyal follower of Luna. He has enhanced vision capabilities that allow him to see things in infrared and detect Tygra's invisibility and wields a spinning discus that is stored in his armored chest plate. He often serves as the engineer and pilot of Sky Tomb.

=== The Berserkers ===
The Berserkers are a band of Viking-like pirates. The original Berserkers resembled Vikings and were seemingly killed when their ship was sunk. A revived Hammerhand later forms a second incarnation of the Berserkers with new members endowed with cybernetic bodies and powers, with Mumm-Ra recruiting them.

In ThunderCats Roar, the Berserkers are shown to work for whoever can pay them in gold.

The Berserkers consist of:

- Hammerhand (voiced by Earl Hammond in the original series, Trevor Devall in ThunderCats Roar) – The leader of the Berserkers, who has a cybernetic arm. After he and his original Berserkers were killed, Hammerhand was later resurrected by Mumm-Ra, who summoned up his spirit to animate a clone of Panthro. When the plan fails, Hammerhand's spirit breaks free from Mumm-Ra's control and the clone body returns to normal.
- Topspinner (voiced by Bob McFadden in the original series, Erica Lindbeck in ThunderCats Roar) – A warrior and member of Hammerhand's second incarnation of the Berserkers, who can spin at high speeds to deflect missile objects or attack.
- Ram Bam (voiced by Peter Newman in the original series, Dana Snyder in ThunderCats Roar) – A member of Hammerhand's second incarnation of the Berserkers. Rolling by the wheel embedded in his chest, he can launch himself along the ground at high speeds, aided by the rollers on his feet.
- Cruncher (voiced by Earle Hyman in the original series, Chris Jai Alex in ThunderCats Roar) – A hulking pirate and member of Hammerhand's second incarnation of the Berserkers, who possesses immense physical strength.

=== Grune the Destroyer ===
Grune the Destroyer (voiced by Bob McFadden in the original series, Clancy Brown in the 2011 series, Thundercat in ThunderCats Roar) is a Thunderian based on the saber-toothed tiger, who wields a mace and possesses immense physical strength. He was a ThunderCat noble and friend of Jaga. However, his desire for power and greed led him to betray the ThunderCats and fight Jaga, who banished him into space; after his spacecraft landed on Third Earth, he terrorized its natives until he was defeated and sealed in a tomb. In "Ghost Warrior", he is freed after two Bolkins accidentally release his spirit and attacks the ThunderCats in search of Thundranium, which he uses to forge a new mace. After attacking the ThunderCats to draw out Jaga, he defeats him temporarily, but Jaga in turn is granted Lion-O's strength and the Sword of Omens in order to decisively conquer his old friend again. Mumm-Ra later summons him to prevent Jaga's spirit from obtaining the Star of Thundera and freeing Pumyra, Ben-Gali, and Lynx-O from the Mutant prisons at Fire-Rock Mountain. Though he breaks the Sword of Omens and chains Lion-O and Cheetara on the Churning Rocks, Char repairs the Sword and Lion-O frees himself and Cheetara, banishing him back to Third Earth after activating the ThunderCat signal.

In the 2011 series, Grune is one of Claudus' trusted warriors, who was friends with Panthro until Claudus promoted Lynx-O to general and assigned Grune and Panthro to find the Book of Omens. Mumm-Ra used his feelings of being betrayed and jealousy towards the king to convince him to join him. However, Grune intended to betray Mumm-Ra prior to leading the attack on the Elephants' village to obtain the spirit stone there, and Panthro traps him in the Astral Plane. Had the series continued, Grune was intended to return at least once in a spirit-like form, echoing his 1985 counterpart.

In ThunderCats Roar, Grune attempts to overthrow Claudus due to him being a bad ruler, but Jaga traps him in a crystal prison and ejects it into outer space.

=== Other villains ===
- Amortus (voiced by Peter Newman) – A being who Mumm-Ra imprisoned in The Land of No Return, but was freed in exchange for killing Lynx-O. Amortus afflicts Lynx-O with the Touch of Amortus, which causes him to suffer from delusions of persecution. After he travels to The Land of No Return to confront the source of the hallucinations, he is inflicted with a deadlier Touch of Amortus that turns him to stone. However, Lion-O cures his teammates and temporarily revives those he had turned to stone, who defeat him. Mumm-Ra banishes Amortus as punishment for his failures.
- Baron Tass (voiced by Peter Newman) – A Thunderian baron who arrives on New Thundera in "Well of Doubt". After Lion-O forbids him from cashing in on old debts, he discovers the Well of Doubt and gives its water to Lion-O and Jagara, causing them to be filled with doubt. When he attacks the ThunderCats with stone statues, Lion-O overcomes the effects of the Well of Doubt and defeats them, he promises to change his ways and seals off the Well's entrance.
  - Mr. Grubber (voiced by Bob McFadden) – A Thunderian and Baron Tass's bookkeeper.
- Boatman – A hooded boatman who appears in "Lion-O's Anointment Final Day: The Trial of Evil" and attempts to stop Lion-O from traveling down the River of Doom.
- Burnout (voiced by Bob McFadden) – A robot criminal who Lion-O accidentally releases in "Mandora the Evil Chaser" and helps Mandora recapture.
- Captain Cracker (voiced by Earl Hammond) – A robotic space pirate who commands a starship named the Jolly Rogers. In "Mandora and the Pirates", he raids the Great Penal Planet to release a criminal contingent to help him take over the space-ways, in "Exile Isle", he and the Lunataks team up to plan a return to Third Earth, and in "Cracker's Revenge", he lands on Way Outback and frees the Lunataks to help him attack Third Earth.
  - Polly (voiced by Bob McFadden) - Captain Cracker's pet robotic parrot.
- Captain Shiner (voiced by Bob McFadden) – A canine mercenary who commands a starship named The Vertus and its crew. Though Mumm-Ra occasionally recruits him, he helps the ThunderCats escape from a black hole.
- Charr-Nin – A genie who was released from the Great Golden Harp by Wilykit and Wilykat in "The Evil Harp of Charr-Nin".
- Child of Gorgon – An evil giant that appears in "The Mask of Gorgon". It was imprisoned in stone thousands of years ago, with the formation becoming the Hills of Elfshima. Mumm-Ra awakens it by using the Sword of Omens' Sight beyond Sight on the Mask of Gorgon, but it is destroyed along with the Mask.
- Conquedor (voiced by Jon Polito) – Exclusive to the 2011 series, Conquedor is a robotic villain who captures Berbils to sell to the highest bidder. After the ThunderCats crash his auction and free the Berbils and other creatures in his possession, he leads the Giantors and the Trollogs to attack the Berbils, but is defeated.
- Demolisher (voiced by Peter Newman) – A canine being who travels the galaxy in search of worthy opponents to battle. It lands on Third Earth to battle Mumm-Ra, who convinces it to battle Lion-O. After being defeated, it leaves in shame.
  - Dirge - An armadillo-like pilot/cheerleader of Demolisher who plays his drums.
- Driller (voiced by Bob McFadden in the original series, Matthew Mercer in the 2011 series, Stephen Tobolowsky in ThunderCats Roar) – A metallic demon who has a drill in place of legs and changeable drill bits on his head. His services are for hire, with his chief price is diamonds, which he needs to keep his drill points sharp. He is hired by various villains.
- Duelist (voiced by Miguel Ferrer) – Exclusive to the 2011 series, the Duelist is a professional swordsman who claims the swords of his defeated opponents, including the Sword of Hittanzo, which he claimed from its creator, Hittanzo (voiced by Stephen Root). He challenges Lion-O to a sword match, with the Sword of Omens as its wager. Though the Duelist wins the sword, Lion-O reclaims it with help from Hittanzo while disarming the Duelist of his swords. When the Duelist tries to attack Lion-O, Hittanzo intervenes and drives the Duelist out of town.
- Enflamer (voiced by Bob McFadden) – A creature with mastery over fire whose powers were drained following a mutant attack. The ThunderCats seek him out to reforge the Sword of Omens before defeating him after he turns on them.
- Frog Man (voiced by Earl Hammond) – A humanoid frog from another planet who crash-landed on Thundera centuries ago after his planet's water dried out. He attempted to destroy the planet with a flood to claim it as his own, but was imprisoned by the Thunderians after his fight with Jaga. On New Thundera, he is accidentally freed by WilyKit and WilyKat and pretends to be their friend before betraying them and attempting to sink the Cat's Lair. Lion-O was confused on why the Sword of Omens showed him Frog Man with WilyKit and WilyKat until Jaga told him his history with Frog Man. Amidst Frog Man's plot, Lion-O defeats and imprisons him.
- Ice King – An ancient king from one thousand years ago who appears in the episode "Secret of the Ice King". He emerges from a melted glacier and attacks the Snowmen, freezing the ThunderCats except for Cheetara. She thaws them using the Sword of Omens and they help him after learning that he is searching for an ancient egg so he can see his wife one last time before he dies.
- Mad Bubbler (voiced by Bob McFadden) – A reptilian phantom that inhabits the Hook Mountain thundrilium mines.
- Malcar (voiced by Bob McFadden) – An ancient alchemist whom Mumm-Ra summons from the dead in Tomb Town to transmute Thundrillium into Thundranium. However, he is revived as an old man, so Mumm-Ra sends him to the Canyons of Youth to restore his youth. After he is left in the Canyon due to Jaga's interference, he reverts to an infant and is adopted by a Thunderian couple who arrived on New Thundera.
- Mirror Wraith (voiced by Peter Newman) - A demon who the Ancient Spirits of Evil summon to help Mumm-Ra when a pod containing Leah crash-lands in the Jungles of Darkness. Mumm-Ra disguises Mirror Wraith as a doll and gives it to Leah so that he can get into the Cats' Lair. However, Snarf and Leah defeat him by using fire extinguishers to cover up the mirrors he hides behind. This sends the Mirror Wraith back to Mumm-Ra as the Ancient Spirits of Evil teleport Mirror Wraith away.
- Molemaster (voiced by Bob McFadden) – A moleman who enslaved the other mole people to work in his tunnels before being defeated Tygra. He later returns in "Jackalman's Rebellion", where he teams up with Jackalman and Driller.
- Mongor (voiced by Bob McFadden in the original series, Andrew Morgado in ThunderCats Roar) – A demonic goat-like being who feeds on fear. After the ThunderKittens accidentally free Mongor, he attacks the ThunderCats before being defeated after they discover that his powers do not work if they do not look at him.
- Nemex (voiced by Earle Hyman) – An imp-like creature of the Netherworld who captures Jaga in "The Astral Prison".
- Ninja (voiced by Earl Hammond) – An unnamed ninja who appears in "The Thunder-Cutter". He was summoned by Mumm-Ra to defeat Hachiman after his deception is revealed. He is defeated by Hachiman, and vanishes, never to be seen again.
- Plutar (voiced by Peter Newman) – A criminal from the dark planet Onyx who Lion-O accidentally releases in "Mandora the Evil Chaser" before he and Mandora recapture him.
- Pyron – A warrior and the champion of the Ancient Spirits of Evil who they summon into the Book of Omens in "The Book of Omens". He is defeated by Lion-O with help from the dragon heads wrapped around the pillars near the Book of Omens' entity.
- Queen Tartara (voiced by Lynne Lipton) – A selfish queen with crystal-based abilities who attempts to steal the Arrietta bird from the Ro-Bear Berbils so it can sing for her. She can imprison anyone in a crystal. When Panthro and the Thundertank caused her castle to collapse, it can be assumed that Queen Tartrara perished.
- Quick Pick (voiced by Bob McFadden) – A robotic pickpocket and escape artist who Lion-O accidentally releases in "Mandora the Evil Chaser" before they recapture him after the ThunderCats save them from the Mudhogs. In "Mandora and the Pirates", he is among the inmates in the Gray Penal Planet who is released by Captain Cracker and helps the ThunderCats defeat him.
- Rhino – A Rhinosauran (a rhinoceros-headed gorilla alien) criminal who was incarcerated on the Gray Penal Planet. In "Mandora and the Pirates", Captain Cracker and his crew invade the Grey Prison Planet and free Rhino to help him capture Mandora. It was mentioned that Rhino's planet of Rhinosauria was once attacked by Mumm-Ra.
- Safari Joe (voiced by Larry Kenney in the original series, Trevor Devall in ThunderCats Roar) – An intergalactic big-game hunter. Having hunted some big cats, sky cats, and aqua cats, he ventures to Third Earth to hunt the ThunderCats and uses different tactics stating with shooting the darts into WilyKit and WilyKat's hoverboards. Then Safari Joe does other traps like using energy bolts on Cheetara, taking advantage of Tygra being unable to swim, and making use of Panthro's fear of bats. Lion-O defeats him as it is shown that Safari Joe is brave behind his various hunting weapons. Lion-O makes him promise to never hunt again as he leaves Third-Earth. In "Fond Memories", Mumm-Ra creates a gallery trap for Lion-O with Safari Joe being one of the portraits of Lion-O's formidable opponents along with Slithe, Ratar-O, and Spidera. A clone of Safari Joe emerged from his portrait and fought Lion-O before retreating back to his portrait.
  - Mule (voiced by Bob McFadden) - Safari Joe's train-headed robotic assistant. He helps him gather information on his prey using the Holojector. When Safari Joe was defeated by Lion-O, Panthro reprogrammed Mule to make sure Safari Joe doesn't hunt again.
- Scrape (voiced by Bob McFadden) – A salvage expert from the planet Blue Plunder. In "Dr. Dometone", Scrape comes to Thundera under orders from his superiors to mine a certain rock. However, this would require him to remove the Great Oceanic Plug, which brings him into conflict with the Dr. Dometone and the ThunderCats. With help from Dr. Dometone, the ThunderCats defeat Scrape and hand him over to Mandora to be remanded to the Gray Penal Planet.
- See-Thu – A robotic criminal incarcerated on the Gray Penal Planet. In "Mandora and the Pirates", Captain Cracker and his crew free See-Thu to help him capture Mandora.
- Shadowmaster (voiced by Peter Newman) – A wizard on Thundera who attempted to conquer it, but was defeated by Jaga and Claudus and banished to the Shadow Realm. However, he escapes years, kidnapping Claudus before Thundera's destruction. Through a sequence of nightmares, Lion-O learns of his father's imprisonment in the Shadow Realm and rescues him.
- Ta-She (voiced by Lynne Lipton) – A princess from ancient times who was imprisoned in the time continuum on a boat operated by her humanoid crocodile servants. She wields the power of the Doomgaze which enables her to mesmerize males with her beauty. The Ancient Spirits of Evil order Mumm-Ra to have the Mutants free her using the hair of a cheetah, the tears of a Berbil, the shoe of a unicorn, and a hero to take her place. She puts the male ThunderCats under her spell before being defeated by Cheetara, who as a woman was immune to her spell, and returned to her prison.
- Technopede – A mechanical centipede-like creature and war machine who the ThunderCats prevent from attacking the Tuskas.
- Tookit (voiced by Fred Tatasciore) – Exclusive to the 2011 series, he is a humanoid raccoon and gentleman thief who lives in the City of Dogs and possesses Kleptovoyance, a precognitive ability that allow him to him to see the potential use in pickpocketed items and people to improve his chances of stealing something of value. He obtains the Forever Bag from a fellow thief and forces Gusto, Jenyo, and Albo into his services by placing them in positions where he is the only one who can keep them safe from the Dogs' justice system. He then steals Wilykat and Wilykit's belongings and sets them up as public enemies to prevent them from leaving. However, they convince their fellow blackmailed peers to expose Tookit, stalling him long enough for the Dog Constable to overhear him admit that he forced them into a life of crime. After taking what he believed to be the Forever Bag, he realizes that it was a fake and is sent to The Pit.
- Two Time (voiced by Bob McFadden) – A robot with heads on both ends of his body, with both sides of his body switching positions at different points. His base of operations is a flying fortress called the Dome-Down.
- Warbot – A giant four-legged robot created by the Mutants to destroy the ThunderCats, originally planning to build it on Plun-Darr. When Lion-O travels back in time Thundera before its destruction, he receives its blueprints from Claudus, which he uses to destroy it.
- Wolfrat – A giant wolf/rat-like infiltration robot created by Vultureman and armed with miniaturization gas, which it uses to shrink the ThunderCats before they defeat it with help from Snarf.
- Zaxx (voiced by Bob McFadden) – A four-armed birdman sorcerer who unsuccessfully fought Mumm-Ra for control of Third Earth in the past and was left without a body after his essence was trapped in a magical medallion. Those who wear it acquire his power, but over time transform into him, as he requires a host body. After Vultureman discovers his medallion, the ThunderCats place it on Mumm-Ra as they fall into the cauldron, though Mumm-Ra survives.
- Zig (voiced by Richard Chamberlain) – Exclusive to the 2011 series, Zig is the leader of the Wood Forgers and headmaster of the School of Paper Arts, who specializes in mystic paper arts. After he and his followers saved the ThunderCats from the spirits of the forest, he claims that the Wood Forgers were the protectors of the Forest of Magi Ore and that the giant bird Viragor had been attacking it. However, Lion-O discovers that Viragor was the protector of the Forest of Magi Ore and that the Wood Forgers were the enemies. With help from Viragor, the ThunderCats drive off Zig and his disciples with Viragor taking over as headmaster.
  - Gami - A disciple of Zig.
  - Nips - A disciple of Zig.

== Creatures ==
- Arrietta bird – A species of bird that lives on Third Earth, whose song foretells that the Berbils will have a good harvest. Queen Tartara attempts to steal Arrietta bird so that it can sing to her in her palace, but it is rescued by Lion-O, Panthro, and Snarf.
- Astral Moat Monster – A monster that lives in the moats of the Astral Prison and guards it against trespassers.
- Black Widow Shark – A large shark-like creature with crustacean-like legs that lives in the River of Despair.
- Burglenot – Exclusive to the 2011 series, the Burglenots are four-eyed reptile-like Bulldogs that guard the stores in the City of Dogs.
- Chib-Chib – Exclusive to the 2011 series, the Chib-Chibs are bird/deer-like creatures with long necks, zebra-like stripes, goat/sheep-like ears, and bird-like heads. The male Chib-Chibs have horns. While Lion-O and Tygra search for a way through the mountains, the ThunderCats hunt the Chib-Chibs for food before Wilykit and Wilykat help defend them from a warthog/skunk-like creature, after which they give them a supply of berries.
- Firebat – A bat made of fire.
- Frogdog – Small creatures that roam around Castle Plun-Darr.
- Giant Treetop Spider – Spider-like creatures who are allies of the Warrior Maidens. In "The Fireballs of Plun-Darr", Lion-O and Willa use a Giant Treetop Spider named Bushy to infiltrate Castle Plun-Darr and free Tygra.
- Gomplin – Flying lizard/camel creatures domesticated by the Tuskas centuries ago and serve as transportation.
- Gorot-Rot – A giant two-headed dinosaur with snake-like fangs and tongues that lives in the waters of Third Earth. In "Lion-O's Anointment Second Day: The Trial of Speed", Lion-O encounters a Gorot-Rot during his race against Cheetara.
- Hopper – Giant grasshoppers that serve as transportation for the Trolls.
- Lizarthon –A dinosaur-like creature. In "Trouble with Time", Lion-O saves Willa from a Lizarthon that attacks them.
- Lucy – Exclusive to the 2011 series, Lucy is a giant caterpillar owned by Ponzi who serves as his mode of transportation. When the Cats and Ponzi are gathering leaves from the Caracara Tree, Lucy eats most of them before undergoing metamorphosis. When Mumm-Ra attacks, Lucy emerges from her cocoon as a giant butterfly and crystallizes Sycorax with her wings.
- Miggit Swarm Monster – A monster that resides near the River of Despair and the Living Ooze.
- Mumm-Randall (voiced by Victor Courtright) - Exclusive to ThunderCats Roar, Mumm-Randall is a slow-moving donkey owned by a Wolo who appears in "Snarf's Day Off". At the end of the episode, Mumm-Randall makes himself known to the viewer by stating that he is the neutral force between Mumm-Ra and Mum-Rana.
- Pterodactyl – Flying reptiles that live in different parts of Third Earth. In "Secret of the Ice King", one Pterodactyl was indirectly responsible for the release of the Ice King.
- Ramlak – Exclusive to the 2011 series, the Ramlak is a tentacled sea anemone-type creature that drains the Fishmen's home of its water before the ThunderCats defeat it, after which the water is restored and the survivors return home.
- Sandy-Tailed Hooji – A small furry animal native to New Thundera. In "Crystal Canyon", Panthro gifts Lynx-O a Sandy-Tailed Hooji to keep as a pet.
- Sea-Quines – Gentle seahorse-like creatures that reside in the oceans of Third Earth.
- Shadowbeast – A monster vulnerable to bright light. In "The Shadowmaster", the Shadowmaster sends a Shadowbeast to attack Lion-O.
- Snake Birds – Small flying pink snakes. In "The Evil Harp of Charr-Nin", Wilykit has Charr-Nin retrieve a Snake Bird as part of a distraction.
- Spidera (vocal effects provided by Earl Hyman) – The Queen of the Giant Spiders that rules over a kingdom of webs. She captures Snarf before the ThunderCats defeat her. In "Fond Memories", Mumm-Ra creates a gallery trap for Lion-O with Spidera being one of the portraits of Lion-O's formidable opponents alongside Slithe, Ratar-O, and Safari Joe. In the 2011 series, Spidera is depicted as a giant spider that Panthro and Grune encounter after escaping from a prison camp during the Lizard War.
- Sycorax – Exclusive to the 2011 series, Sycorax is a dinosaur-like monster with bone-plated armor who Mumm-Ra resurrects to act as his vessel.
- Thunderian Mount – Exclusive to the 2011 series, the Thunderian Mounts are cat-like horses that serve as transportation for the Thunderians.
- Tongueosaurus – Large semi-aquatic animals that live in the River of Despair.
- Tricorn Elk – A noble animal with antlers. In "The Telepathy Beam", Alluro mesmerizes a Tricorn Elk as part of a plot for the Lunataks to capture Panthro.
- Unicorn – One-horned horses that reside in the Forest of Unicorns and are watched over by the Unicorn Keepers. As they are considered rare creatures on Third Earth, others often attempt to capture and sell them. ThunderCats Roar features a talking unicorn named Gwen (voiced by Kaitlyn Robrock).
- Viragor (voiced by Héctor Elizondo) – Exclusive to the 2011 series, Viragor is a large bird and the guardian of the Forest of Magi Ore. After Zig desired more wood to make magic papers, he and his followers turn against Viragor and frame him as a threat to the Forest of Magi Ore before Lion-O learns the truth and defeats them. After the battle, Viragor used the wood from the oldest tree in the Forest of Magi Ore to make Cheetara a new staff after her previous one broke during the battle.
- Winged Water Snake – Flying snakes that reside near the Geysers of Life.
- Wraith – Exclusive to the 2011 series, the Wraiths are insect-like creatures that fly in large swarms like locusts. A swarm of Wraits lives near the Elephants' village and targets their harvests. When Lion-O traps them in a cave, it is revealed that the buzzing of their wings keeps a Stone Giant dormant.
