= Lynne Lipton =

American actress

- Other name: Lynn Lipton
- Occupation: Actor
- Years active: 1967–present

Lynne Lipton is an American film, stage, television and voice actress.

She provided the voices of all female characters on the popular 1980s animated series ThunderCats, until the second season, when Gerrianne Raphael joined the cast voicing Pumyra. Among the many roles Lipton performed in the show, she voiced Luna of the Lunatacs; Willa, Queen of the Warrior Maidens; the Female Unicorn Guardian; Wilykit; Mandora; and, most importantly, Cheetara (a role she later reprised for an episode of Family Guy).

She was in the Second City company in Chicago in 1969–70, and The Committee in Los Angeles and San Francisco. After countless off-broadway shows, she made her Broadway debut standing by for Bernadette Peters in the ill-fated musical of the classic La Strada, choreographed by Alvin Ailey and directed by Alan Schneider. It lasted one performance. Her Broadway credits include the original production of David Rabe's Boom Boom Room at Lincoln Center's Vivian Beaumont, performing the matinees for Madeline Kahn, Sherlock Holmes with the Royal Shakespeare Companyfollowed by Tom Stoppard's Travesties also for the RSC. She won several Cleo awards for her voiceover and animation work.

In the mid-1980s, Ad Age dubbed her the Meryl Streep of the microphone. For two seasons in the early-1970s, she appeared on the David Frost Review, with fellow actors Cleavon Little, Marcia Rodd, Jack Gilford. She was originally hired for the role of Mrs. Houseman in the film Dirty Dancing, but became ill and was forced to leave the film. The role went to Kelly Bishop.

She provided the voice of Gethsemanee in the 2002 video game Grand Theft Auto: Vice City.
