= Earl Hammond =

American actor (1921-2002)

- Publicity Photo of Earl Hammond
- Born: Erwin Saul Hamburger; June 17, 1921; Manhattan, New York City, US
- Died: May 19, 2002 (aged 80); Manhattan, New York City, U.S.
- Occupation: Actor
- Years active: 1928–1998
- Children: 2

Erwin Saul Hamburger (June 17, 1921 – May 19, 2002), known professionally as Earl Hammond, was an American actor who appeared in several films and television series. He was best known for voicing Mumm-Ra and Jaga in ThunderCats and Mon*Star in SilverHawks.

== Early life ==
Earl Hammond was born Erwin Saul Hamburger on June 17, 1921 in New York City, NY — his family moved to Buffalo, NY while he was still a toddler.

Earl Hammond began acting in radio at the age of 7, and continued working in that venue throughout his life. In 1938, after graduating from Bennet High School in Buffalo, New York, Hammond began acting in Fred and Ethel Dampier's radio skits on WGR, one of the city's major radio stations. He moved on to California, studied acting at Los Angeles City College, and graduated in 1941 with future stars Donna Reed and Alexis Smith among his classmates. He was drafted into the U.S. Army for World War II.

== Career ==
After he was discharged, he moved to New York City, where he performed in the late 1940s on radio dramas, in summer theater, and in off-Broadway theater productions.

In the 1940s, he had a regular role as a young lawyer on a radio soap opera. He acted on the CBS Radio Mystery Theater, appearing in many episodes, including The Red Badge of Courage (5/1/77), The Man Without a Country (5/8/77), Three Tales of Hans Anderson (5/18/77) and They Called Him Slim (5/21/77).

Hammond started his television career in the early 1950s, his first major role being as a regular called Sergeant Lane on the DuMont police drama Inside Detective (aka Rocky King Detective). At the same time, he also was the first of three actors to portray the title character in the short-lived ABC TV science-fiction adventure series Buck Rogers, which ran from April 15, 1950, to January 30, 1951. In the mid-1950s, he had a major role in the daily/noontime CBS television soap opera Valiant Lady as Hal Soames, the married love interest of the widowed title character.

Hammond was perhaps best remembered for providing the voices of Mumm-Ra, Jaga, and other characters on the 1980s animated TV series ThunderCats, and for being the voice of villain Mon*Star on the 1980s animated TV series Silverhawks. He also was the voice of the Transformers villain Megatron in a series of children's read-along books.

In 1994, Hammond was selected from among several hundred actors who auditioned to be the voice of Pope John Paul II on the audiotape version of the Random House book Crossing the Threshold of Hope. The publisher said the pope personally selected Hammond.

== Personal life and death ==
He married sometime between 1950 and 1980, and had a son and a daughter, both still living at the time of his death by heart failure on May 19, 2002, in New York City.

== Filmography ==
=== Television ===
- Inside Detective (a.k.a. Rocky King, Inside Detective TV series .... Sergeant Lane (1950–1953)
- Buck Rogers (1950) TV series .... Buck Rogers
- The Ad-Libbers (1951) TV game show .... Panelist
- Robert Montgomery Presents (1 episode)
  Our Hearts Were Young and Gay (1954) .... Henri
- Captain Video and His Video Rangers (1 episode)
  Tobor's Return (1954) .... Ranger Colt
- Valiant Lady (1953) TV series .... Hal Soames (1954–1955)
- The Clear Horizon (1960) TV series .... Captain Sovine
- 'Bronco (1 episode)
  Moment of Doubt (1962) .... Mercer
- Maverick (1 episode)
  Marshal Maverick (1962).... Billy Coe
- The Many Loves of Dobie Gillis (1 episode)
  There's a Broken Light for Every Heart on Broadway (1963) .... Nightclub manager
- 77 Sunset Strip (1 episode)
  Walk Among Tigers (1963) .... Conley
- The Gallant Men (1 episode)
  Operation Secret (1963) .... David Storm
- Directions (1 episode)
  Prologue to Christmas (1964) .... George
- The Space Giants (1967) (alternate language version of Japanese production "Space Avenger" (1966)) TV series .... Voices
- Ultraman (1972) (alternate language version of Japanese production "Ultraman: A Special Effects Fantasy Series" (1966)) TV series .... Voices
- Star Blazers' (alternate language version of Japanese production "Space Battleship Yamato") (1979–81) TV series .... Voices (25 episodes)
- Thunderbirds 2086 (1982) TV series .... Voices
- ThunderCats (130 episodes, 1985) .... Voices: Mumm-Ra, Jaga, Snarf Oswald, Ro-Ber-Bill, RoBear Berbils, Snowman of Hook Mountain, Hammerhand, Captain Cracker
- The Life & Adventures of Santa Claus (1985) TV special .... Voice of Santa Claus
- The Adventures of the Galaxy Rangers (4 episodes, 1986) .... Voices: Commander Joseph Walsh, Lazarus Slade, Captain Kidd, Wildfire Cody, King Spartos
- Silverhawks (1986) TV series .... Voice of Mon*star
- The Comic Strip (1987) TV series .... Cawfield ("The Mini-Monsters" segment), Merlin ("The Mini-Monsters" segment), Katgut ("Karate Kat" segment"), Sumo Sai ("Karate Kat" segment), Walro ("TigerSharks" segment), Captain Bizzarly ("TigerSharks" segment), Shad ("TigerSharks" segment)
- Noel (1992) TV movie .... Voices
- The Twelve Days of Christmas (1993) TV movie .... Voices

=== Film ===
- Satan in High Heels (1962) .... Rudy
- Tecnica di un omicidio (a.k.a. Hired Killer) (1966) .... Frank
- Hansu Kurushitan Anderusan no sekai (a.k.a. The World of Hans Christian Andersen) (1971) .... Ducks/Theater Manager
- Sekai Mesaiku Douwa Hakucho no Ouji (a.k.a. The Wild Swans) (1977) .... Voice
- Sekai Mesaiku Douwa Mori wa Ikiteru (a.k.a. Twelve Months) (1980) .... Capt. Rustov
- Thundercats, Ho: The Movie (1985) (voice) .... Jaga, Mumm-Ra, Snarf, Slithe, Vultureman
- Gandahar (a.k.a. Light Years) (1988) (voice) .... Blaminhoe
- The Secret of Anastasia (1997) .... Tsar Nicholas II and Prince Paul/Cheka
- Buster & Chauncey's Silent Night (1998) .... Additional Voices
- Moses: Egypt's Great Prince (1998) .... Voices
