= Mole people (fiction) =

Stock character in science fiction

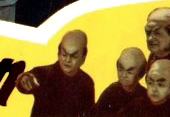
Mole men from the 1951 film Superman and the Mole Men

In fiction, mole people are stock characters who spend their lives underground, often posing a real or potential threat to those who live on the surface.

== Subterranean societies ==
A famous example of "mole people" who live under the ground are the Morlocks, who appear in H.G. Wells's 1895 novel The Time Machine.

Other socially isolated, often oppressed and sometimes forgotten subterranean societies, exist in science fiction. Examples include Demolition Man, Futurama (in the form of "Sewer Mutants") Godzilla vs. Megalon’s Seatopians, C.H.U.D. (which features cannibalistic mutants), The IT Crowd, Us (which featured Doppelgängers), Deus Ex, The Matrix, and Death Line.

In Marvel Comics, the Morlocks are a society of mutant outcasts, named after the subterranean race from The Time Machine, who live in the abandoned tunnels and sewers beneath New York City.

== Humanoid moles ==
Literal races of humanoid moles have appeared in different types of fiction:

- The 1951 film Superman and the Mole Men features small furry humanoids who emerge from underground via a drill shaft. Superman had to defend the mole people from an angry mob.
- The 1956 science fiction film The Mole People features a party of archaeologists who discover the remnants of a mutant five-millennia-old Sumerian civilization living beneath a glacier atop a mountain in Mesopatamia. They use humanoid mole men as their slaves.
- In the 1964-1973 cartoon Underdog, the episode "The Molemen" featured a race of humanoid moles. The Molemen are a society of giant moles who live underground, led by King Mange. They were later featured in the second issue of the Underdog comic book series published by Charlton Comics.
- In the Marvel Comics universe, the Moloids or Mole People are inhabitants of Subterranea, an underground realm beneath the Earth's surface where various species of subterranean humanoids exist. Moloids usually serve as minions of the Mole Man, a human from the surface world who discovered Subterranea and subsequently became ruler of the Moloids.
  - The Underminer, a minor antagonist in Pixar's The Incredibles franchise, is a mole person and a parody of the Mole Man.
- A race of Molemen appear in the Spider-Man episodes "Menace from the Bottom of the World" and "Spider-Man Battles the Molemen", where they are manipulated into battling Spider-Man.
- The Tarzan, Lord of the Jungle episode "Tarzan and the Land Beneath the Earth" had Tarzan ending up in the underground city of Terrapolis, which is inhabited by a race of Mole People.
- In the ThunderCats episodes "The Garden of Delights" and "The Time Capsule," Tygra encounters a race of Molemen living beneath the surface of Third Earth, led by the Molemaster.
- In Johnny Test, there is a race of Mole People who are led by King Zizrar.
- The Mole People appear in Saul of the Mole Men.
- In the Primal episode "Feast of Flesh", Spear encounters a group of Molemen, who are depicted as cannibalistic.
