= Larry Kenney =

American actor

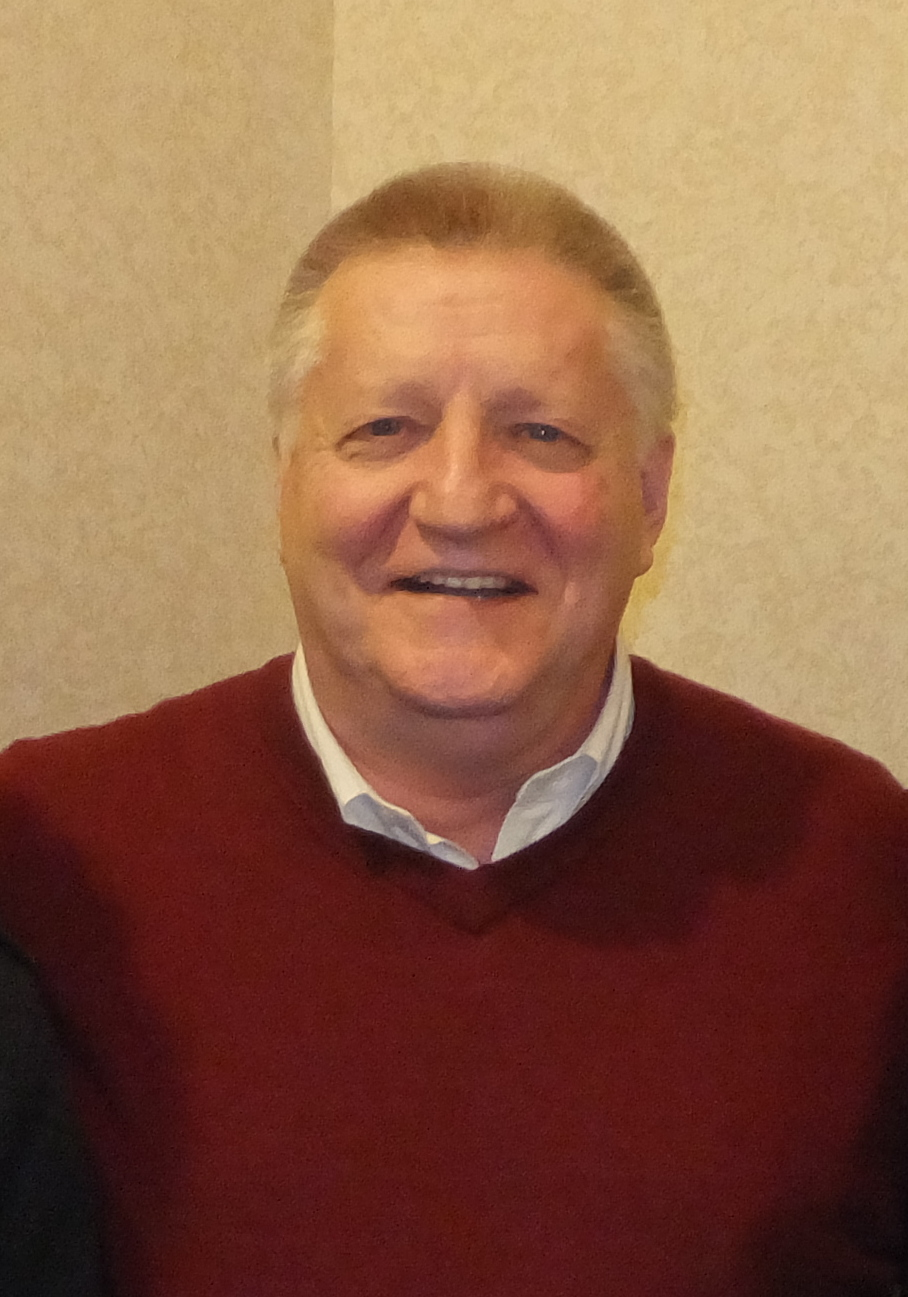
- Kenney in March 2014
- Born: August 5, 1947 (age 79); Pekin, Illinois, U.S.
- Occupations: Voice actor, radio personality
- Years active: 1963–present
- Known for: Imus in the Morning; ThunderCats; SilverHawks; Count Chocula; Sonny the Cuckoo Bird; Bowling for Dollars
- Spouse: Carol Ann Jacobs Kenney
- Children: 3, including Kerri Kenney

Larry Kenney (born August 5, 1947) is an American voice actor and radio personality. He is best known for voicing Lion-O in ThunderCats and being the second voice of Count Chocula after Jim Dukas and the original voice of Sonny the Cuckoo Bird.

== Early life ==
Larry Kenney was born August 5, 1947 in Pekin which is south of Peoria, Illinois, the son of George and Joyce Kenney. He has a brother, Steven, and a sister, Jody. He graduated from Pekin Community High School in Pekin. He attended Western Illinois University in Macomb, northwest of Springfield, Illinois but did not graduate.

== Career ==
In 1963, Kenney began his radio career at the age of 15 as a disc jockey at WIRL in Peoria. After WIRL, he worked at WOWO in Fort Wayne, Indiana; WKYC (AM, now WTAM), Cleveland, Ohio (1970–1973); WHN, New York City; WYNY, New York City; WJJD (now WYLL), Chicago; and WKHK (now WLTW), New York City until 1972.

Kenney was part of the regular cast on the Imus in the Morning radio show from 1973 to 2007, where he recorded impersonations of dozens of characters including President Richard M. Nixon, General George Patton, Andy Rooney, and Ross Perot.

In 1973, Kenney joined 1050 WHN (now WEPN), a country music station in New York City. He originally announced for the afternoon drive-time show, before taking over the prestigious morning drive-time in 1974. His program was a hit, not only for the music, but also for his comical characters who "joined" him while he performed as a dj. Billboard named him Best Country Disc Jockey "at a station in a metropolitan area of one million or more" in 1976 and Best Country Music Personality in 1978. He stayed at WHN until the fall of 1979, when he moved to WYNY to host the morning slot for a year before moving to WKHK's (now WLTW) morning show. He was the host of the New York edition of the television show Bowling for Dollars on WOR-TV (now WWOR-TV) from 1976 to 1979.

Kenney is also known for his voice work as Lion-O on the 1980s Rankin/Bass cartoon ThunderCats, and Karate Kat, a martial arts blackbelt cat featured as part of The Comic Strip. He was the voice of Bluegrass in SilverHawks and Dolph in TigerSharks. He did voice work for several breakfast cereal characters such as Count Chocula and Sonny the Cuckoo Bird. Kenney reprised the role of Lion-O in Family Guy, and voiced the character's father Claudus in ThunderCats (2011) and his mentor Jaga in ThunderCats Roar.

Kenney provided voice-overs for The State, the 1990s sketch comedy cult classic which featured his daughter, Kerri Kenney. He was also the announcer for VH1's Best Week Ever during its run from 2004 to 2009; he provides introductions for Westwood One's radio coverage of Monday Night Football and various other commercial work including for Skittles and Campbell's soup. He was the announcer for The Beat 102.7 in the video game Grand Theft Auto IV and K.T.I. Radio in the L.A. Noire. He did the voice for JB Cripps in Red Dead Online, the online component of Red Dead Redemption 2.

In 2008, he was hired to do an impersonation of Mark Twain for a gala held by the Mark Twain House and Museum in Hartford, Connecticut.

== Personal life ==
He and his wife Carol Ann Jacobs Kenney have three children, daughters Kerri and Ashley, and son Tanner. Kerri, the eldest, is an actress, best known for her work on the series Reno 911! and The State. Ashley works in the nonprofit sector and is the bassist and singer for the band Witch Hair from New Haven, Connecticut. Tanner was the voice of Agenda Caller in the video game Grand Theft Auto IV. Larry and Carol Kenney live in New Canaan, Connecticut.

== Filmography ==
=== Film ===
Year	Title	Role	Notes
1982	A Star for Jeremy		Voice, television film
1985	The Life and Adventures of Santa Claus	Wind Demon Commander	Voice, television film
1986	Light Moments in Sports 1986	Narrator	Voice, television film
1987	Thundercats Ho! the Movie	Lion-O, Jackalman	Voice, direct-to-video
1992	Aisle Six	Announcer	Voice, short film
1993	The Waiters		Voice, short film
1993	The Twelve Days of Christmas	Sir Carolboomer	Voice, television film
2005	Stewie Griffin: The Untold Story	Lion-O	Voice, direct-to-video
2011	Butterfly Blues	Claudus	Voice, television short
2015	The macabre madness of Mortulia Morose	Host	Voice, short film
2015	Vault of Macabre II	Host	Voice, short film
2015	Vault of the Macabre Presents Scary Little Christmas	Host	Voice, short film
2016	Vault of the Macabre Presents All Hallow's Eve	Host	Voice, short film
2016	Vault of the Macabre Presents: the Fright Before Christmas	Host	Voice, short film
2017	Vault of the Macabre: the House Upon the Hill	Host	Voice, short film
2017	Vault of the Macabre: Christmas Cheer	Host	Voice, short film
2018	Vault of the Macabre Presents the Witching Hour	Host	Voice, short film
2018	Vault of the Macabre Presents the Christmas Witch	Host	Voice, short film
2020	Unit Eleven	Narrator	
2020	The Bloody Man	Radio DJ	Voice

=== Television ===
Year	Title	Role	Notes
1985–1989	ThunderCats	Lion-O, Jackalman, Snarf Eggbert, Torr, Safari Joe, Wizz-Ra, Pilot	Voice, main role
1986	SilverHawks	Lt. Colonel Bluegrass, Pokerface, Buzzsaw, Moonstryker, Time Stopper, General Rawlings, Professor Power, Space Bandit, Lord Cash, Warden Lockup	Voice, 65 episodes
1987	TigerSharks	Dolph	Voice
1987	The Comic Strip	Dolph, Karate Kat, Boom-Boom Burmese	Voice, 2 episodes
2011–2012	ThunderCats	Claudus	Voice, 4 episodes
2019–present	Teen Titans Go!	Chief, Original Lion-O	Recurring voice role
2020	ThunderCats Roar	Jaga	Voice, 4 episodes
2024	Pokémon Horizons: The Series	Ludlow	Voice, 8 episodes, English dub

=== Video games ===
Year	Title	Role	Notes
2008	Grand Theft Auto IV	The Beat 102.7 Announcer	
2010	Mafia II	Frank Vinci	
2011	L.A. Noire	K.T.I. Radio Announcer	
2012	Alan Wake's American Nightmare	Eddie Rodman	
2018	Red Dead Redemption 2	JB Cripps	Red Dead Online only
