= Peter Newman (actor) =

American voice actor (born 1942)

- Born: October 2, 1942 (age 83); Charlotte, North Carolina, U.S.
- Occupation: Voice actor
- Years active: 1981–present

Peter Newman (born October 2, 1942) is an American voice actor, known for his work with Rankin/Bass.

== Career ==
In ThunderCats he provided the voices of Tygra, Wilykat, Bengali, and Monkian. In SilverHawks he provided the voices of Quicksilver, Mumbo Jumbo, and Timestopper. He also played the evil Duke of Zill & Wack Lizardi in Felix the Cat: The Movie. In 1987, Newman also provided the voice of the camp director of Camp Mimi-Mon for the Rankin/Bass show Mini Monsters.

== Filmography ==
=== Film ===
| Year | Title | Role/Notes |
|---|---|---|
| 1981 | The Little Fox | The Hunter (English dub) |
| 1988 | Felix the Cat: The Movie | The Duke of Zill; Wack Lizardi; Pim |

=== Television ===
- 1985 - ThunderCats - Ho!: The Movie - Tygra / Wilykat / Bengali
- 1985 - The Life & Adventures of Santa Claus - Peter Knook / Awgwas / The Gnome King
- 1986 - Silverhawks - Mumbo Jumbo / Quicksilver / Timestopper
- 1985–1986 - ThunderCats - Tygra / Wilykat / Monkian
- 1987 - The Comic Strip
- 1987 - TigerSharks - Mako/Wall-Eye
- 1992 - Noël
- 2004 - Fillmore! - Eric Orben / Patrol Sheriff
- 2005 - Extreme Makeover - Narrator
- 2009–2012 - Archer - Maj. Nikolai Jakov

=== Video games ===
- 2012 - The Darkness II - Darkling
