= Gerrianne Raphael =

American actress

- Born: New York City, US
- Occupations: Actress, voice actress
- Years active: 1938-2019
- Spouse(s): John Weaver, Gregory Allen Hirsch, Noah Keen
- Children: Three (first marriage)

Gerrianne Raphael is an American stage, screen, and voice-over actress. She is best known for her major role as the voice of Pumyra in ThunderCats.

== Personal life ==
Raphael was born in New York City to Sidney, a concert pianist and Evelyn Raphael, a former actress. She was married three times, most recently to actor Noah Keen, from 2004 until his death in 2019. Her first husband was stage manager/actor, director John Weaver, (1955 - 1978). Gregory Allen Hirsch (1979 - 1986) was her second husband, a theatrical lighting designer. She has three daughters from her first marriage. She graduated from the Professional Children's School in New York City, in 1949.

== Career ==
Raphael's first professional performances were on radio when she was four years old on Let's Pretend, a children’s program of fairy tales. Her first Broadway show was at seven years of age in a play called Solitaire by John Van Druten. She understudied Patricia Hitchcock, the daughter of Alfred Hitchcock. Since then, her dozens of stage performances have included the landmark production of Threepenny Opera with Lotte Lenya and Beatrice Arthur and the original Broadway production of Man of La Mancha. Having started in radio as a child, the progression to commercial voice-overs, "audiobooks" and cartoons came naturally. At one point Raphael had voice-overs for Revlon, Gloria Vanderbilt, Geritol and Helena Rubinstein all running at the same time. She had also provided the voice for the littlest dwarf on the Ajax commercials in the 1950s.

== Filmography ==
Film
Year	Film	Role	Notes
1938	Little Miss Thoroughbred	Kathleen O'Reilly	Uncredited
1984	My Little Pony: Rescue at Midnight Castle	Sealight (Voice)	
1985	Thundercats - Ho! The Movie	Pumyra (voice)	
2005	The Engagement Ring	Nana Voice Over	TNT Movie
2007	Raising the Bar	Jesse	Short
Radio and Television
Year	Title	Role	Notes
1940	Let's Pretend	One of the Pretenders	Radio: CBS Children's Program
1949	The Aldrich Family	Role Unknown	Episode Unknown
1950	The First Hundred Years	Role Unknown	Role Unknown
1950	Gang Busters		Radio: CBS Gangster Melodrama
1951	Portia Faces Life		Radio: CBS Soap Opera
1951	Armstrong Theater	Role Unknown	NBC-TV: "Sleight of Hand" (September 11, 1951)
1952	Our Gal Sunday	Audrey	Radio: CBS Soap Opera
1952	Medal of Honor	Role Unknown	Radio: Grand Central Station (also appearing Esther Miniotti and Tony Randall)
1953	Captain Video and His Video Rangers	Ranger Craig 3	One Episode: Spartak Returns
1953	A Date with Judy	Guest Appearance	ABC-TV Series starring Mary Linn Beller, with Paul Ford (March 25, 1953)
1960	From These Roots	Louisa Correlli	NBC-TV DayTime Drama 1960-1961
1964	As the World Turns	Helene Suker	CBS-TV DayTime Drama 1964-1965
1986	ThunderCats	Pumyra, Chilla and Jagara (voice)	Episodes: 32 episodes (season 2-season 4)
1987	The Comic Strip	Voice,	Episodes: Two episodes, Karate Kat (voice of Katie "Big Mama" McClaw); Street Frogs.
2000	A Little Curious	Pad	HBO Family. The show, produced by Curious Pictures and HBO,
2001	Courage the Cowardly Dog	Various Roles	Episodes: 26 episodes (season 3-season 4)
2006	Law & Order: Special Victims Unit	Mrs. Weiman	One Episode: Informed
2008	30 Rock	The Nun	One Episode: Reunion
2009	Random! Cartoons	Garlic Boy's Mom (voice)	One Episode: Garlic Boy

== Theatre ==
Broadway
Year	Title	Role	Notes
1942	Solitaire	Virginia Stewart	Standby (Pat Hitchcock)
1942	Guest in the House	Lee Proctor	Standby (Joan Spencer)
1944	Violet	Violet	Standy (Patricia Hitchcock)
1948	Goodbye, My Fancy	Clarisse	
1955	Seventh Heaven	Camille	Understudy Diane (Gloria DeHaven) ORIGINAL CAST RECORDING available Decca Broadway Original Cast Album
1957	Li'l Abner	"Moonbeam" McSwine	Replacement (Carmen Alvarez)
1959	Saratoga	Daisy Porcelain	Understudy Cleo Dulaine (Carol Lawrence) ORIGINAL CAST RECORDING available Masterworks Broadway
1961	Milk and Honey	Zipporah	Replacement (Ellen Madison)
1965	Man of La Mancha	Fermina	Understudy Aldonza/Dulcinea (Joan Diener) ORIGINAL CAST RECORDING available Decca Broadway Original Cast Album and STUDIO CAST RECORDING available Golden Records LP#265
1967	Hallelujah, Baby!	Mrs. Charlies, Mistress, Ethel, Dorothy	Replacement (Marilyn Cooper)
1972	Man of La Mancha	Aldonza/Dulcinea	Lincoln Center Revival
1978	King of Hearts	Isolde, La Chanteuse d'Opera	Understudy Madeleine (Millicent Martin) ORIGINAL CAST RECORDING available Original Cast Records – THT CD 9225
Off-Broadway
Year	Title	Role	Notes
1954	The Threepenny Opera	Dolly, a whore	Theatre de Lys ORIGINAL CAST RECORDING available Decca Broadway Original Cast Album
1954	The Threepenny Opera	Polly Peachum	Replacement (Jo Sullivan) Theatre de Lys
1960	The Threepenny Opera	Jenny	Replacement (Lotte Lenya) Theatre de Lys
1958	The Boyfriend	Maisie	The Downtown Theatre \ The Cherry Lane
1960	Ernest in Love	Cecily Cardew	Grammercy Arts \ The Cherry Lane ORIGINAL CAST RECORDING available Masterworks Broadway
1961	Fourth Avenue North	Principal	Madison Avenue Playhouse with Linda Lavin
1972	Say When	Therese	Plaza 9
1974	The Prime of Miss Jean Brodie	Jean Brodie	Manhattan Theatre Club
1976	Stauf	Goddess Kali	Cubiculo Theatre
1978	Noah	Mrs. Noah	Pratt Institute
1981	The Butler Did It	Angela Butler	Players Theatre
1984	The Ninth Step	Joanna Wheeler	Riverwest Theatre
1989	Sid Caesar & Co.	Part of "& Co."	Downstairs at the Village Gate
1993	Ernest in Love	Lady Bracknell	All Soul's Players, NYC
1996	Dorian Gray	Mrs. Vane	Judith Anderson Theatre
1998	Little Women	Aunt March	York Theater Co. at Saint Peter's Church
2001	Imagining Shadows		Ohio Theater
Tours and Regional
Year	Title	Role	Notes
1940	American Jubilee	Children's Chorus	1940 New York World's Fair, Queens NY
1946	Charley's Aunt		Hunterdon Hills Playhouse, NJ
1950	Cry of the Peacock		Locust Street Theatre, Philadelphia, PA by Jean Anouilh
1953	Glad Tidings	Claire Abbott	Bucks County Playhouse, New Hope, PA
1953	The Country Girl	Nancy Stoddard	Bucks County Playhouse, New Hope, PA with Jack Klugman
1953	Celia		Bucks County Playhouse, New Hope, PA by George Batson, pre-Broadway.
1953	The Little Foxes	Alexandra	Bucks County Playhouse, New Hope, PA
1954	Arabian Nights	Chorus	Jones Beach Marine Theatre ORIGINAL CAST RECORDING available Sepia 11116
1955	Picnic	Madge	Casino Theatre, Newport, RI
1956	Finian's Rainbow	Sharon	Brandywine Music Box, Painter's Mill, PA
1956	Brigadoon	Meg	Brandywine Music Box, Painter's Mill, PA
1957	The Boy Friend	Maisie	Tour through Grist Mill Theatre, Andover MA (July 1957), Neptune Music Circus, Neptune NJ (August, 1957), Southern Tier Playhouse, Binghamton NY (Sept., 1957)
1958	The Boy Friend	Maisie	Highland Park Music Theatre, Highland Park, IL
1958	Brigadoon	Meg	Highland Park Music Theatre, Highland Park, IL
1959	The Boy Friend	Maisie	MusicCarnival Productions, Cleveland, OH
1960	West Side Story	Maria	Paper Mill Playhouse (and subsequent tour), Millburn NJ
1961	Gypsy	Louise	National Company: Lambertville, PA and then the Riviera Hotel, Las Vegas, with Mitzi Green (later Benay Venuta) as "Mama Rose" and Bernadette Peters in the ensemble.
1968	Catch My Soul	Amelia	Ahmanson Theatre, Los Angeles, CA
1963	Fiorello!	Thea	Westchester Dinner Theatre, NY with Michael O'Shea and Virginia Mayo
1970	Dames at Sea	Mona Kent	Parker Playhouse, Ft. Lauderdale, FL.
1971	Man Of La Mancha	Aldonza/Dulcinea	National Theatre (Washington DC), O'Keefe Center (Toronto ONT), Emerson Colonial Theatre (Boston MA) with Allan Jones
1973	A Shot in the Dark	Madame Beaurevers	Lincoln Bank Summer Festival Playhouse-in-the-Park, Cincinnati OH with Elke Sommer
1974	Fashion	Mrs. Tiffany	Theatre-in-the-Dome, Lambertville PA
1980	Man of La Mancha	Aldonza/Dulcinea	Westport Country Playhouse with David Atkinson, Westport CT
1980	Man of La Mancha	Aldonza/Dulcinea	Coachlight Dinner Theatre with David Atkinson, Nanuet NY
1982	Candide	The Old Lady	The Pennsylvania Opera Theater, Philadelphia PA
1994	Bodo	Lady Gutrun	Burt Reynolds Theatre, Tequesta, FL, world premiere of a new musical by Anne Crosswell, Lee Pockriss and Hugh Wheeler
1997	Slouching Toward the Millennium	Jesse	The 42nd Street Workshop, by Murray Schisgal, New York, NY
2000	Dear World	Countess Aurelia	Standby, Goodspeed-at-Chester/Norma Terris Theatre, East Haddam CT
2002	Zorba	Madame Hortense	Berkshire Theatre Festival, Stockbridge, MA
2003	A Delicate Arrangement	Helen Gavros	Winning entry, Theatrefest Regional Playwriting Contest, Montclair, NJ
2005	Cocktails with Coward	Judith Bliss	Don't Tell Mama, New York, NY
2005	The Full Monty	Jeanette	Gateway Playhouse, Bellport, NY
2009	The Unexpected Guest	Mrs. Warwick	Fulton Opera House, Lancaster, PA
