= Thundercat =

ThunderCats is a media franchise, featuring a fictional group of catlike humanoid aliens.

Thundercat or Thundercats may also refer to:

== Thundercats media franchise ==
- ThunderCats (1985 TV series), the original TV series
- ThunderCats (2011 TV series), a reboot
- ThunderCats (1987 video game)
- ThunderCats (2012 video game)
- ThunderCats (comics), a 1980s comic book adaptation

== Other uses ==
- Thunder Cats (TV film) (Hatulot Hara'am), 1998 Israeli TV film
- Thundercat (musician) (Stephen Lee Bruner, born 1984), American musician
- Thundercat (snowmobile), a series of snowmobiles by Arctic Cat
- Tennessee Thundercats, an arena football team now known as the Johnstown Riverhawks
- Yamaha YZF600R, a sports motorcycle also sold as the "Thundercat"
