= ThunderCats Roar =

American animated television series

- Genre: Comedy; Action; Adventure; Science fantasy; Sword and planet
- Based on: ThunderCats by Tobin Wolf
- Developed by: Victor Courtright; Marly Halpern-Graser
- Voices of: Chris Jai Alex; Erica Lindbeck; Max Mittelman; Patrick Seitz
- Theme music composer: Noko (episodes 3–6); Victor Courtright (episodes 7–52); Matthew Janszen (episodes 7–52)
- Opening theme: "Thunder Neko" (written by Noko; performed by Shinsei Kamattechan; episodes 3–6); "ThunderCats ROAR! Theme" (written by Victor Courtright and Matthew Janszen; performed by Andi Gibson and Matthew Janszen; episodes 7–52)
- Composer: Matthew Janszen
- Country of origin: United States
- Original language: English
- No. of seasons: 1
- No. of episodes: 52

Production
- Executive producer: Sam Register
- Producers: Marly Halpern-Graser; Liz Marshall
- Editor: Kyle Stafford
- Running time: 11 minutes
- Production company: Warner Bros. Animation

Original release
- Network: Cartoon Network
- Release: February 22 (Note: The first episode was released online on the CN app on January 10, 2020; it was also previewed on February 17, right after the television premiere of Teen Titans Go! vs. Teen Titans.) – December 5, 2020

Related
- ThunderCats

ThunderCats Roar is an American animated television series developed by Victor Courtright and Marly Halpern-Graser for Cartoon Network. Produced by Warner Bros. Animation, it premiered on February 22, 2020. It is the third television series in the ThunderCats franchise after the original series and the 2011 television series. It is Jules Bass's only solo work without his partner Arthur Rankin Jr., who died in January 2014, and Bass's last television production before his death in October 2022.

The show's premise is similar to the original series; in which the ThunderCats escape their dying homeworld Thundera, crash-land on Third Earth, and face off against various villains led by the evil overlord Mumm-Ra. Like Teen Titans Go!, ThunderCats Roar sports a more light-hearted, comedic tone than previous incarnations.

The series received a mixed reception from critics, while being panned by fans of the original show for its character designs, humor and characterizations. The show ended on December 5, 2020, being cancelled after just one season.

== Premise ==
Lion-O, Tygra, Panthro, Cheetara, WilyKit and WilyKat barely escape the sudden destruction of their homeworld, Thundera, only to crash-land on the mysterious and exotic planet of Third Earth. Lion-O, the newly appointed Lord of the ThunderCats, attempts to lead the team as they make this planet their new home. A bizarre host of creatures and villains stand in their way, including the evil Mumm-Ra, Third Earth's wicked ruler who will let nothing, including the ThunderCats, stop his tyrannical reign over the planet.

== Characters ==
=== ThunderCats ===
- Lion-O (voiced by Max Mittelman) – A lion-like Thunderian and the newly crowned leader of the ThunderCats who still acts like a child. In this adaption, he has a twin sister named Lion-S who is a wanted criminal.
- Tygra (voiced by Patrick Seitz) – A tiger-like Thunderian who is the serious and most mature member of the team.
- Cheetara (voiced by Erica Lindbeck) – A cheetah-like Thunderian who is the fastest member of the team and a professional athlete.
- Panthro (voiced by Chris Jai Alex) – A panther-like Thunderian who is the strongest and smartest member of the team.
- WilyKit (voiced by Erica Lindbeck) – A wildcat-like Thunderian, one half of the ThunderKittens, and WilyKat's fraternal twin sister. She is a tomboy obsessed with fighting and fun in this incarnation.
- WilyKat (voiced by Max Mittelman) – A wildcat-like Thunderian, one half of the ThunderKittens, and WilyKit's fraternal twin brother. He is the more mature twin, armed with chemical capsules in this incarnation.
- Snarf (voiced by Victor Courtright) – The team's mascot and Lion-O's pet. In this show, Snarf is depicted as a robot.
- Jaga (voiced by Larry Kenney) – A jaguar-like Thunderian who is the ThunderCats' deceased mentor. In this incarnation, Jaga is indirectly responsible for both the destruction of Thundera and his own death because he threw the Sword of Plun-Darr into Thundera's core in an attempt to dispose of it.

=== Villains ===
- Mumm-Ra (voiced by Patrick Seitz) – A mummy sorcerer and the main antagonist of the series. He seeks to regain his full power, which he lost after his staff was broken.
- Mutants – A group of creatures from the planet Plun-Darr who allied with Mumm-Ra.
  - Slithe (voiced by Trevor Devall) – The reptilian leader of the Mutants.
  - Jackalman (voiced by Andrew Kishino) – A jackal-like member of the Mutants who is hyperactive and dimwitted.
  - Monkian (voiced by Jim Meskimen) – An ape-like member of the Mutants who enjoys smashing and bashing.
  - Vultureman (voiced by Dana Snyder) – A vulture-like Mutant and technician.
  - Ratar-O (voiced by Crispin Freeman) – A rat-like Mutant who has a history with Jaga.
- Ancient Spirits of Evil (voiced by Chris Jai Alex) – A group of evil spirits who empower Mumm-Ra.
- Driller (voiced by Stephen Tobolowsky) – A drill-themed robotic villain who is powered by diamonds. Unlike the original series, he becomes an ally of the ThunderCats.
- Molly Lava (voiced by Kaitlyn Robrock) – An alien criminal who initially appears in a small, rock-like form. She is among the criminals who are accidentally freed by Lion-O after their prison crashes on Third Earth. Despite Lion-O's efforts, Molly manages to jump into a volcano, becoming a giant lava monster. Molly consumes Lion-O, who beats her from the inside and returns her to her original form.
- Berserkers – A group of cybernetic Viking-like pirates who will do any service for gold.
  - Hammerhead (voiced by Trevor Devall) – The captain of the Berserkers who has a cybernetic arm that can punch and pound with great force.
  - Topspinner (voiced by Erica Lindbeck) – A member of the Berserkers who can spin at high speeds.
  - Ram Bam (voiced by Dana Snyder) – A member of the Berserkers who can roll around at high speeds and smash through objects like a battering ram.
  - Cruncher (voiced by Chris Jai Alex) – A member of the Berserkers who possesses immense strength.
- Safari Joe (voiced by Trevor Devall) – An intergalactic big-game hunter.
- Lion-S (voiced by Laila Berzins) – A lion-like Thunderian and a wanted criminal. She is later revealed to be Lion-O's twin sister.
- Spidera – The queen of the spiders who appeared in the episode "Schnorp".
- The Lunataks – A group of six oni-like creatures who appear in the episode "The Space Beam".
  - Luna (voiced by Kaitlyn Robrock) – The leader of the Lunataks.
- Mongor (voiced by Andrew Morgado) – A goat-like demon that feeds off fear.
- Swampy Johnny (voiced by Robbie Daymond) – An aquatic Elvis Presley-like villain who is pursued by the Terrators, whose homeworld was flooded by him. He comes dangerously close to doing the same with Third Earth. Cheetara developed a crush on him before learning of his true colors.
- Eclipsorr – The CEO of the Eclipsor Corporation, an amoral company that wants to steal the energy of Third Earth's sun and sell it for a profit.
- Grune (voiced by Thundercat) – A Smilodon-like Thunderian who once tried to overthrow Claudus and was trapped in a crystal prison by Jaga.

=== Other characters ===
- Berbils (voiced by Dana Snyder) – A race of robotic bears that the ThunderCats befriend after crash-landing on Third Earth. They are small, but strong in packs. They live for construction and are responsible for building both the Cats' Lair and Castle Plun-Darr in this incarnation of the show.
- Gwen the Unicorn (voiced by Kaitlyn Robrock) – The leader of the magical unicorns of Third Earth. When all of the unicorns are kidnapped, she turns to the ThunderCats for help. Her character is based on the titular character from The Last Unicorn.
- Willa (voiced by Laila Berzins) – The large leader of the Warrior Maidens of Third Earth who speaks through roars or short bursts of sentences.
  - Nayda (voiced by Cindy Robinson) – The second-in-command of the Warrior Maidens and Willa's translator.
- Mandora the Evil-Chaser (voiced by Erica Lindbeck) – An intergalactic police officer of the universe who is annoyed with Lion-O's incompetence.
- Dr. Dometome (voiced by Trevor Devall) – A Third Earth scientist with a robotic "son", Hercules. He takes it upon himself to fix the mess Lion-O creates when he drains Third Earth of the ocean, and floods the city beneath it.
- Mayor Fungustus (voiced by Patrick Seitz) – The mayor of the Moldian world under the ocean.
- Moldians (voiced by Kaitlyn Robrock) – A race of small fungal creatures whose world is flooded when Lion-O pulls the plug in the ocean, reversing the flow of gravity.
- Micrits – A race of tiny humans.
  - Emperor Toadius (voiced by Steve Blum) – The ruler of the Micrits.
  - Prince Starling (voiced by Cedric L. Williams) – The fallen hero of the Micrits who became delusional after searching for the World Tree to drink of its waters and defeat Lion-O.
  - Micrit Elder (voiced by Cindy Robinson) – The unnamed elder of the Micrits.
- Mumm-Rana (voiced by Kaitlyn Robrock) – A mummy sorceress and the good opposite of Mumm-Ra who resides in the White Pyramid.
- Mumm-Randall (voiced by Victor Courtright) – A donkey who is the neutral opposite of Mumm-Ra and Mumm-Rana. He was created for the series.
- The Netherwitch (voiced by Cree Summer) – An inter-dimensional sorceress.
- Barbastella (voiced by Danielle Pinnock) – The queen of the bats.
- Claudus (voiced by Andrew Morgado) – A lion-like Thunderian who is the father of Lion-O and Lion-S.
- Wizz-Ra – An ancient sorcerer who appears on everything that shines.

== Production ==
A third ThunderCats animated series, ThunderCats Roar, was in development and was picked up by Cartoon Network. It was originally scheduled to premiere in 2019, but was delayed to 2020. The show was developed by Victor Courtright and Marly Halpern-Graser. Courtright previously worked on the Disney XD series Pickle and Peanut as a writer/storyboard artist and created the Cartoon Network digital series Get 'Em Tommy!. Halpern-Graser previously worked as a writer for various DC Nation Shorts and was co-creator of the Disney XD series Right Now Kapow.

ThunderCats Roar was cancelled after just one season, less than a year after it premiered. On November 20, 2020, it was confirmed by the show's writer and producer Marly Halpern-Graser in a tweet that the episode "Mandora Saves Christmas" would be the last episode of the series.

== Episodes ==
No.	Title	Directed by	Written by	Original air date	Prod. code	U.S. viewers (millions)
1	"Exodus"	George Kaprielian	Story by : Joan Ford; Teleplay by : Victor Courtright	February 22, 2020 (Note: This episode was first released online on January 10, 2020. Part 1 also aired as a sneak peek on television on February 17, 2020, after the television premiere of Teen Titans Go! vs. Teen Titans.)	101	0.37
2	"Exodus"	George Kaprielian	Story by : Joan Ford; Teleplay by : Victor Courtright	February 22, 2020	102	0.37
Part 1: After the destruction of their home planet Thundera, the titular ThunderCats fly off to a new home, only to crash land on Third Earth after being shot down by their arch-enemies the Mutants. Following a scuffle with the Mutants, Lion-O pursues them into the wild while the rest of the ThunderCats meet the Berbils whose village their ship unknowingly destroyed in the crash. Luckily, the Berbils are quick builders and opt to build their base while warning them of Mumm-Ra. Lion-O ends up encountering Mumm-Ra when chased by the Mutants to the villain's pyramid, with Mumm-Ra destroying the Mutants' ship before returning to his lair. Part 2: Lion-O enters the pyramid to thank Mumm-Ra, only to learn he is evil while revealing the presence of the other ThunderCats on Third Earth. Mumm-Ra, explaining his Doomstaff grants him power while establishing a curse where anyone who says his name is struck by lightning, chains Lion-O up and uses a portal to attack the ThunderCats' new home. Mumm-Ra makes short work of the team despite their resistance, with Lion-O and Snarf arriving too late. Things seemed hopeless until Mumm-Ra unintentionally praised the Berbils as they hug him with his own curse used against him, enabling the ThunderCats to break free with Lion-O destroying Mumm-Ra's staff. Mumm-Ra, reverted to his natural form, escapes and Lion-O promises to stay with his team and lead them to victory.
3	"The Legend of Boggy Ben"	Victor Courtright	Victor Courtright	February 29, 2020 (Note: This episode was first released online on February 17, 2020.)	103	0.42
Lion-O has gotten a hold of the last jar of Thunder Snaps, the best cookies Thundera had to offer! But a difficult to open cookie jar is gonna send Lion-O and Cheetara chasing down a legend, a Boggy Ben-related legend.
4	"Prank Call"	Jeremy Polgar	Story by : Victor Courtright; Teleplay by : Marly Halpern-Graser	February 29, 2020	104	0.36
Lion-O wants to prove to the ThunderKittens that he's not just some boring old adult like Tygra even if it means ignoring his instincts and messing with an obviously evil crystal.
5	"Driller"	George Kaprielian	Story by : Joan Ford; Teleplay by : Bryan Condon	March 7, 2020	105	0.33
Panthro is getting a little fed up with having to fix things around the Cats Lair constantly. This is unfortunate because the ThunderCats are about to be attacked by an unstoppable drilling robot named Driller and he's gonna break everything!
6	"Secret of the Unicorn"	Angelo Hatgistavrou	Story by : Joan Ford; Teleplay by : Ben Crouse	March 7, 2020	106	0.32
A crying unicorn appears at the Cats Lair and weepily tells the ThunderCats that all of her unicorn friends have been captured! Tygra thinks he's just the unicorn expert to help the last of the unicorns, he just needs her to stop sobbing long enough to tell him who took her friends. Easier said than done.
7	"Panthro Plagiarized!"	Jeremy Polgar	Story by : Joan Ford; Teleplay by : Lesley Tsina	March 14, 2020	107	0.42
Panthro is angered when Vultureman steals the plans for his gravity-manipulating invention and tries to conquer Third Earth with it.
8	"Warrior Maiden Invasion"	Angelo Hatgistavrou	Story by : Joan Ford; Teleplay by : Lee Knox Ostertag (credited under former name)	March 14, 2020	108	0.41
A tribe of Warrior Maidens start smashing up Third Earth and imprison the ThunderCats. WilyKit and WilyKat escape through the air vents and try to free their friends.
9	"Lost Sword"	George Kaprielian	Victor Courtright	March 21, 2020	109	0.27
After accidentally catapulting the Sword of Omens out of the Cats Lair and into Mutant territory, Lion-O and Snarf go on a quest to get it back and restore power to the base. However, Mumm-Ra uses the form of a creepy troll to befriend Lion-O and steal the Sword in order to regain his full power.
10	"The Horror of Hook Mountain"	Jeremy Polgar	Story by : Joan Ford; Teleplay by : Eric Knobel	March 21, 2020	110	0.28
After a climbing expedition leaves them stranded on a snowy mountaintop, Tygra and Lion-O are taken in by an overeager abominable snowman and his pet white tiger. However, Tygra is suspicious of the friendly "Snowman" and tries to send an SOS to the other ThunderCats.
11	"ThunderSlobs"	Jessica Borutski & Angelo Hatgistavrou	Story by : Joan Ford; Teleplay by : Ben Joseph	March 28, 2020	111	0.26
After accidentally leaving Tygra behind at Mumm-Ra's pyramid after foiling his mind-control scheme, the other ThunderCats realize they're a bunch of slobs! Meanwhile, Mumm-Ra befriends Tygra after he cleans up the pyramid before using an enchanted karaoke machine to regain his muscular form.
12	"Working Grrrl"	George Kaprielian	Joan Ford	March 28, 2020	112	0.26
After losing a race to Monkian over who gets to be leader of a local village, Cheetara becomes a successful business person. However, the other ThunderCats discover Monkian cheated by drinking a super-speed potion. Now with the help of Cheetara's biggest fan JanJan, they need to dethrone Monkian from his seat of power.
13	"Mandora – The Evil Chaser"	Jeremy Polgar	Story by : Joan Ford; Teleplay by : Cait Raft	April 4, 2020	113	0.38
Lion-O "accidentally" releases a whole space prison full of criminals and winds up on the wrong side of the law when Mandora the Evil Chaser shows up.
14	"Dr. Dometome"	Jessica Borutski	Story by : Joan Ford; Teleplay by : Justin Becker	April 4, 2020	114	0.37
Lion-O is tasked with mapping the beaches of Third Earth, which leads to him somehow draining the oceans of all their water entirely.
15	"Study Time"	George Kaprielian	Story by : Joan Ford; Teleplay by : Bryan Condon	April 11, 2020	115	0.44
Lion-O never pays attention during Tygra's training sessions! So when he's asked to do a pop quiz on "sword magic," he accidentally opens a portal to the Astral Plane and releases the Netherwitch on Third Earth.
16	"Mumm-Ra, the Ever-Living"	Jeremy Polgar	Story by : Joan Ford; Teleplay by : Lesley Tsina	April 11, 2020	116	0.41
Every time Mumm-Ra gets ahold of a magic artifact to restore his powers, the ThunderCats just smash it and turn him into a dinky skeleton again....until today that is because Mumm-Ra just remembered that he's got the Ancient Spirits of Evil on his side.
17	"Berserkers"	Lee Knox Ostertag (uncredited)	Story by : Joan Ford; Teleplay by : Lee Knox Ostertag (credited under former name)	April 18, 2020	117	0.32
The Cats Lair is attacked by gold-loving robot pirates called the Berserkers who have been paid in gold by Mumm-Ra. This is a good thing, really, since it means Lion-O and the ThunderKittens can ditch their chores of cleaning out the silo at the rear of Cats Lair and fight robo-pirates instead. Just don't tell Tygra!
18	"Jaga History"	George Kaprielian	Story by : Joan Ford; Teleplay by : Ben Crouse	April 18, 2020	118	0.38
Freed from the Astral Plane, Jaga – the ghost of the ThunderCats' original mentor – is now free to visit the Cats Lair. That means he can finally tell them the reason why their home planet Thundera got destroyed that involves an attack by the Mutants and their leader Ratar-O who wields the Sword of Plun-Darr.
19	"Barbastella"	Jeremy Polgar	Joan Ford	April 25, 2020	119	0.30
While flying with his new invention, Panthro hits it off with a new friend Barbastella, the Queen of the Bats. However, Panthro has a fear of bats.
20	"Adopt a Jackal"	Keith Pakiz	Story by : Joan Ford; Teleplay by : Bryan Condon	April 25, 2020	120	0.28
After a battle between the ThunderCats and the Mutants, Jackalman gets confused and accidentally returns to the Cats Lair with the ThunderCats. To avoid persecution, he pretends to have lost his memory and think he's their pet. Of course, saving the day over and over again wears him down, and Jackalman longs to be reunited with the other mutants.
21	"Summer Fun Day!"	George Kaprielian	Story by : Joan Ford; Teleplay by : Justin Becker	May 2, 2020	121	0.29
Bored of fighting the Mutants all the time, the ThunderCats go to the beach, only to get attacked by Crabmen who keep bullying them despite the cats vowing not to fight for the whole day.
22	"Safari Joe"	Jeremy Polgar	Joan Ford	May 2, 2020	122	0.32
The game hunter Safari Joe keeps catching the ThunderCats in traps. So, after he humiliates Cheetara, the Cats decide to turn the tables on him.
23	"Ratar-O"	Keith Pakiz	Story by : Joan Ford; Teleplay by : Bryan Condon	May 9, 2020	123	0.26
The ThunderCats have gotten so good at defeating the Mutants of Plun-Darr that it has basically become routine. That all changes with the arrival of the Mutants' old leader Ratar-O.
24	"Prince Starling's Quest"	George Kaprielian	Story by : Marly Halpern-Graser; Teleplay by : Lee Knox Ostertag (credited under former name)	May 9, 2020	124	0.22
Lion-O is playing with Snarf and doesn't have a care in the world. Unfortunately he's accidentally stomping on the miniature village of the Micrits. Prince Starling goes on a quest to become a giant and slay Lion-O.
25	"Lion-S"	Jeremy Polgar	Story by : Joan Ford; Teleplay by : Cait Raft	May 16, 2020	125	0.23
A Thunderian named Lion-S arrives on Third Earth. Lion-O becomes impressed with Lion-S's moves while she becomes impressed with Lion-O's new sword tricks. Lion-O thinks he has found a kindred spirit and a potential new ThunderCat. What Lion-O doesn't know is that Lion-S is an escaped convict from the Gray Penal Planet who is being pursued by Mandora the Evil Chaser.
26	"Snarf's Day Off"	Keith Pakiz	Story by : Joan Ford; Teleplay by : Justin Becker	May 16, 2020	126	0.21
While the ThunderCats look for a Wolo's slowest donkey, Snarf takes a day off to visit an old lady named Mrs. Gristidi in the form of a house cat. As the two of them attend a craft fair, Snarf discovers that Mrs. Gristidi’s stand has a rival in the form of a disguised Mumm-Ra who is trying to sell his hypnotizing ceramic frog statues.
27	"Mumm-Ra of Plun-Darr"	George Kaprielian	Story by : Joan Ford; Teleplay by : Bryan Condon	May 23, 2020	127	0.22
28	"Mumm-Ra of Plun-Darr"	George Kaprielian	Story by : Joan Ford; Teleplay by : Bryan Condon	May 23, 2020	128	0.22
Part 1: Panthro tests the new defense system of Cats Lair with the help of Driller, the Warrior Maidens, and the Netherwitch. He allows Lion-O to use the CatPad associated with it. Meanwhile, Mumm-Ra gets his hands on the Sword of Plun-Darr and regains his gigantic size. He launches an all-out attack on the ThunderCats with the help of the Mutants. Part 2: With Mumm-Ra and the Mutants having taken control of Cats Lair and stolen the ThunderCats' weapons, they begin to enslave all of Third Earth. The ThunderCats work to reclaim their lair as Lion-O is depressed over his latest mess-up and that he is just a tool. With some guidance from Jaga, Lion-O proves to be more than a tool when it comes to taking back Cats Lair.
29	"Mandora's Law"	Jeremy Polgar	Story by : Joan Ford; Teleplay by : Lesley Tsina	November 2, 2020	129	0.21
Tygra creates a bunch of new laws for Third Earth so Mandora can finally arrest the Mutants. Unfortunately, the ThunderCats are really bad at following their own rules.
30	"Thunder Road"	Keith Pakiz	Story by : Joan Ford; Teleplay by : Bryan Condon	November 2, 2020	130	0.21
When a crate containing fifty Swords of Omen lands on Third Earth, the ThunderCats rush to find them. Unfortunately, the Mutants and Mumm-Ra want those swords too.
31	"Corporate Buyout"	Keith Pakiz	Story by : Joan Ford; Teleplay by : Cait Raft	November 3, 2020	131	0.24
32	"Hachiman"	George Kaprielian	Story by : Joan Ford; Teleplay by : Eric Knobel	November 3, 2020	132	0.23
33	"Schnorp"	George Kaprielian	Story by : Joan Ford; Teleplay by : Ben Crouse	November 4, 2020	133	0.19
Nature hating WilyKit and WilyKat pass on a Tygra led hike to explore the attic. They find an old video game cartridge that transforms Snarf into Schnorp, the yodeling nature lover.
34	"Berb-cules"	Jeremy Polgar	Story by : Joan Ford & Marly Halpern-Graser; Teleplay by : Lesley Tsina	November 4, 2020	134	0.18
The ThunderCats convince the Berbils to stop building tech for the Mutants. The Berbils then construct the mecha Berb-cules to reclaim all the tech they've built for everyone, forcing a strange alliance between the ThunderCats and the Mutants.
35	"Pumm-Ra"	George Kaprielian	Marly Halpern-Graser	November 5, 2020	136	0.21
Mumm-Ra disguises himself as a Thunderian to infiltrate the lair. The suspicious ThunderCats try to thwart him with tests, but Mumm-Ra keeps using cat traits to prevail.
36	"King of the Machines"	Jeremy Polgar	Story by : Joan Ford; Teleplay by : Cannie Shin	November 5, 2020	135	0.18
Barbastella reunites with her ex-girlfriend the elitist Queen of the Rats. A jealous Panthro installs AI into all the Lair's appliances, to become King of the Machines.
37	"Sword Heist"	Keith Pakiz	Story by : Joan Ford; Teleplay by : Cait Raft	November 6, 2020	138	0.23
Lion-O discovers that Ratar-O has purchased the Sword of Revenge. So he turns to Lion-S and her crew to steal the sword first.
38	"Claudus"	George Kaprielian	Story by : Joan Ford; Teleplay by : Laura Sreebny	November 6, 2020	137	0.21
King Claudus, father of Lion-O, survives the destruction of Thundera and reaches Third Earth. But the ThunderCats quickly turn on his selfish misrule.
39	"Telethon"	Jeremy Polgar	Story by : Joan Ford; Teleplay by : Steve Clemmons	November 9, 2020	139	0.24
The latest Berbil invention sends the Berbils far out into space. The ThunderCats need all the nickel in Third Earth to build a device to rescue them. So they turn to Cheetara, who can use her psychic powers to run a telethon into everyone's minds to raise nickel donations. But the telethon leaves her mad with control.
40	"Mall-Ra"	George Kaprielian	Joan Ford	November 9, 2020	140	0.24
Mumm-Ra hopes to drive the ThunderCats crazy by trapping them in a mall. But the ThunderCats never seem to tire of loving the mall.
41	"Eclipsorr"	Jeremy Polgar	Story by : Joan Ford & Marly Halpern-Graser; Teleplay by : Laura Sreebny	November 10, 2020	141	0.20
The evil Eclipsorr corporation builds a Dyson sphere encasing the sun, so that they can control the sun's power and sell it for profit. This move prompts Panthro to build a brand new spaceship for the ThunderCats.
42	"Wizz-Ra"	Keith Pakiz	Story by : Marly Halpern-Graser; Teleplay by : Connie Shin	November 10, 2020	142	0.18
The spooky Wizz-Ra keeps appearing in reflective surfaces. The ThunderCats find him so terrifying that they smash every surface that he appears in.
43	"ThunderDogs"	George Kaprielian	Story by : Joan Ford; Teleplay by : Eric Knobel	November 11, 2020	143	0.27
The ThunderCats agree to find an owner for a demon dog from the Astral Plane. The one being that connects with the dog's evil nature might turn out to be the ThunderCats' worst enemy.
44	"Mini Mongor"	Megan Boyd	Story by : Joan Ford; Teleplay by : Lesley Tsina	November 12, 2020	144	0.23
The kittens accidentally release Mongor, a demon that feeds on fear. But in his current state, Mongor is too puny to scare anyone.
45	"Swampy Johnny"	Keith Pakiz	Joan Ford	November 13, 2020	145	0.21
During a heavy thunderstorm, Cheetara meets crooner Swampy Johnny. He's so very cool that the ThunderCats might miss the connection he seems to have to the storm.
46	"Tygra's Garden"	George Kaprielian	Story by : Joan Ford; Teleplay by : Cait Raft	November 16, 2020	146	0.24
47	"The Space Beam"	Megan Boyd	Story by : Joan Ford; Teleplay by : Bryan Condon	November 17, 2020	147	0.16
48	"Plundsmas"	Keith Pakiz	Joan Ford	November 18, 2020	148	0.16
49	"Killing Time"	George Kaprielian	Story by : Joan Ford & Marly Halpern-Graser; Teleplay by : Steve Clemmons	November 19, 2020	149	0.20
50	"Grune"	Megan Boyd	Story by : Marly Halpern-Graser; Teleplay by : Laura Sreebny	November 20, 2020	150	0.18
51	"The First Thundsgiving"	Keith Pakiz	Story by : Joan Ford; Teleplay by : Bryan Condon	November 21, 2020	151	0.27
52	"Mandora Saves Christmas"	Keith Pakiz	Joan Ford	December 5, 2020	152	0.26

== Broadcast and release ==
The first two episodes were released on the Cartoon Network app on January 10, 2020. ThunderCats Roar premiered on Cartoon Network UK on April 6, 2020. ThunderCats Roar later premiered on Cartoon Network Africa on May 25, 2020.

== Reception ==
ThunderCats Roar's announcement was met with backlash from fans of the original series and its 2011 reboot. On Cartoon Network's YouTube channel, promotional videos for the series have received a large number of dislikes, the show only received "1.9/10" rating on IMDb and considered to be one of the worst and most lowest-rated television shows on IMDb of 2020. The series was panned by fans of the previous incarnations of the franchise for its art style, characterizations and comedic tone, drawing unfavorable comparisons to Teen Titans Go!

In a positive review, Reuben Baron of Comic Book Resources says "ThunderCats Roar knows what it wants to be, and a few pacing quibbles aside, it does it well."

== See also ==
- List of television shows notable for negative reception
