= ThunderCats =

American media franchise

- Created by: Tobin Wolf
- Original work: ThunderCats (1985–89)
- Owners: Warner Bros. Entertainment (Skydance)

Print publications
- Comics: ThunderCats

Films and television
- Animated series: ThunderCats (1985–89); ThunderCats (2011–12); ThunderCats Roar (2020)

Games
- Video games: ThunderCats (1987); ThunderCats (2012)

ThunderCats is a media franchise, featuring a fictional group of cat-like humanoid aliens. The characters were created by Tobin Wolf and featured in an animated television series named ThunderCats, running from 1985 to 1989, which was animated by Japanese studio Pacific Animation Corporation, and co-produced by Rankin/Bass Productions.

The ThunderCats franchise simultaneously launched a line of action figures produced by LJN and a syndicated after-school weekday cartoon.

== History ==
The original ThunderCats show was animated in Japan while being produced, written and voice acted in the United States.

The series was distributed by Rankin/Bass Productions' then-parent company Telepictures, which would later merge with Lorimar Television in February 1986. In January 1989, Lorimar-Telepictures was purchased by and folded into Warner Bros. Entertainment, whose television syndication arm would eventually assume distribution of the show; Warner Bros. has owned the rights to the series (and all Lorimar-Telepictures programming) from that point on.

== Notable characters ==
- Lion-O
- Panthro
- Cheetara
- Tygra
- Snarf
- WilyKit and WilyKat
- Mumm-Ra (main villain)
- Jaga

== Later adaptations ==
=== Comics ===
There were also several comic book series produced. A ThunderCats comic book series based on the animated series was published by Marvel Comics through its Star Comics imprint in 1985, lasting for three years and twenty-four issues. During this time, a new series was published by Marvel UK consisting of 129 issues and was also published for three years.

Beginning in 2002, ThunderCats titles were published by Wildstorm Productions, an imprint of DC Comics (Warner Bros. corporate sibling), and included five non-canon miniseries and several one shots.

In March 2012, Panini Comics began publishing a new series in the United Kingdom to tie-in with the television series of 2011, titled ThunderCats Magazine. The first issue featured a strip called Safe Haven which was written by Ferg Handley and drawn by Cosmo White. Each issue also included additional features, such as character profiles, puzzles, a reader art page and a poster.

In February 2024 Dynamite Entertainment announced plans to publish a new ThunderCats series written by Declan Shalvey and drawn by Drew Moss. In April 2024, Dynamite announced a spinoff series focusing on Cheetara.

=== Video game ===
Two video games based on the franchise have been released. The first was ThunderCats: The Lost Eye of Thundera, published in 1987. The second, ThunderCats, was released in 2012 for the Nintendo DS.

=== Board game ===
The ThunderCats have been added to the CMON Zombicide franchise in 2022 in the fantasy universe. Three special boxes allow to play the Thundercats as well as some Mutants as heroes, while Mumm-ra appears as a necromancer and an Abomination.

=== Other merchandise ===
Items of clothing featuring the ThunderCats logo were available in the mid 1980s, and DVD boxsets releases of the original series helped new clothing products enjoy a resurgence in the mid to end of the 2000s, as nostalgia for the former children's favorite grew.

=== Film ===
A film adaptation of the series was announced in June 2007; Aurelio Jaro was to produce a CGI animated feature film of ThunderCats, based on a script written by Paul Sopocy. Jerry O'Flaherty, veteran video game art director, had signed on to direct. The film was being produced by Spring Creek Productions and was set to be distributed by Warner Bros. Pictures. It was set for release in the summer of 2010, but the movie was never greenlit. Concept art for the film was leaked online. In 2011, test footage in CGI was leaked onto YouTube. In 2017, during the promotion of Resident Evil: The Final Chapter, Milla Jovovich expressed interest in portraying Cheetara in a live-action film adaptation.

In March 2021, it was announced that Warner Bros. was actively developing a live-action ThunderCats film with Adam Wingard set to direct, with a screenplay by Wingard and Simon Barrett, and Roy Lee and Dan Lin serving as producers.

At the 2026 Annecy Film Festival, a new animated ThunderCats film was announced to be in development at Warner Bros. Pictures Animation.

=== Television series ===
Series	Season	Episodes	Originally released		
Series	Season	Episodes	First released	Last released	Network
ThunderCats	1	65	September 9, 1985	December 20, 1985	Syndication
ThunderCats	2	25	September 8, 1986	October 10, 1986	Syndication
ThunderCats	3	20	September 7, 1987	October 2, 1987	Syndication
ThunderCats	4	20	September 5, 1988	September 29, 1988	Syndication
ThunderCats	1	26	July 29, 2011	June 16, 2012	Cartoon Network
ThunderCats Roar	1	52	February 22, 2020	December 5, 2020	Cartoon Network

==== ThunderCats (2011 TV series) ====
A second television series of the same name premiered in 2011. It was initially planned to have a fifty-two episode-long first season, but it was shortened down to 26, and cancelled shortly after season one finished airing. It later had reruns on Adult Swim's Toonami block, alongside Sym-Bionic Titan.

==== ThunderCats Roar ====
A third ThunderCats cartoon, ThunderCats Roar, premiered on Cartoon Network in 2020. The show's developers are Victor Courtright and Marly Halpern-Graser. Courtright previously worked on Pickle and Peanut as a writer/storyboard artist and created the Cartoon Network Studios digital series Get 'Em Tommy!. Halpern-Graser previously worked as a writer for various DC Nation Shorts, and was co-creator of the show on Disney XD, Right Now Kapow.

ThunderCats Roar features an explicitly cartoonish art style with a more lighthearted, comedic tone than previous ThunderCats installments. The show's premise is similar to the original; the ThunderCats escape their dying homeworld Thundera, only to crash land on Third Earth, facing off against various villains and their evil overlord, Mumm-Ra.

However, after airing for only one season, the show was cancelled.
