= Lion-O =

Fictional character of the ThunderCats

- ThunderCats character
- First appearance: "Exodus" (ThunderCats); September 9, 1985
- Created by: Tobin Wolf
- Voiced by: Larry Kenney (1985 series); Will Friedle (2011 series); Tara Strong (young Lion-O, 2011 series); Max Mittelman (ThunderCats Roar)

In-universe information
- Species: Thunderian
- Gender: Male
- Title: Lord
- Occupation: Leader of the ThunderCats
- Family: Claudus (father); Leo (ancestor)
- Relatives: Tygra (adoptive brother) in 2011 version

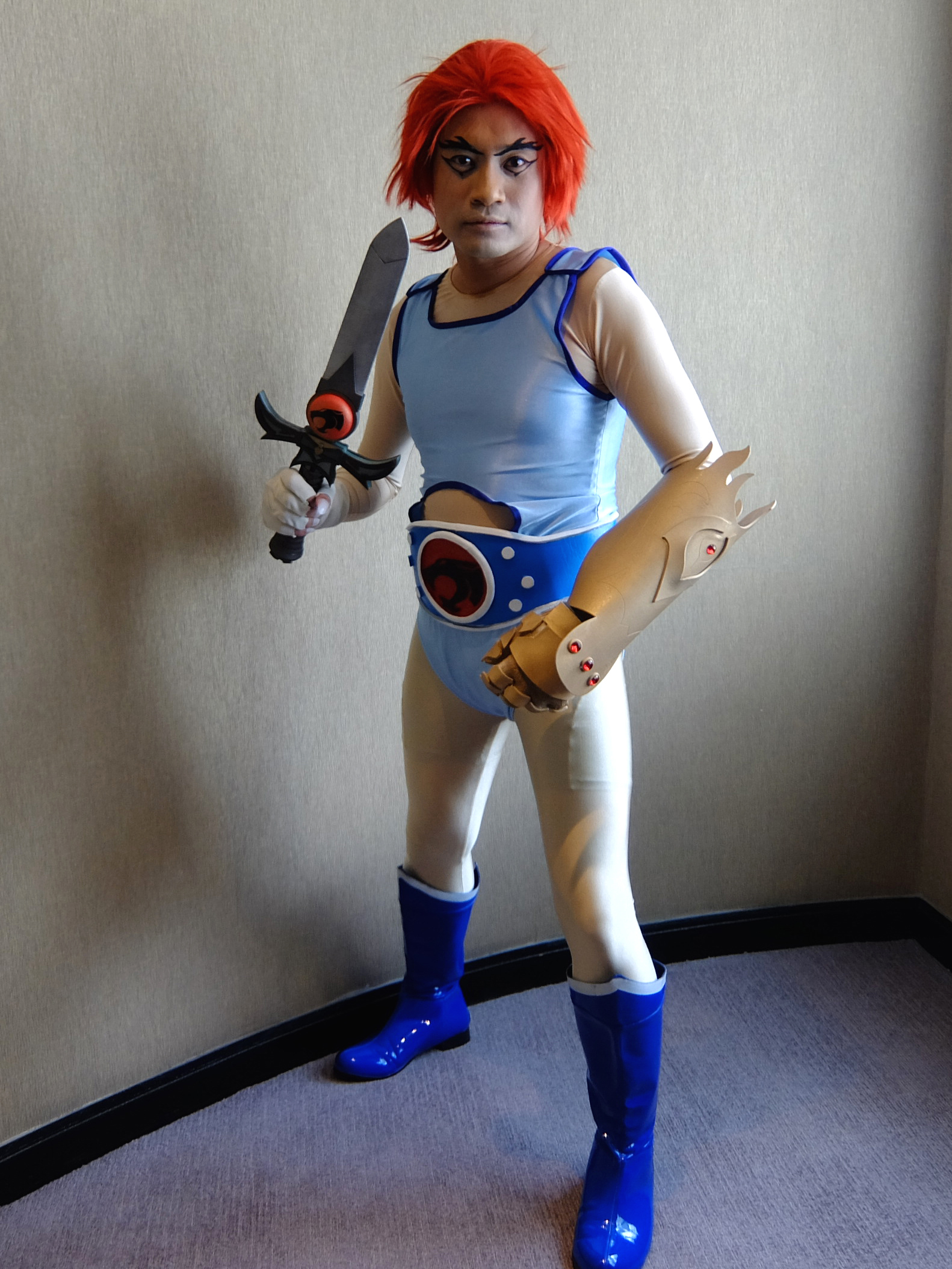
A person cosplaying as Lion-O in 2019

Lion-O is a superhero and the protagonist of the ThunderCats franchise. Lion-O is the leader and the hereditary "Lord of the ThunderCats". Lion-O is based on the lion and wields the legendary Sword of Omens, which is able to fire bolts of energy and allows Lion-O to see across great distances with the embedded Eye of Thundera's power of "Sight Beyond Sight", as well as the Claw Shield, a gauntlet that launches grappling lines from its knuckles.

At the beginning of the series, Lion-O initially had the physical appearance and mind of a twelve-year-old. Due to his apparent suspended animation, he was physically aged to an adult, prompting him to start maturing to live up to his age.

== 1985 series ==
A mere child of thirteen years old at the time of Thundera's destruction, Lion-O aged to adulthood during the trip to Third Earth when his suspension capsule failed to prevent him from aging too much. Although cunning and skillful, he is truly a child in a man's body, and throughout the series, must learn what it takes to become a true leader and gain true maturity.

In the latter half of the show's first season, Lion-O has to put all that he has learned to use in the "Anointment Trials", which consist of contests of strength, speed, cunning, and intelligence (this last is referred to as "mind-power" in the story arc) against each of the other ThunderCats. Complicating matters for Lion-O, he is required to be unarmed for the contests. The other ThunderCats are not permitted to assist him.

The Mutants attempt, but ultimately without success, to take advantage of this last condition in an effort to leave the ThunderCats leaderless. Ultimately triumphing over Mumm-Ra in a final battle ("The Trial of Evil") in the heart of the villain's pyramid, he discovers that Mumm-Ra is dependent upon his sarcophagus, Lion-O is crowned the true Lord of the ThunderCats in a grand inaugural ceremony attended by nearly every inhabitant of Third Earth. It is hinted that he has romantic feelings for Cheetara, Willa, and Mandora.

== 2011 series ==
In the 2011 version, Lion-O is a misunderstood young man instead of being a boy inside an adult body. Lion-O can also be a bit of a hothead but is by far the most patient and understanding Cat next to Cheetara. He is the only one at the beginning who believes that technology and Mumm-Ra exist even though technology is sold across Third Earth.

Lion-O believes that the other races of Third Earth should be treated equal as seen when Lion-O was defending two persecuted Lizards from some Thunderians until Claudus broke up the fight. After Claudus was killed by Mumm-Ra, Lion-O becomes the new Lord of the ThunderCats. His catchphrase is "Whiskers!" whenever he finds himself in a bad situation.

In "Legacy", it is revealed that Lion-O had an ancestor named Leo who played a part in the defeat of Mumm-Ra. Lion-O's weapons are the Sword of Omens and the Claw Shield. It is shown that Lion-O had feelings for Cheetara until in "Between Brothers" when she confessed her feelings for Tygra. In "Native Son", it's shown that Lion-O had an unnamed mother who died giving birth to him.

In "Recipe for Disaster", it's shown that Lion-O had attempted to work through his relationship issues with Cheetara by pursuing Pumyra, trying multiple times to court her, all of which ended in disaster. However, after saving her from Mumm-Ra yet again she gives him a kiss on the cheek in thanks. However, in "What Lies Above Part 2", the feeling was revealed to be an act as she reveals her loyalty and love to Mumm-Ra and only toyed with Lion-O's emotions to further her advantage even though she feels for Lion-O.

== ThunderCats Roar ==
Lion-O takes a more comedic tone and is slow witted and easily frightened.

== Lion-O in different languages ==
Lion-O is renamed León-O in the Spanish version, Leo in the German version, Starlion in the French version, and Lion in the Brazilian version.

== Popular culture ==
Lion-O had appeared in different episodes of Robot Chicken, voiced by Seth MacFarlane.

== Reception ==
Lion-O has received a mostly positive reception from critics. Comic Book Resources ranked the character 8th Best thing about ThunderCats. io9 ranked Lion-O fifth best thing about ThunderCats.
