= ThunderCats (comics) =

Superhero comic book series

- Issue #1 of Thundercats, December 1985.

Publication information
- Publisher: Marvel Comics; DC Comics
- Schedule: Monthly
- Format: Limited series
- Genre: Sword and planet, superhero

ThunderCats is a superhero comic book series based on the original television series of the same name. It was originally published by Marvel Comics through its Star Comics imprint in 1985, lasting for 3 years and 24 issues.

During this time, a new series was published by Marvel UK consisting of 129 issues and was also published for three years.

Beginning in 2002, Thundercats comics were published by Wildstorm Productions, and included 5 mini-series and several one-shots.

== Publication history ==
In December of 1985, Star Comics published the first issue of ThunderCats. Publication was bimonthly for the first 8 issues, and then switched to a monthly publication schedule for the remainder of the series, ending in June of 1988.

During Star Comics' run, Marvel UK published the first issue of their line of ThunderCats comics in March of 1987. Unlike Star Comics, Marvel UK's issues were published weekly until issue #84, when it became a biweekly publication. Issue #95 began the start of monthly publication which lasted until issue #105, when a biweekly publishing schedule was resumed up to #129, the final issue, in January of 1991.

Marvel UK also produced seasonal specials, trade paperbacks, and hardcover annuals.

Beginning in 2002, a wave of mini-series were published by DC Comics through its Wildstorm imprint. DC Comics is a subsidiary of Warner Bros. who acquired the rights for the franchise due to its 1989 purchase of the distributor Lorimar-Telepictures.

The first mini-series, Reclaiming Thundera (written by Ford Gilmore with various artists contributing), published between 2002 and 2003, formed a series of loosely connected "episodes" that saw Lion-O continue his struggle against Mumm-Ra and The Mutants. A major plot point was the slow corruption of WilyKat by Mumm-Ra, which would play a major role in later storylines. After another fateful battle with Grune, Lion-O entered the Book of Omens to begin his training and claim his rightful place as Lord of the ThunderCats, but Mumm-Ra uses a powerful spell to keep Lion-O trapped in the book for several years in real time, not "Book" time, and seizes control of Thundera afterwards.

In the follow-up mini-series, The Return (written by Gilmore and illustrated by Benes, Pimental and Lea), published in 2003, Lion-O returned to Thundera to find it enslaved to Mumm-Ra. Several of the ThunderCats are scattered. Panthro, who was left in charge while Lion-O was away, was forced into slave labor. Tygra and Cheetara are held prisoner in Castle Plundarr while Wilykit and Wilykat are the personal servants of Mumm-Ra. This storyline was distinctly more mature than many episodes of the series, with much harsher language such as "bastard" used by Mumm-Ra. Cheetara is depicted as holding a grudge against Lion-O for "abandoning" his friends and leaving her to be abused by the Mutants and WilyKat's corruption in the earlier mini-series takes greater form. Realizing he has betrayed his friends, the older cub flees when the mini-series concludes. Lion-O and the ThunderCats emerge triumphant over Mumm-Ra once again.

By the third mini-series, The Dogs of War (written by John Layman, illustrated by Brett Booth, Joe Prado, Al Vey and Eric Nguyen), also published in 2003, many years have passed, and Thundera has prospered. Lion-O is now an aged and experienced commander of his countrymen. An invasion of Dogstar forces ultimately lead Lion-O to ally with Mumm-Ra himself (when Ma-Mutt even turns against him). Along the way, WilyKit finds true love and WilyKat redeems himself. The storyline concludes with Mumm-Ra offering Lion-O an elixir of youth so that they may continue their struggle against one another.

The two remaining mini-series were all set during the events of the animated series; Hammerhand's Revenge (written by Fiona Avery, illustrated by Carlos D'Anda), published between 2003 and 2004, and Enemy's Pride (written by Layman and illustrated by Virens, Hellig and Campus), which was published in 2004.

Several one-shots were also published by Wildstorm between 2003 and 2004 that included two crossovers with Battle of the Planets, one crossover with Superman, a Sourcebook and two "Origins" issues that established the back-story of several main characters.

In 2012, Panini Comics (owner of the Marvel UK licence) began publishing a new series in the UK to tie in with the 2011 TV series, titled ThunderCats Magazine. The first issue featured a strip called 'Safe Haven' which was written by Ferg Handley and drawn by Cosmo White.

In 2016, DC Comics made a crossover comic He-Man/Thundercats.

On October 12, 2023, Dynamite announced that they had obtained the license to make a new line of ThunderCats comics, which will debut in February 2024. The new series will be written by Declan Shalvey.

== Collections ==
The series have been collected into trade paperbacks:

- ThunderCats: Reclaiming Thundera (144 pages, Titan Books, August 2003, ISBN 1-84023-732-5, Wildstorm, July 2003, ISBN 1-4012-0036-2)
- ThunderCats: The Return (128 pages, Wildstorm, February 2004, ISBN 1-4012-0273-X)
- ThunderCats: Dogs of War (128 pages, Wildstorm, July 2004, ISBN 1-4012-0287-X)
- ThunderCats: Hammer Hand's Revenge (144 pages, Wildstorm, October 2004, ISBN 1-4012-0297-7)
- ThunderCats: Enemy's Pride (128 pages, Wildstorm, June 2005, ISBN 1-4012-0617-4)

== See also ==
- List of comics based on television programs
