= Bernard Hoffer =

American classical composer (b. 1934)

- Born: October 14, 1934 (age 92); Zurich, Switzerland
- Occupations: Composer, conductor
- Known for: The MacNeil-Lehrer Report; ThunderCats; SilverHawks

Bernard Hoffer (born October 14, 1934) is a Swiss-born American composer laureate and conductor. He is best known for his work on 1980s cartoons such as ThunderCats and SilverHawks. He worked on several of Rankin/Bass's television series and specials. The music he developed for The MacNeil-Lehrer Report, used on the PBS NewsHour until 2015, was nominated for an Emmy Award. He has won six Clio Awards for his work on commercials. He has also conducted several musical shows, such as the ballets A Boston Cinderella! and Ma Goose.

== Early life and education ==
Hoffer was born in Zurich, Switzerland, in 1934. In his early years, he received musical training at the Dalcroze School in New York, then later studied composition at the Eastman School of Music in Rochester, New York, between 1953 and 1958. After high school, he played for two years with New York's Warren Covington Orchestra, the Sammy Kaye Orchestra and the Buddy Morrow Orchestra.

== Career ==
From 1969 to 1976, Hoffer played for Phyllis Newsman, and for Melba Moore in 1971.

In the early 1980s, he was tasked with writing the music for the television series ThunderCats. "When I got the assignment, I looked at the lyrics and wrote, essentially, what was a song to those lyrics," he said. According to supervising producer Lee Dannacher, Hoffer wrote the theme tune in around three weeks.

Hoffer worked as the arranger for the U.S. Army Field Band of Washington, D.C., and later became a freelance musician.

In 2020, he composed the Violin Concerto No. 2, "Decapod".

== Filmography ==
- The MacNeil-Lehrer Report (1975)
- The Ivory Ape (1980)
- The Return of the King (1980)
- Circle of Two (1981)
- The Sins of Dorian Gray (1983)
- The Coneheads (TV special) (1983)
- ThunderCats (1985)
- The Life & Adventures of Santa Claus (1985)
- SilverHawks (1986)
- The Wind in the Willows (1987)
- The Comic Strip (1987)
- The NewsHour with Jim Lehrer (2006)
