= ThunderCats (1985 TV series) =

American animated television series

- ThunderCats logo
- Genre: Action/adventure; Sword and planet Superhero
- Created by: Tobin Wolf
- Developed by: Leonard Starr
- Written by: Leonard Starr; Stephen Perry
- Directed by: Katsuhito Akiyama; Arthur Rankin Jr. Jules Bass
- Voices of: Larry Kenney; Earle Hyman; Earl Hammond; Lynne Lipton; Bob McFadden; Peter Newman; Doug Preis; Gerrianne Raphael
- Music by: Bernard Hoffer
- Opening theme: "ThunderCats"
- Country of origin: United States
- Original language: English
- No. of seasons: 4
- No. of episodes: 130 (list of episodes)

Production
- Executive producers: Arthur Rankin, Jr. Jules Bass
- Producers: Tony Giovanniello; Matthew Malach; Connie Long; Heather Winters
- Animators: Topcraft (season 1); Pacific Animation Corporation (seasons 2–4)
- Running time: 22 minutes
- Production companies: Rankin/Bass Animated Entertainment; Leisure Concepts (project development)

Original release
- Network: Syndication
- Release: January 23, 1985 – September 29, 1989

ThunderCats is an American animated science fantasy television series produced by Rankin/Bass Animated Entertainment and Leisure Concepts. It debuted in 1985, based on the characters created by Tobin Wolf. The series, for which Leonard Starr was the head writer, follows the adventures of a group of catlike humanoid aliens. The animation for the episodes was provided by the Japanese studio Pacific Animation Corporation, with Masaki Iizuka as production manager. The studio was acquired in 1989 to form Walt Disney Animation Japan. Season 1 of the show aired in 1985, consisting of 65 episodes. Seasons 2, 3, and 4 each contained twenty episodes, starting with a five-part story.

The series was originally distributed by Rankin/Bass' then-parent company Telepictures Corporation, which would merged with Lorimar Productions in 1986. In 1989, Lorimar-Telepictures was purchased by and folded into Warner Bros., whose television syndication arm assumed distribution of the show; Warner Bros. had the rights to the series (and all Lorimar-Telepictures programming) from that point on. Leisure Concepts, which helped co-develop the show, acted as a licensing agent for the series.

It also aired on Cartoon Network as part of the Toonami block.

There were also several comic book series produced: Marvel Comics' version, 1985 to 1988; and five series by Wildstorm, an imprint of DC Comics, beginning in 2003.

A film adaptation of the series was announced in June 2007; Aurelio Jaro was making an animated feature film of ThunderCats, based on a script written by Paul Sopocy. Jerry O'Flaherty, veteran video game art director, had signed on to direct. The film was planned to be produced by Spring Creek Productions. It was originally set for a summer 2010 release, but the movie has since been put on hold. Concept art for the film has also been leaked online.

The music for the series, including the theme tune, was written by Swiss-born Bernard Hoffer. Craig Snyder played the electric guitar.

== Production ==
The first season cost $15 million to make. Stanley Weston oversaw the creation of the series.

== Plot ==
ThunderCats follows the adventures of the eponymous team of heroes, cat-like humanoid aliens on a planet called Third Earth. The series plot begins with the dying planet Thundera meeting its end, forcing the ThunderCats (a sort of Thunderian nobility) to flee their homeworld. The fleet is attacked by the Thunderians' enemies, the Mutants of Plun-Darr, who destroy most of the starships in the "ThunderFleet", but spare the flagship hoping to capture the legendary mystic Sword of Omens they believe is on board.

The sword holds the Eye of Thundera, the source of the ThunderCats' power, which is embedded in the hilt. Though the Mutants damage the flagship, the power of the Eye drives them back. The damage to the ship means the journey to their original destination is not possible, instead having to journey to "Third Earth", which will take much longer than they had anticipated.

The eldest of the ThunderCats, Jaga, volunteers to pilot the ship while the others sleep in capsules. He dies of old age in the process, but not before ensuring they will reach their destination safely. The flagship contains the young Lord of the ThunderCats, Lion-O, as well as the ThunderCats Cheetara, Panthro, Tygra, WilyKit and WilyKat, and Snarf.

When the ThunderCats awaken from their suspended animation on Third Earth after ten "galacto-years", Lion-O discovers that his suspension capsule has slowed, rather than stopped, his aging. He has now become essentially a child in the body of an adult. Together, the ThunderCats and the friendly natives of Third Earth construct the "Cat's Lair", their new home and headquarters, but before long, the Mutants have tracked them down to Third Earth. The intrusion of these two alien races upon the world does not go unnoticed, as a demonic, mummified sorcerer calling himself Mumm-Ra recruits the Mutants to aid him in his campaign to acquire the Eye of Thundera and destroy the ThunderCats, so that his evil may continue to hold sway over Third Earth.

== Episodes ==
Season	Episodes	Originally released	
Season	Episodes	First released	Last released
1	65	January 23, 1985	December 20, 1985
"ThunderCats - Ho!"	5	October 1, 1986	October 1, 1986
2	20	September 17, 1987	October 9, 1987
3	20	September 5, 1988	September 30, 1988
4	20	September 4, 1989	September 29, 1989

== Setting ==
=== Season 1 ===
The basic plot above sets the stage the first season of the show, and serves as the basis for stories mixing elements of science fiction and fantasy into a traditional good-versus-evil tale, introducing recurring allies and villains into the world of the ThunderCats. Futuristic technology is just as central to the series as magic and myth, but even in the midst of all this action, the series never underemphasizes the importance of moral values in solving problems. Each episode normally includes a short dénouement, featuring the characters recuperating after the events of the story and taking the time to single out a personal value or wholesome approach that helped save the day, or could have done so if they had seen it.

The first half of Season 1 featured a gentle continuity, with early episodes following on from one another and establishing recurring concepts, although this became less common as the season transitioned into its second half, which comprised mostly incidental one-shot adventures. Tying the second half of season one together was the overarching five-part adventure written by series head writer Leonard Starr, "Lion-O's Annointment", in which an unarmed Lion-O faced off against first each of the other ThunderCats, and then Mumm-Ra, so he could truly earn his title as Lord of the ThunderCats. The five parts were:

1. "Day One: The Trial Of Strength" – Lion-O had to out-do Panthro in a strength contest.
2. "Day Two: The Trial Of Speed" – Lion-O had to beat Cheetara in a race.
3. "Day Three: The Trial Of Cunning" – Lion-O had to outwit both of the "ThunderKittens", WilyKat and WilyKit, in an underground location.
4. "Day Four: The Trial Of Mind-Power" – Lion-O was pitted against Tygra in a mind-based challenge.
5. "Last Day: The Trial Of Evil" – Lion-O had to defeat Mumm-Ra. In his "Trial Of Evil", Lion-O discovered that Mumm-Ra was highly dependent on the sarcophagus inside which he had been mummified.

On all four days except the last, the Mutants tried to interfere with Lion-O's trials so that they could force the ThunderCats to remain leaderless. The other ThunderCats were each then forced to involve themselves in the conflict specifically to foil the Mutants' interferences—all while trying to avoid assisting Lion-O in his anointment trials.

Although intended to be viewed consecutively (as the adventures depicted occurred one day after the other), the five parts of the mini-series were erroneously aired (and released on DVD) with multiple other episodes between each installment.

=== ThunderCats—Ho! and Season 2 ===
A second five-part miniseries was produced for 1986, introducing three new ThunderCat characters into the story. The story appeared to conclude with Mumm-Ra's destruction, but when the series returned for a full second season a year later in 1987, it was revealed that he had survived. The second season set up the formula that seasons 3 and 4 would also follow, beginning with a five-part miniseries to set up the new characters and concepts that would go on to be explored over the rest of the season. Season 2 began with "Mumm-Ra Lives!", written by Leonard Starr, which debuted a new third faction, the villainous Lunataks, and equipped the new team of ThunderCats from ThunderCats – Ho! with their own headquarters and vehicles.

=== Season 3 ===
The 1988 season began with the Peter Lawrence-scripted "ThunderCubs" which, though named for its plot about the ThunderCats being transformed into children, was principally about Mumm-Ra reconstructing Thundera in order to retrieve both the weapon that had originally destroyed it (the Sword of Plun-Darr) and the legendary Treasure of Thundera. In the course of the adventure, the treasure—containing the Book of Omens, a tome holding all the secrets of the ThunderCats, and many other mystical items—was scattered across the New Thundera, ushering in a new concept for the series: a season with an actual story arc. Continuity between episodes became tighter as the ThunderCats, Mutants, Lunataks and Mumm-Ra alternated their adventures between Third Earth and New Thundera, searching for the treasure and exploiting its powers.

The season featured the running theme of the Ancient Spirits of Evil having to take a more active hand in pushing Mumm-Ra into action, culminating in another unique feature of the season—an actual finale episode, "The Last Day", in which the Ancient Spirits of Evil give Mumm-Ra one last chance to destroy the ThunderCats by sunset. Besides demonstrating their threat by making Ma-Mutt disappear, the Ancient Spirits of Evil stated that Mumm-Ra's failure will also have the Mutants and the Lunataks removed from Third Earth. Ultimately, Mumm-Ra failed and the Ancient Spirits of Evil exiled him to the farthest corner of the Universe.

=== Season 4 ===
In the opening miniseries, Peter Lawrence's "Return to Thundera!", the ThunderCats returned to New Thundera to rebuild their society, but before departing, they destroyed Mumm-Ra's pyramid. This enraged the Ancient Spirits of Evil to the point that they brought Mumm-Ra back and installed him within a new pyramid on New Thundera.

The season proved to be quite divorced from what had gone before, with adventures consigned almost entirely to New Thundera, and most villainous opposition coming from either Mumm-Ra or assorted new villains. The Mutants, Lunataks, and Captain Cracker all returned for one episode each. In the series finale, several conclusions are reached:

- Mumm-Ra stands up to and successfully asserts himself over the Ancient Spirits of Evil.
- The mystery of the Book of Omens is at last solved.
- The tumultuous and terrifying environment of Thundera is at last rendered peaceful and pristine.

== Cast ==
Despite its large cast of characters, ThunderCats featured a rather small circle of voice actors, with only six actors providing voices for the entire first season. Every actor provided multiple voices, although the distinctive baritone of Earle Hyman (Panthro) left the actor providing only very occasional guest voices in comparison with his fellow performers. As the first season's only female actor, Lynne Lipton (Cheetara and WilyKit) provided voices for every single female character that appeared in the season. Earl Hammond (Mumm-Ra and Jaga) and Bob McFadden (Snarf and Slythe) most regularly provided the voices of guest characters.

1986's "Thundercats—Ho!" added Gerrianne Raphael to the cast as the voice of Pumyra, while 1987's "Mumm-Ra Lives!" saw the addition of Doug Preis as the voice of Alluro.

Voice actor	Regular Heroes	Regular Villains	Recurring characters
Larry Kenney	Lion-O	Jackalman; Tug-Mug	Ratar-O; Snarf Eggbert
Earle Hyman	Panthro	Red-Eye; Ancient Spirits of Evil	N/A
Earl Hammond	Jaga	Mumm-Ra; Vultureman; Amok	Snarf Oswald; Ro-Ber-Bill; RoBear Berbils; Snowman of Hook Mountain; Hammerhand; Captain Cracker
Peter Newman	Tygra; WilyKat; Bengali	Monkian	Hachiman
Lynne Lipton	Cheetara; WilyKit	Luna	Willa; Nayda; Mandora the Evil Chaser
Bob McFadden	Snarf; Lynx-O; Snarfer	Slythe	Grune the Destroyer; Driller; Molemaster; Quickpick; Captain Shiner
Gerrianne Raphael	Pumyra	Chilla	Jagara
Doug Preis	n/a	Alluro	N/A

== DVD releases ==
=== Volumes ===
Warner Home Video/Warner Bros. Family Entertainment released the entire original 1980s series of ThunderCats in the US over a number of volumes in the following order:

DVD name	Ep. No.	Region 1 release date	Region 2 release date	Additional information
Season 1, Volume 1	33	August 9, 2005	January 15, 2007	"Feel the Magic, Hear the Roar: ThunderCats Fans Speak Out": an interview featurette in which Wil Wheaton (of Star Trek: The Next Generation) and other loyal fans give their memories and support to this animation classic
Season 1, Volume 2	32	December 6, 2005	August 13, 2007	ThunderCats Ho! The Making of a Pop Culture Phenomenon: Executive Producer Arthur Rankin Jr. shares secrets from the show
Season 2, Volume 1	34	April 18, 2006	April 14, 2008	Featurette on the series' composer, Bernard Hoffer; Music video of the show's theme song performed by The Rembrandts
Season 2, Volume 2	31	November 28, 2006	June 2, 2008	Features ThunderCats Ultimate Adventure Challenge on Disc 12
Season 1, Part 1	13	July 12, 2011		
Season 2, Part 2	13	March 24, 2012		
The Complete Series	130	June 4, 2019		"Feel the Magic, Hear the Roar: ThunderCats Fans Speak Out", ThunderCats Ho! The Making of a Pop Culture Phenomenon, The Rembrandts Music Video, The Music of Thundera, Bernie Hoffer – Live!

=== Complete series ===
Warner Home Video have released the entire ThunderCats series in the UK in the following order:

DVD name	Ep. No.	Region 1 release date	Region 2 release date	Additional information
Season 1	65	TBA	18 February 2008	N/A
Season 2	65	TBA	18 August 2008	N/A
Season 1 & 2	130	TBA	3 November 2008	N/A

== Reception ==
In January 2009, IGN named ThunderCats as the 49th-best show in the Top 100 Best Animated TV Shows.

== Spinoffs ==
=== Film ===
In November 1987, a VHS called 'Thundercats Ho!' was released in the UK by Video Collection International. The film was submitted to the BBFC, who recorded it being 90 m 31s excluding 5 seconds cut for a Universal rating. It was actually the first five episodes of season 2 edited to look like a feature-length film. Season 2 never aired in the UK. This VHS may have been shown on American TV by stations without access to the individual episodes.

In 2008–2009, Warner Bros. was in the process of creating an animated film based on ThunderCats. It was rumored to be an original story expanding on the events of the first episode and the film's concept artwork (released in July 2009) contained the main character Lion-O and three locations. A two-minute test scene was filmed and presented to Warner Bros.; however, the movie has been put on indefinite hold, perhaps due to the critical and commercial failure of the 2008 movie Speed Racer (another Warner Bros. CGI project).

In March 2021, it was announced that Warner Bros. Pictures was once more actively developing a live-action ThunderCats film with Adam Wingard attached to direct the film, with a screenplay by Wingard and Simon Barrett, and Roy Lee and Dan Lin serving as producers.

On June 22, 2026, during the Annecy International Animated Film Festival, Warner Bros. Animation announced the project for an animated film.

=== 2011 series ===
A new ThunderCats animated series produced by Warner Bros. Animation began airing on Cartoon Network from July 2011. Animation production was provided by Japanese animation studio Studio 4°C. Sam Register was the executive producer and was joined by Michael Jelenic and Ethan Spaulding as the producers for the series. The show explained Lion-O's ascension to the Thunderian throne with a more original feel and darker style than the 1980s series.

The new series made it clear in the very beginning, that they are not adhering to the original story line. In the original series the Thunder Cats leave Thundera, as the last of their race, to eventually arrive on the 3rd earth. In the new series the very first line states that the Thunderians are already on the 3rd earth. As the first few episodes progress the new writers seem to use Thundera but it is not clear if they are referring to a planet or kingdom. Former Lion-O voice actor Larry Kenney returned to play the role Lion-O's father Claudus in the opening two-part episode of the new series.

In January 2011, a promotional poster featuring re-imagined designs for Lion-O, Cheetara, Panthro, Tygra, and design for the Sword of Omens and vehicles were shown at the London Toy Fair. The series began airing on Cartoon Network on July 29, 2011 with an hour-long premiere. The UK premiere on Cartoon Network began on 10 September 2011.

Despite an early positive response, with the animation in particular receiving heavy praise from critics, the series failed to make any real impact and viewing figures slowly declined after the first episode, with blame falling on a relatively dark and complicated storyline considering the show was aimed at 6-12 year olds. Merchandise struggled to sell, and as a result the show was cancelled after only one season.

== In other media ==
=== Comic books ===
There were also several comic book series produced. A ThunderCats comic book series based on the animated series was originally published by Marvel Comics through its Star Comics imprint in 1985, lasting for 3 years and 24 issues. During this time, a new series was published by Marvel UK consisting of 129 issues and was also published for three years. Beginning in 2002 ThunderCats titles were published by Wildstorm Productions, an imprint of DC Comics (Warner Bros.' corporate sibling), and included 5 non-canon mini-series and several one-shots.

Dynamite would partner with WB create a new ThunderCats comic with a spinoff Cheetara comic released in July 2024.

=== Video games ===
Two video games based on the franchise exist: ThunderCats: The Lost Eye of Thundera, a 1987 side-scrolling video game; and ThunderCats, a 2012 Nintendo DS game based on the show's revival. Many years later, Cartoon Network's official website featured a game that allowed visitors to play as Lion-O and rescue fellow ThunderCats while venturing into Mumm-Ra's tomb (this game, titled ThunderCats: Tomb of Mumm-Raa, can be found on an archived Toonami database).

== Merchandise ==
LJN produced the ThunderCats action figures from 1984 to 1987. The ThunderCats line was based on the animated series which was actually created in 1983. Due to difficulties, it would not air until 1985. Each figure had an action feature of some sort, and the line also included a unique "laser" light-up feature that interacted between the Cats' Lair playset, some figures, and some accessories. Lion-O's eyes and Mumm-Ra's eyes would illuminate when a special battery-powered key ring that came with the figure was pressed into a slot in their backs. PVC companions were packaged with some figures in 1986, including WilyKat with Tygra, WilyKit with Cheetara, Snarf with Lion-O, and Ma-Mutt with Mumm-Ra. The PVC companion figures were also produced as full size articulated figures.

LJN did produce a few variant figures including the young Tygra version and the silver rat-eye daggers for Rataro. There are also a few slight color variations of Lion-O, such as red and orange-haired versions. The third series of figures from 1987 are harder to find along with the Tongue-A-Saurus and Astral Moat Monster. Driller and Stinger are the toughest figures to track down; Stinger's wings are very fragile, making it next to impossible to find a loose, complete figure.

An unproduced final series of figures would have included The Mad Bubbler, Red-Eye of the Lunataks, Ratilla, Cannon-Blaster and Quick-Jaws from the Bezerkers as well as the Feliner, Thunderstrike and Luna Tacker. Photos of these were featured in the 1987 LJN catalog.

Other ThunderCats merchandise of the 1980s included, among other items, a board game, TV tray table, an electronic racing set, tin lunch box, clothing and apparel. A retro spurt occurred in the mid-1990s and 2000s (decade) that began with the familiar 1980s ThunderCats emblem on T-shirts and has since grown to include new T-shirt designs and various other ThunderCats-themed apparel such as hats and belt buckles, plus a tan backpack with the ThunderCats on it.

In May 2009, Warner Brothers gave Hard Hero the rights to produce a line of collectible statues based on the ThunderCats characters.

In 2011, Bandai released a new toylines, based on both the classic and the 2011 series.

In February 2011, Mezco Toyz acquired the ThunderCats license to produce large scale rotocast figures based on the 1980s animated series. Lion-O was the first announced figure in their toyline.

Jerry Macaluso, owner of Pop Culture Shock, collectible statue company, announced in March 2010 that he had acquired his "dream license". The company went on to produce premium format ThunderCats statues (1:4 scale, over 30 inches) of Lion-O and Mumm-Ra. Prototypes of Cheetara and Tygra were developed and displayed online and at San Diego Comic-Con, respectively, but did not reach minimum pre-order thresholds. The prototypes were donated to the ThunderCats Museum in 2014.

== See also ==
- SilverHawks
- TigerSharks
