= Thundercat (snowmobile) =

Type of snowmobile produced by Arctic Cat (1993–2002)

Thundercat is the name of a series of snowmobiles produced by Arctic Cat from 1993 to 2002, and subsequently from 2017 to present. When used, Thundercat denotes the most powerful model of snowmobile in Arctic Cats Line-up.

== Thundercat 900 (1993-1997) ==
The Thundercat series was introduced in 1993, as Arctic Cats entry into the Musclesled category. These sleds feature extremely powerful engines placed in chassis derived from racing models. The first-gen featured a Suzuki-produced, counterbalanced case-reed triple cylinder 2-stoke 900cc engine, which produced 161.5 horsepower. The engines came stock with triple tuned pipes, 38mm VM Roundslide Mikuni Carburetors and forged pistons. This shared similarities with smaller displacement contemporaries, the Arctic Cat ZRT 800, Polaris XCR 800, and the Skidoo Mach Z 800. The sled also featured a Wilwood hydraulic Disc brake. Attaining a confirmed top speed of 113mph while ridden by Jim Dimmerman, the 1993 sled set a then-current world speed record. These initial models were built on the AWS3 chassis, which had been introduced by Arctic Cat for select 1992 models. In 1996, the 900 was upgraded to the AWS4 chassis.

== Thundercat 1000 (1998-2002) ==
In 1998, in an effort to maintain dominance in the Musclesled category, the Thundercat displacement was increased to the 999cc. They continued to use a Suzuki-produced, counterbalanced case-reed triple cylinder engine, but now had an output of 172hp. The machine was also notable for using many weight-cutting measures, such as plastic skis, aluminum spindles, and aluminum-stamped rails. These measures made the sled lighter than many other manufacturers 800cc-class snowmobiles of the same year. In 1999, the model was revamped with the AWS5 chassis. In 2000, the carburetors were changed to TM Flatslides & 3-D ignition , TPS controlled timing curve. In 2002, reverse and Electric start were added.

As of 2016, when the NSSR last posted updated speed records, the 1998 Thundercat had held the stock 1000cc speed record for 18 years, with Paddy Olsen riding one to 120.893MPH

== ZR 9000 Thundercat (2017-present) ==
Announced in 2016, Arctic Cat reintroduced the Thundercat nameplate on their most powerful snowmobile of the 2017 line-up, after a 15 year gap. This iteration features a Yamaha-produced 998cc 4-stroke, DOHC engine with Turbo-charger, capable of excess of 200hp. The machine features the auto-tensioning Team Rapid Response II Drive clutch, a digital dash and Fox Zero QS3 shock absorbers. In a 2017 Review, Denis Lavoie praised the smooth power delivery, lighting and trail-manners of the Thundercat, while criticizing the reverse gear operation and handlebar mounted display-dial placement.

== Other use of the Thundercat Moniker ==
Arctic Cat utilized the Thundercat name within their ATV line, to denote the largest displacement models from 2007 until 2010.
