= ThunderCats (2012 video game) =

- North American box art
- Developer: Aspect Co.
- Publisher: Namco Bandai Games
- Platform: Nintendo DS
- Release: NA: October 30, 2012; EU: November 2, 2012
- Genre: Platform
- Mode: Single-player

ThunderCats is a platform game for the Nintendo DS developed by Aspect and published by Namco Bandai Games. It is based on the 2011 animated series of the same name, and was released in North America in October 2012 and Europe in November 2012. It is the first game in the franchise to be released since ThunderCats: The Lost Eye of Thundera appeared on various home computers in 1987.

== Gameplay ==
ThunderCats is a 2D platform game where players control Lion-O, leader of the ThunderCats, who uses his Sword of Omens to defeat enemies. Players traverse the game's levels dispatching enemies and battling bosses, and are able to call upon other members of Lion-O's team to briefly assist him once unlocked: Panthro, Cheetara, Tygra, and WilyKit with WilyKat. Lion-O's abilities include a slide, double-jump, and downward stab attack, as well as the ability to fire a beam of light from the Eye of Thundera in his sword's hilt once his power gauge has been filled. Still images from the 2011 ThunderCats animated series accompany story interludes between levels.

== Development ==
The game was developed by Aspect Digital Entertainment and published by Namco Bandai Games, making an appearance at the company's booth during the 2012 Electronic Entertainment Expo in Los Angeles. An original release period of August 2012 was announced in April of that year. In a July Bandai Namco Entertainment press statement, ThunderCats was later set for release on September 28, 2012, but was delayed again until the following October in North America and November in Europe. It ultimately debuted four months after the final episode of the animated series aired in June 2012, following Cartoon Network's decision to not renew the show for a second season.

== Reception ==
Reception

Aggregate score
Aggregator	Score
Metacritic	28 / 100

Review scores
Publication	Score
Destructoid	1 / 10
GameZone	1.5 / 10
Jeuxvideo.com	6 / 20
Nintendo Life	3/10
Nintendo Power	4 / 10
Nintendo World Report	3 / 10

The game received "generally unfavorable reviews" according to the review aggregation website Metacritic. Critics routinely panned the title's overly-simplistic gameplay and sub-par graphics, with Nintendo Power calling it "an incredibly simple side-scrolling romp through boring levels populated by similar looking enemies". Philip J. Reed of Nintendo Life remarked that it was "about as bad as a game can get while still remaining functional", lambasting its repetitive action and slow pacing. In her review for Destructoid, James Stephanie Sterling called ThunderCats "a truly disgusting DS game", drawing attention to its substandard graphics and gameplay, declaring that it "looks like a slightly below average SEGA Genesis title, and plays like a dumbed-down Golden Axe."
