= ThunderCats (2011 TV series) =

American animated television series

- Genre: Action/Adventure; Sword and planet; Superhero
- Based on: ThunderCats by Tobin Wolf
- Developed by: Ethan Spaulding; Michael Jelenic
- Voices of: Will Friedle; Matthew Mercer; Emmanuelle Chriqui; Kevin Michael Richardson; Eamon Pirruccello; Madeleine Hall; Satomi Kōrogi; Robin Atkin Downes; Clancy Brown; Dee Bradley Baker; Corey Burton; Pamela Adlon
- Theme music composer: Kevin Kliesch (Note: Original theme by Bernard Hoffer and Jules Bass.)
- Composer: Kevin Kliesch
- Countries of origin: United States; Japan
- Original language: English
- No. of seasons: 1
- No. of episodes: 26

Production
- Executive producer: Sam Register
- Producers: Michael Jelenic; Ethan Spaulding
- Animator: Studio 4°C
- Editor: Damon Yoches
- Running time: 21–22 minutes
- Production company: Warner Bros. Animation

Original release
- Network: Cartoon Network
- Release: July 29, 2011 – June 16, 2012

ThunderCats is a science fantasy animated television series, developed by Ethan Spaulding and Michael Jelenic for Cartoon Network. A reboot of the original 1980s TV series of the same name (which ran from 1985 to 1989), ThunderCats was produced by American studio Warner Bros. Animation and animated by Japanese studio Studio 4°C, and combined elements of western animation with Japanese anime. The series began with an hour-long premiere on Cartoon Network on July 29, 2011. It is the final animated collaboration of both Arthur Rankin Jr. and Jules Bass, as the former died on January 30, 2014, and the latter died on October 25, 2022.

Following the destruction of their home, the kingdom of Thundera, the ThunderCats (a group of humanoid felidaes) are forced to roam the planet Third Earth, in order to find a way to defeat the evil sorcerer Mumm-Ra, who plans on taking over the universe. Story-wise the series attempts to take a much darker and more cinematic approach than the original show, featuring a lot more focus on characterization and more sophisticated themes.

Initially planned for 52 episodes, the show was cancelled after only one season, as confirmed by ThunderCats art-director Dan Norton in early 2013. Reruns of the show later aired on Adult Swim's Toonami block along with Sym-Bionic Titan.

== Plot ==
On the planet known as Third Earth, the Cats have lived and thrived for generations in the kingdom of Thundera. The Cats are led by Claudus, with his son and heir Lion-O. One night the kingdom is attacked by the Lizard army led by the evil sorcerer Mumm-Ra. With them, the Lizards bring technology (a concept unfamiliar to the Cats). Because of this, Thundera is destroyed, Claudus is killed by Mumm-Ra, and the rest of the Cats are enslaved. A small band of surviving Thunderians led by Lion-O (who wields the powerful Sword of Omens) flee the destroyed city in order to seek out the Book of Omens which is said to have the knowledge needed to defeat Mumm-Ra. Once they find it, the ThunderCats realize that in order for them to defeat Mumm-Ra, they must unite all the different species living on Third Earth. The ThunderCats also discover that they have to find three stones of power which if found by Mumm-Ra will give him power to become the most powerful being in the universe.

== Characters ==
=== ThunderCats ===
The ThunderCats. From left to right: Tygra, WilyKit, Lion-O, WilyKat (foreground), Panthro (background), Snarf (foreground), Cheetara (background).

- Lion-O (voiced by Will Friedle) – The leader/Lord of the ThunderCats. The biological son of King Claudus, Lion-O begins as the misunderstood prince of Thundera, being the only one in the kingdom who believed that technology and Mumm-Ra existed. Because of his beliefs, many felt he was unworthy to become king, often favoring his adoptive brother, Tygra, for the position. After the fall of Thundera and the death of King Claudus, Lion-O becomes the new Lord of the ThunderCats, leading the team to find a way to defeat Mumm-Ra. Even though Lion-O can be a bit of a hot-head, he's by far the most patient and understanding cat of the team. Lion-O also believes that the other races of Third Earth should be treated equally, as seen when Lion-O was defending two persecuted Lizards from some Thunderians. He wields the Sword of Omens, a powerful mystical weapon.
- Tygra (voiced by Matthew Mercer) – The older, adoptive brother of Lion-O. Originally, Tygra was the crown prince of Thundera but as Lion-O was born, he couldn't succeed his adoptive parents as the ruler of Thundera (he's still a prince, next in line for the throne after Lion-O). This resulted in Tygra hating his brother for things beyond Lion-O's control, such as losing the crown and their mother, who had died giving birth to Lion-O. Tygra constantly worked to show that Lion-O wasn't worthy to succeed Claudus as the King of Thundera. Tygra also possesses extreme xenophobia, a jealous streak, and both an inferiority and a superiority complex, all of which often cause friction between the two brothers. Tygra is adept at many weapons, though typically defaults to using his bullwhip.
- Cheetara (voiced by Emmanuelle Chriqui) - One of the last remaining cleric warriors. Cheetara initially served as a mentor to Lion-O, since she never shunned him for his interests in technology and initially seems to support his kindness to other races. Being a cheetah as well as a cleric, she has immense speed and deft agility which is often used in combat. Both Lion-O and Tygra have an interest in her but she ultimately chooses to be with Tygra since the two share a deeper bond. Lion-O later comes to accept them being together.
- Panthro (voiced by Kevin Michael Richardson) - One of King Claudus' most loyal soldiers. Panthro, along with his friend, Grune, were originally sent by Claudus to find the Book of Omens, but their attempted search resulted in Mumm-Ra's release and Grune betraying Panthro. While fighting Grune, Panthro fell down an abyss and was seemingly killed. Panthro survived and constructed the ThunderTank, which he later used to save Lion-O's group from Slithe's platoon in "Song of the Petalars". Though he questioned Lion-O's ability to lead at first, feeling that he was too young to be the King, Panthro eventually accepted him as the new Lord of the ThunderCats. Panthro's weapons consist of nunchucks and the ThunderTank. He later gets a pair of extending cybernetic arms after getting his organic ones cut off by a closing portal.
- Wilykit and Wilykat (voiced by Madeleine Hall and Eamon Pirruccello) - Fraternal twin siblings who were originally from a lower-class family in the countryside, consisting of them, their parents, and younger brother and sister. After the twins lost their father to a tornado, the family began to become more down-trodden, with their mother struggling to make ends meet. Eventually, the Wily-twins decided to run away to find the lost city of El Dara, so they could become rich and help their family. Upon arriving to Thundera, the sister (Wilykit) and brother (Wilykat) were forced to become street urchins and pickpockets in order to survive the slums, with their aspirations being the only thing keeping them going. When the Lizards attacked Thundera, the two managed to escape during the chaos, before eventually teaming up with Lion-O, Tygra, Cheetara and Snarf on their journey. Wilykit uses a special melodic instrument that can hypnotize their opponents.
- Snarf (voiced by Satomi Kōrogi) - A creature of unknown origin and species who was originally Lion-O's personal caretaker when he was a baby. Now that Lion-O is fully grown and can take care of himself, Snarf is more of a pet to the eccentric prince, but still cares very much about Lion-O and is very protective of him. Snarf speaks in a strange language that only Lion-O seems to understand.

=== Antagonists and villains ===
- Mumm-Ra (voiced by Robin Atkin Downes) - The main villain of the series. An eternal servant of the Ancient Spirits of Evil, Mumm-Ra is himself a Spirit of Evil, with the sole purpose of conquering the universe. Centuries prior to the series, Mumm-Ra used advanced technology and dark magic to enslave all the animals into serving him. With them under his command, he sought to gather the four Power Stones, which, if attached to the Sword of Plun-Darr, would give him ultimate power. By managing to take the Warstone (which would later be known as the Eye of Thundera), the ThunderCat known as Leo (with help from the other animals) was able to defeat Mumm-Ra and strip him of the other Power Stones. But when Mumm-Ra's spacecraft was pulled into Third Earth's atmosphere, he entered his tomb to escape the crash and leave everyone else to die. However, the controls were damaged and Mumm-Ra was trapped within his own spacecraft, as the stones and survivors spread across Third Earth. Many centuries later, Mumm-Ra manipulated Grune into releasing him, and was able to orchestrate Thundera's downfall. Now Mumm-Ra not only plans to obtain the Eye of Thundera, but also regain the other three Power Stones and the Sword of Plundarr while gathering some allies to assist him.
- Grune (voiced by Clancy Brown) - Grune was one of King Claudus' most trusted generals, and best friends with Panthro. Being very ambitious and power-hungry Grune attempted to prove himself to Claudus for a promotion, but instead Claudus chose Lynx-O, and assigned Grune and Panthro to find the Book of Omens. Grune felt betrayed and drove himself mad with his own paranoia. Eventually, his jealousy towards the king was used by Mumm-Ra to convince Grune to become his follower and serve a key role in Thundera's downfall. However, Grune also intended to betray Mumm-Ra in the long run prior to leading the attack on the Elephants' village to obtain the Spirit Stone there, resulting with Grune getting sucked into the Astral Plane.
- Slithe (voiced by Dee Bradley Baker) - One of Mumm-Ra's generals and the leader of the Lizards. Slithe serves Mumm-Ra in order for his kind to take revenge on the ThunderCats for generations of persecution. Succeeding in ransacking Thundera, Slithe pursues Lion-O's group before overseeing the search for the Book of Omens and later the Powerstones.
- Addicus (voiced by Robin Atkin Downes) - A bloodthirsty ape-like barbarian who committed crimes against the Bird Nation and was sentenced to a death drop from high up in his captors' domain. However, Addicus is rescued from the fall by Slithe and recruited to be one of Mumm-Ra's new generals. Accepting the proposal, Addicus is allowed to get his revenge on the Bird Nation as Addicus states that they "owe him a last meal".
- Kaynar (voiced by Dee Bradley Baker) - A jackal-like psychopath who is recruited as one of Mumm-Ra's generals. Kaynar was about to be placed in solitary confinement within a Dog Prison when he was recruited by Slithe to be one of Mumm-Ra's new generals. Though preferring his cell, Kaynar accepts Slithe's proposal when he mentions that he can slaughter ThunderCats while allowed to "say goodbye" to his jailers.
- Vultaire (voiced by Michael McKean) - A prefect of Avista who is arrogant and sees himself above those who live on the land, especially the ThunderCats whom he considers to be manipulative barbarians. Though aiding the ThunderCats in fighting off Mumm-Ra's army, Vultaire betrays his fellow Avistans and aligns himself with Mumm-Ra upon witnessing his power firsthand. Vultaire shoots down Tygra and then quotes to Addicus "the enemy of my enemy is my friend". Vultaire joins Slithe, Kaynar, and Addicus into fighting Tygra, Panthro, and Cheetara prior to the latter knocking him out before Tygra can get payback for the bird's treachery. After Mumm-Ra claimed the Tech Stone, Vultaire joined Mumm-Ra's forces into retreating from Avista.
- Pumyra (voiced by Pamela Adlon) - A cat who originally fought during the fall of Thundera before being wounded and left to die under rubble. In her final moments, Pumyra died disillusioned, hateful, and resentful towards Lion-O and company for leaving Thundera, believing they had ignored her pleas for help and had left her and their species to die. Sensing her hate, Mumm-Ra resurrected Pumyra to serve him as his spy and lover, placing her among the captive Thunderian slaves to be sold to Ratar-O where she was later sold to Dobo. From there, meeting Lion-O and managing to keep her need for revenge in check, Pumyra earns his trust and love while serving as a beacon for Mumm-Ra to regain the Sword of Plun-Darr and track the ThunderCats' movement. It was during the siege of Avista that Pumyra reveals her true colors by giving the Tech Stone to Mumm-Ra. After taking hits from both Ro-Bear Bill and Dobo, Pumyra leaves with Mumm-Ra while promising to kill Lion-O the next time they meet.
- Ancient Spirits of Evil (voiced by Jim Cummings, Robin Atkin Downes and Kevin Michael Richardson) - Four dark spirits that are the source of Mumm-Ra's powers and his eternal masters. They resemble a Lizard, a Jackal, a Monkey, and a Vulture. The Ancient Spirits played a role in the creation of both the Sword of Plun-Darr, possessing a Thunderian blacksmith to forge the weapon, and the Sword of Omens, due to the blacksmith retaining the spirits' knowledge to forge a weapon similar to the previous creation. In "Native Son", it's revealed that the Ancient Spirits have been worshiped by the Tiger Clan after their ancestors were exiled to the mountains due to their continued loyalty to Mumm-Ra. When the Tiger Clan was on the verge of dying out from an epidemic, the Ancient Spirits offer to cure them in return that the newborn Tygra (who would grow up to become their stated primary enemy, not Lion-O) be sacrificed. When Javan, the leader of the clan and Tygra's biological father, refused to honor his end of the pact, the Ancient Spirits bound the souls of the Tiger Clan to the living world as shape-shifting shadow monsters that obey their every command. Some years later, a fully-grown Tygra found his way back to his ancestral home and freed his kin of the curse.

=== Other characters ===
- Jaga (voiced by Corey Burton) - Jaga serves as head of Thundera's cleric warriors, possessing knowledge of ancient secrets, superhuman speed and the power to project lightning from his staff. In his prime, he used the "Sword of Omens" in an epic duel against Ratilla. At the start of the series, Jaga sacrifices himself to ensure Lion-O and his group escape. This resulted with him being tortured into revealing the location of the "Book of Omens" to Mumm-Ra, though doing his best to resist the villain's magic when sealed within a lantern, eventually his free will wavers along with his physical form. Though Jaga destroys the lantern that was keeping his soul intact to save Lion-O from Mumm-Ra, part of his soul took residence within the Book of Omens and becomes Lion-O's guide.
- Claudus (voiced by Larry Kenney) - The previous King of Thundera/Lord of the ThunderCats, Claudus is a stern father to Lion-O, his biological son, and Tygra, his adopted son. His wife, the unnamed previous Queen of Thundera/Lady of the ThunderCats, had died giving birth to Lion-O. When Grune and Panthro had fought bravely to get promoted to general, Claudus told them that he has given the job to Lynx-O. Claudus was the one who sent Panthro and Grune to find the Book of Omens. When Lion-O was fighting off some Thunderians who were beating up two imprisoned Lizards (where Lion-O was assisted by Tygra and Cheetara), Claudus arrived to break up the fight. He was convinced by Lion-O to let the Lizards go free and back to their homeland. When Thundera was being attacked by the Lizards, Claudus is murdered by Mumm-Ra (who was disguised as Panthro). Lion-O, Cheetara, and Tygra later hold a funeral pyre for him after escaping with the Sword of Omens. Claudus's voice actor played Lion-O in the original series.
- Lynx-O (voiced by Kevin Michael Richardson) - Lynx-O was a general under Claudus. He first made a cameo as one of Thundera's lookout sentries. It is currently unknown if he survived the fall of Thundera.

== Episodes ==
No.	Title	Directed by	Written by	Original release date	Prod. code	U.S. viewers (millions)
1	"Omens: Part One"	Yoshiharu Ashino & Sean Song	Michael Jelenic & Ethan Spaulding	29 July 2011	101	2.414
Lion-O, always outdone by his adoptive older brother Tygra, undergoes the ritual to be chosen by the Sword of Omens as the next king of Thundera. His father, Claudus, does not feel his son is ready because he is too lenient and easily distracted by flights of fancy like the myth of ancient technology. Soon after, King Claudus welcomes the return of his friend Grune and holds a celebration in both his honor and in memory of the fallen Panthro. During the event, Lion-O defends a pair of captured Lizards and convinces his father to release them. Note: This episode was once titled "The Sword of Omens".
2	"Omens: Part Two"	Yasuhiro Geshi & Rokou Ogiharu	Tab Murphy	29 July 2011	102	2.414
Thundera is attacked by Lizards who have acquired salvaged technology. Grune has joined the Lizards and Panthro is being held hostage. Lion-O comes to his father's aid, allowing Claudus to rescue Panthro. Panthro fatally wounds the king, then reveals himself to be Mumm-Ra (an ancient nemesis of the ThunderCats) in disguise. With his final words, Claudus admits he is proud of Lion-O, then he dies in his son's arms. Lion-O tries to avenge his father, but he and Tygra are captured along with Jaga and Cheetara. However, because of his kindness to the Lizard prisoners that he had freed, Lion-O is given a key (hidden in his meal), allowing him to escape with Tygra to mount a rescue. Mumm-Ra wants the stone in the sword which he claims is his, and tortures Jaga to force him to remove a curse that prevents evil from touching the Sword of Omens. Lion-O and Tygra rescue Jaga and Cheetara (who is revealed to be one of Jaga's clerics). Lion-O grabs the sword to blast Mumm-Ra out into the open, and the rays of the rising sun harm him. Forced to leave Jaga, who sacrifices himself to ensure their escape, Lion-O, Tygra, and Cheetara undertake the quest to find the Book of Omens. Note: This episode was once titled "Ancient Spirits of Evil".
3	"Ramlak Rising"	Yoshiharu Ashino & Sean Song	Todd Casey	5 August 2011	103	1.483
Lion-O, Cheetara, and Tygra hold a funeral pyre for King Claudus, and Lion-O etches the ThunderCats symbol into the broken statue of his father. Determined to get revenge on Mumm-Ra, Lion-O sets out for the Sea of Sands with a reluctant Cheetara and Tygra. As they leave Thundera, Wilykit and Wilykat approach the trio, asking to join in the journey until they find El Dara. Lion-O refuses, but the twins follow anyway. They reach a desert-like ocean, but are captured by a boat crewed by a group of Fishmen. Their captain, Koinelius Tunar, is obsessed with tracking down and killing a creature called Ramlak, which sucked up the waters of the Fishmen's homeland. Lion-O begins to succumb to his own obsession, and helps Tunar track down the creature despite the protests of Tygra and Cheetara. Eventually, the Ramlak snags the ship with its tentacles and tears it to pieces, forcing Lion-O to forget his obsession and save everyone from drowning. Captain Tunar dies as he makes one final strike at Ramlak. After everyone is safe, Lion-O is devoured by Ramlak, but he cuts his way out with the Sword of Omens, releasing the stolen waters from its body. With their home restored, the Fishmen bid the group farewell, and Lion-O accepts the twins into the group after seeing their capability in battle. At Mumm-Ra's pyramid, they find out that Jaga is still alive, but he is now a prisoner inside a dark magic lantern, which Mumm-Ra claims will lead him to the Book of Omens. Note: The episode's plot is an homage to Moby Dick, with the captain of the vessel obsessively hunting the Ramlak.
4	"Song of the Petalars"	Yasuhiro Geshi & Sean Song	J. M. DeMatteis	12 August 2011	104	1.845
As the Lizards approach closer to the ThunderCats, Lion-O wonders if they're fighting a losing battle. When they see a small armada catching up to them, they hide in a thorn bush forest, where they meet the Petalars, who have lived in the forest since their ancestors were swept there by a powerful wind. Lion-O meets a young boy named Emrick, who wants be a hero like him. The ThunderCats join the Petalars in their journey to the Valley of Winds, guided by an ancient map. Lion-O realizes that Emrick ages quickly, and Cheetara learns that the Petalars live for what to everyone else is a day, but to the Petalars is a lifetime. During the journey, Lion-O and Cheetara share an intimate and romantic moment by a campfire until Snarf interrupts. At the gate to the valley, the group is ambushed by three Lizards. The Petalars, grateful to the ThunderCats for aiding them on their journey, stun the Lizards long enough for the ThunderCats to win. Slithe, a Mutant, becomes impatient and orders the forest to be burned down. The ensuing fire causes an updraft, which the Petalars ride and escape. Emrick, now a dying old man, thanks Lion-O for being his friend and reminds him that what matters in life is how fully one lives, before passing away. Now more confident, Lion-O leads the ThunderCats against the Lizards outside the forest. When the Lizards are about to kill them, Panthro arrives in the Thundertank and easily dispatches them.
5	"Old Friends"	Yoshiharu Ashino & Sean Song	Tab Murphy	19 August 2011	105	1.753
Following the ThunderCats' rescue by Panthro, Lion-O attempts to start a conversation with him as he makes repairs to the Thundertank. However, Panthro avoids talking to him and shows little respect for Lion-O's authority. Eventually, Panthro says he needs to get Thundrillium to recharge the Thundertank from a nearby Lizard-controlled mine run by Grune with the aid of the Driller. Panthro plans on doing it alone, but Lion-O, Tygra and Cheetara volunteer to come along. He tells them not to slow him down. While they search for the Thundrillium, Panthro has flashbacks of his friendship with Grune, ranging from meeting on the battlefield and saving Claudus from attacking Lizards, rising through the ranks as officers, being sent to recover the Book of Omens, and Grune's eventual corruption and betrayal to Mumm-Ra, unleashing the villain from his imprisonment. Panthro and Grune meet up in the mine, but before they can have a showdown, the Driller appears and blocks the ThunderCats long enough for Grune to escape. In the course of the battle with Driller, Lion-O uses the Sword of Omens to save Panthro's life and destroy the robot, but its digging causes the mountain to collapse. Cheetara barely gets the Thundrillium they came for. After escaping the mine, Panthro says Lion-O has earned his undying loyalty. When Lion-O asks if he can drive the Thundertank, Panthro says "Not a chance ... my king."
6	"Journey to the Tower of Omens"	Kazuo Nogami & Sean Song	Tab Murphy	26 August 2011	106	1.617
While Lion-O practices with the Sword of Omens, Mumm-Ra forces Jaga to reveal the location of the Tower of Omens, where the Book of Omens is hidden. Lion-O struggles to use the Sword's Sight Beyond Sight until Cheetara encourages him with some very intimate contact. In the jungle, Snarf, while trying to fill his appetite, causes a ruckus which reveals the entrance to a temple leading to the Tower. After entering the temple, each member of the ThunderCats solves one of a series of deadly puzzles and reaches the Tower's entrance. Lion-O uses the Eye of Thundera and finds a button that opens the way to the Tower of Omens, which Tygra opens with his whip. Mumm-Ra reaches the Tower, having located it thanks to Jaga. A fierce battle takes place in the Tower, during which Mumm-Ra transforms into his muscular winged form. Cheetara is momentarily incapacitated and Lion-O attempts to save her. Tygra stops the young king, telling him the Book of Omens is more important than Cheetara. Mumm-Ra and Lion-O square off in battle, with Jaga sacrificing himself to save Lion-O and the others. The ThunderCats claim the Book of Omens, and Lion-O discovers it is actually blank. Note: This episode was once titled "Journey to the Cat's Lair".
7	"Legacy"	Kazuyoshi Takeuchi & Sean Song	Todd Casey	2 September 2011	107	1.650
After recovering the Book of Omens, Lion-O is able to power it up and his soul is sent into the book. He meets Jaga's spirit, who explains that the book is a fusion of magic and technology, and that the book's laws of life, death, and reality are different. Jaga's spirit sends Lion-O into the book's data to see how history unfolded through the eyes of his ancestor Leo. Lion-O discovers that Leo is the commander of the cats, who serve Mumm-Ra as his jailers of the other Animals. Mumm-Ra is after the Warstone, which Lion-O recognizes as the Eye of Thundera. After discovering its location, Mumm-Ra sends forces to the planet below to recover the stone. At the same time, a riot breaks out in the prison bay. Leo and his second-in-command and girlfriend, Panthera, arrest the Jackal and Lizard perpetrators. Lion-O discovers that they are planning a rebellion with the Animals. Leo uses his mages to construct the Sword of Omens and the Gauntlet. Captain Tygus recovers the Warstone, but it is taken by Leo, who then uses it to complete the Sword of Omens. Leo confronts Mumm-Ra, and learns about three other similar stones, and he takes one. Mumm-Ra uses the two remaining stones to create a battle armor powered by magic. Leo is able to force Mumm-Ra off the platform, giving him time to free the Animals and inspire them to fight. Mumm-Ra returns to finish the battle, and seems to be winning, until Leo adds the stone he took to his gauntlet. After the battle, Leo overpowers Mumm-Ra and takes the other two stones, causing Mumm-Ra to become decrepit and old. The ship, damaged by their fight, is hit by a space storm and begins to crash. Mumm-Ra manages to put himself into an emergency capsule, but Leo and Panthera destroy the controls, trapping him inside. Lion-O is pulled out of the simulation, and Jaga reveals that the data had been corrupted by the crash, but there were enough survivors to start civilization. However, the other three stones were lost all over Third-Earth. Lion-O realizes that he must find the three stones using the Book of Omens, and unite the Animals once again. Lion-O returns to his body, waking up with the others standing over him, concerned. Newly confident, he states that he now knows what they must do. Note: When Mumm-Ra is telling Leo (Lion-O) that every species has its place, Mon*Star from SilverHawks is featured on the bottom left and Mako from the series TigerSharks can also be seen.
8	"The Duelist and the Drifter"	Shingo Uchida & Sean Song	Tab Murphy	9 September 2011	108	1.615
Panthro and Tygra try to rig the Book of Omens to the Thundertank, which damages the entire tank. In a nearby town getting supplies, Lion-O has an encounter with a Drifter who warns him to stay away from the town. Lion-O learns that the town doesn't accept Thunderian currency after what happened to Thundera. He enters a sword competition to earn local currency and wins by slicing a stone block in half with the Sword of Omens. He is challenged by the Duelist (a professional swordsman who collects the swords of the opponents he has defeated) to a sword match with the Sword of Omens as the wager. The Drifter reveals that the Sword of Hittanzo is the Duelist's best sword (which he claimed from its swordmaker). Lion-O learns that the Drifter was the sword's maker. The Drifter warns Lion-O that no one can beat his creation. During the match, the Duelist manages to overcome Lion-O and claims the Sword of Omens. Lion-O ends up gaining the unlikely assistance of the Drifter to make another sword. Once the new sword is forged, Lion-O seeks out the Duelist at a nearby tavern and challenges him to a rematch for all of Duelist's swords. The Duelist wants Lion-O to put up his life, as well. During the rematch, Lion-O does his best to evade the Duelist's attacks until the Duelist breaks Lion-O's sword. Lion-O follows the Drifter's "willows are weak" philosophy, and uses this wisdom to disarm the Duelist of his swords. The Drifter observes that he has what he needed to win in himself. When the Duelist tries to attack Lion-O, the Drifter manages to successfully knock down the Duelist and send him out of town. Before going their separate ways, Drifter tells Lion-O that he will return the swords to their rightful owners. Lion-O reunites with Tygra and Panthro.
9	"Berbils"	Yasuhiro Geshi & Takahiro Tanaka	Tab Murphy	28 October 2011	109	1.576
Tiny robot bears called Berbils solicit the help of the ThunderCats to save them from a slave trader named Conquedor, who values their technical and construction skills. The ThunderCats decide to help rescue the enslaved Berbils and defend their village. Meanwhile, Panthro learns that he's not the only "wrench monkey" in the group when he bonds with Ro-Bear-Bill, especially when they come up with a way to drive away the Conquedor, the Trollogs, and the Giantors. Later, Wilykit and Wilykat discover candy fruit, which appears to give them a sugar rush, helping them in the fight.
10	"Sight Beyond Sight"	Yoshiharu Ashino	Todd Casey	4 November 2011	110	1.675
While driving through the desert, Panthro tells Lion-O that the Book of Omens has detected one of the three magical stones. During a race between the Thundertank, Lion-O, Tygra, Cheetara, Wilykit and Wilykat accidentally set off the missiles, which they evade. Arriving outside a giant temple, the ThunderCats meet a group of Elephants led by Aburn and Anet. They ask where the magical stone is. At Anet's suggestion, Lion-O uses the Sword of Omens' power. During the training, the Elephants' village is attacked by the insect-like Wraiths, who are after their harvest. Following the Wraiths' attack, Anet says that they have some food left to harvest. Anet tells Lion-O to be in harmony with the Sword of Omens and vows to get the stolen harvest back. While Wilykit plays her flute, Aburn and Wilykat join in on her performance, which attracts the attention of the other Elephants, who join in as well. Lion-O climbs up a cliff leading to the Wraith's lair and loses his grip when they attack. Lion-O uses his claw to grip onto the side of the cliff as the Wraiths swarm all over him. He dives into a hole in a cliff and discovers that the hole is actually their hive. He escapes and uses the Sword of Omens to seal the cave in order to keep them out. A Stone Giant awakens and finds some dead Wraiths. Later that night, Lion-O returns and learns from Anet that the universe is out of tune, and that their sounds is what kept the Stone Giant away. While the Elephants meditate, the ThunderCats do battle with the Stone Giant. With every attack, the Stone Giant reassembles. The Stone Giant traps the ThunderCats and attacks the Elephants' village, beginning to eat the stone structures. Wilykit and the Elephants play music loud enough for the Stone Giant to crumble. As the Elephants rebuild their village, Anet puts Lion-O through his harmony training again and is able to use the Sword of Omens' power to find one of the magical stones in a nearby hut. When he doesn't find the magical stone there, Anet tells the ThunderCats to go to the Forest of Magi Oar in order to amplify the Sword of Omens' power.
11	"The Forest of Magi Oar"	Tomoya Takahashi	Peter Lawrence	11 November 2011	111	1.432
In the Forest of Magi Oar, the ThunderCats send Wilykit, Wilykat and Snarf to search for firewood. After they return, they start a fire and lay down to rest. Lion-O confronts Tygra about his frustrations that the Sword of Omens is not working. Tygra implies that Lion-O is not the right person for the sword, displaying his jealousy towards Lion-O's confrontations with Cheetara. Lion-O throws a piece of firewood into the fire, releasing several evil spirits around them. When ThunderCats cannot defeat the spirits, they meet the Wood Forgers, who have a talent for using paper magic in combat. The Wood Forgers, led by Zig, lead them back to their home, where they have a School of Paper Arts and a paper mill. They tell Lion-O about a monster bird known as Viragor. The ThunderCats come to their aid when the Forest of Magi Oar is threatened by Viragor, and Cheetara loses her staff to the monster. Lion-O is captured by the monster and abandons the Sword of Omens. Viragor explains to Lion-O that he has protected the forest for decades, and the Wood Forgers are slowly destroying the forest. Lion-O learns that he cannot use his sword against the spirits because it can only be used to defeat evil, which suggests that the spirits are friendly. Lion-O returns on Viragor to tell the rest of the ThunderCats the truth, much to the Wood Forgers' disappointment. They begin to fight, and Lion-O and Viragor crash into the forest. Lion-O finally regains use of his sword and defeats Zig. Viragor makes Cheetara a new staff out of Magi Oar wood. Lion-O uses Sight Beyond Sight and finally locates the stone's next location. Note: This episode was once titled "The War Forgers".
12	"Into the Astral Plane"	Yoshiharu Ashino	Paul Giacoppo	18 November 2011	112	1.334
The ThunderCats travel back to the Elephants' village in the Thundertank, following the true trail to the next stone's location. On the way, Lion-O, Cheetara, and Tygra try to explain what astral planes are to Panthro. Lion-O says he finally has the hang of his sword, and Cheetara congratulates him, saying there is a reason the sword chose him. Lion-O states, "It's probably the same reason she will choose me," after Cheetara goes into the tank. Tygra mutters to himself, "And just like the sword, it's one more thing you don't deserve." Tygra thinks back to when he was a young guard attempting to help a young Cheetara find where the Clerics reside. Cheetara goes to the building and is let in by Jaga. He tells her to work on her patience before she tries to be a Cleric and rejects her. The ThunderCats stop near the village to find that it has been taken over by Grune's forces. Grune is frustrated and annoyed by the Elephants' forgetfulness when they keep telling him that the stone is in the hut. He gives them until the third moon rises to tell him how to get the stone. Meanwhile, Lion-O and Cheetara plan to wait until nightfall to use stealth to attack Grune and the Lizards. Tygra, however, thinks they should attack as soon as possible, using the tank, but eventually joins Lion-O and Cheetara's plan. In another flashback, Cheetara is still sitting outside of the Clerics' building. She smiles at Tygra, which gives him the confidence to approach her, before he is interrupted by Jaga's arrival and rejection of Cheetara once again. After several more days of rejection, Jaga decides that she has learned patience and welcomes her into the Clerics (although she was asleep). The flashback ends, and the ThunderCats are in a field adjacent to the village. Lion-O talks to Cheetara about the competitiveness between Tygra and him, and his worries about the darkness within his older brother. She tells him that it is probably due to his having always lived under his younger brother's shadow. Snarf runs up to the Lizards guarding the village and creates a diversion, leading them straight into Panthro and the fighting begins. During the fight, Wilykit and Wilykat check on the Elephants. They notice Wilykit, which unintentionally blows their stealth operation. Grune forces the ThunderCats to drop all of their weapons and tell him where the stone is. Lion-O agrees to show him, in order to save the Elephants, and Tygra disappears, trying to do something on his own. Lion-O opens the gate to the astral plane with the Sword of Omens. Grune takes the sword and tells his forces to kill the ThunderCats and the Elephants, but Tygra returns in the tank and rescues them. Lion-O teals the sword back, making Grune and his forces abandon the village, and prepares to enter the astral plane. Cheetara wishes him luck and kisses him on the cheek, making Tygra jealous. She insists that he go through the gate as well, saying that the mission is too much for Lion-O to handle alone. Lion-O barely agrees, and lets Tygra enter first, but before Lion-O enters, Anet warns him that he had a vision that Tygra will betray Lion-O before the evening bell. After Lion-O enters, Mumm-Ra (disguised as a crow) goes through the gate as well.
13	"Between Brothers"	Shingo Uchida	Paul Giacoppo	25 November 2011	113	1.433
Panthro scopes out the Lizard army, worried that the ThunderCats are outnumbered and cannot defeat them. Lion-O and Tygra search for the stone in the astral plane. Tygra threatens to keep the stone if he finds it, while Mumm-Ra lurks in the background, hoping that the brothers' rivalry will lead to their deaths. Panthro explains to Wilykit and Wilykat that Grune lost his sabertooth when he ripped it out while fighting Spidera, a mythical giant spider in her nest. Back in the astral plane, Lion-O and Tygra come across a scene from their childhood, in which Tygra dares Lion-O to cross a log over a deep pit in the Forbidden Ruins. Lion-O discovers that Tygra broke the log on purpose while he was crossing. Tygra gets a faux Sword of Omens and begins to fight Lion-O over the position of king. Tygra knocks Lion-O into the pit, then remembers that he ran to get help from King Claudus after Lion-O fell in the pit. He swears in the present that he will never betray Lion-O, and helps him out of the pit. Back at the village, Cheetara holds off the Lizards, preventing them from entering the astral plane, while Panthro fights Grune one-on-one. After meditating, the Elephants decide to help fight off the Lizards, and they manage to drive them away. Lion-O and Tygra battle Mumm-Ra in the astral plane and Lion-O discovers that the stone is what holds the astral plane together. He puts it in his gauntlet. The ThunderCats defeat Mumm-Ra, but the astral plane slowly begins to deteriorate. Panthro, still fighting Grune, forces him into the closing gateway to the astral plane. Grune is sucked into the gate, along with Panthro's arms. Later, the ThunderCats hold a celebration at the village, Panthro is recovering with Snarf's help. Anet tells Lion-O that Tygra has yet to betray him because the evening bell has yet to ring. Cheetara confesses her feelings to Tygra, remembering his gift, the Day Astrid flower (each petal is said to have trapped a day of life in it) he gave her while she waited outside the Cleric's, giving her strength. She kept the heart of the flower since then, in memory of his kindness. They share a passionate kiss. Unbeknownst to them, Lion-O sees them and is devastated just as the evening bell rings.
14	"New Alliances"	Yoshiharu Ashino	J. M. DeMatteis	24 March 2012	114	N/A
The ThunderCats have been running a series of ambushes to lower morale within the ranks of Mumm-Ra. Because there has been no true fighting cause within the Lizard Army, there have been mass desertions, weakening Mumm-Ra's forces. To remedy this, Mumm-Ra gives orders to Slithe to recruit Kaynar (a Jackal) and Addicus (a Monkey) to be his new generals. Although both are murderous maniacs who have committed crimes even Mumm-Ra considers vile, he is sure that their presence will frighten the Lizards back into line. At the Bird Nation, Addicus is about to be executed by having his ropes cut, dropping him from a high cliff. He is denied a last meal by the Bird Nation as the executioner cuts the ropes. As Addicus falls, he is saved by Slithe. Meanwhile, Lion-O is emotionally compromised after losing Cheetara to Tygra. Unable to figure out why Cheetara made such a choice, he vents his frustration towards her as he feels he was emotionally mislead and betrayed. Cheetara says that the reason she behaved and acted as she did was because Jaga asked her to do so. Finding her excuse unacceptable, Lion-O informs her that her choices changed everything between them. The Berbils are working to fine-tune a new pair of cybernetic arms for Panthro, but it requires a few adjustments. At an underground prison, Kaynar is about to be placed in solitary confinement after killing 11 prisoners. Before Kaynar can be placed in his cell, the dog guards are shot by Slithe, who offers Kaynar an opportunity to join up with Mumm-Ra. Kaynar asks if he can say "goodbye to some of his pals" as he moves in to dispose of the two dog guards. One night, the team spotted the Lizard Army escorting a group of deserters that the ThunderCats defeated earlier. Lion-O wants to "keep up the pressure" against the Lizard Army but Tygra disagrees. Cheetara, who in the past shared Lion-O's outlook that the animals should be united, warns Lion-O that an enemy who might turn on them the next day isn't worth the risk. Shocked that Cheetara would voice such a remark and angered that she has taken Tygra's side, Lion-O charges off alone and encounters Kaynar, Addicus, and Slithe. Tygra and Cheetara come to his aid, but Tygra fails and is captured, and Cheetara surrenders to save him, causing Lion-O to lose to Slithe. As the trio face their executions, Pathro arrives in his newly upgraded Thundertank and newly installed cybernetic arms for battle. Panthro helps the three escape, but Cheetara's and Tygra's relationship continues to affect Lion-O's leadership and judgment.
15	"Trials of Lion-O: Part One"	Yoshiharu Ashino	Todd Casey	31 March 2012	115	N/A
In a mountainous region, Lion-O seeks guidance from the Book of Omens for their next potential course: upwards. The ThunderCats make their way up the mountain, but they either oppose or share their doubts regarding Lion-O's judgement as their course puts them in danger. Lion-O is angered by the doubts and disrespect of his group. He has the group take a break after discovering some nearby Candy-Fruit, the group is ambushed by Slithe, Kaynar, Addicus, and the Lizard Army, and the ThunderCats are defeated. Lion-O attempts to fight back, but has lost both the Sword of Omens and the gauntlet (containing the Spirit Stone) after Slithe threatened to have Addicus hurt Wilykit. Lion-O manages to grab back his gauntlet, but Kaynar knocks him off the mountain and into the river. Unwilling to return to Mumm-Ra empty-handed, Slithe commands his group to search and recover Lion-O's body while holding the ThunderCats captive. Trapped under the river by rubble, Lion-O drowns, but the Spirit Stone activates to save him. Lion-O finds himself in the spirit realm, where Jaga tells him that he is dead; however, thanks to the spirit stone, he has the opportunity to be resurrected once he completes a set of tests designed to help him overcome his weaknesses. The first test takes place in the simulated slums of Thundera. A false "Wilykit" and "Wilykat" appear before him, telling him he can pass to the next level by getting their key. The twins create false clones of themselves, and Lion-O has to figure out which are the real ones in order to retrieve the key. Lion-O learns to use his other senses, primarily smell, rather than rely only on his eyes to track down the real twins, and he successfully graduates to the next test. In the next test, a false Cheetara tells Lion-O that it's a race to the center of a grand labyrinth to obtain the next key. Lion-O thinks the arrangement is unfair, as Cheetara's speed would give her an advantage, but she gives Lion-O a head start. Lion-O finds inspiration in flight and takes a giant bird to help him cut through the maze and he passes this test. Back in the living world, the ThunderCats are shackled and being transported to Mumm-Ra. With Lion-O dead, Tygra is the new king and the group looks to him for survival. Tygra distracts the generals and, while they beat him, the twins free themselves from their bonds and help the ThunderCats escape. At a disadvantage, Slithe's group retreats, but with the Sword of Omens in their possession. Tygra vows to get the Sword of Omens back.
16	"Trials of Lion-O: Part Two"	Yutaka Kagawa	Will Friedle	7 April 2012	116	N/A
The surviving ThunderCats make it to Mumm-Ra's temple (the original spacecraft that crash-landed on Third Earth). Having completed half of his trials in the spirit world, Lion-O finds himself in a test of strength against Panthro, where he must knock Panthro out of the ring before the sands within the hourglass run out. Lion-O cannot ring-out Panthro until he remembers that he is the king and simply orders Panthro out of the ring. Panthro tells Lion-O that his greatest strength is being a leader. Meanwhile, the ThunderCats quietly take out the external Lizard guards and Panthro helps gain entry to the ship. The alarm goes off and alerts the internal Lizard guards. Tygra is unable to make a decision with incoming company, but Wilykit quickly charms the guards with her ocarina long enough to allow the ThunderCats to pass by. The guards have forgotten the intrusion and think it was a false alarm. In his final trial, Lion-O goes up against Tygra (in the same arena where he previously lost to Tygra) in order to get the final key and regain his life. Lion-O realizes it's a test of his control over his emotions and is easily angered by the false Tygra. Meanwhile, the ThunderCats move through the ventilation shafts and see Mumm-Ra attempting to extract the Eye of Thundera from the Sword of Omens using a spell with his Lizard Priests. Despite opposition to his decision, Tygra decides to attack and attempt to retrieve the Sword of Omens. Mumm-Ra uses a powerful electrical attack that neutralizes all the ThunderCats and detains them. In the spirit world, Jaga tells Lion-O that he failed, and that Mumm-Ra has obtained the Sword of Omens and captured the ThunderCats. Desperate to save his comrades, Lion-O offers his soul to Jaga as a sacrifice to return him to the living. Jaga tells him that the Soul Stone will return him to his body until sunrise, where his soul will then be sent to Limbo for all eternity. Jaga asks if he understands the consequences of returning to his body, and Lion-O accepts the deal. He awakens underwater and makes his way to the surface. He grabs onto a bird in order to get up the cliff. Spotting the drawings left by Wilykit, Lion-O follows her trail until he reaches Mumm-Ra's temple. Within the holding cells, Tygra is unsure of the next move and regrets questioning Lion-O's decisions as they always worked out in the past. While others are in doubt, Wilykit still thinks that Lion-O will come for them. Lion-O infiltrates Mumm-Ra's temple, where he finds Slithe, Kaynar, and Addicus. Lion-O tricks them into one of the cells and frees the other ThunderCats. The group is happy about his return, but wonders how he survived; there isn't time to explain, and he focuses them on reclaiming the Sword of Omens. Mumm-Ra makes a second attempt to remove the Eye of Thundera out of the Sword of Omens until Panthro blows down the door. While the other ThunderCats fight the Lizard soldiers, Mumm-Ra transforms and battles Lion-O, who uses the Spirit Stone's power to block Mumm-Ra's attacks. Lion-O successfully reclaims the Sword of Omens and uses its beam attack to weaken Mumm-Ra. The ThunderCats escape to a safe distance from Mumm-Ra's ship. As the sun begins to rise, Lion-O tells everyone that he must go. Baffled by his words, the ThunderCats want answers as Jaga's spirit appears to explain that Lion-O has paid the ultimate price, that the trials were a test of Lion-O's skills and heart. Lion-O is given a second chance at life in order to lead the ThunderCats to victory. Still confused over what is happening, Lion-O begins to fill the group in on the details of his trials, starting from his death.
17	"Native Son"	Mitsuo Kusakabe	Tab Murphy	14 April 2012	117	N/A
In a cold mountainous region, Lion-O and Tygra search for a new route. Following Tygra's lead for a shortcut, the duo comes across a cave, which leads them to the lost Tiger Clan. The tigers lead them to the tiger leader, Javan (Tygra's biological father). Javan explains that their descendants, the tigers, continued to side with Mumm-Ra after the rebellion and were exiled by the other cats as a result. They prospered in their secluded society. The tigers were curious to know how Tygra became a prince among Lions and Tygra briefly explains his adoption into the Thunderian royal family. Tygra wants answers for being sent away. Javan cannot explain himself and says that it was for his own protection. He suggests to the duo that they leave before danger comes. Moments later, they are attacked by shadow creatures. Surviving the fight, Tygra has a better impression of his father and decides to catch up on lost time. Lion-O tells Tygra that he couldn't find the tracks of the shadow monsters and that, oddly, the tigers aren't defending themselves. Tygra dismisses Lion-O's suspicions and considers it a negative reaction. Following his intuition, Lion-O uses Sight Beyond Sight and discovers that the shadow creatures are the Tigers. Javan arrives and explains that there was an infectious epidemic, and they sought aid from the Ancient Spirits. The spirits agree to save the tigers in exchange for Tygra's life, as he would eventually grow up to oppose them. Javan cannot bring himself to kill Tygra and sends baby Tygra away in a balloon, resulting in the Ancient Spirits placing a curse on the Tiger Clan until Tygra is sacrificed. Javan tells Lion-O to take Tygra and leave before some of the other Tigers attempt to kill Tygra. Meanwhile, some of the Tigers led by Caspin decided to break the curse before the sun sets. To save Tygra, Javan makes up an excuse to anger Tygra, claiming he wasn't worthy of tiger society and being his successor. Angered, Tygra is prepared to leave when the rogue tiger group comes after Tygra. Javan comes to Tygra's aid and kills Caspin in self-defense, saying that it didn't have to be this way. Before dying, Caspin says that it had to be this way, since it was Javan's fault that the entire Tiger Clan was cursed. The tigers begin to transform into the shadow monsters again, and Javin confesses that his actions have turned him into a monster, as he and the other Tigers transform again and attempt to kill the duo. Lion-O and Tygra fight the shadow monsters. In his shadow monster form, Javan grabs Tygra and attempts to choke him to death. Tygra understands what his father gave up for him. He forgives his father, and his humility ultimately breaks the curse, causing the shadow monsters to regress back into the Tigers. Javan states to Tygra that the Tigers are neither dead nor alive, but rather something in between, and they can now go home as he and the Tigers fade away. Javan leaves his whip behind for Tygra before disappearing. Gaining and losing his clan in a single day, Tygra wonders if he'll continue to lose those he cares about. Lion-O tells Tygra that he won't lose him and that they still must find a shortcut through the mountains.
18	"Survival of the Fittest"	Riki Matsuura	J. M. DeMatteis	21 April 2012	118	N/A
While Tygra and Lion-O continue their search for a path, the remaining team remains in the Thundertank at the bottom of the mountain. Bored and hungry, Wilykit and Wilykat whine about not having food. Panthro decides to teach the kittens about survival. Deciding to join in, Cheetara suggests a boys-vs-girls match: Wilykit teamed with Cheetara and Wilykat teamed with Panthro in a hunt for a meal. Panthro attempts to teach Wilykat about tracking and use of traps with a male Chib-Chib as the target, but Wilykat, unable to bear the idea of killing another animal, helps the Chib-Chib to run free. Meanwhile, Cheetara shows Wilykit how to masking their scents in an attempt to kill a female Chib-Chib. However, Wilykit also ruins the hunt, as she cannot kill, either. Seeing that drastic measures are needed, Panthro and Cheetara decide to force the twins to hunt on their own, forbidding them to return to the Thundertank until they have food. A flashback scene reveals that the kittens are the eldest of four children. Their father was an ambitious farmer who died in a tornado, leaving their mother to have to make ends meet. Inspired by their late father's tale of a city of great riches, Eldara, the two decide to leave their home in search of it. Wilykat believes that their leaving would allow their mother to focus more on herself and their younger siblings until they return from finding Eldara with enough riches to provide for their family for life. However, their search leads them to starvation in Thundera's slums and they quickly learn that survival would mean compromising their ethics and becoming thieves. In the forest, the twins accept the idea of killing the male Chib-Chib out of survival, until they realize that the female Chib-Chib Wilykit saved is the male's mate, and they have two baby Chib-Chibs. While the two kittens decide not to go through with destroying the Chib-Chib family, a boar-like predator called a Comolbur arrives and attacks the Chib-Chibs. Unwilling to let the Chib-Chib family die, the kittens successfully distract, then tie up, the Comolbur. Grateful for their help, the Chib-Chibs lead the twins to a trove of fruit. Successful in getting food, the kittens victoriously return with sweet bounty and Panthro believes the two have potential to survive on their own after all.
19	"The Pit"	Mitsuo Kusakabe	Todd Garfield	28 April 2012	119	N/A
The ThunderCats reach a city inhabited by dogs, who host a gladiator-style arena for both entertainment and judgment. The group learns of a cat fighting in the arena and goes to see for themselves, while Wilykit and Wilykat go to explore the town and get food with Snarf keeping an eye on them. The group watches a preview of what the dogs call entertainment and witness the cat, Pumyra, defeat the robot that the previous fighters could not beat. They go to the leader, Dobo's, viewing platform to plead for Pumyra's release and learn that she must win 100 battles to gain her freedom, and also that Panthro and Dobo are old friends. Lion-O isn't satisfied with Dobo's choice and sneaks into the cells to break Pumyra out. However, as he tries to release her, Pumyra begins to yell at him with anger and rage because he abandoned his kingdom and his people. The guards awake and Dobo appears, taking the Sword of Omens and the Gauntlet, telling Lion-O that, since he disobeyed his law, he will have to fight against Pumyra to earn his freedom. Dobo returns the Sword and Gauntlet to Panthro and the others, and he tells them that, if Lion-O wins this fight, he will go free. Cheetara and Tygra try to convince him to release them both, but he refuses. Panthro tells Dobo not to let their past affect his judgment. Dobo and Panthro were teamed up in The Pit as a joke, a war prisoner cat and a thieving dog, but they rose in battles and became famed fighters. However, Panthro escaped one night and left Dobo alone with all the enemies they made. Panthro regretted his choice, but Dobo said it was the best thing that happened to him, because it gave him the strength to become leader of the city. However, the betrayal caused him to lose faith in loyalty from cats. Meanwhile, Wilykit and Wilykat run into a fellow pickpocket raccoon named Tookit, who says he is a "kleptovoyant" and, while they talk about how they are as good a thief as him, Wilykit discovers his Flink is missing and Wilykat's flute is gone, too. The battle between Lion-o and Pumyra begins and Lion-o refuses to fight her, but she has no problem with fighting a weakling king. During the fight, Wilykit and Wilykat try to convince Tookit to return their stuff, but he refuses unless they can prove they are as good as they say they are as thieves. The group pleads for Dobo to stop the fight, but he refuses, saying that this battle shows how loyal cats truly are, until Panthro explains why he left that night. Panthro tells him that the next battle was to be a death match against Dobo himself, and Dobo asks if he ran because he was afraid he would have lost. Panthro says that he was afraid that he might have won. Wilykit and Wilykat steal a cane, a button, and a blanket and return to Tookit and tell him they won the "contest" and to return their stuff so that they can hurry and return the random items they just stole. However, it is too late and they are pursued. Tookit uses the items Wilykit and Wilykat took to save them. The kitens think he is not such a bad guy after all, until they realize he still has their stuff. At the fight, Lion-O continues to stand up after taking a beating from Pumyra's attacks, stating that he promised to stand by her. Pumyra learns he is truly a strong and caring king, and refuses to continue the fight. Dobo says that since both forfeit the match, they must be sentenced to death, until he hears his people telling him to let them live. After learning why Panthro left, and witnessing the loyalty between Pumyra and Lion-O, he lets them live and grants them both their freedom. With old wounds fully healed and new friends made, Lion-O ask Pumyra where the other ThunderCats are that were taken by the lizards. She tells him Mount Plun-Darr.
20	"Curse of Ratilla"	Tomoya Takahashi	Todd Casey	5 May 2012	120	1.551
Arriving at Mount Plun-Darr, the ThunderCats and Pumyra discover that the Thunderian slaves are being forced to excavate the Sword of Plun-Darr for Ratar-O and his Rats.
21	"Birth of the Blades"	Masayuki Kato	Will Friedle	12 May 2012	121	N/A
After defeating Ratar-O, the ThunderCats do not have enough time to hide the Sword of Plun-Darr, as Mumm-Ra and his Lizard Army have already arrived. Pumyra suggests that they use the Sword of Plun-Darr to help lure away the Lizard Army through the mines while giving time for the refugee cats to escape. Lion-O decides to split the team: himself and Pumyra distracting the Lizard Army, while the remaining ThunderCats stand by at the Thundertank. As Lion-O and Pumrya run through the mines, Mumm-Ra uses his connection to the Sword of Plun-Darr to act as a tracking beacon. Every time the two think they are ahead, Mumm-Ra's forces manage to corner them, and they are forced to flee. A flashback reveals the origins of both the Sword of Plun-Darr and Sword of Omens. Mumm-Ra was directed by the Ancient Spirits to collapse the star of Plun-Darr in order to harvest its ore to produce a weapon to channel the Powerstones' energy. After successfully destroying the star at a cost of billions, the entire star system was reduced to a small collection of ore, which Mumm-Ra collected to forge the Sword of Plun-Darr. Disillusioned by Mumm-Ra's methods to achieve peace, Leo secretly recovered the discarded shards of the ore to secretly forge the Sword of Omens. In the present, Lion-O and Pumrya split up in an attempt to distract their enemies. However, Mumm-Ra captures Pumyra and regains his sword. Lion-O and Mumm-Ra fight and Lion-O gains the upper-hand, but he choeses to save Pumrya's life over preventing Mumm-Ra from retrieving the Sword of Plun-Darr. When sunlight starts pouring into the holes in the mine made during the battle, Mumm-Ra retreats. Although the Sword of Plun-Darr is lost to Mumm-Ra, Lion-O gains Pumrya's respect. However, the gravity of their situation has increased.
22	"The Forever Bag"	Yoshiharu Ashino	Tab Murphy	19 May 2012	122	1.755
While the elder team members are busy at Mount Plun-Darr, Wilykat, Wilykat, and Snarf continue their search for Tookit. After they bump into him again, Tookit takes the trio to introduce them to the Forever-bag and its child inhabitants Albo, Gusto, and Jenyo. Tookit manipulates the children he finds and converts them into his assistant thieves. By the time Wilykit an Wilykat realize they've been played and forced to be thieves, the siblings come up with a scheme to win their freedom and that of the younglings. After stealing a prized jewel, the twins refuse to give Tookit his prized jewel and trick him into admitting his crimes and manipulating children. The Constable exonerates them. Tookit is arrested and remanded to The Pit, but he already has a means of escape with a pin he stole earlier.
23	"Recipe for Disaster"	Riki Matsuura	Tab Murphy	26 May 2012	123	N/A
On their way back to Dog City to meet with the ThunderKittens and Snarf, the five adult ThunderCats pause in the middle of a forest to think about their next move, while Mumm-Ra spies on them using his scrying pool. Cheetara asks Panthro and Tygra where Lion-O and Pumyra are, and Panthro replies that they are out gathering firewood. Pumyra helps a baby winged frog that has fallen out of its nest. Lion-O has trouble expressing his feelings for Pumyra and gives her a flower to which she has a terrible allergic reaction. The team meets a Wolo (pronounced "wallow") named Ponzi who gives them a "miracle elixir" that he promises will solve all their problems, including Pumyra's swollen head. After Ponzi leaves, the ThunderCats are attacked by the demonic dinosaur Sycorax, which Mumm-Ra had resurrected to serve as his vassal. When he attacks them, Lion-O accidentally breaks the bottle of elixir, which temporarily disables Sycorax. Realizing its potential, the five chase after Ponzi to get more of the elixir. However, because Wollo thinks they are disatisified customers out for revenge (like others he scammed earlier), Ponzi inadvertently crashes his cart in an attempt to escape, destroying his entire supply of elixir. The team agrees to help him make more, which will require the leaves of the rare Caracara Tree. Back at the camp, Lion-O tries to make Pumyra notice him by using a love potion that Ponzi gave him. Tygra drinks it instead of Pumyra, causing him to temporarily act loopy and drugged, but only towards other males. When they reach their destination the next morning, the team strips the Caracara Tree of its leaves to give to Ponzi to produce his elixir in the distiller. However, complications arise when Ponzi's caterpillar-like pet, Lucy, devours all the leaves and begins to cocoon herself to the tree after Ponzi yells at her. The team is forced to face Sycorax/Mumm-Ra on their own once again while Ponzi attempts to use the last leaf in the hopes that it will be enough. During the fight, Lion-O saves Pumyra and, impressed with his combat skills, she thanks him by kissing his cheek. The elixir turns out to be a "bad batch," as Ponzi calls it. The fight turns in Mumm-Ra's favor until Lucy emerges from her cocoon in her adult form, which resembles a Pokémon-style Mothra, and he is able to crystallize Sycorax due to the leaves she ingested. The Sycorax shatters as Mumm-Ra's raven form emerges from the remains and flies away. Ponzi thanks the ThunderCats, but declines their offer to travel together. Tygra recovers from the effects of the love potion and all ends well, for now.
24	"The Soul Sever"	Kenichi Maejima	Brandon Easton	2 June 2012	124	1.428
After making it back to the City of Dogs, Panthro wonders why the Book of Omens is pointing to the sky. Lion-O runs into Jorma, who survived the attack on Thundera, and has made it home. Studying the book, Jorma concludes that one of the stones the ThunderCats are after is somewhere in the sky. Exploring a secret scrap pile where new scrap metal lands after falling from the sky, Lion-O, Tygra, Panthro, and Jorma are attacked by Necromech robots, steal the Book of Omens. Jorma lends them Flicker, a mini-bot that can track the energy signature of the book. Tracking the Necromech robots, Lion-O, Tygra, and Panthro discover that they work for a mysterious figure named Soul Sever. They track down the Soul Sever, an alien being converted into a cyborg before killing his benefactors for to their disapproval of his intentions. Lion-O learns that he plans to use the power of the Book of Omens in order to bind the souls of his deceased wife and children into robotic bodies. Though he wants the three ThunderCats to leave his domain, Tigra's attempt to steal the book back convinces the Soul Server to use them as test subjects. Though Flicker is damaged by Soul Sever after freeing Lion-O and Panthro, Tygra is not as fortunate, as his soul animates a robot body. However, the metallic creature goes berserk as it uses surrounding metals to upgrade itself and consumes the souls of Soul Sever's family from the pods in order to continue to function. Realizing what he has done, Soul Sever reveals that a powerful charge equal to the Book of Omens can short-circuit the robot and restore Tygra's soul to his body, yet expresses his reluctance, as his family has nowhere to return to. However, after Lion-O tells the Soul Sever that letting his family go is the only thing he can do for them, he lets Flicker use a GigaSpark. The plan works and Tygra returns to his body while the souls of Soul Sever's family pass on. After seeing how Flicker suffered for causing the surge which saved Tygra, Lion-O observes how technology's use is dependent on the users and how they use the technology. The ThunderCats retrieve their book and find a potential means by which to reach the second stone. The grieving Soul Sever, flabbergasted by Flicker's sacrifice, wonders if the small machine has a soul as it restarts.
25	"What Lies Above: Part One"	Shin'ichi Matsumi	Paul Giacoppo	9 June 2012	125	1.596
The ThunderCats find a way to reach the next stone and arrive at the floating city of Avista, which is ruled by Birds. They meet Vultaire and try to convince him to give them the third stone that they find here before Mumm-Ra arrives. However, as a concerned Wilykat and Wilykit leave Avista to get help, Pumyra worsens the group's predicament when she abducts Vultaire and attempts to take the Tech Stone, even after being told that Avista needs it for its people to survive.
26	"What Lies Above: Part Two"	Shin'ichi Matsumi	Paul Giacoppo	16 June 2012	126	1.523
After Pumyra's attempt to steal the Tech Stone ends in utter failure, the ThunderCats are tossed into an automated trash disposal that is set to drop them to their deaths. However, an attack from Mumm-Ra's army allows them to convince Vultaire to reconsider killing them, and instead let them help him defend Avista from Mumm-Ra's forces. Panthro and Pumyra use cannons to shoot down Mumm-Ra's air forces, while Tygra aids Vultaire and the Avistan Guards by engaging the enemy in a dogfight. However, Mumm-Ra arrives and wipes out the bulk of the Avistan Guards. Vultaire accepts Mumm-Ra's offer to join him, while Pumyra takes Lion-O to the chamber to take the Tech Stone. Mumm-Ra arrives and takes out Pumyra before Lion-O engages him in battle. The stones Lion-O obtained resonate with him and his gauntlet arm is encased in armor. The Tech Stone gets loose during the fight, causing the city to fall. As Lion-O and Mumm-Ra scramble to retrieve it, Pumyra picks it up and, in a treacherous turn of events, gives it to Mumm-Ra, saying that Lion-O is her King but Mumm-Ra is her Master. Mumm-Ra calls Pumyra his beloved as she bends a knee to him and kisses his gauntlet, and he uses the stone to boost his own powers. Horrified, Lion-O learns that Pumyra was mortally wounded during the fall of Thundera and died watching him, Tygra, and Cheetara leave the kingdom as she attempted to call them for help. Her hatred of Lion-O called out to Mumm-Ra, and he used the Ancient Spirits of Evil to resurrect her to serve as his lover and spy, enabling him to track the ThunderCats' every move. Even with the aid of the rest of the ThunderCats, Lion-O is unable to defeat Mumm-Ra. However, having gone throughout Third Earth to enlist the aid of the four groups Lion-O helped during their journey (the Berbils, the Fishmen, the Elephants, and the Dogs) and stored them in the Forever Bag for the trip back to Avista, Wilykat and Wilykit arrive at the nick of time, and they sic their reinforcements on Mumm-Ra and Pumyra. In the hopes that Avista's fall will kill everyone, Mumm-Ra and Pumyra retreat, and Pumyra promises to kill Lion-O the next time they meet. Panthro steps up to land the city, and the Avistans are grateful to the ThunderCats for saving them. Cheetara assures the Avistans that the Berbils will get Avista up and running again. Seeing Lion-O hurt from Pumyra's betrayal, Wilykit assumes Cheetara's abandoned role of cleric and encourages her king, pointing out that the Animals are uniting under him, as well as reminding him that there is still one stone of power to find. Wilykit presents Lion-O with his Sword of Omens and the young lord holds the blade high.

=== Short ===
Title	Directed by	Storyboarded by	Original release date
"Snarf: Butterfly Blues"	Takuo Tominaga	Ben Jones	December 6, 2011
Snarf is in charge of watching Baby Lion-O. When a butterfly catches Baby Lion-O's attention, he follows it through town, narrowly avoiding disaster along the way. Snarf does his best to catch up with and save Baby Lion-O, but ends up suffering the consequences that Baby Lion-O escapes. At the end of the day, when Snarf believes he failed by losing Baby Lion-O, the butterfly returns, along with Baby Lion-O. King Claudus congratulates Snarf on a job well done and appoints him as Baby Lion-O's personal caretaker. As Snarf prepares Baby Lion-O for bed, several butterflies appear, much to Baby Lion-O's delight, and to Snarf's chagrin.

== Production and development ==
Despite being based on the original 1980s TV series, the 2011 version differs greatly from it, with many aspects of the original show's story and characters being different. When comparing the original series to the 2011 reboot, producer Michael Jelenic stated that "the old show felt more like a Saturday morning animated series and this feels more like a movie". Jelenic also said, that their take "is definitely darker but we've put a lot more focus on the characters and the arc, and because of that, we might have a few more sophisticated themes going on in this". Michael Jelenic stated that before work even began on the series, the makers mapped out an entire beginning, middle and end for the show's storyline, which was then broken-up into 13-episode arcs. Some stories from the original show were seen in these arcs.

The animation for the series was done by Warner Bros. Animation and Studio 4°C. According to supervising director of Studio 4 °C, Shinichi Matsumi, they were handed the basic concepts for the show by Warner Bros. and were assigned to adjust them into the Japanese anime design. Matsumi believed that they succeeded in pushing the style of anime in the show with a variety of visual elements, such as scene compositions, effects and colors, as well as the action scenes. Kevin Kliesch composed the music for ThunderCats, for which he took inspiration from John Williams, James Horner and Jerry Goldsmith, among others. Despite being orchestral, Kliesch also incorporated elements of electronics into the series' music.

== Home media ==
Season	DVD and Blu-ray release date			
Season	Title	Region 1	Region 2	Region 3
1	Season One • Book One	October 18, 2011	N/A	N/A
1	Season One • Book Two	June 5, 2012	N/A	N/A
1	Season One • Book Three	October 2, 2012	N/A	N/A
1	The Complete Series (Blu-ray)	November 11, 2014	N/A	N/A
Short	N/A	N/A	N/A	N/A

== Reception ==
ThunderCats premiered on July 29, 2011 and attained a rating of 0.8, with over 2.4 million viewers. The highest rated show for that night received a 1.1, which makes the ThunderCats' 0.8 a successful showing. The premiere episode of ThunderCats received very positive reviews, with some calling it "amazing" and "epic".

One of the things the premiere was praised for was its anime-inspired visuals. ComicBookMovies.com called the animation "beautiful" and "very fluid in motion", while Jeff Hidek, of Star News Online, described it as "sleekier(sic) [and] edgier", than the animation of the 1980s show. Brian Lowry, of Variety, also felt that the show had a "cool look". Many were also happy with the changes made to the story and characters. Kenneth Carter of The Birmingham News called the story "multi-faceted", and the characters layered and flawed. He also felt that the character's introductions didn't seem rushed, and that "we get a chance to get to know them a little before the action begins". Edward Adams of Creative Loafing described the show as "moody and character driven, highlighting the all-too-human flaws you'd expect from an action series like this", while IGN's Matt Fowler described the show's re-imagined world as "so original and strange, that even clichés tend to come across like revelations".

ThunderCats was also praised for the changes it made to its source material. Jeff Hidek felt that ThunderCats "successfully echoes the fun, wonder and all-around coolness of the original characters while ditching some of the dated trappings of '80s-syndication". Ken Tucker of Entertainment Weekly called the show "a rather canny rethinking of a series that probably didn't take a lot of thinking to conceive in the first place", while Edward Adams also said that "where in the original series the environment was bright and colorful, in the pilot episodes [of the 2011 series], the tones are much darker". Despite the changes the show made to the original TV series, many still recommended the 2011 series to fans of the original. Both Kenneth Carter and Edward Adams called the show "a pleasant surprise", with Carter adding that "if you have fond memories of ThunderCats, then you’ll love what you see here". Matt Fowler felt similarly, saying that "if you have an affinity for the old series, then you'll find ThunderCats somewhat entertaining".

Despite the positive response, some aspects of the show were criticized. Variety's Brian Lowry felt the series was designed as a marketing ploy for a new ThunderCats toyline, and that the show "represents a throwback to the drearily toy-driven 1980s, a period that seems destined to keep returning as much out of pragmatism as nostalgia".

== Soundtrack ==
ThunderCats (Music from the Warner Bros. Animation Series)

Soundtrack album by Kevin Kleisch
- Released: October 21, 2012
- Length: 113:51
- Label: La-La Land Records
- Producers: Kevin Kleisch; Dan Goldwasser

A two-disc soundtrack album of Kevin Kleisch's music was released by La-La Land Records in October 2012, featuring suites from all but two of the episodes ("Trials of Lion-O, Part 2" and "The Pit"). The series' theme, by Jules Bass and Bernard Hoffer, also features.

Disc 1
No.	Title	Length
1.	"ThunderCats Main Theme"	0:12
2.	"The Sword of Omens"	4:58
3.	"Ancient Spirits of Evil"	10:28
4.	"Ramlak Rising"	9:11
5.	"Song of the Petalars"	6:01
6.	"Old Friends"	8:21
7.	"Journey to the Tower of Omens"	6:47
8.	"Legacy"	4:24
9.	"The Duelist and the Drifter"	5:37
10.	"Berbils"	3:13
11.	"Sight Beyond Sight"	4:46

Disc 2
No.	Title	Length
12.	"The Forest of Magi Oar"	1:28
13.	"Into the Astral Plane"	1:21
14.	"Between Brothers"	6:52
15.	"New Alliances"	3:45
16.	"Trials of Lion-O, Part 1"	2:52
17.	"Native Son"	6:03
18.	"Survival of the Fittest"	1:30
19.	"Curse of Ratilla"	3:23
20.	"Birth of the Blades"	2:56
21.	"The Forever Bag"	2:02
22.	"Recipe for Disaster"	3:01
23.	"The Soul Sever"	2:30
24.	"What Lies Above, Part 1"	5:39
25.	"What Lies Above, Part 2"	6:31
Total length:		113:51

== Cancellation ==
Following the end of the show's first season, ThunderCats was not immediately renewed for a second, which led to speculations that the series would be cancelled. During the 2012 San Diego Comic-Con, Michael Jelenic and Jeff Prezenkowski announced that ThunderCats had been put on hiatus as they had not yet received any word from Cartoon Network about the future of the series. In March 2013, Dan Norton posted that further work on the series is unlikely in the near future. The first season ThunderCats episodes briefly aired in the new Toonami block on Adult Swim along with Sym-Bionic Titan. It was confirmed by ThunderCats art-director Dan Norton in early 2013 that the show had been cancelled after only one season.

=== Post-cancellation info ===
In an interview with Dan Norton, Shannon Eric Denton, and Larry Kenney at Power-Con, they mentioned that if there was a season two, it would detail Mumm-Ra's hand in the creation of the Snarfs, Slithe's history with Lynx-O (which would also explain how Slithe and the Lizards sided with Mumm-Ra), Mumm-Ra tricking the ThunderKittens into bringing the Sword of Omens to him, so that he could send them to El Dara, and Pumyra being transformed into a wicked insectoid monster on a mission to capture the ThunderCats. The name of the final stone was also revealed as the Soul Stone.

Dan Norton later revealed in a 2017 interview that LEGO had been working on a toy line for the 2011 ThunderCats cartoon. When the show was not renewed, LEGO was allowed to retain its prototype toy designs and alter them into an original property, which became LEGO Legends of Chima.
