= ThunderCats (1987 video game) =

ThunderCats: The Lost Eye of Thundera
- Amstrad CPC cover art
- Developer: Elite Systems
- Publisher: Elite Systems
- Composers: Rob Hubbard (C64, ST, ZX); David Whittaker (Amiga, CPC)
- Platforms: Atari ST, Amiga, Amstrad CPC, Commodore 64, ZX Spectrum
- Release: October 1987
- Genre: Action
- Mode: Single-player

ThunderCats: The Lost Eye of Thundera or simply as ThunderCats is a side-scrolling video game that is based on the original animated television series ThunderCats. The game was published in 1987 by Elite Systems Ltd for home computers including the Amstrad CPC, Amiga, Atari ST, Commodore 64 and ZX Spectrum.

== Plot ==
When the game begins, the player is shown an image of Mumm-Ra, the Thundercats' main villain, and is told that Mumm-Ra now has the Eye of Thundera, the source of the Thundercats' power. The player takes control of the character Lion-O and maneuvers him through 14 side-scrolling levels to search for the missing Eye of Thundera.

== Gameplay ==
Screenshot from the Commodore 64 version

Lion-O begins the game equipped with the Sword of Omens (with the Eye of Thundera missing from the hilt) but has the option to switch throughout the game between the sword and a short range energy gun. In several levels, Lion-O would jump into a flying vehicle that can fire in a similar manner as the short range energy gun. The first four levels of the game are a part of the Garden of the Elementals, where the player may choose the order they play each of the themed levels, consisting of fire, water, air, and earth.

Each level has a time limit to complete it; when it expires, Mumm-Ra appears and more goons and villains appear to make it tougher for Lion-O to finish.

Curiously, there aren't any boss fights in the game; instead, completing the regular level just announces Tygra, Panthro, or Wilykit has been rescued (after certain levels) or Mumm-Ra has been defeated and the Eye of Thundera has been restored.

== Development ==
Upon obtaining the ThunderCats license, Elite Systems contracted Paradise Software to develop a game based on it; they also started to develop one internally, in case Paradise could not deliver in time for the announced Christmas release date. As the deadline neared, however, it became clear that neither game would meet it. Elite then acquired a near-finished action game titled Samurai Dawn from Faster Than Light, and modified its graphics to make it a ThunderCats game.

Work on the two other games continued, but Elite had only intended to release one ThunderCats title. Paradise's game had the protagonist changed into Sir Arthur and pitched to Capcom as a sequel to Ghosts 'n Goblins. The idea was rejected because Capcom was already working on Ghouls 'n Ghosts. Thus the game was modified again, and released under an original title, Beyond the Ice Palace. Meanwhile, Elite's in-house title was released as Bomb Jack II, despite being greatly different from the first Bomb Jack game.
