= Tobin Wolf =

American writer

- Born: Theodore Walter Wolf; 21 July 1922; Pittsburgh, Pennsylvania, United States
- Died: 21 June 1999 (aged 76); Honolulu, Hawai'i, United States
- Other name: Ted Wolf
- Occupation: Inventor
- Years active: 1979–1999
- Known for: Creator of ThunderCats
- Spouse(s): Helen Pierce (m. 1941; div. 1955) Edwina Ruegen (m. 1968; div. 1998)
- Children: 1
- Parents: Peter Wolf (father); Elizabeth Wolf (mother)

Theodore Walter Wolf (21 July 1922 – 21 June 1999), better known as Tobin Wolf and Ted Wolf, was an American writer who was known for creating the animated television series ThunderCats. He was also an inventor with several patents to his name, mostly toy- and game-related.

== Biography ==
Wolf was born in Pittsburgh, Pennsylvania, in 1922. His father died when Wolf was a child and he was raised by his grandparents. His grandparents later gave him up to a foster home when he was 10. Eventually, he moved out, putting himself through high school and marrying at 19.

Wolf enlisted to fight in World War II and lost part of his leg in the Battle of the Bulge. After the war, he studied mechanical engineering and worked at Westinghouse, patenting several inventions. Wolf later became primarily involved in the development of toys and board games. He developed a version of the portable record player.

In 1981, Wolf sketched a group of superpowered animals which combined superhuman and superanimal powers. After pitching the idea to several studios, Telepictures agreed to develop the series in 1984, and it became ThunderCats.
