= Thomas Yeates =

American comics artist (born 1955)

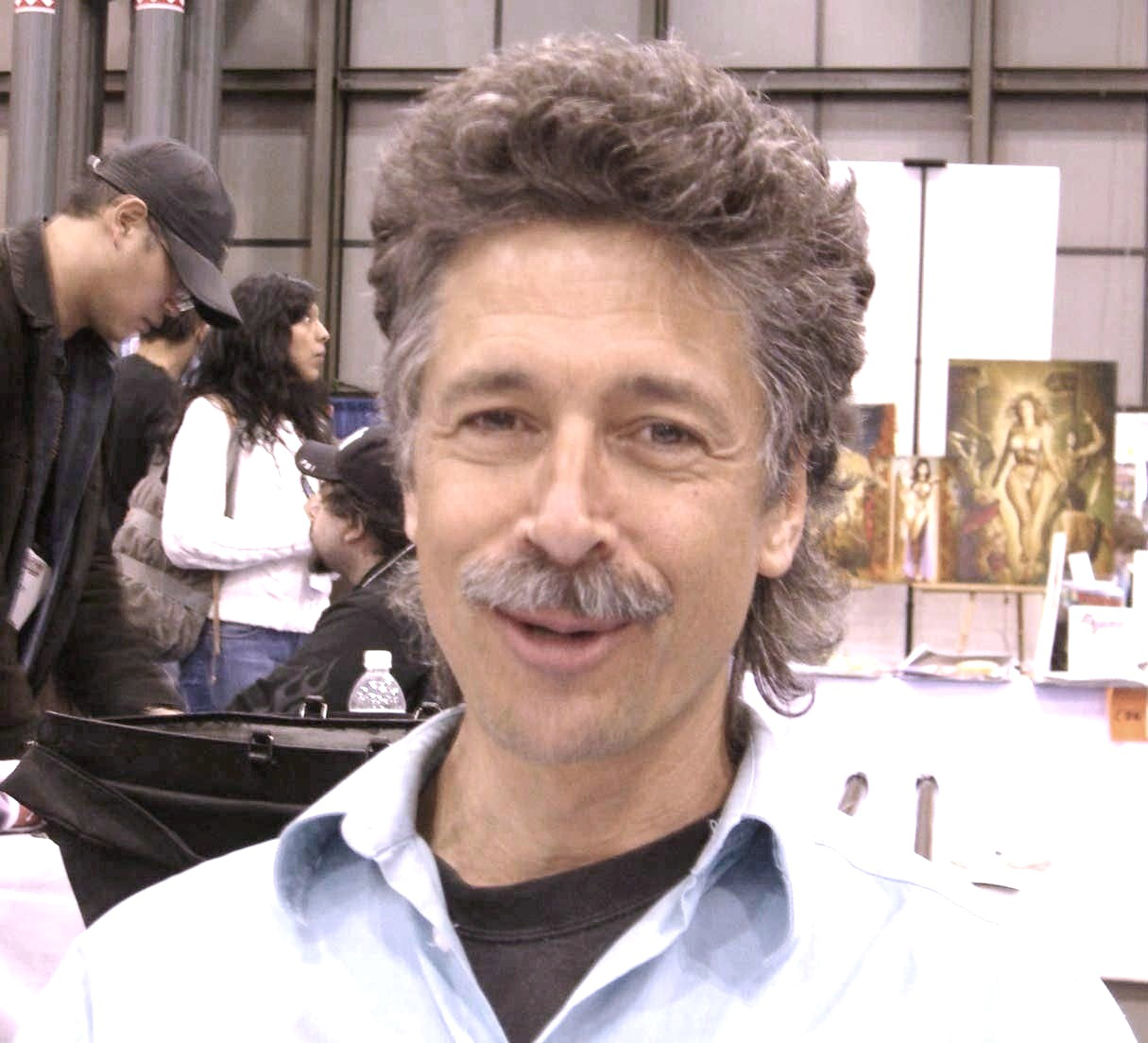
- Thomas Yeates at the 2008 New York Comic Con
- Born: January 19, 1955 (age 71)
- Area: Artist
- Notable works: Conan; Prince Valiant; Tarzan; Zorro
- Awards: Inkpot Award, 2012

Thomas Yeates (born January 19, 1955) is an American comic strip and comic book artist best known for illustrating the comic strips Prince Valiant and Zorro and for working on characters created by Edgar Rice Burroughs.

== Early life ==
Thomas Yeates was born in Sacramento, California and began drawing at a young age. He attended Utah State University for two years.

== Career ==
Yeates was part of the first graduating class from The Kubert School. His first published comics work was "Preacher" a five-page backup feature in Sgt. Rock #312 (Jan. 1978). He provided spot illustrations for a Batman prose story in Detective Comics #500 (March 1981) written by Walter B. Gibson, longtime writer of The Shadow. Yeates and Jack C. Harris briefly revived Claw the Unconquered as a backup feature in The Warlord #48–49. "Dragonsword" was a backup feature by Paul Levitz and Yeates which appeared in The Warlord #51–54 (Nov. 1981–Feb. 1982). In 1982, Yeates and writer Martin Pasko revived Swamp Thing in a new series titled Saga of the Swamp Thing. Timespirits was created by Stephen Perry and Yeates for the Epic Comics line. In 1987, he drew a comics adaptation of Captain EO for Eclipse Comics, with stereoscopy effects by Ray Zone. In 1989, Amazing Heroes named the comic the third best 3D comic of all time, praising Yeates' artwork. Neil Gaiman asked him to draw The Sandman but Yeates declined the offer.

Yeates drew the Universe X: Beasts and Universe X: Cap one-shots for Marvel in 2001. On April 1, 2012, Yeates began drawing the Prince Valiant comic strip, replacing Gary Gianni.

Yeates collaborated with Sergio Aragonés and Mark Evanier on the Groo vs. Conan crossover for Dark Horse Comics in 2014.

== Awards ==
Yeates received an Inkpot Award in 2012.

== Bibliography ==
=== Comico ===
- Jonny Quest #4 (1986)

=== Dark Horse Comics ===
- Conan #1, 3–7, 9–11, 13–14 (2004–2005)
- Dark Horse Presents #143 (1999)
- Dark Horse Presents vol. 2 #8–10 (2012)
- Edgar Rice Burroughs' Tarzan: The Lost Adventure #1 (1995)
- Edgar Rice Burroughs' The Return of Tarzan #1–3 (1997)
- Groo vs. Conan #1–4 (2014)
- Monkeyman and O'Brien July's Greatest Comics #1 (1996)
- Tarzan #1–6, 17–20 (1996–1998)

=== DC Comics ===
- Arak, Son of Thunder #27–30 (1983–1984)
- Detective Comics #500 (Batman) (1981)
- Elvira's House of Mystery #7 (1986)
- Ghosts #67,89 (1978-1980)
- House of Mystery #294, 301, 315 (1981–1983)
- Jonah Hex #53–55 (1981)
- Mystery in Space #114, 117 (1980–1981)
- Saga of the Swamp Thing #1–8, 10–13 (1982–1983)
- Sgt. Rock #312, 331, 340, 346 (1978–1980)
- Superman #422 (1986)
- Swamp Thing #64, 86–89, 112–113, Annual #3 (1987–1991)
- Unknown Soldier #244–246 (1980)
- Vertigo Visions – Tomahawk #1 (1998)
- The Warlord #48–49 (Claw the Unconquered); #51–54 (Dragonsword) (1981–1982)
- Weird War Tales #103 (1981)
- Who's Who: The Definitive Directory of the DC Universe #26 (1987)

=== Eclipse Comics ===
- Airboy #1–2, 25 (1986–1987)
- Alien Encounters #8 (1986)
- Alien Worlds vol. 2 #1 (1988)
- Aztec Ace #10, 14 (1985)
- Brought to Light #1 (1988)
- Captain EO #1 (adaptation) (1987)
- Licence to Kill #1 (adaptation) (1989)
- Luger #1–3 (1986–1987)
- The New DNAgents #10 (1986)
- Orbit #3 (1990)
- Real War Stories #1 (1987)
- Scout #7, 9 (1986)
- Scout Handbook #1 (1987)
- Scout: War Shaman #10–11 (1989)
- Total Eclipse #2, 4 (1988–1989)

=== HM Communications, Inc. ===
- Heavy Metal #v4#7, #v5#5, #v7#10 (1980–1984)

=== Image Comics ===
- Zorro: The Dailies, First Year #1 (2001)

=== Malibu Comics ===
- Tarzan: The Beckoning #1–7 (1992–1993)

=== Marvel Comics ===
- Paradise X: Ragnarok #1–2 (2003)
- Timespirits #1–8 (1984–1986)
- Universe X: Beasts #1 (2001)
- Universe X: Cap #1 (2001)
- Wild Cards #2 (1990)

=== Pacific Comics ===
- Alien Worlds #3, 5 (1983)

=== Topps Comics ===
- Dracula Versus Zorro #1–2 (1993)

Preceded by n/a	The Saga of the Swamp Thing artist 1982–1983	Succeeded by Bo Hampton
Preceded by Ron Randall	Arak, Son of Thunder inker 1983–1984	Succeeded by Ernie Colón
Preceded by Gary Gianni	Prince Valiant artist 2012–present	Succeeded by n/a
