= List of Groo the Wanderer stories =

The following is a list of titles featuring the comics character Groo the Wanderer.

== Albums ==
PUBLICATION	DATE	ISSUE	STORY TITLE
GROO THE WANDERER v.1 (Pacific Comics)	Dec/1982	#1	Friends and Enemies
GROO THE WANDERER v.1 (Pacific Comics)	Feb/1983	#2	The Missive!
GROO THE WANDERER v.1 (Pacific Comics)	Apr/1983	#3	The Caravan
GROO THE WANDERER v.1 (Pacific Comics)	Sep/1983	#4	The Turn of the Wheel!
GROO THE WANDERER v.1 (Pacific Comics)	Oct/1983	#5	Shanghaied!
GROO THE WANDERER v.1 (Pacific Comics)	Dec/1983	#6	The Wizard War
GROO THE WANDERER v.1 (Pacific Comics)	Feb/1984	#7	Chakaal!
GROO THE WANDERER v.1 (Pacific Comics)	Apr/1984	#8	Warriors Two
GROO SPECIAL No.1 (Eclipse Comics)	Oct/1984	#1	The Swords of Groo; Music of Murkos (1977); 4 pages of cut-out Groo paper-doll characters; first untitled Groo story (republished from Destroyer Duck Vol.1 No.1)
SERGIO ARAGONES' GROO THE WANDERER (v.2) (Epic Comics)	Mar/1985	#1	The Song of Groo
SERGIO ARAGONES' GROO THE WANDERER (v.2) (Epic Comics)	Apr/1985	#2	Dragon Killer
SERGIO ARAGONES' GROO THE WANDERER (v.2) (Epic Comics)	May/1985	#3	The Medallion
SERGIO ARAGONES' GROO THE WANDERER (v.2) (Epic Comics)	Jun/1985	#4	World Without Women
SERGIO ARAGONES' GROO THE WANDERER (v.2) (Epic Comics)	Jul/1985	#5	Slavers
SERGIO ARAGONES' GROO THE WANDERER (v.2) (Epic Comics)	Aug/1985	#6	Eye of the Kubula
SERGIO ARAGONES' GROO THE WANDERER (v.2) (Epic Comics)	Sep/1985	#7	The Ivory Graveyard
SERGIO ARAGONES' GROO THE WANDERER (v.2) (Epic Comics)	Oct/1985	#8	The Treasure of Kantor
SERGIO ARAGONES' GROO THE WANDERER (v.2) (Epic Comics)	Nov/1985	#9	Pigs and Apples
SERGIO ARAGONES' GROO THE WANDERER (v.2) (Epic Comics)	Dec/1985	#10	Groo Meets the Hero
SERGIO ARAGONES' GROO THE WANDERER (v.2) (Epic Comics)	Jan/1986	#11	A Hero's Task
SERGIO ARAGONES' GROO THE WANDERER (v.2) (Epic Comics)	Feb/1986	#12	Groo Meets the Thespians
SERGIO ARAGONES' GROO THE WANDERER (v.2) (Epic Comics)	Mar/1986	#13	Groo and the Tale of King Sage
SERGIO ARAGONES' GROO THE WANDERER (v.2) (Epic Comics)	Apr/1986	#14	The Quarry
SERGIO ARAGONES' GROO THE WANDERER (v.2) (Epic Comics)	May/1986	#15	Groo and the Monks
SERGIO ARAGONES' GROO THE WANDERER (v.2) (Epic Comics)	Jun/1986	#16	Groo and the Shipyard
SERGIO ARAGONES' GROO THE WANDERER (v.2) (Epic Comics)	Jul/1986	#17	Pescatel (The Hatchery)
SERGIO ARAGONES' GROO THE WANDERER (v.2) (Epic Comics)	Aug/1986	#18	Sister's City
SERGIO ARAGONES' GROO THE WANDERER (v.2) (Epic Comics)	Sep/1986	#19	Groo and the Siege
SERGIO ARAGONES' GROO THE WANDERER (v.2) (Epic Comics)	Oct/1986	#20	Groo and the Siege (second try)
SERGIO ARAGONES' GROO THE WANDERER (v.2) (Epic Comics)	Nov/1986	#21	Groo and the Witches of Brujas
SERGIO ARAGONES' GROO THE WANDERER (v.2) (Epic Comics)	Dec/1986	#22	Groo and the Ambassador
SERGIO ARAGONES' GROO THE WANDERER (v.2) (Epic Comics)	Jan/1987	#23	Groo Meets Pal and Drumm
SERGIO ARAGONES' GROO THE WANDERER (v.2) (Epic Comics)	Feb/1987	#24	Arcadio's Quest
SERGIO ARAGONES' GROO THE WANDERER (v.2) (Epic Comics)	Mar/1987	#25	Divide and Conquer
SERGIO ARAGONES' GROO THE WANDERER (v.2) (Epic Comics)	Apr/1987	#26	Arba and Dakarba
SERGIO ARAGONES' GROO THE WANDERER (v.2) (Epic Comics)	May/1987	#27	Spies!
SERGIO ARAGONES' GROO THE WANDERER (v.2) (Epic Comics)	Jun/1987	#28	The Gourmet Kings
SERGIO ARAGONES' GROO THE WANDERER (v.2) (Epic Comics)	Jul/1987	#29	Rufferto
SERGIO ARAGONES' GROO THE WANDERER (v.2) (Epic Comics)	Aug/1987	#30	Rufferto II
SERGIO ARAGONES' GROO THE WANDERER (v.2) (Epic Comics)	Sep/1987	#31	The Arms Deal
SERGIO ARAGONES' GROO THE WANDERER (v.2) (Epic Comics)	Oct/1987	#32	The Bankers of Avara
SERGIO ARAGONES' GROO THE WANDERER (v.2) (Epic Comics)	Nov/1987	#33	The Pirates of Salgari
SERGIO ARAGONES' GROO THE WANDERER (v.2) (Epic Comics)	Dec/1987	#34	The Amulet
SERGIO ARAGONES' GROO THE WANDERER (v.2) (Epic Comics)	Jan/1988	#35	Wishes
SERGIO ARAGONES' GROO THE WANDERER (v.2) (Epic Comics)	Feb/1988	#36	Rhyme Nor Reason
SERGIO ARAGONES' GROO THE WANDERER (v.2) (Epic Comics)	Mar/1988	#37	The Village of Miggledy
SERGIO ARAGONES' GROO THE WANDERER (v.2) (Epic Comics)	Apr/1988	#38	Mealtime
SERGIO ARAGONES' GROO THE WANDERER (v.2) (Epic Comics)	May/1988	#39	A Groo's Best Friend
SERGIO ARAGONES' GROO THE WANDERER (v.2) (Epic Comics)	Jun/1988	#40	The Glass Carafe
SERGIO ARAGONES' GROO THE WANDERER (v.2) (Epic Comics)	Jul/1988	#41	Granny Groo
SERGIO ARAGONES' GROO THE WANDERER (v.2) (Epic Comics)	Aug/1988	#42	The Wedding of Groo
SERGIO ARAGONES' GROO THE WANDERER (v.2) (Epic Comics)	Sep/1988	#43	Slave!
SERGIO ARAGONES' GROO THE WANDERER (v.2) (Epic Comics)	Oct/1988	#44	Rufferto Reverie
SERGIO ARAGONES' GROO THE WANDERER (v.2) (Epic Comics)	Nov/1988	#45	Rufferto Reality
SERGIO ARAGONES' GROO THE WANDERER (v.2) (Epic Comics)	Dec/1988	#46	Groo's Clothes
SERGIO ARAGONES' GROO THE WANDERER (v.2) (Epic Comics)	Jan/1989	#47	The 300% Solution
SERGIO ARAGONES' GROO THE WANDERER (v.2) (Epic Comics)	Feb/1989	#48	The Wanderer!
SERGIO ARAGONES' GROO THE WANDERER (v.2) (Epic Comics)	Mar 1989	#49	The Protector
SERGIO ARAGONES' GROO THE WANDERER (v.2) (Epic Comics)	Apr/1989	#50	Chakaal Again!
SERGIO ARAGONES' GROO THE WANDERER (v.2) (Epic Comics)	May/1989	#51	The Valley of Mas and Menos
SERGIO ARAGONES' GROO THE WANDERER (v.2) (Epic Comics)	Jun/1989	#52	The Arana
SERGIO ARAGONES' GROO THE WANDERER (v.2) (Epic Comics)	Jul/1989	#53	Dragons for Sale
SERGIO ARAGONES' GROO THE WANDERER (v.2) (Epic Comics)	Aug/1989	#54	The Armadas
SERGIO ARAGONES' GROO THE WANDERER (v.2) (Epic Comics)	Sep/1989	#55	The Island of Felicidad
SERGIO ARAGONES' GROO THE WANDERER (v.2) (Epic Comics)	Oct/1989	#56	A Minstrel's Tale
SERGIO ARAGONES' GROO THE WANDERER (v.2) (Epic Comics)	Nov/1989	#57	The Captain of Chinampa
SERGIO ARAGONES' GROO THE WANDERER (v.2) (Epic Comics)	Mid-Nov/1989	#58	The Idol
SERGIO ARAGONES' GROO THE WANDERER (v.2) (Epic Comics)	Dec/1989	#59	One Fine Day
SERGIO ARAGONES' GROO THE WANDERER (v.2) (Epic Comics)	Mid-Dec/1989	#60	The Mendicants
SERGIO ARAGONES' GROO THE WANDERER (v.2) (Epic Comics)	Jan/1990	#61	The Horses of Caballo
SERGIO ARAGONES' GROO THE WANDERER (v.2) (Epic Comics)	Feb/1990	#62	Horse Sense
SERGIO ARAGONES' GROO THE WANDERER (v.2) (Epic Comics)	Mar/1990	#63	Real Estate
SERGIO ARAGONES' GROO THE WANDERER (v.2) (Epic Comics)	Apr/1990	#64	The Painter
SERGIO ARAGONES' GROO THE WANDERER (v.2) (Epic Comics)	May/1990	#65	The Garbage Issue
SERGIO ARAGONES' GROO THE WANDERER (v.2) (Epic Comics)	Jun/1990	#66	The Gurus
SERGIO ARAGONES' GROO THE WANDERER (v.2) (Epic Comics)	Jul/1990	#67	Dragon Quest
SERGIO ARAGONES' GROO THE WANDERER (v.2) (Epic Comics)	Aug/1990	#68	The Hero of Lerolero
SERGIO ARAGONES' GROO THE WANDERER (v.2) (Epic Comics)	Sep/1990	#69	One if by Land, Two if by Sea
SERGIO ARAGONES' GROO THE WANDERER (v.2) (Epic Comics)	Oct/1990	#70	The Greatest Hero
SERGIO ARAGONES' GROO THE WANDERER (v.2) (Epic Comics)	Nov/1990	#71	Laughingstock
SERGIO ARAGONES' GROO THE WANDERER (v.2) (Epic Comics)	Dec/1990	#72	The Shaman
SERGIO ARAGONES' GROO THE WANDERER (v.2) (Epic Comics)	Jan/1991	#73	The Scepter of King Cetro (part 1)
SERGIO ARAGONES' GROO THE WANDERER (v.2) (Epic Comics)	Feb/1991	#74	The Scepter of King Cetro (part 2)
SERGIO ARAGONES' GROO THE WANDERER (v.2) (Epic Comics)	Mar/1991	#75	The Scepter of King Cetro (part 3)
SERGIO ARAGONES' GROO THE WANDERER (v.2) (Epic Comics)	Apr/1991	#76	The Mines of Minas
SERGIO ARAGONES' GROO THE WANDERER (v.2) (Epic Comics)	May/1991	#77	Rufferto's Magic Wish
SERGIO ARAGONES' GROO THE WANDERER (v.2) (Epic Comics)	Jun/1991	#78	The Book Burners
SERGIO ARAGONES' GROO THE WANDERER (v.2) (Epic Comics)	Jul/1991	#79	The Monks of Monjes
SERGIO ARAGONES' GROO THE WANDERER (v.2) (Epic Comics)	Aug/1991	#80	Princess Thaiis (part 1)
SERGIO ARAGONES' GROO THE WANDERER (v.2) (Epic Comics)	Sep/1991	#81	Princess Thaiis (part 2)
SERGIO ARAGONES' GROO THE WANDERER (v.2) (Epic Comics)	Oct/1991	#82	Princess Thaiis (part 3)
SERGIO ARAGONES' GROO THE WANDERER (v.2) (Epic Comics)	Nov/1991	#83	Princess Thaiis (part 4)
SERGIO ARAGONES' GROO THE WANDERER (v.2) (Epic Comics)	Dec/1991	#84	The Puppeteers
SERGIO ARAGONES' GROO THE WANDERER (v.2) (Epic Comics)	Jan/1992	#85	Out of Sight, Out of Mind
SERGIO ARAGONES' GROO THE WANDERER (v.2) (Epic Comics)	Feb/1992	#86	The Two Doors
SERGIO ARAGONES' GROO THE WANDERER (v.2) (Epic Comics)	Mar/1992	#87	The Supreme General
SERGIO ARAGONES' GROO THE WANDERER (v.2) (Epic Comics)	Apr/1992	#88	Prairie War
SERGIO ARAGONES' GROO THE WANDERER (v.2) (Epic Comics)	May/1992	#89	The Cult
SERGIO ARAGONES' GROO THE WANDERER (v.2) (Epic Comics)	Jun/1992	#90	The Lawyer
SERGIO ARAGONES' GROO THE WANDERER (v.2) (Epic Comics)	Jul/1992	#91	Odoman the Invincible
SERGIO ARAGONES' GROO THE WANDERER (v.2) (Epic Comics)	Aug/1992	#92	The Fountain of Youth (part 1)
SERGIO ARAGONES' GROO THE WANDERER (v.2) (Epic Comics)	Sep/1992	#93	The Fountain of Youth (part 2)
SERGIO ARAGONES' GROO THE WANDERER (v.2) (Epic Comics)	Oct/1992	#94	Water
SERGIO ARAGONES' GROO THE WANDERER (v.2) (Epic Comics)	Nov/1992	#95	The Menagerie
SERGIO ARAGONES' GROO THE WANDERER (v.2) (Epic Comics)	Dec/1992	#96	The Wager of the Gods (part 1)
SERGIO ARAGONES' GROO THE WANDERER (v.2) (Epic Comics)	Jan/1993	#97	The Wager of the Gods (part 2)
SERGIO ARAGONES' GROO THE WANDERER (v.2) (Epic Comics)	Feb/1993	#98	The Wager of the Gods (part 3)
SERGIO ARAGONES' GROO THE WANDERER (v.2) (Epic Comics)	Mar/1993	#99	The Wager of the Gods (part 4)
SERGIO ARAGONES' GROO THE WANDERER (v.2) (Epic Comics)	Apr/1993	#100	A Little Knowledge
SERGIO ARAGONES' GROO THE WANDERER (v.2) (Epic Comics)	May/1993	#101	A New Land
SERGIO ARAGONES' GROO THE WANDERER (v.2) (Epic Comics)	Jun/1993	#102	A Bridge Named Groo
SERGIO ARAGONES' GROO THE WANDERER (v.2) (Epic Comics)	Aug/1993	#103	Jailbirds
SERGIO ARAGONES' GROO THE WANDERER (v.2) (Epic Comics)	Sep/1993	#104	A Home for Oso
SERGIO ARAGONES' GROO THE WANDERER (v.2) (Epic Comics)	Oct/1993	#105	The Curse of Criatures
SERGIO ARAGONES' GROO THE WANDERER (v.2) (Epic Comics)	Nov/1993	#106	Man of the People (part 1)
SERGIO ARAGONES' GROO THE WANDERER (v.2) (Epic Comics)	Dec/1993	#107	Man of the People (part 2)
SERGIO ARAGONES' GROO THE WANDERER (v.2) (Epic Comics)	Jan/1994	#108	Man of the People (part 3)
SERGIO ARAGONES' GROO THE WANDERER (v.2) (Epic Comics)	Feb/1994	#109	Man of the People (part 4)
SERGIO ARAGONES' GROO THE WANDERER (v.2) (Epic Comics)	Mar/1994	#110	Creature of the Night
SERGIO ARAGONES' GROO THE WANDERER (v.2) (Epic Comics)	April/1994	#111	The Man Who Killed Groo
SERGIO ARAGONES' GROO THE WANDERER (v.2) (Epic Comics)	May/1994	#112	Rufferto Avenged
SERGIO ARAGONES' GROO THE WANDERER (v.2) (Epic Comics)	Jun/1994	#113	Three Wishes for Groo
SERGIO ARAGONES' GROO THE WANDERER (v.2) (Epic Comics)	Jul/1994	#114	The Birds of Vultura (part 1)
SERGIO ARAGONES' GROO THE WANDERER (v.2) (Epic Comics)	Aug/1994	#115	The Birds of Vultura (part 2)
SERGIO ARAGONES' GROO THE WANDERER (v.2) (Epic Comics)	Sep/1994	#116	Early Uno Morning
SERGIO ARAGONES' GROO THE WANDERER (v.2) (Epic Comics)	Oct/1994	#117	Macha
SERGIO ARAGONES' GROO THE WANDERER (v.2) (Epic Comics)	Nov/1994	#118	Day of the Pig (part 1)
SERGIO ARAGONES' GROO THE WANDERER (v.2) (Epic Comics)	Dec/1994	#119	Day of the Pig (part 2)
SERGIO ARAGONES' GROO THE WANDERER (v.2) (Epic Comics)	Jan/1995	#120	The Final Battle
SERGIO ARAGONES' GROO (v.3) (Image Comics)	Dec/1994	#1	The Promised Land
SERGIO ARAGONES' GROO (v.3) (Image Comics)	Jan/1995	#2	The Aquelarre
SERGIO ARAGONES' GROO (v.3) (Image Comics)	Feb/1995	#3	The General's Hat
SERGIO ARAGONES' GROO (v.3) (Image Comics)	Mar/1995	#4	A Drink of Water
SERGIO ARAGONES' GROO (v.3) (Image Comics)	Apr/1995	#5	A Little War
SERGIO ARAGONES' GROO (v.3) (Image Comics)	May/1995	#6	The Great Invention
SERGIO ARAGONES' GROO (v.3) (Image Comics)	Jun/1995	#7	The plight of the Drazils
SERGIO ARAGONES' GROO (v.3) (Image Comics)	Jul/1995	#8	Pipil Khan
SERGIO ARAGONES' GROO (v.3) (Image Comics)	Aug/1995	#9	Arfetto
SERGIO ARAGONES' GROO (v.3) (Image Comics)	Sep/1995	#10	The Sinkers
SERGIO ARAGONES' GROO (v.3) (Image Comics)	Oct/1995	#11	The Gamblers
SERGIO ARAGONES' GROO (v.3) (Image Comics)	Nov/1995	#12	The Revenge of Pipil Khan
SERGIO ARAGONES' GROO (v.4) (Dark Horse Comics)	Jan/1998	#1	The Most Intelligent Man in the World (part 1)
SERGIO ARAGONES' GROO (v.4) (Dark Horse Comics)	Feb/1998	#2	The Most Intelligent Man in the World (part 2)
SERGIO ARAGONES' GROO (v.4) (Dark Horse Comics)	Mar/1998	#3	The Most Intelligent Man in the World (part 3)
SERGIO ARAGONES' GROO (v.4) (Dark Horse Comics)	Apr/1998	#4	The Most Intelligent Man in the World (part 4)
SERGIO ARAGONES' GROO (v.4) (Dark Horse Comics)	Dec/1998	#5	Groo and Rufferto (part 1)
SERGIO ARAGONES' GROO (v.4) (Dark Horse Comics)	Jan/1999	#6	Groo and Rufferto (part 2)
SERGIO ARAGONES' GROO (v.4) (Dark Horse Comics)	Feb/1999	#7	Groo and Rufferto (part 3)
SERGIO ARAGONES' GROO (v.4) (Dark Horse Comics)	Mar/1999	#8	Groo and Rufferto (part 4)
SERGIO ARAGONES' GROO (v.4) (Dark Horse Comics)	Jan/2000	#9	Mightier than the Sword (part 1)
SERGIO ARAGONES' GROO (v.4) (Dark Horse Comics)	Feb/2000	#10	Mightier than the Sword (part 2)
SERGIO ARAGONES' GROO (v.4) (Dark Horse Comics)	Mar/2000	#11	Mightier than the Sword (part 3)
SERGIO ARAGONES' GROO (v.4) (Dark Horse Comics)	Apr/2000	#12	Mightier than the Sword (part 4)
SERGIO ARAGONES' GROO (v.4) (Dark Horse Comics)	Dec/2001	#13	Death and Taxes (part 1)
SERGIO ARAGONES' GROO (v.4) (Dark Horse Comics)	Jan/2002	#14	Death and Taxes (part 2)
SERGIO ARAGONES' GROO (v.4) (Dark Horse Comics)	Feb/2002	#15	Death and Taxes (part 3)
SERGIO ARAGONES' GROO (v.4) (Dark Horse Comics)	Mar/2002	#16	Death and Taxes (part 4)
SERGIO ARAGONES' GROO (v.4) (Dark Horse Comics)	Sep/2007	#17	Hell on Earth (part 1)
SERGIO ARAGONES' GROO (v.4) (Dark Horse Comics)	Oct/2007	#18	Hell on Earth (part 2)
SERGIO ARAGONES' GROO (v.4) (Dark Horse Comics)	Nov/2007	#19	Hell on Earth (part 3)
SERGIO ARAGONES' GROO (v.4) (Dark Horse Comics)	Dec/2007	#20	Hell on Earth (part 4)
SERGIO ARAGONES' GROO (v.4) (Dark Horse Comics)	Oct/2009	#21	The Hogs of Horder (part 1)
SERGIO ARAGONES' GROO (v.4) (Dark Horse Comics)	Dec/2009	#22	The Hogs of Horder (part 2)
SERGIO ARAGONES' GROO (v.4) (Dark Horse Comics)	Feb/2010	#23	The Hogs of Horder (part 3)
SERGIO ARAGONES' GROO (v.4) (Dark Horse Comics)	Mar/2010	#24	The Hogs of Horder (part 4)
SERGIO ARAGONES' GROO (v.4) (Dark Horse Comics)	Jan/2015	#25	Friends and Foes (part 1 – Captain Ahax)
SERGIO ARAGONES' GROO (v.4) (Dark Horse Comics)	Feb/2015	#26	Friends and Foes (part 2 – Granny Groo)
SERGIO ARAGONES' GROO (v.4) (Dark Horse Comics)	Mar/2015	#27	Friends and Foes (part 3 – Arba and Dakarba)
SERGIO ARAGONES' GROO (v.4) (Dark Horse Comics)	Apr/2015	#28	Friends and Foes (part 4 – Arcadio)
SERGIO ARAGONES' GROO (v.4) (Dark Horse Comics)	May/2015	#29	Friends and Foes (part 5 – Grooella)
SERGIO ARAGONES' GROO (v.4) (Dark Horse Comics)	Jun/2015	#30	Friends and Foes (part 6 – The Sage)
SERGIO ARAGONES' GROO (v.4) (Dark Horse Comics)	Jul/2015	#31	Friends and Foes (part 7 – Chakaal)
SERGIO ARAGONES' GROO (v.4) (Dark Horse Comics)	Aug/2015	#32	Friends and Foes (part 8 – Weaver and Scribe)
SERGIO ARAGONES' GROO (v.4) (Dark Horse Comics)	Sep/2015	#33	Friends and Foes (part 9 – Pal ’n’ Drumm)
SERGIO ARAGONES' GROO (v.4) (Dark Horse Comics)	Oct/2015	#34	Friends and Foes (part 10 – Taranto)
SERGIO ARAGONES' GROO (v.4) (Dark Horse Comics)	Nov/2015	#35	Friends and Foes (part 11 – The Minstrel)
SERGIO ARAGONES' GROO (v.4) (Dark Horse Comics)	Dec/2015	#36	Friends and Foes (part 12 – Kayli)
SERGIO ARAGONES' GROO (v.4) (Dark Horse Comics)	Jul/2016	#37	Fray of the Gods (part 1)
SERGIO ARAGONES' GROO (v.4) (Dark Horse Comics)	Aug/2016	#38	Fray of the Gods (part 2)
SERGIO ARAGONES' GROO (v.4) (Dark Horse Comics)	Sept/2016	#39	Fray of the Gods (part 3)
SERGIO ARAGONES' GROO (v.4) (Dark Horse Comics)	Aug/2016	#40	Fray of the Gods (part 4)
SERGIO ARAGONES' GROO (v.4) (Dark Horse Comics)	Jul/2017	#41	Play of the Gods (part 1)
SERGIO ARAGONES' GROO (v.4) (Dark Horse Comics)	Aug/2017	#42	Play of the Gods (part 2)
SERGIO ARAGONES' GROO (v.4) (Dark Horse Comics)	Sept/2017	#43	Play of the Gods (part 3)
SERGIO ARAGONES' GROO (v.4) (Dark Horse Comics)	Oct/2017	#44	Play of the Gods (part 4)
SERGIO ARAGONES' GROO (v.4) (Dark Horse Comics)	Dec/2022	#45	Gods Against Groo (part 1)
SERGIO ARAGONES' GROO (v.4) (Dark Horse Comics)	Jan/2023	#46	Gods Against Groo (part 2)
SERGIO ARAGONES' GROO (v.4) (Dark Horse Comics)	Feb/2023	#47	Gods Against Groo (part 3)
SERGIO ARAGONES' GROO (v.4) (Dark Horse Comics)	Mar/2023	#48	Gods Against Groo (part 4)
SERGIO ARAGONES' GROO (v.4) (Dark Horse Comics)	Jul/2023	#49	Groo in the Wild (part 1)
SERGIO ARAGONES' GROO (v.4) (Dark Horse Comics)	Aug/2023	#50	Groo in the Wild (part 2)
SERGIO ARAGONES' GROO (v.4) (Dark Horse Comics)	Oct/2023	#51	Groo in the Wild (part 3)
SERGIO ARAGONES' GROO (v.4) (Dark Horse Comics)	Nov/2023	#52	Groo in the Wild (part 4)
SERGIO ARAGONES' GROO (v.4) (Dark Horse Comics)	Sep/2024	#53	Ministrel Melodies (part 1)
SERGIO ARAGONES' GROO (v.4) (Dark Horse Comics)	Oct/2024	#54	Ministrel Melodies (part 2)
SERGIO ARAGONES' GROO (v.4) (Dark Horse Comics)	Nov/2024	#55	Ministrel Melodies (part 3)
SERGIO ARAGONES' GROO (v.4) (Dark Horse Comics)	Dec/2024	#56	Ministrel Melodies (part 4)
SERGIO ARAGONES' GROO (v.4) (Dark Horse Comics)	Apr/2026	#57	The Prophecy (part 1)
SERGIO ARAGONES' GROO (v.4) (Dark Horse Comics)	Jun/2026	#58	The Prophecy (part 2)
SERGIO ARAGONES' GROO (v.4) (Dark Horse Comics)	Aug/2026	#59	The Prophecy (part 3)
SERGIO ARAGONES' GROO (v.4) (Dark Horse Comics)	Nov/2026	#60	The Prophecy (part 4)
GROO 25TH ANNIVERSARY SPECIAL (Dark Horse Comics)	Sep/2007	n/a	The Plague; Groo for Sale (reprinted in color)

== Short stories ==
PUBLICATION	DATE	ISSUE	STORY TITLE
DESTROYER DUCK (Eclipse Comics)	Feb/1982	#1	Groo the Wanderer (first untitled story)
STARSLAYER: THE LOG OF THE JOLLY ROGER (Pacific Comics)	Nov/1982	#5	Groo the Wanderer (second untitled story)
EPIC ILLUSTRATED (Marvel Comics)	Dec/1984	#27	Groo the Wanderer (third untitled story)
THE GROO CHRONICLES (Epic Comics)	1989	#5	Groo and the Poachers
THE MASK: VIRTUAL SURREALITY (Dark Horse Comics)	Jul/1997	#1	The Age of Barbarians (Groo cameo appearance)
WIZARD (Wizard Press)	Feb/1998	#78	Groo and the Glut
DARK HORSE PRESENTS ANNUAL 1999 (Dark Horse Comics)	Aug/1999	nn	Groo for Sale (first original black and white story)
DARK HORSE EXTRA (Dark Horse Comics)	Dec/2001	#42	Sergio Aragones' Groo (fourth untitled story)
DARK HORSE PRESENTS (v.3) (Dark Horse Comics)	Feb/2015	#7	The Kids Who Would Be Kings (part 1)
DARK HORSE PRESENTS (v.3) (Dark Horse Comics)	Mar/2015	#8	The Kids Who Would Be Kings (part 2)
DARK HORSE PRESENTS (v.3) (Dark Horse Comics)	Apr/2015	#9	The Kids Who Would Be Kings (part 3)

== Original graphic novels ==
PUBLICATION	DATE	ISSUE	STORY TITLE
THE DEATH OF GROO (Epic Comics)	1987	nn	The Death of Groo
THE LIFE OF GROO (Epic Comics)	1993	nn	The Life of Groo

== Crossover stories ==
PUBLICATION	DATE	ISSUE	STORY TITLE
GROO VS. CONAN with Tom Yeates (Dark Horse Comics)	Jul/2014	#1	Groo vs. Conan (part 1)
GROO VS. CONAN with Tom Yeates (Dark Horse Comics)	Aug/2014	#2	Groo vs. (Conan part 2)
GROO VS. CONAN with Tom Yeates (Dark Horse Comics)	Sep/2014	#3	Groo vs. Conan (part 3)
GROO VS. CONAN with Tom Yeates (Dark Horse Comics)	Oct/2014	#4	Groo vs. Conan (part 4)

PUBLICATION	DATE	ISSUE	STORY TITLE
GROO MEETS TARZAN with Tom Yeates (Dark Horse Comics)	Jul/2021	#1	Groo Meets Tarzan (part 1)
GROO MEETS TARZAN with Tom Yeates (Dark Horse Comics)	Sep/2021	#2	Groo Meets Tarzan (part 2)
GROO MEETS TARZAN with Tom Yeates (Dark Horse Comics)	Sep/2021	#3	Groo Meets Tarzan (part 3)
GROO MEETS TARZAN with Tom Yeates (Dark Horse Comics)	Nov/2021	#4	Groo Meets Tarzan (part 4)
