= The Hidden Shrine of Tamoachan =

Dungeons & Dragons adventure module

- The cover of The Hidden Shrine of Tamoachan, with art by Erol Otus. The artwork depicts a creature battling a group of adventurers.
- Code: C1
- TSR product code: 9032
- Rules required: AD&D
- Character levels: 5 - 7
- Campaign setting: Greyhawk / Generic AD&D
- Authors: Harold Johnson; Jeff R. Leason
- First published: 1980

Linked modules
- C1, C2, C3, C4, C5

The Hidden Shrine of Tamoachan is an adventure module for the Dungeons & Dragons (D&D) fantasy role-playing game, set in the World of Greyhawk campaign setting for use with the 1st edition Advanced Dungeons & Dragons rules. It is the first in the C-series of modules, a set of unrelated adventures originally designed for competitive play, with the C representing the first letter in the word competition. It is the first D&D adventure to use boxed, "read aloud" text.

Originally printed for the 1979 Origins International Game Expo, the module was made available to the general public in 1980. The Hidden Shrine of Tamoachan received generally positive reviews from critics and was ranked the 18th greatest Dungeons & Dragons adventure of all time by Dungeon magazine in 2004.

== Plot summary ==
The player characters explore a stepped pyramid deep in the heart of a tropical jungle—the Hidden Shrine of Tamoachan. The characters must penetrate this Mayan-style temple, which is full of tricks and traps. Some of the traps include cursed items, firebombs, and triggered statues.

The shrine is an ancient pyramid in the style of the Mayas and Aztecs, and the names, creatures, and characters in the adventure are also based on that time period. The adventure contains a booklet including fifteen illustrations of the shrine intended to be shown to the players when they arrive at the corresponding areas. Three pre-generated characters are also included which are designed to be used with the scoring system.

== Publication history ==
This module was originally used for the Official Advanced Dungeons & Dragons tournament at the 1979 Origins International Game Expo (Origins '79). The original printing consisted of forty loose-leaf pages in a zipper storage bag, with a light blue cover; only three hundred copies were printed to be sold at Origins '79. In addition to the adventure itself, the module contains a scoring system and pre-rolled characters for adventuring. The original Origins pre-publication version did not have a module code and was titled Lost Tamoachan: The Hidden Shrine of Lubaatum. After Origins '79, unsold copies were put up for sale at the Dungeon Shoppe in Lake Geneva, Wisconsin. Surviving examples of this version are rare and prized by collectors.

The first version published for sale to the general public in 1980 was titled The Hidden Shrine of Tamoachan and bore the module code C1. This book was written by Harold Johnson and Jeff R. Leason, was printed as a 32-page book and an eight-page book with an outer-folder and a two-color cover illustrated by Erol Otus, and featured illustrations by Otus and Darlene Pekul. The 1981 version consisted of a forty-page booklet with an outer folder and a color cover. The 1980 version featured a monochrome cover of a fire-breathing bat-monster, while the 1981 printing had a dark brown full color cover with cover art of a green giant. A separate booklet of artwork was included in the module, containing illustrations depicting what the player characters would see as part of specific encounters, including work by Otus, Jeff Dee, Greg Fleming, David S. LaForce and David C. Sutherland III.

The module was the first to introduce players to the Olman culture of the World of Greyhawk, a society loosely based on Aztec, Mayan, and other sources. Most unusual for Greyhawk modules, the adventure therefore references Aztec gods such as Quetzalcoatl and others. The adventure itself takes place in the Amedio Jungle at a disused temple near the ruined city of Tamoachan.

In the 2006, 3rd Edition Dungeon Magazine modules series, the Savage Tide Adventure Path, the dungeon of Lost Tamoachan is revisited in the December 2006 Dungeon Magazine #141 'The Sea Wyvern's Wake' chapter.

In 2017, Wizards re-released the adventure updated to the 5th Edition rules as part of the Tales from the Yawning Portal collection.

== Reception ==
Doug Traversa reviewed the adventure in The Space Gamer No. 29. He stated that "This module is well thought out and is very detailed. The illustrations are accurate and add an extra dimension to the adventure. Reference sheets contain a combat matrix for the three characters included, and a monster index with the statistics of all the creatures in the shrine." He continued: "The shrine has two entrances, but the rules are written based on the assumption that you enter through the tournament entrance. If you choose to use the other, more obvious, entrance, the DM must read the rules from back to front, which can get confusing. Although the map and rules are detailed, they are also confusing. And parts of the scoring system seem less than logical. Traversa concluded his review by saying, "Of all the modules TSR has published (and I have read them all) I would rate this right in the middle. For those DMs who have trouble designing their own dungeons, I say buy it. For those who don't, save your [money] and make your own shrine."

Jim Bambra reviewed The Hidden Shrine of Tamoachan for the British RPG magazine White Dwarf, and gave the module an 8 out of 10 overall. Bambra noted the adventure's "Central and South American flavour", and "setting... from Aztec and Mayan culture and mythology". He added, "the room descriptions portray this very well and the accompanying booklet of black and white illustrations enhance the atmosphere even more." He felt that the treasures were skimpy, and that Dungeon Masters running the adventure as part of a campaign would need to increase the total value to make exploration worthwhile to the players. He felt that the recommended levels of 5th-7th was a bit unrealistic, as the lower level characters would have a very hard time in the shrine, and felt that 6th-8th level characters would have a reasonable chance of success. He called the adventure "enjoyable and colourful", especially for players who think and act fast. Bambra said it would appeal more to gamers who like mental challenges and problem solving.

The Hidden Shrine of Tamoachan was ranked the 18th greatest Dungeons & Dragons adventure of all time by Dungeon magazine in 2004.

Dungeon Master for Dummies includes The Hidden Shrine of Tamoachan in its list of the ten best classic adventures, noting the players' destination as a "Mayan-style temple full of surprising traps and devious tricks."

Ken Denmead of Wired listed the module as one of the "Top 10 D&D Modules I Found in Storage This Weekend". According to Denmead, "the whole dungeon is trap-o-palooza, and it's really important to listen, pay attention, and always assume that when something looks too good to be true, you're probably dead already, so go ahead and grab it."
