= To Find a King =

Dungeons & Dragons adventure module

- The cover of the module, with art by Keith Parkinson
- Code: C4
- TSR product code: 9107
- Rules required: Advanced Dungeons & Dragons 1st edition
- Character levels: 4–7
- Campaign setting: Generic
- Authors: Bob Blake
- First published: 1985

Linked modules
- C1, C2, C3, C4, C5

To Find a King is an adventure module for the first edition of the Advanced Dungeons & Dragons fantasy role-playing game. It was written by Bob Blake and published in 1985 by TSR. As part of the Competition, or C-series of modules, it contains material that was first used as a tournament adventure at Gen Con XVI. The module is designed for a party of ten characters at levels 4–7 and can be run as either a competition module or as part of a campaign.

== Plot summary ==
The High Council is floundering, the population is restless, and the monks are excited by an ancient prophecy they have discovered. The player characters are assembled to restore the Celtic kingdom of Pellham to its former glory.

To Find a King is the first adventure in the two-part "Prophecy of Brie" series, and the plot of the scenario includes a section set in the wilderness, wilderness section, as well as a bugbear lair, and a mirror maze.

== Publication history ==
C4 To Find a King was written by Bob Blake, with a cover designed by Keith Parkinson and interior illustrations by Ron Randall. It was published by TSR in 1985 as a 32-page booklet with two outer folders. To Find a King was used as the AD&D tournament module at Gen Con XVI, as a four-round competition module. The C in the module code represents the first letter in the word competition, the name of C1–C6 module series.

To Find a King contains the first four adventures in the Prophecy of Brie story arc: The Wheel of Time, Locksmith, The Perils of Symbolism, and Divine Wine. The sequence concludes in module C5 The Bane of Llywelyn. This series of adventures was originally published as limited edition modules RPGA3 The Forgotten King and RPGA4 The Elixir of Life, available for sale only to members of the RPGA.

== Reception ==
In 1985, Jez Keen reviewed the module in Imagine magazine, giving it a favorable critique. Keen noted that "play becomes unnecessarily bogged down in combat", but pointed out that the competitive character of tournaments is intended to "separate the good players from the rest", making these harder to complete than the average scenario. The adventures also test intellect, according to Keen, with "a right way and a wrong way to do everything in this module". Pointing out that they contain nothing "overwhelmingly silly" that could destroy the atmosphere of play, Keen called the scenarios "a pleasure to play and run".

Commenting on the "Prophecy of Brie" series, Lawrence Schick wrote in his 1991 book Heroic Worlds that it "unfortunately has nothing to do with oracular cheese".
