= Jeff R. Leason =

American game designer

- Occupation: Game designer

Jeff R. Leason is a game designer who has worked primarily on role-playing games.

== Career ==
Jeff R. Leason co-wrote the Advanced Dungeons & Dragons adventure The Hidden Shrine of Tamoachan (1980) with Harold Johnson.

As a staffer for Mayfair Games, Leason worked with Troy Denning, Louis Prosperi, and David Ladyman on the second edition of Chill (1990).

In June 2021, Ernie Gygax with Leason created a new, separate company also named "TSR." The company is based out of Lake Geneva, Wisconsin; they plan to release table top games and operate the Dungeon Hobby Shop Museum, which is located in the first office building of the original TSR. Other original TSR employees contributing to the startup include Larry Elmore and James M. Ward. Leason is the curator of the museum.
