= Lee Dannacher =

American television producer (1950–2018)

- Born: January 5, 1950; Wabash, Indiana, U.S.
- Died: March 4, 2018 (aged 68); Fort Wayne, Indiana, U.S.

Emily Sue Dannacher (January 5, 1950 – March 4, 2018; commonly known as Lee Dannacher) was an American television producer. She was known for her production of the 1980s animated television series ThunderCats and SilverHawks.

== Early life and education ==
Dannacher was born in Wabash, Indiana, in 1950 to Dr. William Dennis Dannacher and Emily Marteen Rhymer. She graduated Wabash High School in 1968, before attaining a bachelor's degree at the University of Oklahoma. She received a master's degree from Nova Southeastern University in 2008.

== Career ==
She worked for a decade at the Division of Children and Family Services in Peru, but was known for her production of the 1980s animated television series ThunderCats and SilverHawks. She worked with Rankin/Bass Animated Entertainment for 25 years.

In 2001, while living in New York, she directed Santa, Baby!, another Rankin/Bass production.

She was working as an investigator for child protective services in Indiana at the time of her death.

== Death ==
Dannacher died in 2018, aged 68.
