= Adrian Gonzales =

Storyboard artist (1937–1998)

- Born: Adrian Gonzales; 1937 Philippines
- Died: October 23, 1998 (age 60–61)
- Areas: Penciller, Inker
- Pseudonym: Ading Gonzales
- Notable works: All-Star Squadron; Arak, Son of Thunder; Super Powers

Adrian Gonzales (1937 – October 23, 1998) was a Filipino comics artist best known for his work on All-Star Squadron, Arak, Son of Thunder, and Super Powers for DC Comics.

== Career ==
Adrian Gonzales began his career as a comic book artist in the 1960s working for such Philippine comics publications as Hiwaga Komiks and Tagalog Klasiks. He made his debut in the US comics market with the story "The Young Wolves" in Our Army at War #252 (Dec. 1972) published by DC Comics. He only did sporadic work for US publishers until 1981 when he became the penciler on the All-Star Squadron series. Editor Len Wein hired Gonzales as a replacement for the previous artist Rich Buckler and notified the title's creator/writer Roy Thomas with a note stating "You're going to like Adrian Gonzales". He drew the series for 13 issues which included a crossover with the Justice League of America and then became the artist on the Arak, Son of Thunder title. DC Comics produced several Superman stories for the German comics market in the early 1980s and Gonzales drew one of them. In addition, he contributed to Archie Comics' 1983 revival of the Mighty Crusaders series. A New Teen Titans drug awareness comic book sponsored by IBM and drawn by Gonzales was published in cooperation with The President's Drug Awareness Campaign in 1984. That same year, he penciled the Super Powers limited series which tied-in with the Kenner Products toyline of the same name. After a brief stint working on the Sgt. Rock series, Gonzales left the comics industry in 1985 and became a storyboard artist for several animation studios including Hanna-Barbera and Ruby-Spears.

== Bibliography ==
=== Archie Comics ===
- Blue Ribbon Comics #6 (1984)
- The Fly #2, 4 (1983)
- Lancelot Strong, the Shield #1 (1983)
- Mighty Crusaders #4–5, 8 (1983–1984)

=== DC Comics ===
- All-Star Squadron #6–18, Annual #1 (1982–1983)
- Arak, Son of Thunder #15–25, Annual #1 (1982–1984)
- Batman #340–341, 351 (1981–1982)
- The Brave and the Bold #185 (Batman and Green Arrow) (1982)
- Detective Comics #530, 532 (Green Arrow backup stories) (1983)
- The Flash #303 (Firestorm backup story) (1981)
- Ghosts #103, 105–108, 110 (1981–1982)
- G.I. Combat #273 (1985)
- House of Mystery #294–295, 298–304, 306–313, 321 (1981–1983)
- New Teen Titans (The President's Drug Awareness Campaign) #3 (1984)
- Our Army at War #252 (1972)
- Secrets of Haunted House #41–44 (1981–1982)
- Sgt. Rock #391, 394, 397, 399–401, 405–406 (1984–1985)
- Superman Spectacular #1 (1982)
- Super Powers #1–4 (1984)
- The Unexpected #214–216 (1981)
- Unknown Soldier #257–259 (1981–1982)
- Weird War Tales #105, 113 (1982)
- The Witching Hour #27–28, 30–31 (1973)
- Wonder Woman #293 (1982)
- World's Finest Comics #273–274, 288–291, 293 (Superman and Batman) (1981–1983)

=== Marvel Comics ===
- Unknown Worlds of Science Fiction #4, Annual #1 (1975–1976)

=== Western Publishing ===
- Gremlins #11365 (1984)

Preceded by Rich Buckler	All-Star Squadron penciller 1982–1983	Succeeded by Jerry Ordway
Preceded by Alfredo Alcala	Arak, Son of Thunder penciller 1982–1984	Succeeded by Ron Randall
