= Trekker (comics) =

Science fiction comic book series by Ron Randall

Publication information
- Publisher: Dark Horse Comics; Image Comics
- Format: Ongoing series
- Genre: Science fiction
- Publication date: January 1987
- Main character: Mercy St. Clair

Creative team
- Written by: Ron Randall
- Artist(s): Ron Randall, Dave Dorman
- Letterer: Ken Bruzenak
- Colorist(s): Jeremy Colwell, Grace Allison
- Editor: Jim Gibbons

Trekker is a retrofuturistic, science fiction comic book series written and illustrated by American artist Ron Randall. The series follows the turbulent escapades of Mercy St. Clair, a bounty hunter or "Trekker" making her way through the violent streets of New Gelaph in the year 2226. The comic has primarily been published in various formats by Dark Horse Comics, but has also appeared in single issues from Image Comics and online at Thrillbent. Since September 2011 the comic's entire run has been serialized online by Randall at Trekkercomic.com. The site continues to update with new material from Randall every Monday, with Randall privately publishing graphic novel collections of the newer stories.

== Creative team ==
The majority of the Trekker stories are written and illustrated by Randall with lettering by Ken Bruzenak and colors (where applicable) by Jeremy Colwell. Additional letterers include Steve Haynie and David Jackson. The Trekker episode "Chinks" featured finished art by Dave Dorman. "City of the Dead", Randall's crossover story with Karl Kesel for Thrillbent, featured colors by Jeremy Colwell and Grace Allison. The Trekker Omnibus, released by Dark Horse in 2013, was edited by Jim Gibbons.

== Characters ==
Mercy St. Clair: A young, troubled bounty hunter working the streets of New Gelaph. Her skills are unmatched but her stubbornness and tough exterior tend to hold back her personal relationships. Mercy is scraping by on bounties from tracking down criminals the over-taxed police can't reach. As the series progresses, Mercy's journeys carry her farther from her home city into blasted wastelands, other cities and the stars. As her world expands, she becomes aware of the forces that shape her role in the greater playing field of interstellar human society. In the midst of this morally ambiguous and complex universe, Mercy gets the sense that she has a larger role to play. Mercy is confirmed as queer in the online continuation series when she begins a romantic relationship with Molly; in the Dark Horse comics she is paired romantically with men, including Paul Clemmons (see below).

Molly Sundowner: Mercy's girlfriend and owner of a modest music store in New Gelaph. Molly is self-possessed and blessed with a generous outlook on life, something she tries, often unsuccessfully, to transfer to the stony Mercy. On the surface, they seem oddly matched, but ultimately no one is more important to the emotionally distant Trekker.

Paul Clemmons: Mercy's erstwhile boyfriend. A cop on the New Gelaph force, Paul is surprisingly emotional for an officer of the law and is hellbent on getting Mercy to open up to him.

Thompson Richards: An academic living in Mercy's apartment complex. He assists her with some crucial research in "The Trail to Scarmen's Burn" (Trekker #2, July 1987), but his motives seem more rooted in romantic attraction than scholarly altruism.

Roger Vincent: A rival Trekker who butts in on Mercy's business in "Rules of the Game" (Trekker #3, October 1987). While Roger is eager to collaborate in catching a crook, Mercy is adamant in her policy of working alone. However, when Vincent cons Mercy of her share of the bounty he jumps to the top of her hit list. The two cross paths again in "Vincent's Share" (Dark Horse Presents #21, August 1988) with unexpected results.

Lt. Alex St. Clair: Mercy’s uncle, a lieutenant on the New Gelaph police force. Alex is Mercy’s only surviving blood relative. He does what he can to help his headstrong and impulsive niece. Alex tends to rely on Mercy for assistance when the bureaucracy of the police force prevents him from making progress on a case.

Scuf: Mercy’s pet dox (a dog/fox cross breed). Scuf is becoming ancient, but remains Mercy's only connection to her early days.

Lasmusi: An underworld thug, but often an ally and reliable source for Mercy. They share a mutual respect, but both know that trust can only extend so far in their world.

Jason Bolt: An agent of the mysterious resistance organization Rigel. Bolt and Rigel use non-lethal methods to resist the powerful government forces. Mercy dismisses their efforts quixotic, their methods naive and Bolt a hopeless idealist, yet he keeps reappearing in her life and adventures. It is clear that Rigel has its eye on the young Trekker, regardless of her opinion of them.

== Reception ==
In January 2013, the Trekker webcomic collection received an extensive write-up on science fiction news site io9. Reviewer Lauren Davis calls it "a fun and smartly written pulp" and praises Randall's take on a hardbitten character who remains flawed enough to draw us into her world with a sense of empathy. In her introduction to the Trekker omnibus edition, Gail Simone notes: "It's of stuff like Trekker that revolutions are begun. A female character that is sexy but not sexualized, that is tough but not without flaws and doubts, and that is dangerous and without compassion or remorse".

== Publication history ==
- Dark Horse Presents #4-6, Dark Horse, January 1987
- Trekker #1-6, Dark Horse, May 1987 - March 1988
- Dark Horse Presents #20-22, Dark Horse, August - September 1988
- Trekker Collection, Dark Horse, November 1988
- Trekker Color Special, Dark Horse, July 1989
- Dark Horse Presents #39-41, Dark Horse, May - June 1990
- Decade of Dark Horse #2, Dark Horse, August 1996
- Trekker Special #1, Image, June 1999
- Dark Horse Presents #24-29, Dark Horse May - October 2013
- Trekker Omnibus, Dark Horse, August 2013 (collection; no new material)
- Trekker: The Train to Avalon Bay - Dark Horse - April 2014
- Trekker: Rites of Passage - Dark Horse - February 2017
- Dark Horse Presents #33, Dark Horse - April 2017
- Trekker: Chapeltown - Kickstarter Funded - February 2018
- Trekker: The Darkstar Zephyr - Kickstarter Funded - November 2018
- Trekker: Battlefields - Kickstarter Funded - June 2019
- Trekker: The Complete Journey Vol. 1 - Kickstarter Funded - October 2020
- Trekker: Hunter's Moon - Kickstarter Funded - (c) October 2020
- Trekker: Reckoning On Rigel - Kickstarter Funded - (c) August 2021
- Trekker: Blood in the Wind - Kickstarter Funded - (c) May 2022
- Trekker: The Complete Journey Vol. 2 - Kickstarter Funded - March 2023
- Trekker: Spice - Kickstarter Funded - (c) December 2023
- Trekker: Rebel Heart - Kickstarter Funded - (c) August 2024
- Trekker: The Ties that Bind - Kickstarter Funded - (c) February 2026
