= The Bane of Llywelyn =

Dungeons & Dragons adventure module

- The cover of the module, with art by Keith Parkinson.
- Code: C5
- TSR product code: 9109
- Rules required: Advanced Dungeons & Dragons 1st edition
- Character levels: 4–7
- Campaign setting: CM
- Authors: Bob Blake
- First published: 1985

Linked modules
- C1, C2, C3, C4, C5

The Bane of Llywelyn is an adventure module for the first edition of the Advanced Dungeons & Dragons fantasy roleplaying game. The adventure was written by Bob Blake and published by TSR in 1985 as part of the Competition, or C-series of modules, and contains material first used in a tournament adventure at GenCon XVI. C5 The Bane of Llywelyn continues the story that started in C4 To Find a King.

== Plot summary ==
Two hundred years before the start of the adventure, the royal line of kings of Pellham was deposed and replaced by a High Council. The current council is well-meaning but hopelessly incompetent. Excitement and unrest grip the land of Pellham, and the people agree that a drastic change is needed for the kingdom to survive. An ancient Prophecy of Brie foretells that a king from the past will return to restore the kingdom. The symbols of the ancient kings have been recovered, the keys to the royal tomb are in hand, powerful magics to revive the long-dead king have been secured at great cost. The king's burial location remains unknown. The player characters must find where he is buried.

== Publication history ==
C5 The Bane of Llywelyn was written by Bob Blake, with a cover by Keith Parkinson and interior illustrations by Ron Randall, and was published by TSR in 1985 as a 32-page booklet with two outer folders. It is a sequel to To Find a King, as the second of two adventures in the Prophecy of Brie series. The Bane of Llywelyn was used for the Advanced Dungeons & Dragons tournament which took place at GenCon XVI. The C in the module code represents the first letter in the word competition, the name of C1–C6 module series. The four parts of C5 were originally published as separate mini-modules included in issue Nos. 16–19 of the RPGA's Polyhedron newsletter: RPGA5 The Riddle of Dolmen Moor, RPGA6 The Incants of Ishcabeble, RPGA7 Llewelyn's Tomb, and RPGA8 ...And the Gods Will Have Their Way.

== Reception ==
Mark Davies reviewed the module in Imagine magazine, giving it a positive review. He noted that it is more flexible than C4 and can be used without that module, even in a campaign setting. The Bane of Llywelyn contains four scenarios comprising both dungeon and wilderness elements, and introduces two new monsters and one new weapon. Davies pointed out that it is "above average in conception" with "a lot of good ideas". However, he suggested the module be used for 4–7 player characters of level 6–8, as he considered one of the scenarios too tough. Davies viewed some of the puzzles and riddles as "obtuse", noting that successful tournament play in the US "depends more on high IQ than on role playing". His main criticism was aimed at the maps—their poor quality or, for the final scenario, the total lack thereof. Pointing out that it could be easily transplanted from its original Celtic setting into another cultural environment, Davies viewed it as "a good ideas module", but not one that could be played without work on the game master's part.

== See also ==
- List of Dungeons & Dragons modules
