= SilverHawks =

1986 American animated television series

- Genre: Science fiction Superhero
- Developed by: Rankin/Bass
- Directed by: Arthur Rankin Jr.; Jules Bass
- Voices of: Bob McFadden; Peter Newman; Larry Kenney; Maggie Wheeler; Earl Hammond; Doug Preis
- Composer: Bernard Hoffer
- Country of origin: United States
- No. of seasons: 1
- No. of episodes: 65

Production
- Executive producers: Arthur Rankin Jr.; Jules Bass; Lee Dannacher; Masaki Izuka
- Running time: 23 minutes
- Production company: Rankin/Bass Animated Entertainment (Note: Animation outsourced to Japanese and South Korean animation studios Pacific Animation Corporation and Hanho Heung-Up.)

Original release
- Network: Syndication
- Release: September 8 – December 5, 1986

SilverHawks is an American superhero animated television series developed by Rankin/Bass Productions and distributed by Lorimar-Telepictures in 1986. The animation was provided by Japanese studio Pacific Animation Corporation. In total, 65 episodes were made. It was created as a space-based equivalent of their previous series ThunderCats.

As was the case with ThunderCats, there was also a SilverHawks comic book series published by Marvel Comics under the imprint Star Comics.

== Plot ==
The series is set in the 29th century, in the fictional Limbo Galaxy. A bionic space enforcer called Commander Stargazer recruited the SilverHawks, heroes who are "partly metal, partly real", to fight the evil Mon*Star, an escaped alien crime boss who transforms into an enormous armor-plated creature with the help of Limbo's Moonstar. Joining Mon*Star in his villainy is an intergalactic mob consisting of Yes-Man, Buzz-Saw, Mumbo-Jumbo, Windhammer, Mo-Lec-U-Lar, Poker-Face, Hardware, and "the musical madness of" Melodia.

Quicksilver (formerly Jonathan Quick) leads the SilverHawks, with his metal bird companion Tally-Hawk at his side. Twins Emily and Will Hart became Steelheart and Steelwill, the SilverHawks's technician and strongman respectively. Country-singing Bluegrass piloted the team's ship, the Maraj. Rounding out the group is a youngster "from the planet of the mimes", named "The Copper Kidd" and usually called "Kidd" for short, a mathematical genius who speaks in whistles and computerized tones. The SilverHawks' bionic bodies are covered by a full-body close-fitting metal armor that only exposes the face and an arm, the armor is equipped with a retractile protective mask, retractable under-arm wings (except Bluegrass), thrusters on their heels, and laser-weapons in their shoulders.

== Characters ==
=== Silverhawks ===
The SilverHawks in the show's title sequence. Left to right: Copper Kidd, Bluegrass, Quicksilver (with Tally-Hawk perched on arm), Steelheart, Steelwill.

==== Main Silverhawks ====
- Commander Stargazer (voiced by Bob McFadden) is a tough and grizzled police officer with bionic capabilities. Older than the other SilverHawks, he longs to return to Earth for either a vacation or for retirement. Stargazer chiefly serves as the SilverHawks "eyes and ears", keeping them apprised of their current situation. His armor covers the upper left portion of his head as well as his body, and his left eye has been replaced by a telescopic lens.
- Quicksilver / Captain Jonathan Quick (voiced by Peter Newman) is the former head of Interplanetary Force H and the field leader of the SilverHawks. Known for his quick reflexes and thinking, Quicksilver is an accomplished tactician and athlete.
- Bluegrass (voiced by Larry Kenney) is second-in-command of the SilverHawks and the chief pilot of the group as well as a cowboy at heart. Bluegrass is the only active SilverHawk who is incapable of flight. He uses his weapon/instrument (portrayed in the toyline as his weapon-bird with the name Sideman) and his lasso. Bluegrass has an interface with the Maraj's piloting system, which he has affectionately dubbed "Hot Licks".
- Steelheart/Sergeant Emily Hart and Steelwill/Sergeant Will Hart (voiced by Maggie Wheeler and Bob McFadden) are fraternal twin siblings who had artificial hearts implanted during their transformation. Steelheart and Steelwill are the "gearheads" of the team. Due to an empathic bond, when one sibling feels something, the other feels it as well. Physically, they are the strongest members of the team.
- The Copper Kidd (vocal effects provided by Pete Cannarozzi) is the youngest member of the SilverHawks and the only one not from Earth. A mathematical genius from the Planet of the Mimes, he "speaks" in tones and whistles. A natural acrobat, the Copper Kidd wields two razor-edged discs which he throws like a Frisbee.

==== Minor Silverhawks ====
- Hotwing (voiced by Adolph Caesar in earlier episodes, Doug Preis in later episodes) is a magician and skilled illusionist who received his powers from a mystical energy force that chose him to fight against injustice. He has to recharge these powers every 14 years or else he will die.
- Flashback (voiced by Peter Newman) is a time-traveling Silverhawk from the far future. When he meets the 'much older' Stargazer who tells him of the fateful day the SilverHawks died, Flashback travels back in time to save them.
- Moon Stryker (voiced by Larry Kenney) is a turquoise Silverhawk who can propel himself through space by a powerful cyclone generated from propellers that emerge from his waist. He is cocky but an expert marksman.
- Condor (voiced by Bob McFadden) is an old ally of Stargazer who left the SilverHawks to become a private investigator before the series, but eventually returned. He wields an energy whip and uses a jetpack in place of wings.

==== SilverHawk's Fighting Hawks ====
The Fighting Hawks are hawk-like partners of the SilverHawks.

- Tally-Hawk is Quicksilver's Fighting Hawk. Its beak can tear through metal and can shoot lasers. He is the only one of the fighting hawks to appear in the show and serves as a spy for the Silverhawks. Like the Silverhawks and Stargazer, he is "partly metal, partly real". Effectively a cyborg with a significantly increased intelligence, Tally-Hawk's head also serves as the bird's head icon seen in the show's title as well as occasionally appearing on the chests of the Silverhawks in certain scenes, or in the show's title sequence. He developed a short lived rivalry with the Sky Shadow, a being native to Limbo that was also cybernetically enhanced and intended to be Tally-Hawk's superior opposite number, requiring the capture of Tally-Hawk himself in order to create the enhanced Sky Shadow. Freed from imprisonment before the process could be completed, Tally-Hawk battled and defeated Sky Shadow, though the two creatures continued to be considered rivals in the toy line.
- Side Man is Bluegrass's Fighting Hawk. It can fire lasers.
- Rayzor is Steelwill's Fighting Hawk. Its wings can cut through metal.
- Stronghold is Steelheart's Fighting Hawk. It can lift heavy objects.
- May-Day is Copper Kidd's Fighting Hawk. It has sonic-based abilities.
- Sly-Bird is Stargazer's Fighting Hawk. It can photograph and record anything.
- Gyro is Hotwing's Fighting Hawk. It has spinning abilities.
- Backlash is Flashback's Fighting Hawk. It can travel through time.
- Tail-Spin is Moon Stryker's Fighting Hawk.
- Jet Stream is Condor's Fighting Hawk.

=== Supporting characters ===
- Seymour (voiced by Peter Newman) is a space cabbie who serves as comic relief.
  - Zeek is a green bird-like alien who often accompanies Seymour on cab rides.
- Harry is a robot who works as a bartender at a bar on the planet Fence.
- Professor Power is a lightbulb-headed scientist who works in the Artificial Sun and controls it. He is friendly with the SilverHawks and often helps them.
- Sanders is the governor in Bedlama, a planet similar to the Earth.
- Monotone (voiced by Maggie Wheeler) is the computer that rules the planet Automata.
- Grodd the Informer is an informant. He appears in episode 32 when he informs the mob of a rock that is supposed to be worth a fortune, the Savior Stone.
- Lord Cash (voiced by Larry Kenney) is the head of Dolar, a planet with large amounts of money.
  - Gotbucks is Dolar's security chief.
- Warden Lockup (voiced by Larry Kenney) is a prison warden with a bird-like face who is in charge of Penal Planet 10, where Limbo's criminals are kept.
  - Cell Guard #1 is an unnamed rhinoceros-like creature who works for Warden Lockup as a prison officer.
  - Cell Guard #2 is an unnamed one-wheeled robot who works for Warden Lockup as a prison officer.

==== Federal Interplanetary Force ====
The Federal Interplanetary Force is an interplanetary organization based on Earth. They are the founders of the SilverHawks.

- General Rawlings (voiced by Larry Kenney) is the leader of the Federal Interplanetary Force.
- Professor Ghemakain is an alien who creates weapons for the SilverHawks.
  - Nurse Mabis (voiced by Maggie Wheeler) is a nurse who works for the Federal Interplanetary Force and the assistant of Professor Ghemakain.
- Brigadier Brightlight is a high-ranking member of the Federal Interplanetary Force.

=== Villains ===
==== The Mob ====
The Mob is an organized crime group and the primary antagonists of the series that commits crimes throughout Limbo and operate from Brim*Star. They travel in three open-cab spacecraft called the Zoomer, Road Star, and Limbo Limo.

- Mon*Star (voiced by Earl Hammond) is a wealthy alien crime boss with a feline-like body and an eyepatch (with the symbol of a black star) covering his left eye. Using the power of Limbo's Moon*Star and his Transformation Chamber, Mon*Star gains spiky armor and has his left eye restored, allowing him to channel the crimson Light Star beam. Mon*Star has a history with Stargazer and extends that animosity to the SilverHawks.
  - Sky-Runner is a giant "space-squid" that serves as Mon*Star's mode of transportation. Mon*Star's beams equip Sky-Runner with armor.
- Yes-Man (voiced by Bob McFadden) is the personal assistant of Mon*Star who has a snake-like appearance. As a member of Mon*Star's Mob, Yes-Man operates the Transformation Chamber. Yes-Man once used the powers of the Moon*Star alongside Mon*Star, giving him increased mental abilities.
- Hardware (voiced by Bob McFadden) is a purple creature who works as an inventor and weapons specialist for Mon*Star's Mob. He carries an oversized rucksack full of self-engineered weapons and equipment called a Roll-Up Bag.
- Melodia (voiced by Maggie Wheeler) is a musical mistress who serves as a nemesis and counterpart to the SilverHawks' Bluegrass who wields a keytar-like "Sound Smasher". Melodia is usually seen cruising around in the Limbo Limo, causing havoc and assorted acts of terror as a diversion.
- Windhammer (voiced by Doug Preis) is an eco-terrorist member of Mon*Star's Mob who wields a tuning fork that enables him to manipulate weather on planets and space. He has blue skin, long blonde hair, and large elf-like ears.
- Mo-Lec-U-Lar (voiced by Doug Preis) is a shapeshifter whose primary form is a humanoid body made of spheres. He serves as the master of disguise and leading hitman of Mon*Star's Mob.
- Buzz-Saw (voiced by Bob McFadden) is a sentient war machine with circular saw-cutting blades across his body that can be used as projectile weapons.
- Poker-Face (voiced by Larry Kenney) is a sunglasses-wearing robot who has slot machines for eyes and carries a cane decorated with playing card suits. He is the owner of a space station called the Starship Casino, which is stationed outside of the SilverHawks' jurisdiction. Poker-Face charges Mon*Star billions of dollars for new inventive ideas against the SilverHawks.
- Mumbo-Jumbo (voiced by Peter Newman) is a robotic Minotaur who is the muscle for Mon*Star's Mob. He is aided by his ability to "bulk up", growing larger and increasing his strength. Mumbo-Jumbo is the sworn enemy of Steelheart.
- Timestopper (voiced by Larry Kenney) is a cocky 14-year-old delinquent with the ability to suspend all ambient motion and kinetic energy around him for one minute. He is often in the services of Mon*Star, but has no qualms about getting in his way if he is not paid.
- Zero (voiced by Peter Newman) is a long-nosed shady character who steals memories using a cattle prod-like weapon and records them on cassettes.
- Smiley is a boxer robot and old enemy of Stargazer who is the heavyweight champion of Limbo.
- Darkbird (voiced by Peter Newman) is an evil robotic duplicate of Quicksilver created by Hardware.

===== The Mob's Fighting Hawks =====
The Mob has Fighting Hawks of their own:

- Sky Shadow is Mon*Star Fighting Hawk. It resembles a bat and has claws on its wings. Like Tally-Hawk, it is the only one of the Mob's fighting hawks to appear in the show. In its original appearance in the show, it was acquired at the behest of Mon*Star, wanting an opposite number to Tally-Hawk. In order to enhance the Sky Shadow, the Mob captured Tally-Hawk, intending to use Tally-Hawk himself to create a superior form of cybernetic enhancement for the Sky Shadow, intending for him to be more powerful than Tally-Hawk, including stronger iterations of the powers he possessed. The process was interrupted by the Silverhawks and Tally-Hawk was freed. Due to the process being incomplete, the Sky Shadow was weaker than Tally-Hawk and soundly defeated by him. The Sky Shadow made at least one other appearance in the show, acting as a spy for Mon*Star, much as Tally-Hawk would do for the Silverhawks. Despite the lack of interaction between the two creatures in the show beyond the first episode in which it appeared, Sky Shadow was considered to be Tally-Hawk's rival and opposite number in the toy line.
- Prowler is Hardware's Fighting Hawk. It resembles a dragon.
- Volt-Ure is Mo-Lec-U-Lar's Fighting Hawk. It shares the same abilities as him as well as the ability to generate lasers.
- Shredator is Buzz-Saw's Fighting Hawk. It has razor wings and a saw on its head.
- Airshock is Mumbo-Jumbo's Fighting Hawk. It can transform into a hammer for his use.

==== Three Outlaws from Fence ====
They appear in many episodes and are friendly to Melodia and Poker-Face, though the three are usually betrayed by the Mob. They are often seen playing cards at the Sini*Star Diner on the planet Fence:

- The Space Bandit is the robotic leader of the Three Outlaws.
- Rhino (voiced by Peter Newman) is a rhinoceros-like mutant.
- Cyclops is a one-eyed balloon-bodied creature. When shot, he loses air and flies around like a punctured balloon.

==== Other villains ====
- Bounty Hunter is a monster with a bulldog-like face who was imprisoned by Stargazer for 200 years. He can absorb energy directed at him and use it to sustain and empower himself.
- Rattler (voiced by Peter Newman) is Yes-Man's uncle.

== Production and release ==
Rankin/Bass followed up their successful ThunderCats series with this series about a team of heroes in the 29th century who were given metal bodies and wings to stop organized crime in the Galaxy of Limbo. SilverHawks featured many of the same voice actors who had worked on ThunderCats, including Larry Kenney, Peter Newman, Earl Hammond, Doug Preis and Bob McFadden.

Lorimar-Telepictures was purchased by Warner Bros. in 1989, and the rights to SilverHawks are now held by Warner Bros. Television Distribution.

Reruns later aired on Cartoon Network from 2000 to 2001. The series is airing on MeTV Toons as of 2025.

=== Episodes ===
No.	Title	Written by	Original release date
1	"The Origin Story"	Peter Lawrence	September 8, 1986
When the intergalactic crime boss Mon*Star breaks out of his prison during a Moon*Star eruption that the prison staff tries to keep from reaching the window of Mon*Star's cell, Earth sends a team of bio-mechanically enhanced humans to capture him.
2	"Journey to Limbo"	Leonard Starr	September 9, 1986
The SilverHawks arrive at Hawk Haven and have their first encounter with Mon*Star and his Mob.
3	"The Planet Eater"	William Overgard	September 10, 1986
Mon*Star employs the Sky Chomper to "eat" other spaceships and feed the debris to the Planet Eater, his biggest and most devastating weapon yet.
4	"Save The Sun"	Peter Lawrence	September 11, 1986
The Mob seize control of the massive Artificial Sun, the main source of power in the Galaxy of Limbo.
5	"Stop Timestopper"	Lee Schneider	September 12, 1986
A delinquent with the power to stop time joins Mon*Star's gang and helps them plunder the Crystal Mine of Automata.
6	"Darkbird"	Stephen Perry	September 15, 1986
An evil clone of Quicksilver blasts his way into Dolar, the bank planet of Limbo Galaxy, and takes its banking boss Lord Cash hostage.
7	"The Backroom"	William Overgard	September 16, 1986
Inside the Starship Casino, Poker-Face is hiding a new destructive weapon that Mon*Star is only too eager to make use of.
8	"The Threat of Dritt"	Bruce Smith	September 17, 1986
After their ambassador is kidnapped by Mon*Star, the mighty Triangulons threaten to destroy Hawk Haven unless Quicksilver rescues their ambassador in eight hours.
9	"Sky-Shadow"	Kimberly Morris	September 18, 1986
Tally-Hawk is kidnapped by the Mob so that Hardware can create an evil version of the SilverHawks' companion for their leader Mon*Star.
10	"Magnetic Attraction"	Chris Trengove	September 19, 1986
While transporting the criminal Poker-Face to Penal Planet 10, Steelheart is attacked by Hardware and his new weapon the Super Magnetizer.
11	"Gold Shield"	Bruce Smith	September 22, 1986
The SilverHawks must work quickly to build a Gold Shield to protect Hawk Haven before it is disintegrated by Mon*Star's latest weapon.
12	"Zero The Memory Thief"	Jeri Craden	September 23, 1986
Zero the Memory Thief wipes out Commander Stargazer's knowledge of the Mob's latest plan to destroy Earth using a Mega Missile.
13	"The Milk Run"	Lee Schneider	September 24, 1986
The SilverHawks arrest Melodia, but Hardware's Pinball Beam blasts her free and traps Commander Stargazer inside Hawk Haven.
14	"The Hardware Trap – Part I"	Peter Lawrence	September 25, 1986
The SilverHawks devise a plan through which Quicksilver is able to apprehend Hardware, but Mon*Star is not going to give up on his weapons' expert without a fight.
15	"The Hardware Trap – Part II"	Lee Schneider	September 26, 1986
Buzz-Saw cuts his way into the Penal Planet to free Hardware who then exacts his revenge on Quicksilver by blasting him into space.
16	"Race Against Time"	Chris Trengove	September 29, 1986
With the intention of destroying Hawk Haven, Mon*Star organizes "The Great Meteor Race". In order to officiate it, the Mob breaks Poker-Face out of prison.
17	"Operation Big Freeze"	Jeri Craden	September 30, 1986
Mon*Star orders Windhammer and Hardware to generate a galactic ice storm that is so powerful that it threatens to freeze the entire Galaxy of Limbo.
18	"The Ghost Ship"	Chris Trengove	October 1, 1986
In order to infiltrate Hawk Haven, a secret Mob attack force led by Hardware hide inside an abandoned spaceship.
19	"The Great Galaxy Race"	William Overgard	October 2, 1986
Mon*Star challenges the SilverHawks to a space race through the Galaxy of Limbo in which the Mob employ every cheat in the book to win.
20	"Fantascreen"	Stephen Perry	October 3, 1986
Hardware's latest invention is a device that turns SilverHawks into mindless zombies and it is up to Steelheart to rescue her comrades.
21	"Hotwing Hits Limbo"	Peter Lawrence	October 6, 1986
When Mon*Star captures all the SilverHawks, Earth sends Hotwing, a former magician, squad commander, and the newest member of the SilverHawks to rescue them.
22	"The Bounty Hunter"	J.V.P. Mundy	October 7, 1986
Mon*Star's Mob pulls off a daring jailbreak to free Stargazer's sworn enemy the Bounty Hunter, a villain who feeds on energy.
23	"Zeek's Fumble"	Peter Lawrence	October 8, 1986
The Mob chases Seymour and Zeek the Beak all over Limbo because they have a microfilm of all the SilverHawks' secrets.
24	"The Fighting Hawks"	Kimberly Morris	October 9, 1986
When the Mob programs the machines of Automata to produce fearsome copies of Sky-Shadow, the Steel twins work frantically to produce a counter-weapon.
25	"The Renegade Hero"	Leonard Starr	October 10, 1986
The Mob replace the governor of Bedlama with Mo-Lec-U-Lar and then plan to use the planet's military might against the SilverHawks.
26	"One on One"	William Overgard	October 13, 1986
The Mob creates exact clones of the SilverHawks and sends them on a deadly mission against Commander Stargazer.
27	"No More Mr. Nice Guy"	Chris Trengove	October 14, 1986
Yes-Man joins Mon*Star in his transformation chamber and emerges with more power and intelligence before deciding to take control of the Mob himself.
28	"Music of the Spheres"	Lee Schneider	October 15, 1986
As Halley's Comet passes through Limbo Galaxy, the SilverHawks plan to steer it towards Mon*Star's base of operation Brim*Star.
29	"Limbo Gold Rush"	Stephen Perry	October 16, 1986
A space prospector strikes gold on Automata but three outlaws jump his claim and plan to steal all his gold for themselves.
30	"Countdown to Zero"	Chris Trengove	October 17, 1986
When the Copper Kidd goes to Automata to fix Monotone, he is ambushed by the Mo-Lec-U-Lar and Zero the Memory Thief who is there to drain all of the supercomputer's memory banks.
31	"Amber Amplifier"	Bill Ratner	October 20, 1986
Mo-Lec-U-Lar steals the Amber Amplifier, the Artificial Sun's energy magnifier, and Hardware then fits it to his energy gun to create the most formidable weapon that the SilverHawks have faced.
32	"The Saviour Stone"	Bob Haney	October 21, 1986
The Mob and the SilverHawks battle for possession of a rock which is the only item that can restore the Earth's decaying magnetic field.
33	"Smiley"	Bruce Shlain	October 22, 1986
The Mob activates Smiley, a super heavyweight robot champion of Limbo who Stargazer once defeated, and Mon*Star sends him to torch the SilverHawks with this powerful heat waves.
34	"Gotbucks"	Bob Haney	October 23, 1986
Lord Cash hires the security robot Gotbucks to act as Dollare's new security chief, but he gets abducted by the Mob.
35	"Melodia's Siren Song"	Lawrence DuKore	October 24, 1986
When Quicksilver and Tally-Hawk go to the aid of a gold freighter under attack, they are captured by Hardware and the Mob.
36	"Tally-Hawk Returns"	Stephanie Swafford	October 27, 1986
Mo-Lec-U-Lar steals the remote control of Tally-Hawk and Hardware then uses it to instruct Tally-Hawk to attack the SilverHawks.
37	"Undercover"	Danny Peary	October 28, 1986
Mon*Star and his Mob block the supply of oil to the Artificial Sun of Limbo Galaxy as they plan to create their own artificial sun on BrimStar.
38	"Eye of Infinity"	Kenneth Vose	October 29, 1986
Mon*Star gets his hands on the notorious Eye of Infinity, the most destructive force in the universe. Hotwing plans to retrieve the crystal before Hardware can figure out how to use its powers.
39	"A Piece of the Action"	Bruce W. Smith	October 30, 1986
Mon*Star threatens to flood the planet of Bedlama unless he is paid a hefty ransom.
40	"Flashback"	Kimberly Morris	October 31, 1986
A young SilverHawk named Flashback travels back in time to prevent the annihilation of the SilverHawks at the hands of the Mob.
41	"Super Birds"	Bruce Shlain	November 3, 1986
Under Mon*Star's orders, Hardware constructs a giant Sky-Shadow to destroy the SilverHawks.
42	"The Blue Door"	Cy Young	November 4, 1986
Disguising himself as Mon*Star, Mo-Lec-U-Lar leads the SilverHawks on a wild goose chase while the real Mon*Star attacks Hawk Haven.
43	"The Star of Bedlama"	Kimberly Morris	November 5, 1986
The SilverHawks and the Mob both have their eyes set on a valuable diamond.
44	"The Illusionist"	Jeri Craden	November 6, 1986
Mon*Star manages to put Hotwing under the spell of the Light Star and then sends him to attack Hawk Haven.
45	"The Bounty Hunter Returns"	Stephen Perry	November 7, 1986
The Bounty Hunter breaks out of Penal Planet 10 and sets up a new base in order to exact revenge on the SilverHawks.
46	"The Chase"	Bruce W. Smith	November 10, 1986
Mo-Lec-U-Lar steals the new key to Dolar's main vault and leads Steelwill on a wild goose chase around the Galaxy of Limbo.
47	"Switch"	Beth Bornstein & J.V.P. Mundy	November 11, 1986
A strange cosmic storm switches the personalities of everybody, turning the SilverHawks bad and the Mob good.
48	"Junkyard Dog"	Bob Haney	November 12, 1986
By disguising himself as a waste collector, Mo-Lec-U-Lar steals a case containing vital mechanical parts without which Commander Stargazer will not be able to survive.
49	"Window in Time"	J.V.P. Mundy	November 13, 1986
Hardware manages to travel back in time to Earth when the SilverHawks are just leaving for Limbo Galaxy and it is up to Flashback to stop him from sabotaging the Miraj.
50	"Gangwar – Part I"	William Overgard	November 14, 1986
Melodia and Poker-Face decide to overthrow Mon*Star and take control of the Mob themselves resulting in a civil war between both sides of the Mob.
51	"Gangwar – Part II"	William Overgard	November 17, 1986
Using the Sky-Chomper, Mon*Star breaks out Hardware and Buzz-Saw from the Penal Planet 10 before turning the Sky-Chomper on Hawk Haven.
52	"Sneak Attack – Part I"	Cy Young	November 18, 1986
Under Commander Stargazer's order, Quicksilver and Hotwing embark on a dangerous mission to BrimStar to arrest Mon*Star, but the Mob are not going to let their leader be taken without a fight.
53	"Sneak Attack – Part II"	Cy Young	November 19, 1986
Hardware frees Mon*Star from the Penal Planet 10 using a box containing the Moon*Star's power and Mon*Star then launches a deadly attack on the SilverHawks.
54	"Moon*Star"	Alice Knox & Peter Larson	November 20, 1986
Poker-Face hands Mon*Star a chunk of the Moon*Star which endows the villain with incredible new powers and the SilverHawks now have to stop this Super Mon*Star.
55	"Diamond Stick-Pin"	Peter Lawrence	November 21, 1986
The Mob hires Zeek to be their limo driver and then hand him a diamond stick-pin bomb to annihilate the SilverHawks.
56	"Burnout"	Bill Ratner	November 24, 1986
Zero steals Professor Power's memory and focuses all the energy of the Aritifcial Sun on Hawk Haven where Stargazer and the Steel twins are trapped.
57	"Battle Cruiser"	Lee Schneider	November 25, 1986
Mon*Star plans to go to Earth and start a crime wave while Stargazer employs two new SilverHawks named MoonStryker and Condor to help him.
58	"Small World"	Kimberly Morris	November 26, 1986
The Mob shrink and steal Automata, but are unaware the planet has a faulty valve which could cause it to explode and destroy the entire Galaxy of Limbo.
59	"Match-Up"	Bruce W. Smith	November 27, 1986
After being imprisoned in Penal Planet 10, Windhammer organizes a spectacular boxing match inside the prison to create a diversion which would allow him to escape.
60	"Stargazer’s Refit"	William Overgard	November 28, 1986
Under Mon*Star's orders and armed with deadly meltdown discs, Mo-Lec-U-Lar goes out to eliminate Commander Stargazer. Due to a detour to the Starship Casino, Mon*Star enlists Poker-Face to help finish the job. Now the SilverHawks must get to Stargazer before the meltdown discs go off.
61	"The Invisible Destroyer"	Dow Flint Kowalczyk	December 1, 1986
Hardware's latest invention is an Invisible Laser Satellite which he intends to use to conquer Bedlama.
62	"The Harder They Fall"	Chris Trengove	December 2, 1986
After rebuilding the giant Sky-Shadow, the Mob plan to use it to tow Penal Planet 10 to Brim*Star and enlist all the prisoners in the Mob.
63	"Uncle Rattler"	Beth Bornstein	December 3, 1986
Yes-Man's uncle Rattler steals the SilverHawks payroll shipment before the Mob can get to it.
64	"Zeek’s Power"	Matthew Malach	December 4, 1986
The Magical Orb sent from Earth to recharge Hotwing's powers is intercepted by Zeek who successfully convinces the Orb to endow him with Hotwing's powers.
65	"Airshow"	Peter Lawrence	December 5, 1986
Disguising himself as the Miraj, Mo-Lec-U-Lar wreaks havoc in the Air Show organized by the SilverHawks to celebrate the Independence Day in the Galaxy of Limbo.

== Merchandise and other media ==
=== DVD releases ===
In October 2008, Warner Home Video released SilverHawks: Volume 1 on DVD in Region 1 for the first time. The 4-disc set contains the first 32 episodes of the series. The second volume of the series was released three years later on DVD in region 1 via their Warner Archive Collection. This is a Manufacture-on-Demand (MOD) release, available exclusively through Warner's online store and Amazon.com. The 4-disc set contains the remaining 33 episodes of the series.

=== Action figures ===
The SilverHawks action figure collection based on the series was produced by Kenner and first released in 1987. LJN, the makers of the ThunderCats figures, originally were to produce the SilverHawks figures but decided to pass on the project at the last minute. Each figure was packaged with a companion bird and, similar to Kenner's Super Powers Collection toyline, had an action feature of some type. The second series of figures is harder to find than the first with Ultrasonic Quicksilver being the most difficult. The MonStar with Laser Lance, Copper Kidd with Laser Discs, and the Copper Racer vehicle were not produced but were shown in the 1988 Kenner toy catalog. The Hawk Haven Fortress was also never released, due to the high production costs it would incur. Many recurring characters were never made, including Yes-Man, Melodia and Poker-Face.

==== Weapon-birds ====
The weapon-birds are cyborg animal companions released with most of the action figures. While Tally-Hawk appeared in almost all of the episodes in the series, all other "weapon-birds" only appeared in a handful of episodes. In the episode "The Fighting Hawks", the weapon-birds for the Steel Twins were accidentally switched from the toy versions. The weapon-birds are listed below, with their toy partner's name in parentheses.

- Tally-Hawk (Quicksilver)
- Side Man (Bluegrass)
- Rayzor (Steelheart)
- Stronghold (Steelwill)
- May-Day (Copper Kidd)
- Sly-Bird (Stargazer)
- Gyro (Hotwing)
- Backlash (Flashback)
- Tail-Spin (Moon Stryker)
- Jet Stream (Condor)
- Sky Shadow (Mon*Star) - a bat, rather than a bird
- Prowler (Hardware) - a green flying dragon
- Volt-Ure (Mo-Lec-U-Lar)
- Shredator (Buzz-Saw)
- Airshock (Mumbo-Jumbo)

In the 2020s, Super7 released a new line of SilverHawks action figures.

=== Other merchandise ===
Several other pieces of SilverHawks merchandise were released in the 1980s, including a board game, puzzles, bed sheets, and a plastic pencil pouch with the main characters on one side. Pajamas were also produced, which included wing flaps under the arms to more resemble the characters.

=== Comics ===
Marvel Comics' child-friendly imprint Star Comics (which also published ThunderCats) released a seven-issue series. Writers included Steve Perry, who also wrote for the animated series.

Issue	Title	Cover date	Synopsis
1	The Origin Story	August 1987	When Mon*Star escapes Penal Planet 10 and breaks out the rest of the Mob, Commander Stargazer calls Earth for reinforcements. Four human volunteers and one volunteer from the Planet of Mimes are transformed into Silverhawks and are soon on their way to the Limbo Galaxy and Hawk Haven, their home for the next few centuries, but Mon*Star organizes a welcome party.
2	Kidnapped	October 1987	When Tallyhawk catches Mon*Star and Hardware plans to kidnapp Commander Stargazer, the latter decides to get all of the Mob's secrets from their computer banks.
3	Clementine	December 1987	A Space Bandit claims Automata and his reputation brings Melodia to get the gold for Mon*Star. Bluegrass goes to fetch them, but soon has to save himself. It turns out that Automata has secrets that no one but the prospector knew.
4	Copper Kidd Beats The Odds	February 1988	The gambler Percunius Wadsworth Wellington shows up at Hawkhaven saying he has been robbed by the Mob. Poker-Face has a new game at the Starship Casino and was not happy that Wellington won big win before Poker-face rigged it. The Silverhawks, however, cannot do anything to help him as the Starship Casino lies beyond the Lightyear Limit, which is outside of their jurisdiction. Copper Kidd volunteers to take him home but decides to help him win back his money instead. Stargazer orders the other Silverhawks to stop him because Earth would disband them if he beat the Mob and what the Mob would do to him is not worth mentioning.
5	Fantascreen	April 1988	Hardware builds a machine that will show someone's greatest fantasy and make them a mindless slave. When Steelwill is enslaved by it, Steelheart and the other Silverhawks go to his rescue.
6	A Few Laughs With The Old Crowd	June 1988	When Stargazer bungles the Silverhawks capture of the Mon*Star and the Mob, he decides to head back to Earth for upgrades. When Mon*Star conquers Hawkhaven and Copper, Kidd is the only one left to call for help.
7	Darkbird	August 1988	Lord Cash of the Bankworld of Dolar calls for help when Quicksilver appears to attack, but Tallyhawk has a report from Brim*Star, which reveals that Hardware built a fake Silverhawk for Mon*Star.

A new SilverHawks comic was released by Dynamite Entertainment in 2025.

=== Other appearances ===
Mon*Star makes a cameo appearance in the ThunderCats (2011) episode "Legacy".

Solar Opposites features a lengthy subplot that parodies the IP called SilverCops.

=== Reboot ===
A Nacelleverse reboot of SilverHawks was in development since 2021.

== See also ==
- TigerSharks
