= Psi-Force =

Comic book series

- Issue #1 cover

Publication information
- Publisher: Marvel Comics
- Schedule: Monthly
- Format: Ongoing series
- Publication date: 1986 to 1989
- No. of issues: 32, plus one Annual

Creative team
- Created by: Archie Goodwin; Walt Simonson
- Written by: Stephen Perry; Danny Fingeroth; Fabian Nicieza
- Artist(s): Mark Texeira; Bob Hall; Ron Lim

Psi-Force is a comic book series created by Archie Goodwin and Walt Simonson and published by Marvel Comics under their New Universe imprint from 1986 to 1989. It ran for 32 issues and an annual (October 1987).

It concerned a group of adolescents who had developed psionic powers following the "White Event" which had created most of the paranormals in the New Universe. These teens, along with federal agent Emmett Proudhawk, could pool their powers into a psychic construct called the "Psi-Hawk".

The title includes some of the first comics work of writer Fabian Nicieza (#9, 13, 16-32) and artist Ron Lim (#16-22).

== Publication history ==
Almost from the beginning, Psi-Force was one of the New Universe's most popular series. Danny Fingeroth, the regular writer from issue #3 through to #15, remarked that:

The characters were well-conceived and designed. As individuals and as a team, they worked very well in an X-Men-ish kind of way. Like an X-Men series, Psi-Force was about a team of 'hunted and hounded' superpowered young people who didn't always get along, but when push came to shove were always there for each other. Those qualities may have been what readers found most familiar and relatable about them. Of course, Mark Texeira's and Bob Hall's art was exciting and set a powerful tone for the look and feel of the book [...]

== Fictional team biography ==
Psi-Force was brought together by a paranormal named Emmett Proudhawk. Before the White Event, he worked for the CIA on a project investigating children with higher than usual ESP scores. After the White Event, he gained telepathic powers, including the ability to control others and project bolts of force. At the same time he began to have prophetic dreams. The dreams led him to gather those children who had higher ESP scores and had, after the White Event, developed new abilities. He compiled a list of names, which included all of the original members of the team, as well as Thomas Boyd. Of those, he could only find Tucker, Crawley, Jessup, Ling, and Inyushin. He visited the hometown of each teen and mentally compelled them to run away to San Francisco. Then he personally rescued Inyushin from a Russian project investigating paranormals and brought her to the United States. He was killed by a KGB agent code-named 'Mindwolf' (who was working for the Siberian Project and also possessed psionic powers similar to Proudhawk's) shortly after gathering the Sanctuary kids together. When Mindwolf used his powers and attacked the teens, Tucker felt a mental compulsion to take Proudhawks's medallion. He had the others concentrate upon the medallion with him, and thus discovered they could create a gestalt entity known as the "Psi-Hawk".

Psi-Hawk possesses the powers of all of those who combine their mental energy to make it, magnified to a far greater degree than any of them could manage separately. Originally, it was thought that only the original five members could create it, but it was later discovered that Thomas Boyd could also contribute to it. Still later, Lindsey Falmon helped create it (who was neither on Proudhawk's list, nor did she have any memories of Proudhawk or Psi-Hawk). It has been created by as few as two people and as many as six; however, on the one occasion more than five members participated, Psi-Hawk became dangerously unstable and began attacking those who created it until one of them fell unconscious.

Any time a member wanted to leave the group and strike out on their own, they soon felt an irresistible mental urge to return (or, if they were able to withstand it, for the rest of the group to follow). This bound the group together, unwillingly, until Sanctuary was destroyed and they fled in several directions. In this instance, they did not feel the compulsion.

At the end of issue #24, Tucker, Jessup, Boyd, Ling, and Lindsey Falmon created the Psi-Hawk for the last time. This time, whether due to the group's relative experience or because of the addition of Falmon's powers to the link, the five paranormals lost consciousness and controlled Psi-Hawk directly. In the fight with Rodstvow that ensued, Psi-Hawk was destroyed (although those creating it survived, falling into a coma).

The series was noted for the characters' more confrontational interactions with others, particularly authority figures. They came into conflict with many different groups which wanted to capture them including both the Soviet and American governments. Early issues of the book stressed the nature of the team as one of runaways. When Fabian Nicieza took over writing chores the stories began to focus more on the group's interactions with various paramilitary organizations. At one point, one of their number, Thomas Boyd, was drafted into the US military and the remaining members staged a raid on a US Army base to rescue him. Nicieza also introduced the shadowy Medusa Web organization, a group of mercenaries/terrorists who were occasional opponents and occasional allies of the group. Towards the end of the book's run, Psi-Force spent some time at a Siberian training facility for Russian paranormals. When the Russian paranormal Rodstvow, who had been a repeated enemy of the group, showed up the teens teamed up with the Medusa Web and the Russians to combat him. After this, the remaining members became operatives of the Medusa Web.

In issue #32, the foreword is that of a Playboy interview with Tucker (who is stated as being in hiding), which is dated 1998 - roughly ten years after the events of the issue. He reveals that Psi-Force has remained together as a team and that Crawley has returned to the team. He is also asked about the condition of Johnny Do, after a well-publicized "incident at Los Alamos", and replies that he's injured, but still alive.

== Main characters ==
=== Original members ===
- Wayne Tucker - also known as Network, he is a telepath, with the ability to push people into following his mental commands.
- Michael Crawley - known as Salvo and later Dynamite, his ability is to cause explosions with his mind. He decides to leave the group for Thomas Boyd to join in the Annual and later winds up at the Clinic for Paranormal Research.
- Tyrone Jessup - also known as Voyager, his ability is originally described as astral projection, but later discovered to be the projection of his consciousness into an unknown energy form with a specialized control of the electromagnetic spectrum. He is drafted into the United States Army after the death of Psi-Hawk, and he loses control of his powers.
- Kathy Ling - sometimes called Shockwave, but rarely used this name. Powerful telekinetic, she is initially very reluctant to use her powers, but she grows to like it. She leaves the group in the last issue, but it is implied she later returns.
- Anastasia (Stasi) Inyushin - a healer, Stasi is a Russian national who has been illegally smuggled into the United States by CIA agent Emmett Proudhawk and is highly sought after by her government. She dies in issue #24, from the strain of healing the rest of the team from near death.

=== Later members ===
- Thomas Boyd - originally called Psi-Stalker, in Emmet Proudhawk's files, he is listed as 'Syphon'. He is an energy siphon/adrenaline vampire. Boyd has the ability to quickly exhaust the energy in a living organism and can use his powers through a medium (such as fighting batons, or capture lines). In some ways, his power is the reverse of Inyushin's, and her power can hurt him by forcing him to expend his own energy. He is originally enlisted to hunt down the team, but turns on his employer and, later, requests their help. He joins the team in the Annual.
- Lindsey Falmon - known as Overtime, she has the powers of psychometry. She starts a relationship with Tucker while he is on the run in Seattle, and later reveals she has her own powers, despite not being on Proudhawk's list. She runs away with him and, in the final issue, agrees to marry him.
- Johnny Do/Dehman Doosha - a pyrokinetic, Johnny Do is highly autistic and was treated as a virtual animal in a Russian project investigating paranormals. Boyd was able to forge a connection with him and became his caregiver. "Johnny Do" is the name given to him by Boyd—his real name and background prior to his capture by the Soviet government are unknown; Dehman Doosha (Demon Within) is what his captors called him.
- Sedara Bakut - a teleporter, Sedara is a rebel in Afghanistan before she is recruited by Psi-Force in the final issue. She can create window-like portals to places she has been, or to places which have been put into her mind by another. She also has the ability to use her teleportation offensively, using the energy that creates the portal as some sort of force bolt.

=== The Medusa Web ===
The Medusa Web is a covert organization of mercenaries established well before the White Event. Its purpose at one point was said to be to save the world from itself by providing them an enemy for them to unite against. At the end of Psi-Force, the remaining members join the Medusa Web as an independent subgroup.

- Babel (Thame Panagitis) - leader, with the ability to understand every language, and for his words always to be understood in the language of the hearer's native tongue. His name is a reference to the Tower of Babel.
- Backfire - possesses the ability to reflect most attacks back on the attacker. He is a coward at heart and carries only blanks in his sidearm because he once shot himself in the foot.
- Donner Kopf - his ability is to generate hypersonic energies with his voice through the use of mechanical implants. His name is German for "Thunderhead".
- Electrique - composed of living electricity, Electrique was dispersed and possibly killed by Jessup's "astral form".
- Gatto di Sangue - former Olympic gymnast who found her athletic ability increased dramatically after the White Event. Her name translates to "Bloodcat". She is killed by Rodstvow during the battle near the Siberian Project.
- Imprint - able to transmit everything he sees and hears as electromagnetic impulses that can be recorded. He is essentially a human recording device, although he is mute. He has also shown the ability to interface with other people and record through them.
- Potiphar - non-paranormal mercenary.
- Relampago - gifted with superhuman speed. She was accidentally killed by Stasi while trying to capture her. Her name is Spanish for "Lightning".
- Skybreaker - possesses the power of flight, though he used exterior wings for stabilization and a large number of small arms for greater attacking range.
- Troublemaker - said to be quadruple-jointed, and able to move any of his joints in any direction. Troublemaker is also skilled in some form of martial arts. Also a gifted agent provocateur, Troublemaker is skilled in provoking others.

=== Crasniye Solleetsi ===
Crasniye Solleetsi is team of Soviet paranormals run by the KGB. The name Crasniye Solleetsi is Red Sun in corrupted Russian (the correct Russian term is Krasnoye Solntse/Красное Солнце). Characters' names are in transcribed/corrupted Russian as well.

At some point before the White Event, the Soviet Union established the Siberian Project in the Yamal Peninsula of Siberia. The goal of the project was to investigate people with reputed paranormal abilities, such as ESP, or unusual talents in other areas, including those with an exceptional green thumb.

When the White Event struck, at least one of their subjects, Anastasia Inyushin, developed a full-fledged, provable paranormal ability, the ability to heal with a touch. Unfortunately for the Soviet government, CIA agent Emmett Proudhawk abducted the girl shortly afterward.

Despite this, the Siberian Project had proved the existence of Paranormals and within two years had begun assembling a team of paranormals, under the control of the KGB, to serve the country's interests. They weren't too picky about the members of this team, either, and included several people with psychological problems ranging from severe autism to complete insanity.

One of the team's first missions was to assist the Soviet military in Afghanistan against the Mujahideen where they were able to push the rebels out of their stronghold.

Later, the members of Psi-Force were taken to the Siberian Project and Red Sun was among the forces to ensure they were kept in line. When Justice and the Medusa Web arrived to break Psi-Force free, Red Sun initially fought them, but they were forced to join forces against the threat of Rodstvow, who had gone completely mad and was destroying people indiscriminately.

- Coojeechiscue (Cubic): Field leader of Crasniye Solleetsi, she possesses the power to create cube-shaped force fields of varying sizes which can be used to either protect or contain people. Her first name is Nadehzda.
- Rodstvow (Kinship, The People's Hero): Insane paranormal of extraordinary power, with the abilities of flight, energy projection, teleportation, and molecular combustion, among others. He was once an artist but descended into insanity when his power manifested after the White Event, causing the loss of several of his body parts. His family was also accidentally killed during his initial manifestation, after which the Soviet government took custody of him. His destroyed body parts were replaced with a specialized plastic-like substance in which his bio energy was able to retake human form.
- Sillatochca (Force Point): Former mechanic with the ability to increase the pressure in objects with his mind, often causing them to explode. His power causes him severe migraines. Leonid Vishnevesky was blackmailed into the program with threats against his family and is opposed to what he is made to do. Killed by Potiphar as he was helping Overtime escape the Siberian Project.
- Shivowtnoeh (Animal): A Russian high school student named Irina Mityushova, began a bestial transformation shortly after the White Event. She possesses superhuman strength and senses, and natural weaponry including claws and horns. Her rational mind has also retreated behind a bestial personality.
- Dehman Doosha (the Demon Within): A young, highly autistic pyrokinetic. He eventually joined the team Psi-Force.

=== Other notable nonparanormals ===
- Colby Shaw - ran the San Francisco branch of Sanctuary, the halfway house for runaways that the group called home for most of the first 16 issues.
- The Skipper - CIA Agent and friend of Emmett Proudhawk.
- Derek Shiningstar - CIA Agent and former friend of Emmett Proudhawk. Shiningstar faked Boyd's death to keep him away from Proudhawk, and then trained him.
- Eugene Proudhawk - Emmett Proudhawk's brother. He lives on a reservation.
- Andrew Chaser - a reporter, Chaser wrote a book Power for the Preying about Psi-Force after their supposed deaths based on his own investigations and friendship with Tyrone Jessup. The book made life very difficult for Jessup's family, who were forced to relocate because of anti-paranormal prejudice.

== Writers ==
- Stephen Perry - Psi-Force #1-2 (November 1986-December 1986)
- Danny Fingeroth - Psi-Force #3-6, 8, 10-11, 14-15 (January 1987-April 1987, June 1987, August 1987-September 1987, December 1987-January 1988); Psi-Force Annual #1 (1987)
- David Michelinie - Psi-Force #7 (May 1987)
- Fabian Nicieza - Psi-Force #9, 13, 16-32 (July 1987, November 1987, February 1988-June 1989); "Healing Time" in Justice #23 (September 1988) [back-up story]
- Rosemary McCormick - Psi-Force #12 (October 1987)

== Art ==
- Mark Texeira - Psi-Force #1-5, 8 (November 1986-March 1987, June 1987); Psi-Force Annual #1 (October 1987)
- Mike Vosburg - Psi-Force #6 (April 1987)
- Bob Hall - Psi-Force #7, 9, 11-12, 14 (May 1987, July 1987, September 1987-October 1987, December 1987)
- Rod Whigham - Psi-Force #10 (August 1987)
- Javier Saltares - Psi-Force #13, 15 (November 1987, January 1988); "Healing Time" in Justice #23 (September 1988) [back-up story]
- Ron Lim - Psi-Force #16-22 (February 1988-August 1988)
- Don Heck - Psi-Force #22 (August 1988)
- Graham Nolan - Psi-Force #23, 25-26 (September 1988, November 1988-December 1988)
- Mark Bagley - Psi-Force #24 (October 1988)
- Alan Kupperberg - Psi-Force #27 (January 1989)
- Rodney Ramos - Psi-Force #28-32 (February 1989-June 1989)

== Alternative versions ==
=== newuniversal - Dr. Emmett Proudhawk ===
Dr. Emmett Proudhawk, by newuniversal #3 writer Warren Ellis and artist Salvador Larroca.

An alternative version of Dr. Emmett Proudhawk is introduced in issue #2 of Warren Ellis's re-imagining of the New Universe, newuniversal. Dr. Emmett Proudhawk is a CIA consultant and Native American Wicasa Wakan, which loosely translated means "Medicine Man" but is more accurately translated as Doctor of Mystery (where mystery here refers to the mystery and power of the spirit, of magic, of visions, and of divinity). Proudhawk undertook a vision quest in order to understand what the White Event is and why it occurred, and was surprised to find himself in the superflow, and even further surprised when his spirit guide, a hawk, spoke clearly when answering his questions (usually any answers given in a vision quest are metaphorical). When Proudhawk asked what the White Event was, his spirit guide answered that "it is the invitation to live with God and walk in the world with his powers".

The superflow was further explained to Proudhawk as the "wakan condition", and is the source of all wakan (mystery), dreams, and visions come from. While Proudhawk had been able to partially see the superflow while on a normal vision quest (it was never fully visible to him), he had now been "touched" by it, directly implying that he, like four others, had gained superhuman powers. While it may be unclear if Proudhawk has any powers, his spirit guide told him that four others had been touched by wakan before him, and that the many others to follow after him would all need a "doctor who understands mystery".

Proudhawk sees the earth as water, but with a small island upon which he begins his vision quest, complete with campfire. It is unclear if the hawk represents the alien device, another superhuman, or if the hawk is a function of any paranormal powers he may have, since it has yet to be concretely revealed if Proudhawk is a superhuman.

== Psi-Force in popular culture ==
El Coyote, the main antagonist in the 1986 feature film Firewalker, is portrayed reading Psi-Force #1.
