= Timespirits =

Publication information
- Publisher: Marvel Comics
- Schedule: Irregular
- Format: Limited series
- Publication date: October 1984 – March 1986
- No. of issues: 8

Creative team
- Created by: Stephen Perry; Thomas Yeates

Timespirits is an eight-issue comic book limited series published by Marvel Comics as part of its Epic Comics imprint in 1984. It was created by writer Stephen Perry and Thomas Yeates. Varnae's appearance in #4 indicates that Timespirits is set in the mainstream Marvel Universe despite being a creator-owned title.

In a report published by Folha de S.Paulo, many have pointed to plagiarism of the comic committed in Avatar, the James Cameron film.

== Issues ==
1. Indian Spring, October 1984
2. The Spurtyn Duyvel—part one—Death of a Timespirit, December 1984
3. The Spurtyn Duyvel—part two—The Blacksack of King Ogam, February 1985
4. A Boy and his Dinosaur, April 1985
5. A Song and a Danse, July 1985
6. The Jungle Beat, September 1985
7. The Hand of the Yeti, December 1985
8. Filet of Soul, March 1986
