= The Ghost Tower of Inverness =

Dungeons & Dragons adventure module

- The cover of The Ghost Tower of Inverness; the artwork, by Jim Roslof, depicts two adventurers encountering a creature.
- Code: C2
- TSR product code: 9038
- Rules required: 1st Ed AD&D
- Character levels: 5–7
- Campaign setting: Greyhawk
- Authors: Allen Hammack
- First published: 1979

Linked modules
- C1, C2, C3, C4, C5

The Ghost Tower of Inverness is an adventure module for the Dungeons & Dragons fantasy roleplaying game, set in the game's World of Greyhawk campaign setting. The module's title refers to an ancient magical tower located in the southern Abbor-Alz Hills. The "C" in the module code represents the first letter in the word "competition," the name of C1 – C6 module series.

== Plot summary ==
The player characters go on a quest to find the fabled Soul Gem, a legendary artifact of great power. They must gather the four parts of a key granting them entrance to the Ghost Tower.

Inverness was the fortress of the great wizard Galap-Dreidel, whose magic raised a great stone tower within a formidable keep. The tower was built to house Galap-Dreidel’s most prized possession, an eldritch jewel called the Soul Gem, which could steal life from any creature. The monsters and magic of the tower kept the gem safe for many years, but when Galap-Dreidel vanished, Inverness was seized and its tower was destroyed.

No sign of the Soul Gem was ever found, but local folk talk of seeing a ghostly vision of the tower of Inverness on fog-shrouded nights. Seeking to discover where the Soul Gem was hidden, the characters descend beneath the ruined tower, discovering four pieces of magical metal that bond together to form a key. The key opens the doors to the central chamber beneath the tower, which holds a time portal that takes the characters back to the age when the tower of Inverness was still standing.

Each level of the tower is a deadly gauntlet meant to destroy intruders. Passing through levels of air, earth, fire, and water (the latter featuring reversed gravity) eventually leads the characters to the top of the tower. The Soul Gem is there, but its magic tries to steal the souls of the characters even as they try to claim it.

=== Tournament version ===
Players may choose from one of five pre-determined characters listed in the module. All of the characters are in the dungeon of the Duke Justinian Lorimnar of Urnst for various crimes and charged with the task of recovering the Soul Gem for the Duke:

Hodar - A sorcerer practicing forbidden magic specifically outlawed by the Duke

Zinethar - A priest who led a temple revolt against the Duke's citizens

Lembu - A fighter who killed the palace guard captain and 11 of his men in a barroom brawl

Discinque - A thief who attempted to steal jewels from the crown, only to fall off the wall on top of the guard patrol

Li Hon - A monk indentured into the Duke's service by her monastery in lieu of tax payment

The Duke, after providing gold for the characters to equip themselves, also provides a magic item (the Amulet of Recall) which teleports the party back to the Duke, no matter where they are. After equipping is complete, the palace guard escort the characters to the ruined site of the ghost tower, where players must then figure out actions on their own how to best enter the tower and recover the gem. Tournament Points are added, or deducted, from both team and individual scores depending on how characters choose to handle the situations they encounter. These include a chess room, a "frozen bugbear" room, a "tunnel" room, and others.

When the proper keys from this level are gathered and activated, the party (unbeknownst to them) travel back in time within the Tower, where more challenges await, among them elemental levels of the newly restored tower.

The final level of the tower houses the Soul Gem, which is behind a force field that must be broken before the characters can claim it. Should the characters survive, they use the amulet to return to the Duke and keep all treasure they find (subject to 20% tax). The "twist" at the end is that any character that was killed by the gem can be restored to life by the Duke's Seer.

=== Published version ===
The characters are hired by the Duke to recover the gem, but are not provided starting gold nor subject to the 20% treasure tariff of the spoils. Also, unlike the tournament version, which often specifically states how much damage characters take from certain actions, in the non-tournament version characters are subject to normal random damage rolls. Additional encounters and traps are also added, which are marked "Not for Tournament Use" in the module.

== Publication history ==
The adventure was written by Allen Hammack, with art by Jim Roslof and Erol Otus. The module was originally used for the AD&D tournament at Wintercon VIII, which took place in November 1979 in Detroit, MI. The module had an original print run of 300 numbered copies for sale at the convention in 1979 as a set of 40 loose-leaf pages and a zip-lock bag. This version included illustrations by Erol Otus that were not reprinted later. A printed version bearing a green monochrome cover without the "C2" designation was made available for sale at the convention, but was never published for general distribution. The version is quite rare and highly prized by collectors.

In 1980, the adventure was officially published as AD&D module C2 as a 32-page booklet with an outer folder. This printing featured a red cover with color cover art by Jim Roslof. Interior artists included Jeff Dee, Greg K. Fleming, David S. LaForce, David C. Sutherland III and Erol Otus. As module "C2", it was the second in the C series of modules, a group of unrelated adventures originally designed for competition play.

The Ghost Tower was also printed as #2 of the Advanced Dungeons & Dragons Adventure Gamebooks line.

== Reception ==
The Ghost Tower of Inverness received good reaction on its first release, with Jim Bambra of White Dwarf rating it 8/10 overall and calling it a "thought provoking adventure" in which the final encounter "will have the players sweating in their seats as they struggle to overcome the final obstacle between them and their goal!" In particular, Bambra praised its emphasis on problem solving skills rather than hack and slash combat, noting that "Encounters in the tower are interesting and increase in intensity the nearer players get to their goal." He did recommend that, although the module was recommended for characters level 5–7, higher levels may be needed if the party does not contain eight to ten characters.

Lawrence Schick, in his 1991 book Heroic Worlds, called the Ghost Tower "a topsy-turvy dungeon full of interesting (and deadly) problems".

The module's reputation has stood up in the years since its release, and it was ranked the 30th greatest Dungeons & Dragons adventure of all time by Dungeon magazine in 2004, on the 30th anniversary of the Dungeons & Dragons game.

Ken Denmead of Wired listed the module as one of the "Top 10 D&D Modules I Found in Storage This Weekend". According to Denmead, "this dungeon has some real consequences, and it’s easy to see why it suggests experienced players. If you didn’t have a passing familiarity with the ways to deal with little things like, say, resurrection, or anti-gravity, you’ll learn the definition of fail real fast. All in all, a rousing little adventure, though it would have been nice to find a few more magical weapons before the end."

=== Legacy ===
The Ghost Tower was also mentioned by full name and location in the 2005 movie Dungeons & Dragons: Wrath of the Dragon God. The hero of the movie, Berek, mentions that another character, Dorian, a cleric, had helped him there.

The Ghost of Inverness has also been adapted into a setting mod for the Neverwinter Nights online game and less successfully as a Super Endless Quest book.

In 2003 the RPGA Living Greyhawk campaign released the adventure Return to the Ghost Tower of Inverness. Written by Creighton Broadhurst and Steve Pearce, the four-hour adventure advanced the story several years and featured encounters based on what would remain in the tower after the original expedition. Some background elements, such as the motivations of the Seer of Urnst, were expanded upon to fit the Living Greyhawk campaign's plot and regional system.
