= The Lost Island of Castanamir =

Advanced Dungeons & Dragons adventure module

- The cover of the module, with art by Jeff Easley.
- Code: C3
- TSR product code: 9110
- Rules required: Advanced Dungeons & Dragons 1st edition
- Character levels: 1-4
- Campaign setting: Generic
- Authors: Ken Rolston
- First published: 1984

Linked modules
- C1, C2, C3, C4, C5

The Lost Island of Castanamir (C3) is an adventure module written by Ken Rolston for the first edition of the Advanced Dungeons & Dragons fantasy roleplaying game. The adventure was published in 1984 by TSR. As part of the C(ompetition)-series of modules The Lost Island of Castanamir contains material first used as a tournament adventure. The adventure is intended for five to eight characters of level 1-4.

== Plot summary ==
In this scenario, the adventurers pass through magical portals into a series of interlinked chambers.

The characters are encouraged by a young scholarly mage to voyage into the Sea of Pastures, to explore a mysterious island connected with a number of recent shipwrecks and disappearances. The island is grassy and windblasted, but eventually the characters discover a stone door leading into a subterranean complex. There, they discover 18 rooms linked by secret passages and magical portals. Most of these rooms have been ransacked by a variety of other survivors, human and monstrous. These survivors are likewise trapped within the labyrinth and are either eking out a miserable existence there or else desperately searching for a means of escape.

Also within the building are a number of extraplanar creatures, collectively known as gingwatzim, who can shift between various forms: an energy form (glowing ball of light), an inanimate form (usually a magical weapon), and an animate form (an animal or monster). Eventually the characters may find the exit, and are once again deposited on the dreary islands to await rescue.

== Publication history ==
C3 The Lost Island of Castanamir was written by Ken Rolston, with art by Jeff Easley, and was published by TSR in 1984 as a 32-page booklet with an outer folder.

The "C" in the module code represents the first letter in the word "competition," the name of C1 - C6 module series.

== Reception ==
Chris Hunter reviewed the module in Imagine magazine, giving it a mixed review. He wrote that, as a competition module, it is "so tough that not everyone survives" and thus when used with regular characters Hunter suggested the use of higher level characters. He described the module as disjointed and difficult to DM, as many encounters were not fully thought through by the designers. As this module introduces an "interesting class of creatures", it could also have major long-term consequences for a campaign. According to Hunter, C3 is "good buy" for those looking for a competition module. However, he did not recommend it for an ongoing campaign.

Lawrence Schick, in his 1991 book Heroic Worlds, called The Lost Island of Castanamir "a tricky competition module".
