= Stephen Perry (writer) =

American comics writer

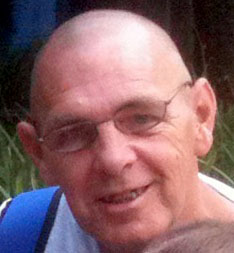
- Born: Stephen J. Perry; December 12, 1954
- Died: May 2010 (age 55) Zephyrhills, Florida, U.S.
- Area: Writer
- Notable works: ThunderCats; Silverhawks

Stephen J. Perry (December 12, 1954 – May 2010) was an American writer of animated cartoons and comic books.

== Biography ==
Perry wrote for the ThunderCats and Silverhawks television shows in the 1980s, as well as the comic book series Timespirits and ThunderCats, among others.

In 2008 Perry was diagnosed with bladder cancer which was operated on, but reemerged in the midst of financial troubles which prompted the help of The Hero Initiative. His profile on Facebook reads, "I discovered, a year ago, I had cancer when I walked into an Emergency Room with no insurance or no doctor. They removed a tumor, kicked me out after five days, and now the cancer is back. Thanks to the Hero Initiative, I survived long enough to get Medicaid and welfare, and now have Doctors, and can get the follow-up care to try and survive the return of the cancer."

Perry released a statement in praise of the help he received from The Hero Initiative which stated, "The Initiative gave me the breathing room to get some Medicaid and food stamps, and while we are always in danger of losing our home, electricity and belongings at any moment, I will always be grateful from the depths of my heart for the past six months of fairly solid home life I have had with my little boy."

Spurred on by Steve Bissette's plea to help his friend, fellow writer Elizabeth Massie headed a fundraiser for Perry on Facebook with the help of writer Laura Anne Gilman, and Horror World which started on May 3, 2010, and raised $1,140 by May 14. By the end of that fundraiser, it had been a few days since friends or family had heard from Perry.

=== Disappearance ===
According to news reports, Stephen Perry and his roommates, Roxanne and James Davis, disappeared from their home in Zephyrhills, Florida, in May 2010, with the last sighting of him being on May 9. The Davises were arrested on May 21 on "probation and drug charges". In the parking lot of a motel in Tampa, Florida, on May 16, police found a severed arm in a van registered to Perry following complaints of a foul smell.

Over two weeks went by without public confirmation of his death, and on May 27, the Zephyrhills police confirmed that Steve Perry was the victim of a homicide. The police also investigated whether there was a connection with a $10 million winning lottery ticket that was bought at a nearby store just before Perry disappeared. Ultimately, no connection was found.

James Davis, who had previously served three jail sentences for kidnapping and robbery, was charged with first-degree murder in July 2010. Not all of Perry's remains had been found at that time. Around that same time, Davis was convicted of the unrelated drug offense he had been arrested for in May. He was imprisoned for the next 12 years.

The murder trial against James Davis began in May 2022. The jury found Davis guilty, and he was sentenced to life in prison, without possibility of parole.

Other reports include:

- Stephen R. Bissette's blog
- An article on Comic Book Resources
- An article on io9

== Bibliography ==
=== Comics ===
- "Not Yeti" and "Incunabula", Abyss (1976)
- "Kultz", in Epic Illustrated #6 (June 1981)
- "A Frog is a Frog", Bizarre Adventures #31 (Apr. 1982)
- "Dracula: The Blood Bequest", Bizarre Adventures #33 (Oct. 1982)
- "The Ballad of Hardcase Bradley", Vanguard Illustrated #7 (Jul. 1984)
- Timespirits, 8-issue series (1984–1986)
- "A Change of Mind", in T.H.U.N.D.E.R. Agents #1 (Nov. 1984)
- "The Dump Man" and "A Base and Nasal Hunger", in Creepy #146 (Jun. 1985)
- "Noman", in T.H.U.N.D.E.R. Agents #3-4 (Nov. 1985 - Feb. 1986)
- Psi-Force #1-2 Marvel Comics (Jul-Aug 1986)
- Salimba 3-D, 2-part series (Aug-Sep 1986)
- "The Saurian Remains", Amazing High Adventure #4 (Nov. 1986)
- Thundercats #14, 16, 19, Star Comics (1987–1988)
- Silverhawks #s 1-7, Star Comics (1987-1988)
- "Ah... Christmas", Amazing Adventure #1, Marvel Comics (Mar. 1988)

=== Television animation ===
==== Thundercats ====
- "The Doomgaze"
- "Safari Joe"
- "Queen of 8 Legs"
- "Feliner" (2-parts)
- "Tight Squeeze"
- "Trapped"

==== Silverhawks ====
- "Darkbird"
- "Fantascreen"
- "Limbo Gold Rush"
- "The Bounty Hunter Returns"

=== Theater ===
- Muties
- Spindlewheel
