= Ron Randall =

American comic book artist

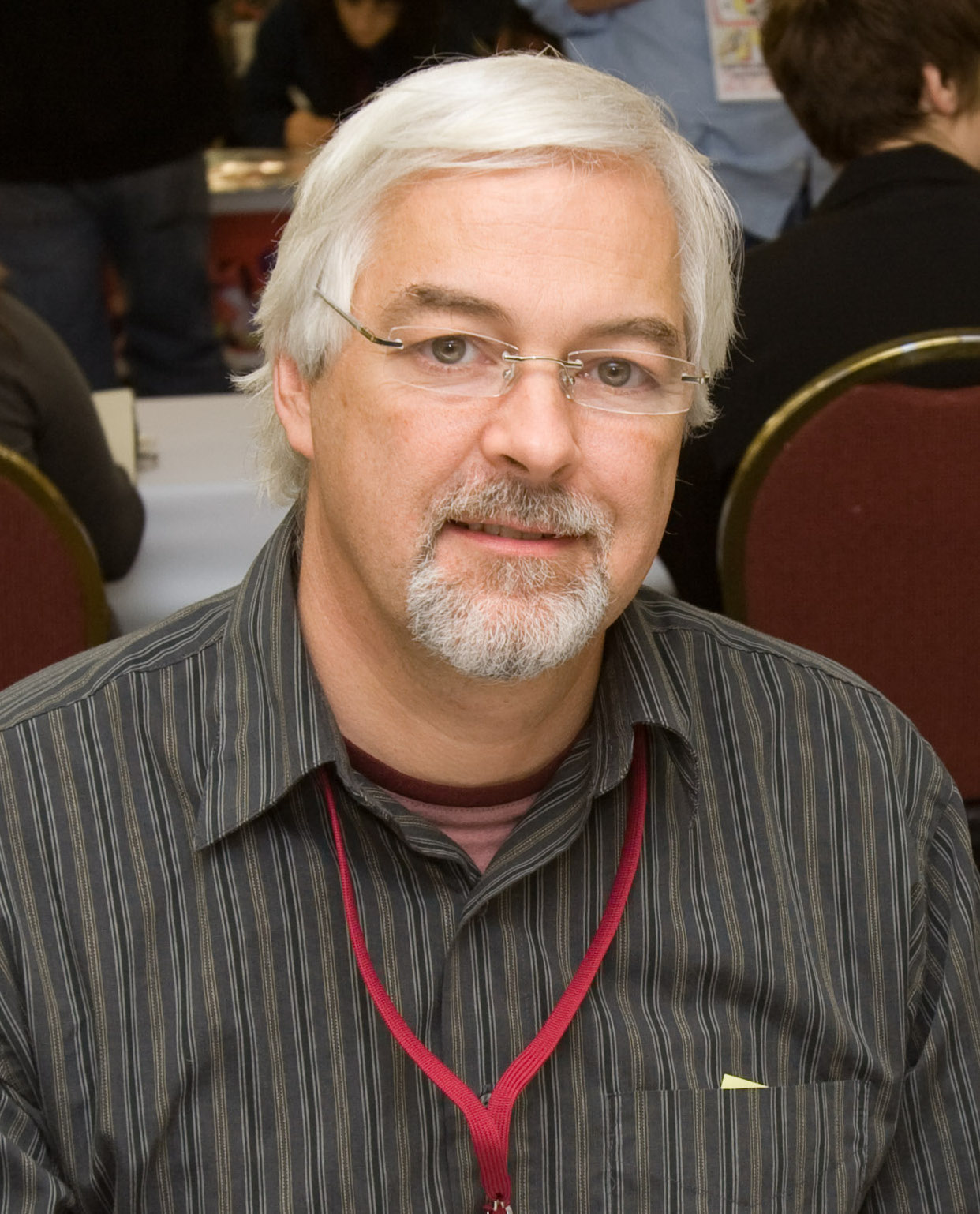
- Ron Randall at Stumptown Comics Fest 2007
- Born: November 22, 1956 (age 70)
- Areas: Writer, Penciller, Inker
- Notable works: Trekker; Arak, Son of Thunder; Justice League International; The Warlord

Ron Randall (born November 22, 1956) is an American comic book artist best known as the creator of the character Trekker.

== Career ==
A graduate of The Kubert School, Ron Randall's first published comic book work was a two-page backup story titled "Killers Above -- Killers Below!" which was written by Robert Kanigher and appeared in Unknown Soldier #243 (September 1980). Randall then drew several stories for the Sgt. Rock title with Joe Kubert, as well as for many of DC's mystery titles. He and writer Gary Cohn co-created the "Barren Earth" feature as a backup in The Warlord #63 (November 1982) and it was spun off into a four-issue limited series in 1985. Randall became the artist on the Arak, Son of Thunder series with issue #26 (October 1983). He collaborated with writer Greg Potter on the "Me & Joe Priest" graphic novel and drew a few issues of Alan Moore's Swamp Thing run. Randall introduced his creation Trekker, a 23rd-century female bounty hunter named Mercy St. Clair, in Dark Horse Presents #4 (January 1987). The character is not named for fans of the Star Trek franchise.

Randall illustrated the Endless Quest book Conan the Outlaw (1984) and the Dungeons & Dragons adventures To Find a King (1985) and The Bane of Llywelyn (1985).

In 1992, he and writer Gerard Jones became the creative team on the Justice League Europe title.

He is a member of Periscope Studio in Portland, Oregon. In September 2011, Randall launched Trekkercomic.com, a website collecting all of the previously published Trekker material. Upon completion of the posting of older material, Randall began to present new Trekker stories on the site. Trekker appeared in print again beginning with the story "The Train to Avalon Bay Part 1" in Dark Horse Presents vol. 2 #24 published in May 2013. The Trekker Omnibus collecting the character's appearances was published by Dark Horse in August 2013.

In 2012, Randall was commissioned by H&R Block to illustrate the tax liabilities of Batman and Spider-Man.

== Bibliography ==
=== CrossGen ===
- Brian Pulido's Lady Death: A Medieval Tale #9 (2003)
- R.A. Salvatore's DemonWars: Eye for an Eye #5 (2003)

=== Crystal Productions ===
- Silence & Co. (2013)

=== Dark Horse Comics ===
- Aliens #6 (1989)
- The American #4 (1988)
- Dark Horse Presents #3–6, 20–22, 39–41, 135–136, Annual 1998 (1986–1998)
- Dark Horse Presents vol. 2 #24 (2013)
- A Decade of Dark Horse #2 (1996)
- Godzilla, King of the Monsters Special #1 (1987)
- Predator #3–4 (1989–1990)
- Predator Cold War #2, 4 (1991)
- Predator: Dark River #1 (1996)
- The Real Adventures of Jonny Quest #5, 8 (1997)
- Star Wars: Shadows of the Empire - Evolution #1–5 (1998)
- Trekker #1–5 (1987–1988)
- The World Below #1–4 (1999)

=== DC Comics ===
- Action Comics #566, 848–849 (1985, 2007)
- Advanced Dungeons and Dragons #8 (1989)
- Arak, Son of Thunder #26–30, 32–36, Annual #1 (1983–1984)
- Batman #360 (1983)
- Batman Allies Secret Files and Origins 2005 #1 (2005)
- Batman and the Outsiders #21 (1985)
- Batman and the Outsiders vol. 2 #40 (2011)
- Catwoman #82 (2000)
- Conqueror of the Barren Earth #1–4 (1985)
- DC Graphic Novel #5 ("Me & Joe Priest") (1985)
- DC Retroactive: JLA - The '80s #1 (2011)
- Detective Comics #523–525 (Green Arrow back-up feature) (1983)
- Doom Patrol vol. 5 #8–15, 17–22 (2010–2011)
- Dragonlance #1–13, 16–19, 22–27, 30–32 (1988–1991)
- Firestorm, the Nuclear Man vol. 3 #34 (2007)
- Green Lantern / Firestorm #1 (2000)
- Hawkman #46 (2006)
- Hawkman Special #1 (1986)
- House of Mystery #296, 317–320 (1981–1983)
- Joker: Last Laugh #5 (2001)
- Joker: Last Laugh Secret Files #1 (2001)
- Justice League Europe #37–50, Annual #3 (1992–1993)
- Justice League International vol. 2 #51–56, 58–60 (1993–1994)
- Justice League Spectacular #1 (1992)
- Omega Men #35 (1986)
- Outsiders vol. 3 #39–43, 48–50 (2006–2007)
- Saga of the Swamp Thing #33 (1985)
- Sgt. Rock #348, 353–355, 357–361, 364, 366, 368, 370–371, 403 (1981–1985)
- Smallville #5 (2004)
- Supergirl vol. 5 #28–29, 33 (2008)
- Superman/Batman #32 (2007)
- Superman Returns: The Official Movie Adaptation #1 (2006)
- Superman: World of New Krypton #8–12 (2009–2010)
- Swamp Thing #42–44, 47, Annual #4 (1985–1988)
- Talent Showcase #16 (1985)
- Tales of the Teen Titans #55 (1985)
- Unknown Soldier #243 (1980)
- The Warlord #63–65, 67–70, 72–74, 76–88, 93, 104–119 (1982–1987)
- Weird War Tales #109 (1982)
- Who's Who in Star Trek #1 (1987)
- Who's Who: The Definitive Directory of the DC Universe #2, 6, 14, 19 (1985–1986)
- Who's Who: Update '87 #5 (1987)
- Wonder Woman vol. 2 #218 (2005)
- Wonder Woman vol. 3 #16–17 (2008)

==== Paradox Press ====
- The Big Book of the Weird Wild West (1998)

==== Vertigo ====
- Astro City vol. 3 #35–36 (2016)
- The Crusades #6, 8–9, 13–14, 19–20 (2001–2002)
- The Dreaming #40, 42, 44–49, 52–55, 57–60 (1999–2001)
- Fables #113 (2012)
- Proposition Player #2–6 (2000)
- The Witching #1–4 (2004)

=== Eclipse Comics ===
- Airboy #14–15, 19–24, 27–32 (1987)
- Scout #10 (1986)

=== Marvel Comics ===
- Deadpool #46–48 (2000)
- Idol #1–3 (1992)
- A Shadowline Saga: Critical Mass #3 (1990)
- Solo #1–4 (1994)
- The Spectacular Spider-Man Annual #4 (1984)
- Spider-Man #50 (1994)
- Star Trek Unlimited #1–8, 10 (1996–1998)
- Thunderbolts #100 (2006)
- Thunderbolts '97 #1 (1997)
- Ultimate Marvel Team-Up #10 (2002)
- Universe X: Beasts #1 (2001)
- Universe X: Cap #1 (2001)
- Venom: Separation Anxiety #1–4 (1994–1995)
- What If? vol. 2 #60, 62 (1994)
- Wonder Man #28–29 (1993–1994)
- X-Men: Alterniverse Visions #1 (1996)

Preceded by Adrian Gonzales	Arak, Son of Thunder penciller 1983–1984	Succeeded by Ernie Colón
Preceded by Jerry Bingham	The Warlord penciller 1986–1987	Succeeded by Art Thibert
Preceded by Chris Wozniak	Justice League Europe / Justice League International penciller 1992–1994	Succeeded by Chuck Wojtkiewicz
