= List of people from Park Ridge, Illinois =

Park Ridge
- The City of Park Ridge, Illinois
- Location within Illinois Location within the United States
- Coordinates: 42°0′43″N 87°50′30″W

Park Ridge, Illinois, is a suburb of Chicago. Located 15 miles (24 km) northwest of downtown Chicago, it has a population of 37,775. Despite its relative small city status, Park Ridge has been home to several notable people. Among the most admired women in the world, former first lady, U.S. Senator, U.S. Secretary of State, and 2016 Democratic presidential nominee Hillary Rodham Clinton grew up in Park Ridge and graduated from Maine South High School. Actor Harrison Ford, the star of Indiana Jones, Star Wars, and The Fugitive also attended high school in Park Ridge. Ford's films have grossed over $3.5 billion domestically, making him the third-highest-grossing U.S. domestic box office star of all time. Two-time Super Bowl champion (XVII, XXII) Dave Butz and Hall of Fame third baseman Ron Santo, 1st baseman Detroit Tigers, 1984 World Series Champion Dave Bergman all grew up in Park Ridge. Major League Baseball players Adam Rosales and Luke Gregerson are from Park Ridge, and Hall of Fame catcher Gabby Hartnett moved to Park Ridge later in life. More recognized by his work than by name, Park Ridge resident Grant Wood painted American Gothic, one of the most familiar images in 20th-century American art.

The following list includes notable people who were born or have lived in Park Ridge, Illinois. For a similar list organized alphabetically by last name, see the category page People from Park Ridge, Illinois.

== Academics and engineering ==
Name	Image	Birth	Death	Known for	Association	Reference
Susan Lindquist		June 5, 1949	October 27, 2016	Molecular biologist; biology professor at Massachusetts Institute of Technology and Director of the Whitehead Institute	Born in Park Ridge and attended Maine South High School	
Vincent A. Mahler		November 26, 1949		Political science professor; Undergraduate Program Director at Loyola University Chicago	Lived in Park Ridge	
Ray Ozzie		November 20, 1955		Chief software architect for Microsoft	Maine South High School alum (1973)	

== Fine arts ==
Name	Image	Birth	Death	Known for	Association	Reference
John W. Carroll		December 30, 1946		Art photographer	Grew up in Park Ridge	
Dulah Marie Evans		February 17, 1875	July 24, 1951	Artist specializing in the American Southwest; nicknamed "The Park Ridge Modernist"; married to Albert Henry Krehbiel	Lived in Park Ridge	
Alfonso Iannelli		February 17, 1888	March 23, 1965	Artist, architect, Prairie School sculptor and designer; primary designer of the Pickwick Theater	Co-founder of Iannelli Studios in Park Ridge	
Albert Henry Krehbiel		November 25, 1873	June 29, 1945	Art teacher; impressionist painter and muralist; married to Dulah Marie Evans	Lived in Park Ridge	
Scott Mutter		1944	2008	Photographer specializing in photomontage	Born and died in Park Ridge	
Richard Nickel		May 31, 1928	April 13, 1972	Photographer and art preservationist focusing on the architecture of Louis Sullivan	Lived in Park Ridge	
John Paulding		April 5, 1883	1935	Sculptor	Lived in Park Ridge	
Frederick Richardson		1862	January 15, 1937	Illustrator and art teacher	Lived in Park Ridge	
Grant Wood		February 13, 1891	February 12, 1942	Painter (American Gothic)	Lived in Park Ridge	

=== Art by local artists ===
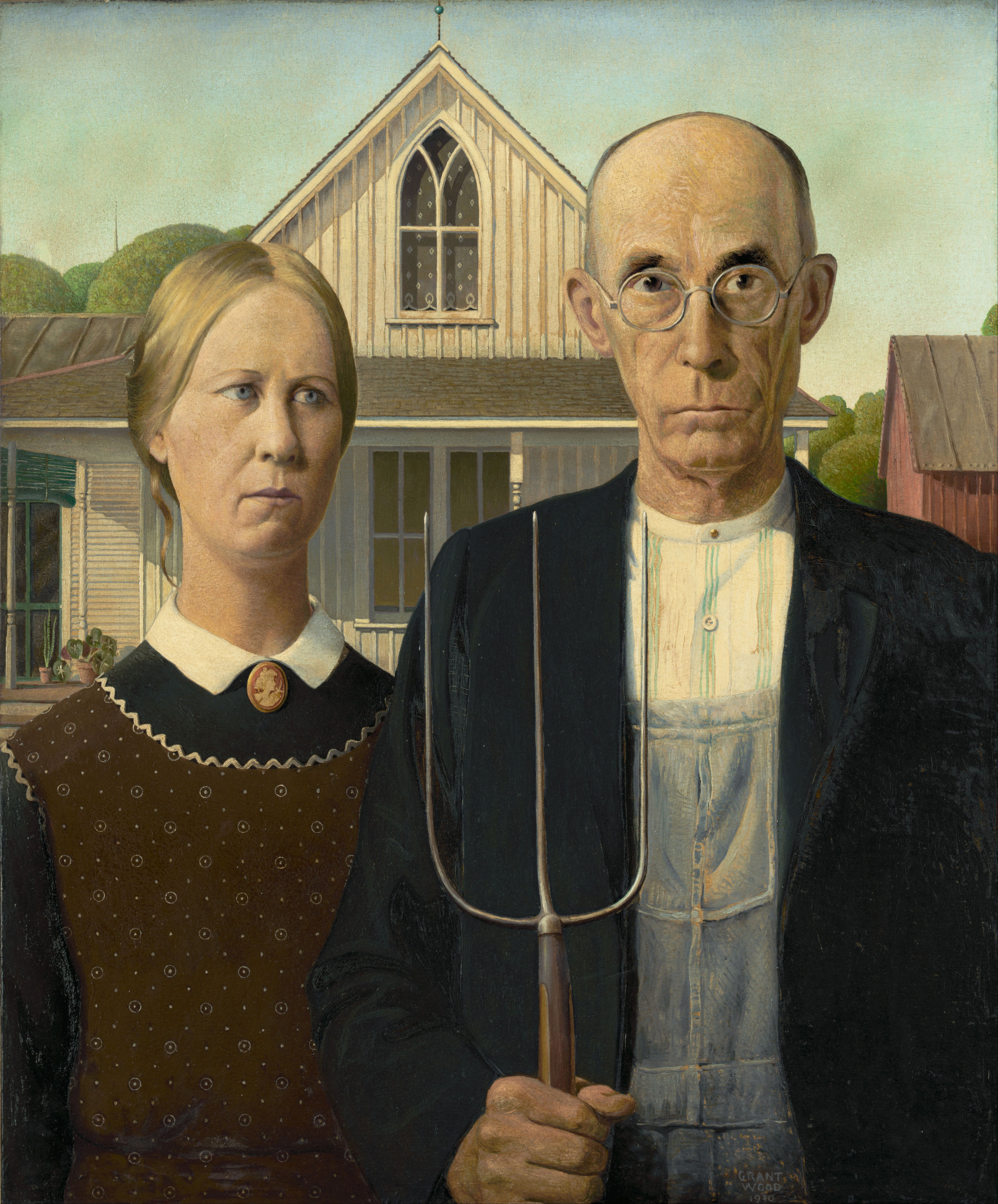
American Gothic by Grant Wood; one of the most familiar images in 20th-century American art.

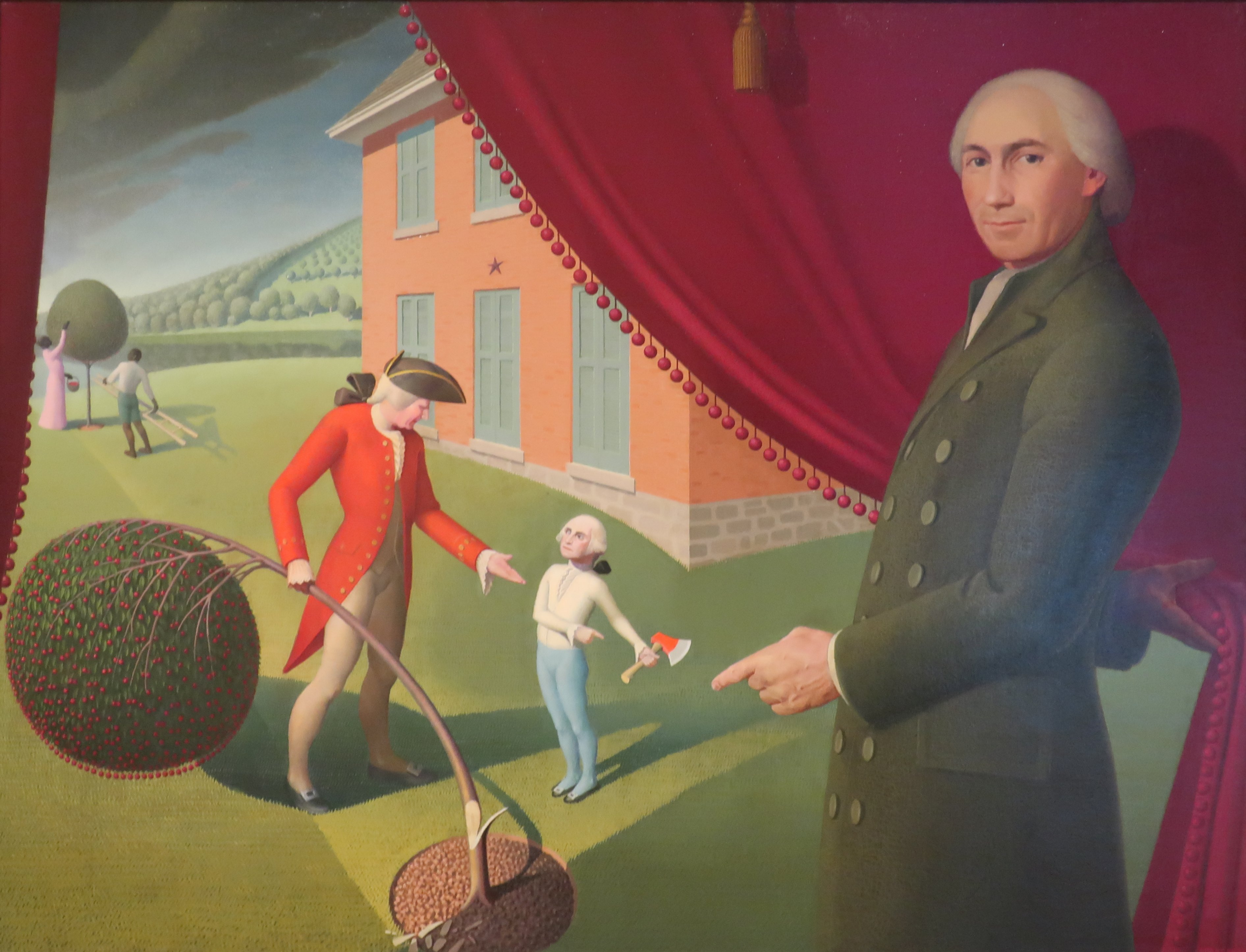
Parson Weems’ Fable by Grant Wood; depicting both Weems and his fable about George Washington and the "Cherry Tree".

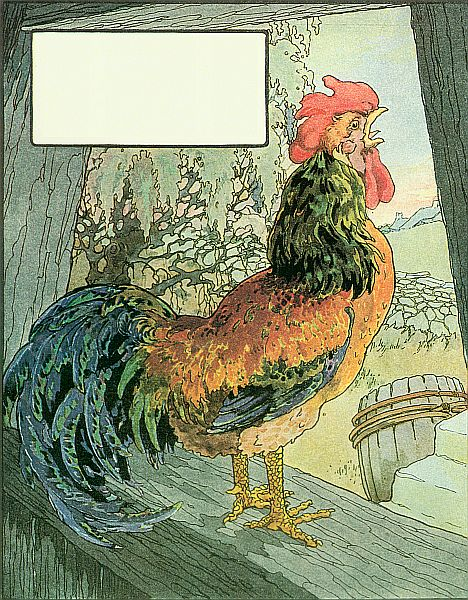
A rooster by Frederick Richardson from the Volland edition of Mother Goose.

Sculpture entitled Over the Top by John Paulding in Bolton Landing, New York.

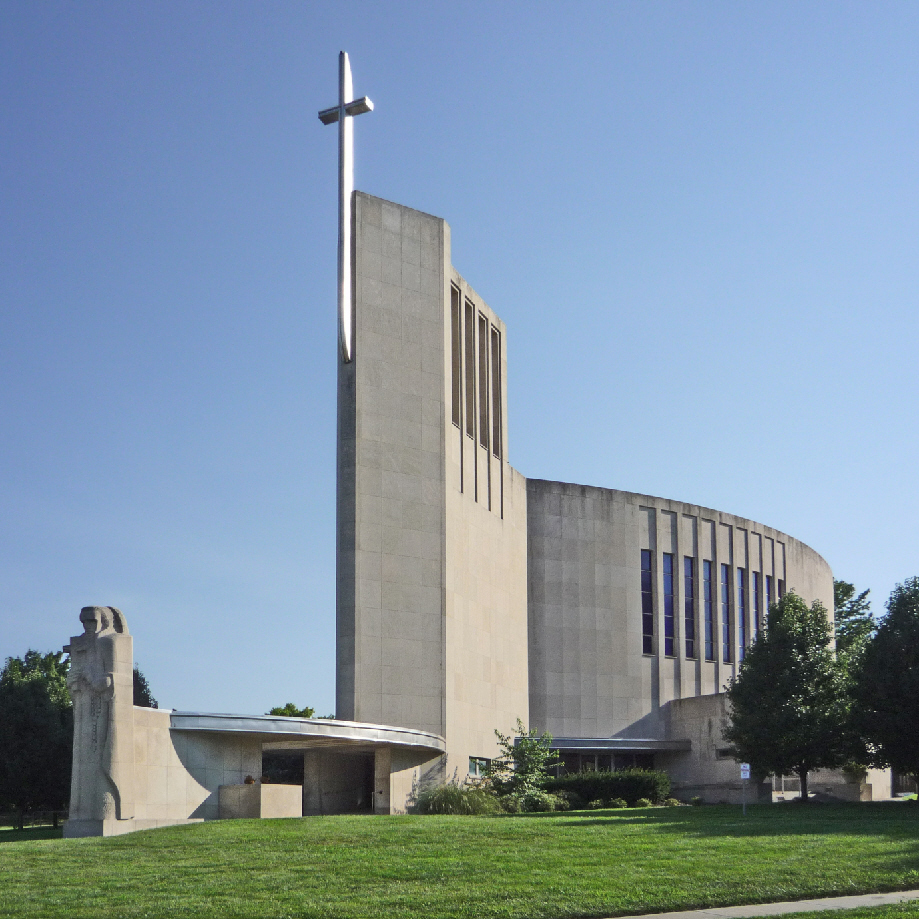
Church of Saint Francis Xavier in Kansas City, Missouri, designed by architect Barry Byrne.

== Media and literature ==
Name	Image	Birth	Death	Known for	Association	Reference
Greg Glienna		August 23, 1963		Director and screenwriter (Meet the Parents, A Guy Thing, Relative Strangers)	Grew up in Park Ridge	
Rich Koz		March 12, 1952		Horror movie host Svengoolie	Maine East High School Alum	
Frank Merle				Film director and screenwriter (The Employer)	Grew up in Park Ridge, Maine South High School alum	
Mike North		1952		Sports radio personality	Lived in Park Ridge	
Marshall Seese				20-year meteorologist for The Weather Channel and 8-year host of Your Weather Today	Native of Park Ridge	
Janet Shamlian		May 14, 1962		National correspondent for NBC News	Born and raised in Park Ridge, Maine South High School alum	
Christopher Storer		1980 or 1981		Screenwriter, director, and producer (The Bear)	Raised in Park Ridge, Maine South High School alum	
Steve Wilkos		March 9, 1964		Talk show host (The Steve Wilkos Show); ex-security and co-host (The Jerry Springer Show)	Lived in Park Ridge	

== Performing arts ==
=== Acting ===
Name	Image	Birth	Death	Known for	Association	Reference
Sean Giambrone		May 30, 1999		Child actor (Adam Goldberg in The Goldbergs)	Grew up in Park Ridge, Maine South High School alum	
Karen Black		July 1, 1939	August 8, 2013	Actress (Easy Rider, The Great Gatsby, Family Plot); two-time Golden Globe winner (1970, 1974)	Born in Park Ridge	
Gary Cole		September 20, 1956		Actor (The Brady Bunch Movie, Office Space, Talladega Nights: The Ballad of Ricky Bobby, Veep)	Born in Park Ridge	
Ali Ewoldt		October 6, 1990		Broadway actress (Les Misérables, 2006)	Lived in Park Ridge	
Harrison Ford		July 13, 1942		Actor (Blade Runner, Indiana Jones, Star Wars, The Fugitive)	Maine East High School alum	
Dave Mallow		October 19, 1948		Voiceover artist (Digimon, Mighty Morphin' Power Rangers, Call of Duty: Black Ops, World of Warcraft)	Born in Park Ridge; Maine South High School alum	
John Pankow		April 28, 1954		Film and stage actor (Mad About You)	Grew up in Park Ridge	
Carrie Snodgress		October 27, 1945	April 1, 2004	Actress (Diary of a Mad Housewife); two-time Golden Globe winner (1970, 1971)	Born in Park Ridge	
Perry Caravello		November 17, 1963		Actor (Windy City Heat)	Born in Park Ridge	

=== Dancing ===
Name	Image	Birth	Death	Known for	Association	Reference
Ann Carlson		October 21, 1954		Dancer and choreographer	Born in Park Ridge	

=== Music ===
Name	Image	Birth	Death	Known for	Association	Reference
Ted Ansani				Bass player and back-up vocalist for the 1985–1996 pop band Material Issue	Lived in Park Ridge	
Leon Berry		July 2, 1914	August 23, 1996	American organist	Lived in Park Ridge	
John Alden Carpenter		February 28, 1876	April 26, 1951	Composer (Adventures in a Perambulator and The Song of Faith)	Born in Park Ridge	
Adam Jones		January 15, 1965		Guitar player for the alternative metal band Tool	Born in Park Ridge	
James Pankow		August 20, 1947		Founding member of the rock band Chicago	Lived in Park Ridge	
Shana Petrone		May 8, 1972		Singer ("I Want You")	Born in Park Ridge	
Dougie Thomson		March 24, 1951		Bassist for Supertramp; manager of Disturbed and Dark New Day	Lived in Park Ridge	

== Politics and law ==
Name	Image	Birth	Death	Known for	Association	Reference
William P. Black		November 11, 1842	January 3, 1916	Lawyer; defended the anarchists accused of starting the Haymarket Riot; Union Army veteran and Medal of Honor recipient	Lived in Park Ridge	
John W. Carroll		1901	September 8, 1993	State politician and local newspaper owner	Settled in Park Ridge	
Hillary Clinton		October 26, 1947		First Lady of the United States, senator from New York, 67th U.S. Secretary of State and 2016 Democratic Party candidate for President of the United States	Lived in Park Ridge, Maine South High School alum	
Dorothy Howell Rodham		June 4, 1919	November 1, 2011	Mother of Hillary Clinton	Lived in Park Ridge	
Hugh E. Rodham		April 2, 1911	April 7, 1993	Father of Hillary Clinton	Lived in Park Ridge	
Hugh Edwin Rodham		May 26, 1950		Younger brother of Hillary Clinton	Lived in Park Ridge, Maine South High School alum	
Tony Rodham		1954		Youngest brother of Hillary Clinton	Lived in Park Ridge, Maine South High School alum	
William Eich				Chief judge of the Wisconsin Court of Appeals	Born in Park Ridge	
Randy Hultgren		March 1, 1966		US representative for Illinois's 14th congressional district	Born in Park Ridge	
Dan Kotowski		March 24, 1967		Illinois state senator	Lived in Park Ridge	
Robert W. Kustra		March 21, 1943		State senator and the 43rd lieutenant governor of Illinois	Lived in Park Ridge	
Dave Sullivan		December 29, 1964		Illinois state senator	Lived in Park Ridge	

== Sports ==
=== Baseball ===
Name	Image	Birth	Death	Known for	Association	Reference
Peter Bourjos		March 31, 1987		Outfielder for the Tampa Bay Rays	Born in Park Ridge	
Luke Gregerson		May 14, 1984		Relief pitcher for the St.Louis Cardinals	Born in Park Ridge	
Gabby Hartnett		December 20, 1900	December 20, 1972	Hall of Fame catcher for the Chicago Cubs and New York Giants	Lived and died in Park Ridge	
Gene Rye		November 15, 1906	January 21, 1980	Only baseball player to hit three home runs in an inning.	Lived and died in Park Ridge	
Jim Hendry		July 27, 1955		General manager of the Chicago Cubs	Lived in Park Ridge	
Al Levine		May 22, 1968		Relief pitcher for seven Major League Baseball teams	Born in Park Ridge	
Adam Rosales		May 20, 1983		Infielder for six MLB teams	Born in Park Ridge	
Ron Santo		February 25, 1940	December 3, 2010	Hall of Fame third baseman for the Chicago Cubs and Chicago White Sox	Owner of Santo's Pizzeria in Park Ridge	
Luke Williams		August 9, 1996		MLB player	Born in Park Ridge	

=== Basketball ===
Name	Image	Birth	Death	Known for	Association	Reference
Colin Falls		June 9, 1985		Shooting guard for Notre Dame and Orlandina Basket (Italian First Division)	Born in Park Ridge	

=== Football ===
Name	Image	Birth	Death	Known for	Association	Reference
Dave Butz		June 23, 1950	November 4, 2022	Defensive end and tackle for Washington Redskins; two-time Super Bowl champion (XVII, XXII)	Maine South High School alum	
Jeff Francis		July 7, 1966		Quarterback for Los Angeles Raiders and Cleveland Browns	Born in Park Ridge	
Chris Perez		June 21, 1969		Offensive tackle in NFL and CFL	Born in Park Ridge	

=== Hockey ===
Name	Image	Birth	Death	Known for	Association	Reference
Craig Anderson		May 21, 1981		Goaltender for the Buffalo Sabres, Washington Capitals, Ottawa Senators, Chicago Blackhawks, Florida Panthers, and Colorado Avalanche	Born in Park Ridge	
Jeff Rohlicek		January 27, 1966		Centre for the Vancouver Canucks	Born in Park Ridge	

=== Ice skating ===
Name	Image	Birth	Death	Known for	Association	Reference
Maria-Elena Papasotiriou		January 27, 1990		Figure skater; Greek national champion	Born in Park Ridge	
David Santee		July 22, 1957		Olympic figure skater and judge; competed in the 1976 and 1980 Olympics	Lived in Park Ridge	
Deanna Stellato		June 22, 1983		Champion figure skater	Born in Park Ridge	
Nancy Swider-Peltz		August 20, 1956		Olympic speed skater; set the 3,000 meters world record in 1976	Maine South High School alum	

=== Rowing ===
Name	Image	Birth	Death	Known for	Association	Reference
Sarah Zelenka		June 8, 1987		Competitor at the 2012 Summer Olympics; gold medalist at the 2011 World Rowing Championships	Born in Park Ridge	

=== Soccer ===
Name	Image	Birth	Death	Known for	Association	Reference
Roberto Albuquerque		November 4, 1993		Defender	Born in Park Ridge	
Adam Wolanin		November 13, 1919	October 26, 1987	Forward for the US national soccer team at the 1950 FIFA World Cup	Lived and died in Park Ridge	

=== Volleyball ===
Name	Image	Birth	Death	Known for	Association	Reference
Thomas Hoff		June 9, 1973		Team captain of the US Olympic men's volleyball team; gold medalist (2008)	Maine South High School alum (1991)	
