= The Life and Adventures of Santa Claus (disambiguation) =

The Life and Adventures of Santa Claus is a 1902 children's book written by L. Frank Baum.

Baum's story has twice been adapted for the screen:

- The Life and Adventures of Santa Claus (1985 film), stop motion animated television feature by Rankin/Bass Productions
- The Life & Adventures of Santa Claus (2000 film), animated fantasy released by Universal Studios Home Entertainment
