= Clause (disambiguation) =

A clause is a type of construct in grammar.

Clause may also refer to:

- Clause (logic), a disjunction of literals in logic
- Clause, a constituent component of statements and queries in SQL
- Legal clause, an individually designated provision in a contract, regulation or statute

== People ==
- Frederick Clause (1791–1852), surgeon, painter and early explorer of Western Australia
- Marcel Clause (1927–2004), Belgian judo educator, referee, former athlete, former coach
- William Lionel Clause (1887–1946), English artist

== See also ==
- Santa Claus (disambiguation)
