= Santa Claus (disambiguation) =

Santa Claus is a folkloric figure in many Western cultures associated with Christmas.

Santa Claus may also refer to:

== Entertainment ==
- Santa Claus: A Morality, a 1946 play by E. E. Cummings
- Santa Claus (1898 film), a British short silent drama
- Santa Claus (1912 film), a British fantasy silent film
- Santa Claus (1959 film), a Mexican film
- Santa Claus: The Movie, a 1985 Alexander Salkind film
- The Santa Clause (franchise), a series of films and a limited series starring Tim Allen
  - The Santa Clause, a 1994 film
  - The Santa Clause 2, a 2002 sequel to the 1994 film
  - The Santa Clause 3: The Escape Clause, a 2006 sequel to the 2002 film
  - The Santa Clauses, a 2022 limited TV series
- "Santa Claus" (Roseanne), a 1991 television episode
- Santa Claus, a fictional character in the anime and manga series Chainsaw Man

== Places in the United States ==
- Santa Claus, Arizona, an uninhabited desert town
- Santa Claus, Georgia, a city
- Santa Claus, Indiana, a town

== Sports ==
- FC Santa Claus, a Finnish football club
- Santa Claus (horse) (1961–1970), Irish racehorse
- Santa Claus Cup, an annual international figure skating competition organized by the Hungarian National Skating Federation

== Other uses ==
- Santa Claus (politician), American politician
- Santa Claus (steamboat), a passenger-cargo steamboat built in 1845 for service on New York's Hudson River
- Santa Claus (clipper), an American clipper ship
- Santa Claus (horse), a Thoroughbred racehorse
- Santa Claus (sculpture), a 2001 statue by Paul McCarthy

== See also ==
- Christmas gift-bringer
  - List of Christmas and winter gift-bringers by country
    - Amu Nowruz, Iranian
    - Ded Moroz, Slavic
    - Father Christmas, English
    - Joulupukki, Finnish
    - Julemanden, Danish
    - Jultomten, Swedish
    - Mikulás, Hungarian
    - Olentzero, Basque
    - Père Noël, French
    - Sinterklaas, Dutch
- Father Christmas (disambiguation)
- Santa claws (disambiguation)
- Santa (disambiguation)
- The Life and Adventures of Santa Claus (disambiguation)
- Xanta Klaus, stage name for professional wrestler Balls Mahoney (1972–2016)
