= Middleton, Lancashire =

Village in Lancashire, England

Coordinates: 54.021°N 2.881°W

Middleton
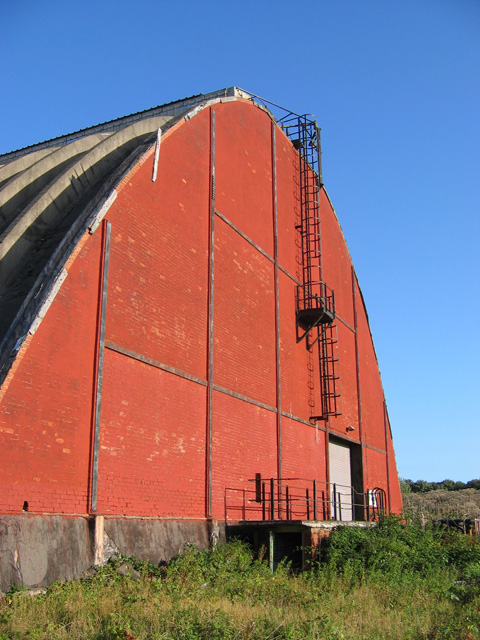
- Silo at Middleton Industrial Estate

- Location in the City of Lancaster district Location within Lancashire
- Population: 810 (2021)
- OS grid reference: SD423587
- Civil parish: Middleton
- District: Lancaster
- Shire county: Lancashire
- Region: North West
- Country: England
- Sovereign state: United Kingdom
- Post town: MORECAMBE
- Postcode district: LA3
- Dialling code: 01524
- Police: Lancashire
- Fire: Lancashire
- Ambulance: North West
- UK Parliament: Morecambe and Lunesdale

Middleton is a village and civil parish in the City of Lancaster in Lancashire, England, between Heysham and Overton. It had a population of 810 in the 2021 Census.

== History ==
Middleton was the location of Middleton Tower Holiday Camp, which opened in 1939. The camp was owned by Pontin's from July 1955 until its closure in October 1994. By 2008, the holiday camp had been redeveloped as a gated community with bungalows and flats.

On Thursday 29 August 1974 37 year old linesman Patric David Brady, of Stockton-on-Tees, fell 175 ft off a pylon, and was killed, working for J. L. Eve Construction.

== Transport ==
Buses are run by Stagecoach on 1 route. The 5 to Carnforth or Overton. The 1/1A also extend during peak times to Overton or to the Lancaster/Uni.

== Notable villagers ==
- William Lionel Clause, landscape artist (born at Middleton, 1887)

== See also ==
- Listed buildings in Middleton, Lancashire
