= The Life and Adventures of Santa Claus (1985 film) =

- Official logo
- Genre: Fantasy; Family
- Based on: The Life and Adventures of Santa Claus by L. Frank Baum
- Written by: Julian P. Gardner
- Directed by: Jules Bass; Arthur Rankin Jr.
- Starring: J.D. Roth; Earl Hammond; Alfred Drake; Lesley Miller; Bob McFadden; Earle Hyman
- Music by: Bernard Hoffer
- Countries of origin: United States; Japan
- Original language: English

Production
- Producers: Jules Bass; Arthur Rankin Jr.
- Cinematography: Akikazu Kono
- Running time: 50 minutes
- Production companies: Rankin/Bass Productions; Pacific Animation Corporation

Original release
- Network: CBS
- Release: December 17, 1985

The Life and Adventures of Santa Claus is a 1985 stop motion animated Christmas television special. It was produced by Rankin/Bass Productions, based on the 1902 children's book The Life and Adventures of Santa Claus by L. Frank Baum, the writer of The Wonderful Wizard of Oz. The special first aired December 17, 1985 on CBS in the United States. This was Rankin/Bass's final "Animagic" stop motion production with later releases including traditional animation. Notably, this special was an adaptation of a novel and is not connected to the continuity created by previous Rankin/Bass Productions.

== Plot ==
Long ago in the Forest of Burzee, a council meeting is held where the Great Ak tells the story of Santa Claus to the leaders of the Immortals, hoping to persuade them to grant Claus immortality. About 60 years earlier, the Great Ak finds an abandoned baby in the snowy woods on the border of the Forest. He gives it to the lioness Shiegra to raise. However, after hearing about the discovery of the infant, Necile, a Wood Nymph, steals him from Shiegra and goes to the Great Ak, begging him to let her raise the child. After initial concern that a human was brought into the Forest which is against the law, the Great Ak allows Necile to raise the child while Shiegra stays to protect them. Necile names the child "Claus".

When Claus has grown to be a young man, the Great Ak takes him to see the mortal world and its cruelty and suffering. Claus learns that he must live there and make it better. He leaves the Forest and lives in a workshop in the Laughing Valley of Hohaho with Shiegra and Tingler, a Sound Imp. As he gets older, he works to bring happiness to children in a nearby village. He eventually makes toys (the first being a wooden black cat modeled after the kitten Blinky that Necile sent to them, which he gives to the orphan boy Weekum). He is occasionally assisted by a group of Ryls, Knooks, and Wood Nymphs from the Forest.

Meanwhile, evil creatures called the Awgwas (who influence children to do bad things and who are led by King Awgwa) are not happy with Claus's efforts to bring happiness to children, so they attempt to stop Claus from making and delivering toys. At first, they send a warning to Claus, telling him to stop or they would come for him. After Claus ignores the warning, the Awgwas kidnap him, but he calls for aid from the Knooks, who help him escape. As he and his friends make attempts to deliver toys to the village, the Awgwas repeatedly ambush them and steal the toys. Claus tries to go alone by night, but he is again ambushed.

The Great Ak has had enough of this and summons King Awgwa and his followers to come and face him. King Awgwa defies the Great Ak's demand that he stop interfering with Claus's efforts and declares war on the Immortals. Later, the Great Ak and some other Immortals face off against the Awgwas and some monstrous friends that they brought. The monsters attack the Immortals, but the Immortals defeat them. The Immortals then charge toward the Awgwas, who flee in fear. Afterwards, the Great Ak informs Claus that he can resume his toy delivering without fear of interference, because the Awgwas "have perished".

Claus and his friends prepare a sleigh to deliver toys to the village, but it is too heavy for them to pull. Peter Knook comes up with the idea of hitching reindeer from the Forest to the sleigh in order to pull it. Claus travels across the valley in his sleigh along with Tingler and Shiegra. The sleigh makes multiple large leaps which Tingler says is like flying. Claus claims that he now knows why the valley is named the way it is, as he laughs in a "ho ho ho" manner. When he makes his first stop, he finds that the door of the house is locked since it is night, so he enters through the chimney. Once inside, he finds that the children's stockings were hung by the fireplace to dry, so he decides to put small toys in them while placing larger toys elsewhere. After Claus leaves and the family wakes up, they refer to him as "Saint Claus" or "Santa Claus". Once Claus returns, Peter Knook informs him that he can only use the reindeer once a year on Christmas Eve. Christmas Eve is only ten days away, so he will not have time to make enough toys. In order for Claus to have enough gifts, Peter Knook finds and retrieves the toys stolen by the Awgwas. Claus sets out on his first of many Christmas Eve sleigh rides.

As Claus nears the end of his life, he suggests that his friends remember him by decorating a tree every year. After hearing about Claus's life and good deeds, the council unanimously votes to give him the Mantle of Immortality. Having become known as "Santa Claus", he delivers gifts to children every Christmas Eve.

== Voice cast ==
Official home release cover artwork for the television special.

- Earl Hammond - Santa Claus
- Earle Hyman - King Awgwa
- Larry Kenney - The Commander of the Wind Demons
- Lynne Lipton - Queen Zurline
- Robert McFadden - Tingler
- Lesley Miller - Necile
- Peter Newman - Peter Knook
- Joey Grasso - Weekum
- J.D. Roth - Young Santa Claus
- Alfred Drake - The Great Ak

=== Children ===
- Amy Anzelowitz
- Josh Blake
- Ari Gold
- Jamie Lisa Murphy

=== Chorus ===
- Al Dana
- Margaret Dorn
- Arlene Martell Martin
- Marty Nelson
- David Ragaini
- Robert Ragaini
- Annette Sanders

== Production ==
The Rankin/Bass production truncates much of the story for a one-hour time slot, and simplifies some of the motivations. Peter Knook, a rather crusty but amiable fellow, replaces most of the other Knooks, except the Protector (King) and two strangers, and declares "only on Christmas Eve" for the reindeer without any argument or explanation. One important new character, Tingler the Sound Imp, also accompanies Claus and gives him someone to talk to.

Screenwriter Julian P. Gardner created the song "Big Surprise" as the children at Weekum's orphanage plead to Santa Claus for more toy cats. Other songs include the chorus "Babe in the Woods" and the chant, "Ora e Sempre (Today and Forever)" representing the immortals (written in minor key, it is reprised in major key when Santa Claus receives the mantle). Bernard Hoffer composed the music, and set a quatrain by Baum inspired by Claus's laugh.

Both this and Pinocchio's Christmas are the only Rankin/Bass Christmas specials without a celebrity narrator.

== Reception ==
Its first airing on December 17, 1985, earned a 12.5 rating and a 19 percent audience share, ranking third in its timeslot, and placed in the bottom ten for the week (56th out of 65 shows).

== Home media ==
The Life and Adventures of Santa Claus was released on VHS tape in 1990 and was re-released on September 26, 2000 by Warner Home Video. The special was paired with Nestor, The Long-Eared Christmas Donkey and released on DVD under the Warner Archive brand on November 17, 2009. It would also be included as part of The Complete Rankin Bass Christmas Collection Blu-Ray and DVD set on October 31, 2023.

Warner Bros. continues to hold the distribution rights to the television special. As of 2022 in the United States it can be streamed on the AMC+ subscription streaming service, or on the AMC app to viewers with paid cable and television subscriptions.

== See also ==
- List of animated feature films
- List of Christmas television specials
- List of stop-motion films
- Santa Claus in film
- The Life & Adventures of Santa Claus (2000 film)
