= Georgene Faulkner =

American writer

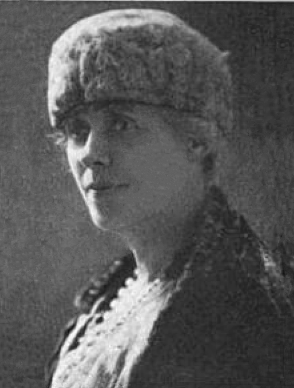
Georgene Faulkner, from a 1922 publication.

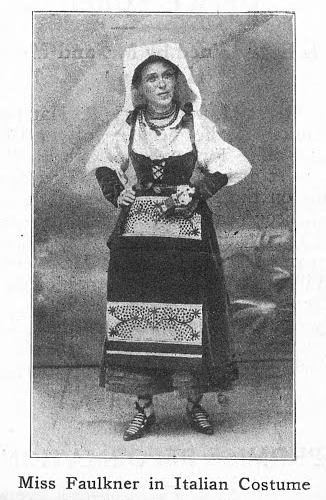
Georgene Faulkner in Italian costume, from a 1911 publication.

Georgene Faulkner (October 6, 1873 in Chicago–1958) was an American writer of children's literature and storyteller of the early twentieth century. In her career, she was known and promoted as "the Story Lady."

A native Chicagoan, she attended the School of Education of the University of Chicago, then at the forefront of educational reform. When her sister Elizabeth Faulkner started the Faulkner School for Girls in 1909, Georgene was in charge of the kindergarten. She was an accomplished storyteller; she dressed up as Mrs. Santa Claus to tell Christmas stories to children. She also practiced her craft with adult audiences: she traveled to Europe to entertain American troops during World War I.

Beginning in 1922, Georgene Faulkner began broadcasting on Chicago radio stations; on stations WMAQ and WGN she had programs titled "The Story Lady" and "Air Castle." She also wrote on children's topics for the Chicago Tribune.

Over the space of four decades she wrote or edited a range of children's books. Several of her works were illustrated by Frederick Richardson. In the final phase of her career she addressed the problem of racial prejudice, in the books Melindy's Medal (with John Becker, 1945) and Melindy's Happy Summer (1949).

== Selected works ==
- Old Russian Tales (1913)
- Italian Fairy Tales (1914)
- Christmas Stories (1916)
- Old English Nursery Tales (1916)
- Red Cross Stories for Children (1917)
- The Story Lady's Book (1921)
- Through Story-Land with the Children (1924)
- Tales of Many Folk (1926)
- The Story Lady's Nursery Tales (1927)
- Story Lady's Christmas Stories (1927)
- Little Peachling, and Other Tales of Old Japan (1928)
- The White Elephant and Other Tales from Old India (1929)
- The Road to Enchantment: Fairy Tales from the World Over (1929)
- The Golden Fish: Fairy Tales from the World Over (1931)
- Melindy's Medal (1945)
- Melindy's Happy Summer (1949)
- Hidden Silver (1952)
