= Santa claws =

Santa claws may refer to:

- Misspelling of Santa Claus
- Sanctacaris (informally Santa Claws), a Middle Cambrian Habellid arthropod
- Santa Claws (1996 film), a 1996 slasher film
- Santa Claws, a 2004 novella by American author MaryJanice Davidson
- Santa Claws, a 2014 direct-to-video Christmas film from The Asylum

== See also ==
- Santa Claus (disambiguation)
