= Belle Silveira =

American artist

- Born: September 21, 1877; Erie, Pennsylvania, United States
- Died: March 25, 1930 (aged 52); New York City, New York, United States
- Notable work: Included Smithsonian American Art Museum and Metropolitan Museum of Art collections
- Spouse: Otto Wenceslas Gorski (m. 1906)

Belle Silveira, also known as Belle Silveira Gorski and Belle Silveira Bradford, (1877–1930) was an American artist.

She was known for her pencil portraits.

== Biography ==
Born in Erie, Pennsylvania on September 21, 1877, Belle Silveira studied with John Vanderpoel at the School of the Art Institute of Chicago. She was also an art student of William Merritt Chase and Frederick Richardson, and was best known for her pencil sketches.

On September 8, 1906, Silveira wed Otto Wenceslas Gorski, a stepson of the renowned Polish pianist, Ignacy Jan Paderewski, and son of Helena Paderewska. The couple reportedly lived in poverty frequently during their first years of marriage.

Silveira, who reportedly was subjected to repeated incidents of domestic violence during her marriage to Gorski, ultimately divorced him. She later remarried an older man, taking his surname of Bradford, but that marriage also ended in divorce.

Sometime during the early 1920s, she relocated to the New York home of her friend, Ralph Modjeski, a former classmate of Paderewski who had become one of the most respected bridge builders in the United States after emigrating from Poland. Modjeski had been the person who had introduced Silveira to Gorski during the early 1900s. According to newspapers in Illinois, Modjeski and Silveira had had a longstanding friendship.

While living at Modjeski's home, Silveira completed a series of drawings of his bridge designs.

=== Exhibitions ===
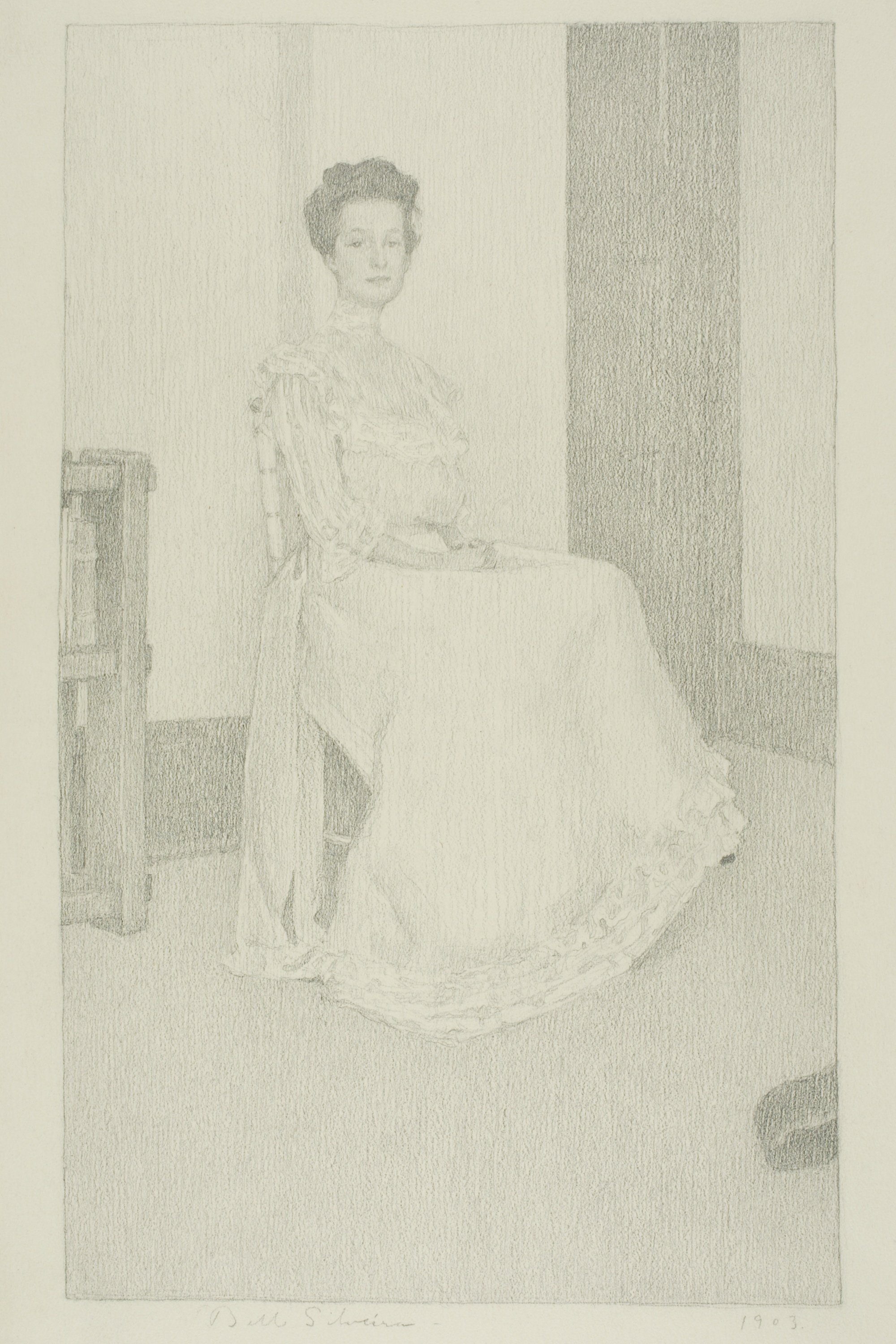
Silveira is famous for graphite portraits such as her work 'Ethel Randolph' from 1903.

Silveira's pencil sketches and sculptures were exhibited during her lifetime as follows:

- December 16–26, 1897: "The Venetian" (graphite sketch), "Laure Elizabeth" (sculpture), and two additional sketches (one graphite, one pencil), Art Students League of Chicago's annual exhibition at the Art Institute of Chicago;
- 1906: Solo exhibition of her drawings, the Art Institute of Chicago;
- January 30 to February 25, 1906: "Michigan Avenue" (pencil sketch) and pencil portraits of the following individuals: Mrs. W. A. Arms, Frank Turner Godfrey and Donald Robertson, Chicago artists exhibition, the Art Institute of Chicago; and
- February 13 to March 30, 1919: "At Aidenn, September 1917" (pencil), "At Aidenn, December 1918" (pencil), "Le Palais de Justice, Paris" (pencil), "Pont Royal, Paris" (pencil), and a pencil portrait of Ralph Clarkson, Chicago artists exhibition, the Art Institute of Chicago.

== Death ==
On Tuesday evening, March 25, 1930, Silveira ended her life by suicide. Her death was documented by New York detectives as having occurred in Modjeski's home.

According to friends, Silveira may have chosen to end her life at the age of fifty-two due to a chronic illness:

"Seven years ago she told me that when her illness—a sort of sleeping sickness caused by tubercular lesions in her back, originally caused by her husband's beatings—became intolerable, she would end her life. She had no religion, and no fear."

Additional news reports stated that Silveira had left a suicide note indicating that she had grown increasingly despondent about her health, and feared that she would be paralyzed due to her medical condition.

== Legacy ==
Silveira's work is included in the collections of the Smithsonian American Art Museum, the Metropolitan Museum of Art, the Art Institute of Chicago, and the National Gallery of Art, Washington.
