= The Life & Adventures of Santa Claus (2000 film) =

- Directed by: Glen Hill; Susan Blu (voice director)
- Written by: Hank Saroyan
- Based on: The Life and Adventures of Santa Claus by L. Frank Baum
- Produced by: Mike Young
- Starring: Hal Holbrook; Dixie Carter; Robby Benson; Jim Cummings
- Music by: Misha Segal
- Production company: Mike Young Productions
- Distributed by: Universal Studios Home Video
- Release date: October 31, 2000
- Running time: 75 minutes

The Life & Adventures of Santa Claus is a 2000 American direct-to-video animated fantasy film created by Mike Young Productions and released by Universal Studios Home Entertainment. It is based on the 1902 L. Frank Baum novel of the same name.

== Plot ==
In the Forest of Burzee, where many immortals live (such as Knooks, fairies, and nymphs), their leader, Ak, the Master Woodsman of the World (governor of all forests), finds a human baby abandoned and places him in the care of the lioness, Shiegra. A wood nymph named Necile thereupon adopts the baby; later named Nicholas. Meanwhile, a shapeshifting pixie named Wisk is catapulted to Burzee over the mountain where the evil Awgwas live. When Nicholas reaches young adulthood, Ak shows him how mortals live, giving him a magic sash that makes him invisible. Nicholas sees that the humans, mostly the children, live cruel and unfair lives, mostly in poverty or child abuse (enforced by the Awgwas). Eventually, Nicholas and Wisk move to a spot near both Necile and the humans. The Knooks build a house for him, and Necile gives him a cat, whom he names Blinky. Nicholas travels to a village, in which he stops a baby from crying, and a girl named Megan talks for the first time. To help the children, Nicholas carves a toy cat of Blinky. One day in winter, Ethan the Cripple, a boy from a village, travels to his house to bring him a leaning stick. He nearly freezes to death, but Nicholas takes him into his house, much to the disappointment of King Mogorb, leader of the Awgwas. When he meets Blinky, Nicholas gives him the toy cat.

Nicholas makes more toys to give to children: mostly cats, and later birds, ponies, and doll figures of Necile. He also carves an image toy of Shiegra who comes to say goodbye to Nicholas as the end of her days on Earth grew near. After giving the children toys and bringing them happiness the Awgwas break into Nicholas's house and send him to another forest but he returns soon after and continues to make toys for the children and his house grows bigger. Eventually, Nicholas ages. A Knook named Will gives him two reindeer, Mistletoe and Holly, to pull a sled so he can travel to the villages in winter, telling him to return before daybreak. For leaving many toys for the children, he becomes known as Saint Nicholas, or Santa Claus. But when he returns after daybreak Will tells him he cannot use the reindeer anymore so while attempting to deliver more toys, Nicholas is attacked by the Awgwas, who steal all his toys. When they later attack Natalie, a princess, coming to see him, he brings this problem to Ak. Ak decides that Nicholas should travel to villages once a year, and that this day should be Christmas, and Will gives him eight reindeer for his sled. Unable to tolerate the Awgwas' misdeeds, Ak and the other immortals decide to finish them once and for all and after a fierce battle they transform them into birds and insects, and retrieve the stolen toys. Every Christmas thereafter, Nicholas makes his trips to the villages, beginning the tradition of Christmas trees by putting some in darker homes, and placing smaller gifts in stockings left up to dry. Some children leave milk and cookies for him, in return. Near the end of Nicholas' days, as the Angel of Death is coming for him, Ak holds an immortals' council, asking to make Nicholas immortal. Bo, Master Mariner of the World (governor of all water), calls for a vote. When the vote is in favor of using the Mantle of Immortality on Santa Claus, Ak tells the Angel of Death not to take him, and places the mantle around him (and Blinky) while he is asleep. Now immortal, Santa Claus, aided by Blinky and Wisk, continues giving people gifts at Christmas; the end showing a Christmas many years in the future.

== Cast ==
- Robby Benson as Young Santa Claus
- Jim Cummings as Old Santa Claus / Thog / Additional Voices
- Dixie Carter as Necile, Santa's adoptive mother.
- Hal Holbrook as Ak, Master Woodsman of the World; Santa's father figure.
- Carlos Alazraqui as Wisk, Santa's best friend / Wil Knook
- Maurice LaMarche as King Mogorb / Lord of Lerd / Additional Voices
- Brianne Siddall as Ethan the Cripple / Megan / Tycus
- Cynthia Songé as Shiegra
- Kath Soucie as Natalie / Mayrie
- Mary Kay Bergman as Martha / Nymph
- Melissa Disney as Gardenia / Village Girl
- Jess Harnell as Wagif Knook / Bo, Master Mariner of the World / Giant / Additional Voices
- Nick Jameson as Peter Knook / Andrew

== See also ==
- The Life and Adventures of Santa Claus (1985 film)
- List of Christmas films
- Santa Claus in film
