= A Kidnapped Santa Claus =

1904 short story by L. Frank Baum

"A Kidnapped Santa Claus" is a Christmas-themed short story by American writer L. Frank Baum; it has been called "one of Baum's most beautiful stories" and constitutes an influential contribution to the mythology of Christmas.

"A Kidnapped Santa Claus" was first published in the December 1904 edition of The Delineator, the women's magazine that would print Baum's Animal Fairy Tales in the following year. The magazine text was "admirably illustrated" with "pen drawings of marked originality" by Frederick Richardson, who would illustrate Baum's Queen Zixi of Ix in 1905.

== Baum's mythology ==
"A Kidnapped Santa Claus" was published two years after Baum's The Life and Adventures of Santa Claus (1902), and shares its mythological cosmos: in the story as in the novel, Santa lives in the Laughing Valley on the border of the Forest of Burzee, and is assisted by Knooks, Ryls, fairies, and pixies. In modern editions the two works, novel and story, are sometimes published together.

Though the short story has strong similarities with the novel, it has been interpreted as presenting "a less rosy view" of the world, in that it shows elements of evil as fundamental to existence and ineradicable.

== Plot summary ==
The story opens with a quick overview of Santa's castle in the Laughing Valley. Its focus soon switches to the five Caves of the Daemons in nearby (though unnamed) mountains. These creatures are pagan daemons rather than Christian demons, in that they are not servants of Satan or necessarily evil. Four of the five, the Daemons of Selfishness, Envy, Hatred, and Malice, certainly are bad, but the fifth, the Daemon of Repentance, is a more ambiguous figure.

The Daemons of the Caves resent Santa Claus because children under the influence of his gifts rarely visit their caves. They decide to frustrate his efforts and counter his influence. (The Daemon of Repentance goes along with the plan, since children cannot reach his remote cave without passing through the caves of his compatriots beforehand.) The Daemons first try to tempt Santa Claus to their own vices; they visit him one by one, and attempt to lure him into selfishness, envy, and hatred. Santa Claus merely laughs at their clumsy efforts. (The obvious model for these episodes is the Temptation of Christ in the Synoptic Gospels.) Failing at temptation, the Daemons instead kidnap Santa Claus; they lasso him as he is riding in his sleigh on Christmas Eve, and bind him in their caverns.

Santa Claus is accompanied on his rounds by Wisk the fairy, Kilter the pixie, Peter the knook, and Nutter the ryl (introduced as "The Deputies of Santa Claus" in the last chapter of The Life and Adventures of Santa Claus), who travel under the seat of his sleigh; once the four realize that Santa is gone, they endeavor to complete his mission and deliver the gifts. They generally succeed, though with some mistakes; they deliver a toy drum to a little girl and a sewing kit to a little boy. Overall, though, they manage to save Christmas. Then they report Santa's absence; the queen of the fairies in the Forest of Burzee knows what has happened. An army of magical creatures is mustered to rescue the missing hero. Meanwhile, though, Santa is released from captivity by the Daemon of Repentance, who has repented the kidnapping. Santa meets the army on its way, and turns it back from attacking the daemons.

(In the seventh chapter of The Life and Adventures of Santa Claus, titled "The Great Battle Between Good and Evil," Baum depicts a combat between massed magical forces. Here in the short story he avoids that spectacle, a strategy he would employ again in the climax of the sixth Oz book, The Emerald City of Oz, in 1910.)

== Later editions, adaptations, influences ==
"A Kidnapped Santa Claus" appeared in an anthology of Christmas stories in 1915; The Baum Bugle reprinted it for Christmas in 1968. The story was released in book form in 1969, with a Foreword by Martin Williams and new illustrations by Richard Rosenblum. It has appeared in multiple editions in multiple forms since.

In 1989 the story was adapted into a musical play for children, Santa Claus Is Missing!, by Sylvia Ashby, with songs by Scott Taylor. Another adaptation exists in the form of the animated film Who Stole Santa? in the Oz Kids series (1996). An interactive musical, also under the title Santa Claus Is Missing written by Morna Murphy with songs by Ralph Martell, played at the Staten Island Children's Museum from 2003 to 2008.

In 2009, cartoonist Alex Robinson adapted the story into comic form in a book released by Harper Collins. A 2018 Canadian film directed by Marco Deufemia, Santa's Castle (or Christmas Castle), is based on the story, with elements derived from other works, such as Lulea being the name of the Fairy Queen, as in Queen Zixi of Ix.

More generally, the idea of kidnapping Santa Claus has been exploited by other artists in other works, as in Jean Van Leeuwen's book The Great Christmas Kidnapping Caper (1975), Tim Burton's film The Nightmare Before Christmas (1993), and Ruth Ann Pattee's play Can Mrs. Claus Save Christmas? (2000), and Santa's Castle (2018).
