= Dulah Marie Evans =

American artist (1875–1951)

Dulah Marie Evans Krehbiel
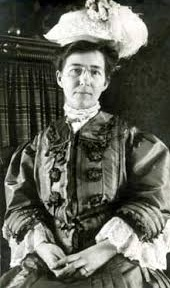
- Evans c. 1908
- Born: Dulah Marie Evans; 17 February 1875; Oskaloosa, Iowa
- Died: 24 July 1951; Evanston, Illinois
- Education: The Art Institute of Chicago, Art Students League of New York, New York School of Art
- Known for: Painting, printmaking, illustrator, photography
- Movement: Modernism, Impressionism

Dulah Marie Evans, later Dulah Marie Evans Krehbiel (17 February 1875 – 24 July 1951) was an American painter, photographer, printmaker, illustrator, and etcher.

Evans received commissions from the Armour Food Company and Santa Fe Railroad to Santa Fe, New Mexico, to photograph Native American subjects in their daily routine and performing ritualistic dances.

== Early life ==
On February 17, 1875, Dulah Marie Llan Evans was born in Oskaloosa, Iowa. Her parents were builder and architect David Evans (1825 – 1897) and Marie Ogg Evans (1845 – 1897). Her father was born in Wales, and her mother immigrated to the United States from Switzerland. She had an older brother and sister, and a younger brother as well. Her sister was Mayetta Evans, a playwright and art dealer in Chicago.

== Education ==
Evans attended William Penn University and in 1896 began her studies at The Art Institute of Chicago, where she studied under John Vanderpoel and Frederick Richardson and subsequently graduated. While a student at The Art Institute, Dulah spent her summers in Saugatuck, Michigan, studying under John Christen Johansen and other prominent artists. She completed her postgraduate work at the Art Students League in New York City, where she won many first place awards in illustration classes under the instruction of Walter Appleton Clark. She also studied under Charles Hawthorne in Provincetown, Massachusetts, and at the New York School of Art under William Merritt Chase in American Impressionism.

== Early career ==
This was the 'Golden Age of Illustration' (1865–1917) and Dulah was part of it. She held a place in the prestigious Tree Studio building in Chicago from 1903 through 1905 along with other well-known painters such as Pauline Palmer, Walter Marshall Clute, Louis Betts, and sculptor Julia Bracken Wendt, with whom she developed a close friendship. During these years, Dulah was working as an illustrator and freelance commercial artist, creating images for the covers of magazines such as Harper's Bazaar, Leslie's Illustrated Weekly, and Ladies' Home Journal.

Dulah also accepted commissions from the Armour Food Company and Santa Fe Railroad, both headquartered in Chicago at the time. These commissions often took Dulah to Santa Fe, New Mexico, to photograph Native American subjects in their daily routine and performing ritualistic dances. Many of Dulah's Southwest photographs would be used in later years as the subjects for her paintings, woodcuts, lithographs, and etchings. She completed a series of three paintings related to The Deer Dance of the Tesuque Indians in 1905.

== Marriage ==
Dulah left the Tree Studio in 1906 to marry Albert Henry Krehbiel (1873 – 1945), a classmate from The Art Institute of Chicago. Albert was awarded an American Traveling Scholarship from the Art Institute in 1903 and, having spent three years studying at Académie Julian in Paris and traveling and painting throughout Europe, had accepted a teaching position at the Institute upon his return in May 1906. In 1907, Albert reduced his schedule to teaching summer sessions only and undertook the awarded commission to design and paint the eleven wall and two ceiling murals for the Illinois Supreme Court Building in the state capitol of Springfield (the murals were completed in 1911). Dulah was Albert's only assistant, performing the duties of designing costumes, modeling, and conducting research on material pertinent to the theme of the murals. As with many husband and wife artists of the time, Dulah and Albert frequently painted together and often painted the same subject. They each had a high regard for the other's work and Albert, unlike many men of his day, was proud of his wife's artistic career and success.

From 1910 through 1915, Dulah worked out of her new "Ridge Crafts Studio" in Park Ridge, Illinois, a suburb north of Chicago where she and Albert had purchased a large home. Here, she created a line of exclusively designed cards and folders for all occasions. Most of these cards were hand-colored engraved images, while others were hand-colored lithographs. A sample sales book of these cards is now in the collection of the National Museum of Women in the Arts in Washington, D.C. Dulah's assistants, appropriately called the "Ridge Craft Girls", often pulled double duty as models for both Dulah's and Albert's paintings. However, no individual was asked to pose more than their son and only child, Evans Llan Krehbiel, born in 1914. One of Dulah's first paintings of Evans, appropriately titled Baby Krehbiel (1915, 22" x 30", oil on canvas), was featured in the Chicago Daily Herald on March 14, 1915.

During these early years in Park Ridge, Dulah and Albert were part of the Park Ridge Art colony. Founded by members of the faculty of the Art Institute, the colony's objective was to create a society that would work for the encouragement of artistic culture. As was stated in an article in The Chicago Evening Post (July 6, 1912);

" . . . All intend to support the new association, which will expend its energies in public school art, and co-operate with the other clubs, while going its own way in search of culture."

Among the other distinguished members of the Park Ridge Art Colony were founding painters Frederick Richardson, James William Pattison, Louis Betts, and Walter Marshall Clute, and sculptor John Paulding.

== Career ==
=== California ===
From 1917 through 1920, Dulah (traveling with Albert, Evans, and her sister, journalist and playwright Mayetta Evans) spent summers painting in California at the Santa Monica Art colony. Dulah's friend and fellow Tree Studio artist, Julia Bracken, had married painter William Wendt in 1906 and moved to Los Angeles, becoming one of the city's foremost sculptors. By 1918, William Wendt had built a studio at Laguna Beach and California Impressionism was in full swing. Dulah's many paintings of her son and sister posing along the beach reflected this style. One such work, Santa Monica Bay (1920, 17" x 21", oil on canvas), was exhibited at the Arts Club of Chicago in 1923, where Dulah was a founding member.

Dulah would return to Santa Monica many times, often after having spent the initial summer months at the Art colony of Santa Fe in New Mexico, which was started by Alice Corbin Henderson, editor of the magazine Poetry, and wife of Indian motif painter William Penhallow Henderson. In 1927, Dulah visited fellow artist Bror Julius Olsson Nordfeldt at his studio in Santa Fe, where she and her sister bought ten of his paintings. On this trip, Dulah took photographs of the studios of several Taos artists, including those of Ernest Blumenschein, painter and one of the founders of the Taos Society of Artists, and painter Gerald Cassidy, as well as photographs of the home of Mabel Dodge Luhan. (A wealthy heiress from New York, Mabel Dodge Luhan transformed Taos, New Mexico, into an artist colony in the 1920s and 30s by inviting such noted artists as Georgia O'Keeffe and D. H. Lawrence to join her in the town's idyllic setting, which she considered to be the center for cultural and spiritual salvation.)

It was in California that Dulah began painting in the modernist style. She created works that were more introspective in nature and which had spiritual overtones. Dulah became interested in the organization of multiple figures, often using groupings of three (perhaps to reveal a spiritual synthesis) in surrealistic mountain landscapes. She produced different tensions with each canvas by the placement of subject figures in positions juxtaposed to their rocky surroundings. One such work, Mountain Pass (September 1920, 23" x 24", oil on canvas), was exhibited at the Chicago Arts Club in 1927. Dulah created her first etchings relating to the Southwest in 1927. Her Southwest prints were sold in the Albert Roullier Galleries in Chicago and were often featured in Chicago newspapers and magazines. In 1930, Dulah left Park Ridge for New York City, where she was successful in establishing a market for her artwork at the Salons of America and the Society of Independent Artists.

=== Studio Place ===
Returning to her Park Ridge home and her studio (now called "Studio Place") in 1932, Dulah persevered in creating her ethereal landscapes throughout the decade and beyond. From the early 1920s through the 1940s, she exhibited at the Arts Club of Chicago with other well-known artists, including painter Pauline Palmer and Bauhaus photographer László Moholy-Nagy, and at The Art Institute of Chicago with painters Gerald Cassidy, Jessie Willcox Smith, Edgar Payne, and J. Alden Weir. As if to reflect the diversity of her art, throughout her career Dulah signed her works as Dulah Marie Evans, Dulah Llan Evans, and as Dulah Evans Krehbiel.

The Park Ridge Modernist, as Dulah had become known, died at the age of 76 on July 24, 1951, in Evanston, Illinois. Dulah's impressionistic work, Three Ladies at an Open Window (August 1920, 14" x 17", oil on canvas) was selected in 2001 for the permanent collection of the National Museum of Women in the Arts in Washington, D.C.

== Museum collections ==
- National Museum of Women in the Arts, Washington, D.C.

== Exhibitions ==
- 1908 The Art Institute of Chicago; Annual Exhibition of Watercolors by American Artists. Chicago, IL.
- 1916 The Art Institute of Chicago; 28th Annual Exhibition of Watercolors, Pastels, and Miniatures by American Artists; The Colonial Bouquet, pastel on paper.
- 1918 Dulah Evans Krehbiel at the First Exhibition of Works by Former Students and Instructors of the Art Institute of Chicago; January 8 to February 7, 1918
- 1921 The Art Institute of Chicago Annual Exhibition; Dawn Comes Over The Mountain, 1921, 36" x 44", oil on canvas; Decoration For Yellow Tulip Room, circa 1920, oil on canvas.
- 1922 The Art Institute of Chicago Annual Exhibition; Rain, circa 1921, oil on canvas; Music, circa 1920, 36" x 44", oil on canvas; Paloma Valley, circa 1920, 26" x 44½", oil on canvas.
- 1923 Chicago Arts Club; Santa Monica Bay, 1920,17" x 21", oil on canvas; Mountain, December 1923, 23" x 24", oil on canvas.
- 1927 Chicago Arts Club; Mountain Pass, 1920, 23" x 24", oil on canvas.
- 1932 Chicago Arts Club; Spring Rain, circa 1930, 29" x 32", oil on canvas; Our Studio Entrance, circa 1932, 32" x 29", oil on canvas.
- 1933 Chicago Arts Club; Portrait of Mayetta, circa 1933, 36" x 29", oil on canvas.
- 1935 Chicago Arts Club; Mountains of the Blue Moon, 1924, 23" x 24", oil on canvas.
- 1938 Chicago Arts Club; Cascade, A Study in Organization, 1938, 29" x 32", oil on canvas.
- 1939 Chicago Arts Club; Portrait of E.L.K. (Evans Llan Krehbiel, Dulah’s son), 1939, 32" x 26", oil on canvas.
- 1940 Chicago Arts Club; Precipice, circa 1939, oil on canvas.
- 1941 Chicago Arts Club; Arrangement of Seashells, circa 1940, oil on canvas.
- 1942 Chicago Arts Club; Flower Arrangement, circa 1942, oil on canvas.
- 1945 Chicago Arts Club; Santa Monica Bay, 1920, 17x21, oil on canvas.
- 1997 Sonnenschien Gallery, Lake Forest College, Lake Forest, Illinois. Exclusive exhibition of the works of Dulah Marie Evans.
- 1999 Chicago Cultural Center. Exhibition of the artists of the Tree Studio Building, Chicago, Illinois.
- 2003 The Art Institute of Chicago, Chicago, Illinois. "Window on the West: Chicago and the Art of the New Frontier, 1890 – 1940", June 28 through Oct. 3rd.
- 2005 The New Bedford Art Museum, New Bedford, Massachusetts. "Provincetown: A Creative Colony", Feb. 2nd through May 8.

== Retrospectives ==
- 1996 Dulah Evans: A Nineteenth-Century Modernist, Sonnenschein Gallery, Durand Art Institute, Lake Forest College, Lake Forest, IL, USA.

- 1999 Capturing Sunlight, Art of the Tree Studios, Chicago Cultural Center, Chicago, IL, USA.
