= Listed buildings in Middleton, Lancashire =

Middleton, Lancashire is a civil parish in Lancaster, Lancashire, England. It contains nine listed buildings that are recorded in the National Heritage List for England. All of the listed buildings are designated at Grade II, the lowest of the three grades, which is applied to "buildings of national importance and special interest". The parish contains the village of Middleton, and at one time the Middleton Tower Holiday Camp, which converted some of the existing buildings for its purposes. Otherwise the parish is mainly rural. Most of the listed buildings are, or originated as, houses, farmhouses and associated structures. In addition a folly and a public house are listed.

== Buildings ==
Name and location	Photograph	Date	Notes
Old Roof Tree Inn; 54.02239°N 2.87968°W	—	Late 17th century (probable)	A public house containing earlier fabric, rendered with a slate roof. It has an L-shaped plan, is in two storeys, and the main east front has four bays. The windows are mullioned, and the doorway has a battlemented lintel flanked by pilasters. One of the internal walls contains part of a single cruck truss.
Ye Olde Farm House; 54.01551°N 2.90029°W	—	Late 17th century	Originally a house that was altered in 1844, and partly converted into a bar for a holiday camp in the 20th century. It is in rendered stone with a slate roof, and in two storeys. The main range has a projecting gabled wing, with three bays to the right and two to the left. Some of the windows are mullioned, some also have transoms, and other are sashes. In the apex of the gable is an inscribed plaque. At the rear are three gabled wings, one of which has an inscribed battlemented lintel.
1 Low Road; 54.02040°N 2.88242°W	—	c. 1700	A sandstone house with a slate roof, in two storeys with an attic, and with two bays. There is a single-storey extension to the left. The windows are mullioned, and the doorway has an architrave. In the extension is a re-set lintel and a moulded cornice.
Middleton Brow Farmhouse and barn 54.01206°N 2.89400°W	—	Early 18th century	A farmhouse and a later barn in sandstone, with a roof in slate and stone-slate. The house has two storeys and two bays. Some of the windows are sashes, and some have retained their mullions. The doorway has a moulded surround. The barn to the right has a wide entrance with a segmental arch, a door and a pitching hole.
Tudor Bar; 54.01576°N 2.90064°W	—	18th century	This originated as a barn, and was converted into a bar and dance hall for a holiday camp in the 20th century. It is in sandstone with a stone-slate roof, with two outshuts on the east side. There are two doorways with long-and-short jambs. On the southern gable is a ball finial.
New Brows Farmhouse; 54.01070°N 2.89444°W	—	1751	The farmhouse is in sandstone with a modern tiled roof, in two storeys and two bays. The central doorway has a gabled porch, and above it is a plaque inscribed with initials and the date.
Tower; 54.01551°N 2.90063°W	—	Early 19th century (probable)	A folly in sandstone consisting of a circular two-stage tower with a taller narrower turret to the south. Both of these have embattled parapets. There are windows in the tower and arrow slits in the turret.
Downy Field Farmhouse and barn 54.02407°N 2.87281°W	—	Early to mid 19th century (possible)	A rendered stone house with a slate roof, incorporating earlier fabric, in two storeys and three bays. Most of the windows are sashes, and above the central ground floor window is a re-set lintel inscribed with initial, a date, and a shield. The barn to the east has a wide entrance with a segmental arch, and a gable with a ball finial.
Downy Field House; 54.02406°N 2.87297°W	—	Early to mid 19th century	The house is in sandstone with a rendered front, and a slate roof. It has two storeys and three bays. The ground floor has a French window and a verandah. The central doorway has a plain surround.
