= Necile =

Fictional character

Necile is a wood nymph who becomes the adoptive mother of Santa Claus in the 1902 novel The Life and Adventures of Santa Claus.

She recurs in the 1985 film by Rankin/Bass (voiced by Lesley Miller) then the 1996 anime series then the 2000 film by Mike Young Productions (voiced by Dixie Carter) inspired by the novel.

She has also been portrayed in musicals adapting the story.
