= William Lionel Clause =

English artist (1887–1946)

William Lionel Clause (7 May 1887 – 9 September 1946) was an English artist.

== Early life ==
Born in Middleton, Lancashire, the son of William H. Clause and his wife Minna, Clause was educated at Gresham's School, Holt, and at the Slade School of Art in London, where he was taught by Professors Frederick Brown and Henry Tonks. Clause married Lucy Sampson, the elder daughter of Professor R. A. Sampson, the Astronomer Royal of Scotland, and they had one daughter.

== Career ==
Primarily a landscape painter in oil and watercolour, Clause exhibited at the New English Art Club and the International Society of Sculptors, Painters and Gravers. He lived in London and found many of his subjects near home.

Clause is represented in many public collections. Seven of his drawings were acquired by the Contemporary Art Society and several by the War Artists' Advisory Committee for the National Gallery. He is represented by three works in Manchester, two in Bradford, one in Royal Leamington Spa and one in Carlisle.

Beyond his work as a painter, Clause was Honorary Secretary of the New English Art Club and was also a member of the Chelsea Arts Club. At the time of his death in 1946, he was living at 16, New End Square, Hampstead, London.
