= Father Christmas (disambiguation) =

Father Christmas is a Christmas gift-bringer.

Father Christmas may also refer to:

- "Father Christmas" (song), a 1977 single by the English group The Kinks
- Father Christmas (book), a 1973 children's graphic novel by Raymond Briggs
- Father Christmas (1991 film), animated short based on the book
- Father Christmas (film series), television film trilogy first broadcast between 2016 and 2018
- Father Christmas (computer worm), released in December 1988

== See also ==
- Christmas gift-bringer
- Santa Claus
- Ded Moroz
