= Frederick Richardson =

American illustrator (1862–1937)

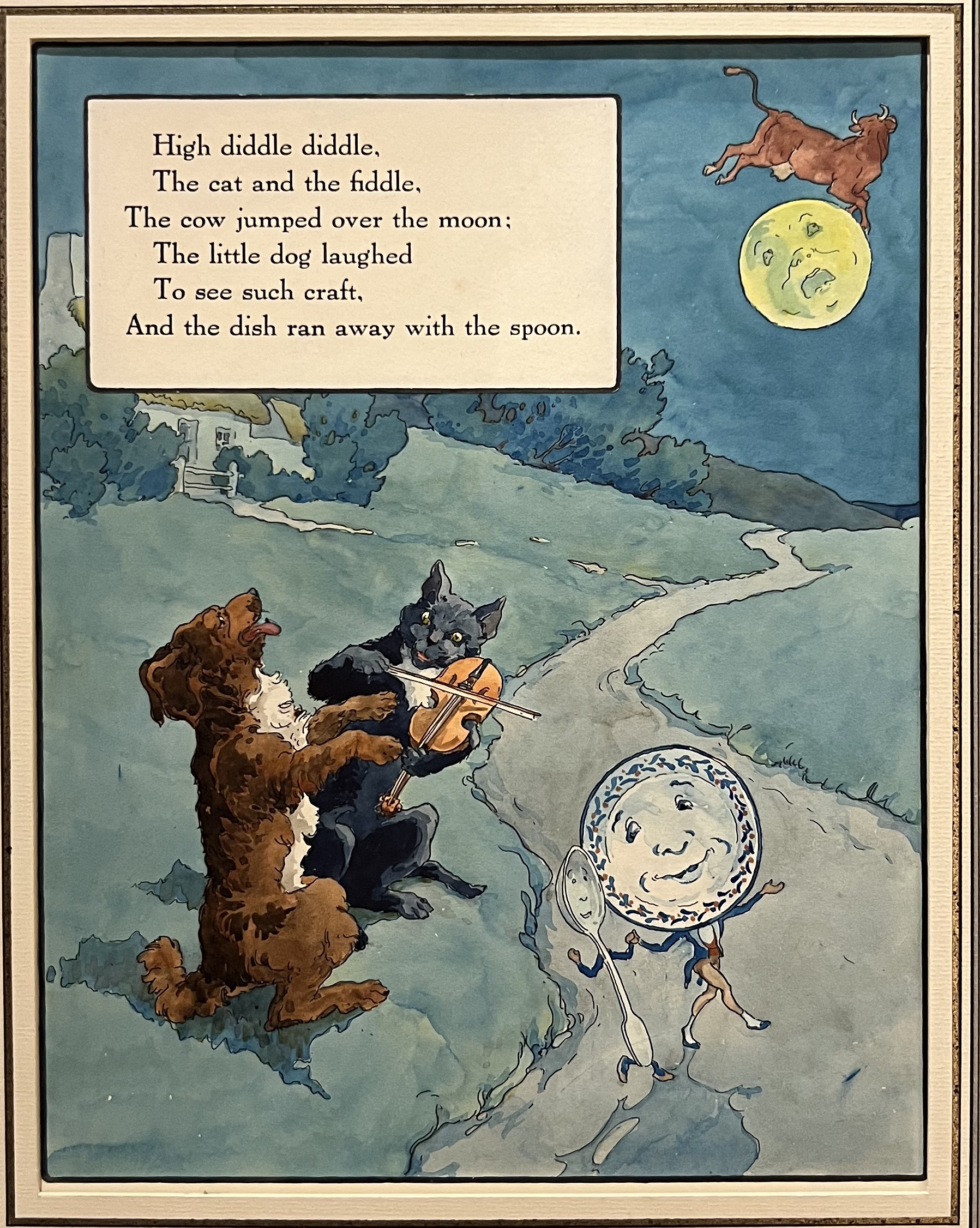
Frederick Richardson's illustration of "Hey Diddle Diddle" from the Volland edition of Mother Goose (1915)

Frederick Richardson (1862 – 15 January 1937) was an American illustrator of the late nineteenth and early twentieth centuries, best remembered for his illustrations of works by L. Frank Baum.

== Life and career ==
A native Chicagoan, Richardson studied at the St. Louis School of Fine Arts and at the Académie Julian in Paris. He taught at the Chicago Art Institute for seven years; Albert Henry Krehbiel and Dulah Evans Krehbiel were two of his students. He was "a slightly-built, gray-eyed man" whose work "was strongly influenced by the Art Nouveau movement...." From 1892 on, if not earlier, Richardson made a living as a newspaper illustrator, working for the Chicago Daily News; he produced many pictures of the famous World's Columbian Exposition in 1893. His employers valued his work highly enough to send Richardson back to Paris to cover the Exposition Universelle Internationale, the world's fair of 1900. A collection of his newspaper work from the Daily News was published in 1899.

In 1903 Richardson moved to New York City to pursue book illustration. His first book was Baum's Queen Zixi of Ix, which was published serially in St. Nicholas Magazine in 1904 and 1905 and in book form in the latter year. Richardson also drew pictures for Baum's "A Kidnapped Santa Claus", which first appeared in The Delineator in December 1904. His artwork also appears in the California State Series "Third Reader".

Richardson followed that initial work with many other book-illustration projects, including editions of the works of Hans Christian Andersen, Aesop's Fables, Mother Goose, Pinocchio, and East of the Sun and West of the Moon, plus two volumes in the series of Andrew Lang's Fairy Books. Richardson did abundant work for the Chicago publisher P. F. Volland; in illustrating collections of tales by Georgene Faulkner he varied his usual artistic style, imitating Japanese art for her Little Peachling and Other Tales of Old Japan (1928), and Indian art for her The White Elephant and Other Tales from Old India (1929).

Richardson provided pictures for a series of schoolbooks called the Winston Readers. He illustrated Frank R. Stockton's The Queen's Museum (1906), Edith Ogden Harrison's The Enchanted House (1913), and Frances Jenkins Olcott's The Red Indian Fairy Book (1917), among other works.

According to youngest son, Allan, Richardson provided a variety of illustrations to the Works Progress Administration during the Great Depression.

For John Heming Fry's "diatribe against modernism," The Revolt Against Beauty (1934), Richardson supplied pictures that parodied the work of Paul Gauguin and Vincent van Gogh and characters from newspaper comic strips. After his death in 1937, Richardson was memorialized with a posthumous volume that matched traditional tales, like "Three Billy Goats Gruff" and "The Bremen Town Musicians", with brightly colored illustrations by the artist.

Richardson died of pneumonia in New York City and was survived by Allan Barbour, one of his two sons. Richardson's oldest son, David Welles, preceded his father in death by a few months, having died in September 1936.

== See also ==
- Belle Silveira
