= The Life and Adventures of Santa Claus =

1902 children's book by L. Frank Baum

- First edition
- Author: L. Frank Baum
- Illustrator: Mary Cowles Clark
- Language: English
- Genre: Children's literature, Christmas stories
- Publisher: Bowen Merrill
- Publication date: April 12, 1902
- Publication place: United States
- Media type: Print (hardcover)
- OCLC: 3343074

The Life and Adventures of Santa Claus is a 1902 children's book, written by L. Frank Baum and illustrated by Mary Cowles Clark.

== Setting ==
The story takes place in the Forest of Burzee and nearby lands. Baum pictures the forest as a mighty and grand forest, with "big tree-trunks, standing close together, with their roots intertwining below the earth and their branches intertwining above it;" a place of "queer, gnarled limbs" and "bushy foliage" where the rare sunbeams cast "weird and curious shadows over the mosses, the lichens and the drifts of dried leaves." Among the "giant oak and fir trees" are clearings where "the grass grew green and soft as velvet." The forest is populated by fairies, ruled by an unnamed fairy queen (in later books named either Lulea or Lurline), along with nymphs, gnomes, pixies, and species of beings invented by Baum including ryls, knooks, and gigans.

At the east of the Forest of Burzee is the Laughing Valley which was empty for years until Santa Claus built his house there.

== Plot ==
As a baby, Santa Claus is found in the Forest of Burzee by Ak, the Master Woodsman of the World (a supreme immortal) and placed in the care of the lioness Shiegra, but he thereupon is adopted by the wood nymph Necile.

Upon reaching young adulthood, Claus is introduced by Ak to human society, wherein he sees war, poverty, and child neglect. Because he cannot reside in Burzee as an adult, he settles in the nearby Laughing Valley of Hohaho where the immortals regularly assist him and Peter Knook gives him a little cat named Blinky.

In the Laughing Valley, Claus becomes known for kindness toward children. On one occasion, his neighbors' son Weekum visits him. Having made an image of Blinky to pass the time, Claus presents him with the finished carving, which thereby becomes the first toy in existence. Soon, the immortals begin assisting him in the production of other carvings, by bringing supplies and giving advice. The Ryls, for example, bring him the pigments they use to color flowers so he can start painting the toys (the first toy was not colored). When he makes a clay figure reminiscent of Necile, he proclaims it a "dolly" to evade naming Necile to the children ("doll" results when children shorten the name). Claus presents the first one to Bessie Blithesome, a local noblewoman, after consulting with Necile and the queen of the fairies about whether he should give toys to wealthy children. Later dolls resemble Bessie herself and, later still, infants.

The awgwas, evil beings who can turn invisible, steal the toys that Claus is giving to the children because the toys are preventing the children from misbehaving. They first attempt to kill Claus; when Claus's immortal friends rescue him, they settle for preventing his toy deliveries. This continues until Ak declares war upon them after failing to get them to cease their attacks. With the aid of the Asiatic dragons, the three-eyed giants of Tartary, the goozzle-goblins, and the black demons from Patalonia, the awgwas believe their might superior to that of the immortals as they meet them in battle. The awgwas and their allies are destroyed by their opponents with Ak killing the awgwa king while the remaining giants of Tartary retreat. Claus is not present for any of the battle. When it is concluded, Ak tells him that "the awgwas have perished".

The following winter, Claus is aided by two deer named Glossie and Flossie, who pull him in a sleigh full of toys because he cannot walk through the deep snow. They journey by night, as Will Knook will not grant the deer permission to leave Burzee by day. When Claus is unable to enter locked doors, he descends through chimneys to leave toys behind. As Claus continues giving gifts, he earns the title "Santa" ("Saint" in most Romance languages).

Because the deer return to Burzee one minute after sunrise, Will Knook threatens them with punishment. Ak negotiates between Claus and the Knooks, with the result that Claus can continue to use deer, but only once a year, on Christmas Eve. This date was chosen by the Knook Prince to delay Claus by a year, as it was only ten days before the holiday and he had no toys left, but the fairies solve this by retrieving the toys the awgwas stole and bringing them to Claus. The gnome king, who wants toys for his children, trades a string of sleigh bells for each toy given by Claus.

Claus sees stockings placed by the fire to dry as a good place for his surprises, but when he finds a family (sometimes taken to be Native Americans, or caricatures of the same) living in a tent with no fireplaces, he puts the gifts on the branches of a tree that he places just outside the tent.

When Claus is an old man, the immortals realize he is near the end of his life. A council headed by Ak (Master Woodsman of the World), Bo (Master Mariner of the World), and Kern (Master Husbandman of the World) gather together other immortals to decide the fate of Santa Claus. After much debate, he is granted immortality just as the spirit of death comes for him.

At the end of the book, the immortal Santa Claus takes on four special deputies: Wisk the fairy, Peter the knook, Kilter the pixie, and Nuter the ryl.

Baum's short follow-up, "A Kidnapped Santa Claus", further develops his relationship with his deputies, who must work in his place when Claus is captured by five daemons. Later, children's parents and various toy-making companies take part in gift-giving, and Santa Claus withdraws to his valley.

== Adaptations ==
A graphic novel adaptation of the story was published by Tundra Publishing Ltd. in 1992 and illustrated by Mike Ploog. An animated movie was created by Rankin-Bass (and was their last Animagic, or stop-motion, special) in 1985, followed by another animated version of Baum's book made by Mike Young Productions and directed by Glen Hill in 2000. The book also served as the basis for an anime series, Shōnen Santa no Daibôken ("Young Santa's Adventures") in 1994, and The Oz Kids video, Who Stole Santa? (1996).

=== Rankin-Bass production ===
The Rankin-Bass production first aired on CBS on December 17, 1985. The special truncates much of the story (it ran in a one-hour time slot) and simplifies some of the motivations, but its major alterations are setting up the hearing over the Mantle of Immortality as a frame story explaining just why Claus (J. D. Roth/Earl Hammond) deserves the mantle, although there is an edit that makes it difficult to realize that the scene in which Ak (Alfred Drake) calls the council when first finding the infant in the woods does not occur in the same time period as the main story. In addition, Shiegra accompanies Claus to the Laughing Valley, in which, unlike the book, it is always Winter. A similar compromise toward popular culture is Claus's now eight reindeer, albeit unnamed. Peter Knook, a rather crusty but amiable fellow, replaces most of the other Knooks, save the Protector (King) and two strangers, and declares "only on Christmas Eve" for the reindeer without any argument or explanation. One important new character, Tingler, a Sound Imp (Robert McFadden) also accompanies Claus and gives him someone to talk to.

When the show premiered, the book was not as easily available, and many Oz fans who only knew of the book were surprised to discover that Tingler was not one of Baum's creations, so true was the character to the author's spirit. Earle Hyman portrayed the King of the Awgwas, and Leslie Miller played Necile. Most of the other voices were performed by Peter Newman and Lynne Lipton. Larry Kenney was the Commander of the Wind Demons, who initially served as a devil's advocate to Ak at the fateful hearing, but soon became the Immortal most approving of giving the Mantle to Claus. Most of the Immortals' titles were changed to alleviate them all being kings and queens.

Screenwriter Julian P. Gardner created a musical production number, "Big Surprise" as the children at Weekum's orphanage plead with Santa Claus for more toy cats. Other songs include the chorus "Babe in the Woods" and the powerful chant, "Ora e Sempre (Today and Forever)" representing the immortals. Bernard Hoffer composed the music, as well as setting a quatrain by Baum inspired by Claus's famous laugh. The presentation of the Christmas tree is different; Claus, realizing his death is imminent, decorates a tree with ornaments and suggests it should be his memorial.

This, along with Pinocchio's Christmas, are the only Rankin-Bass Christmas specials without a celebrity narrator. Originally broadcast on CBS, this special regularly aired on the Freeform cable network, as part of their annual "25 Days of Christmas", along with most of the other Rankin-Bass animated Christmas specials. As of 2018, AMC currently airs the special.

=== Mike Young production ===
The Mike Young production, which also uses an ampersand for the title, features Robby Benson as "Nicholas", who plays a bigger part in this film than in the earlier version. Claus at his very oldest is portrayed by Jim Cummings. While the Rankin-Bass production made the sequence with the Awgwas a centerpiece, in this film, they become running villains, and the story is structured around the upcoming battle. Some of the more fairy tale-oriented names are changed—Bessie Blithesome becomes "Natalie" (Kath Soucie) and Weekum becomes "Ethan" (Brianne Siddall). Neither version mentions Lerd by name. Here the Lord of Lerd is given the same voice, Maurice LaMarche, as the King of the Awgwas, now called Mogorb. LaMarche also plays an unidentified Bo, an argumentative figure at the film's climax, which is crosscut with the Spirit of Death's approach to Nicholas's house. Shiegra does not accompany Nicholas to Laughing Valley, but visits him at his home when she is near death to say goodbye, after which he creates a large monument in her honor. The Gnome King's exchange of gifts is replaced with Natalie at young adulthood returning her doll to Nicholas to make up in her own small way for all the toys stolen by the Awgwas: Nicholas proclaims that others should follow his example and give and receive gifts. The biggest change is the transformation of Wisk into a Brian Froud-designed long-tailed Pixie (Carlos Alazraqui), introduced early in the film and serving as comic relief. He suggests the name "Necileloclaus", that Ak, narrating the story, changes to "Nicholas", rather than Baum's "Neclaus". A significant thematic change is Nicholas spreading information about the immortals far and wide, to the point he never coins the term "dolly", just mass-produces "Neciles". Dixie Carter portrayed Necile and Hal Holbrook played Ak, who chooses Christmas as the day of Claus's yearly rides for its significance, much to the delight of Wil Knook, for the same reasoning as in the book. Misha Segal provides a Celtic-inflected score, with song lyrics by Harriet Schock.

=== Oz Kids ===
The kidnapping of Claus by the Awgwas is the basis of the Oz Kids video, "Who Stole Santa?", which appears to draw no material from "A Kidnapped Santa Claus". An adult version of Dorothy Gale tells the life story of Santa based on the book to her children and her friends. (Note: the Awgwas are excised from Dorothy's tale.)

=== Graphic novel ===
The major change in Mike Ploog's graphic novel is placing the Gnome King in charge of nearly everyone (Baum's hierarchy placed only the "Great Creator" above the three Masters of the world) and making him resemble the Nome King as he appeared in Return to Oz, a film for which Ploog was a conceptual artist. He also has a Knook and a Ryl serve as Claus's constant companions. The Gnome King has been omitted from most other adaptations, presumably to avoid confusion with the malevolent character in Return to Oz, though an unidentified figure voiced by Peter Newman appears on the council over immortality in the Rankin-Bass version. Based on the lineup in the book, he could be only the Gnome King, Bo, or Kern, but his stature leads one to guess the Gnome King.

=== Anime ===
Shōnen Santa no Daibôken ran for 24 episodes, airing between April 6 to September 21, 1996.

The characters and cast include:

- Claus: Mifuyu Hiiragi
- Santa Claus: Masato Yamanouchi
- Goozzle: Tomohiro Nishimura
- Beezle: Yuji Ueda
- Blinky the cat: Hekiru Shiina
- Mayrie: Megumi Hayashibara
- May: Mika Kanai
- Rye: Akio Otsuka
- Ak: Tōru Shinagawa
- Flossie (reindeer): Naoki Tatsuta
- Glossie (reindeer): Fumihiko Tachiki
- Necile: Nobuko Shinokura
- Peter the Knook: Hiroshi Masuoka
- Shiegra (lion): Urara Takano
- Zurline: Yo Inoue
- King Awgwa: Takashi Matsuyama

== Unproduced films ==
An animated feature film, a co-production between Hyde Park Entertainment and Toonz Entertainment as well as the Gang of 7 Animation, was planned for a 2010 holiday theatrical release.

The script was written by Tom Tataranowicz and Mark Edward Edens with Tataranowicz also acting as director together with Dick Sebast and Rich Arons. The movie would have been the first animated film for Hyde Park. Production was set to begin in November 2008 at the Toonz Animation Studio in India. Hyde Park Entertainment would have distributed the movie internationally and share domestic rights with G7.

The story would have followed the establishment of Santa mythology depicting both the formative years as well as a battle against evil. The film was ultimately canceled.

=== Winter's Knight ===
In March 2014, Deadline Hollywood reported that an origin story of Santa Claus, Winter's Knight, inspired by The Life and Adventures of Santa Claus, sold to Sony studios for $1 million.

The script is written by Jake Thornton and Ben Lustig and is set to be directed by Joachim Rønning and Espen Sandberg.

== Audio drama ==
The novel was adapted into an audio drama as part of Aron Thomas' The Chronicles of Oz series, with Stuart Anderson as Santa, Gareth Severn as Ak, Tegan Harris as Necile and Benjamin Maio Mackay as the King of the Awgwas. The audio drama deviates slightly from the novel in order to make more of a connection to Baum's Oz universe, such as adding Princess Azkedelia (a character introduced in a later television series), while also having Claus be mortally wounded at the climax, adding urgency to the Immortals' debate about whether to bestow the mantle of immortality on him.

== Sequel ==
=== Queer Visitors from the Marvelous Land of Oz ===
The December 18, 1904 edition of Baum's short-running newspaper series Queer Visitors from the Marvelous Land of Oz, entitled "How the Woggle-Bug and His Friends Visited Santa Claus," relating how the Scarecrow, Tin Woodman, Jack Pumpkinhead, and H. M. Woggle-Bug, T. E. make several toys based on themselves and the Sawhorse. They bring them to Santa Claus in the Laughing Valley for distribution. Claus claims that there are not enough toys for all of the children, but he will make more for next year's visit. His reindeer and sleigh also win a race against the Gump.

=== "A Kidnapped Santa Claus" ===
In 1904, a short story called "A Kidnapped Santa Claus", by Baum, appeared in The Delineator magazine. It was illustrated by Frederick Richardson, who had also illustrated Baum's Queen Zixi of Ix. The story deals with Santa Claus's kidnapping by the Daemons of the caves, in an effort to thwart his yearly delivery of toys. However, Claus's assistants complete the task for him, and later attempt an unnecessary rescue.

=== The Road to Oz ===
In Baum's 1909 Oz book, The Road to Oz, Santa Claus is one of guests of honor at Princess Ozma's birthday party in the Emerald City. He brings along some Ryls and Knooks with him. They return to the Laughing Valley in giant soap bubbles created by the Wizard of Oz.

== See also ==
- List of Christmas-themed literature
