= Albert Henry Krehbiel =

American painter (1873–1945)

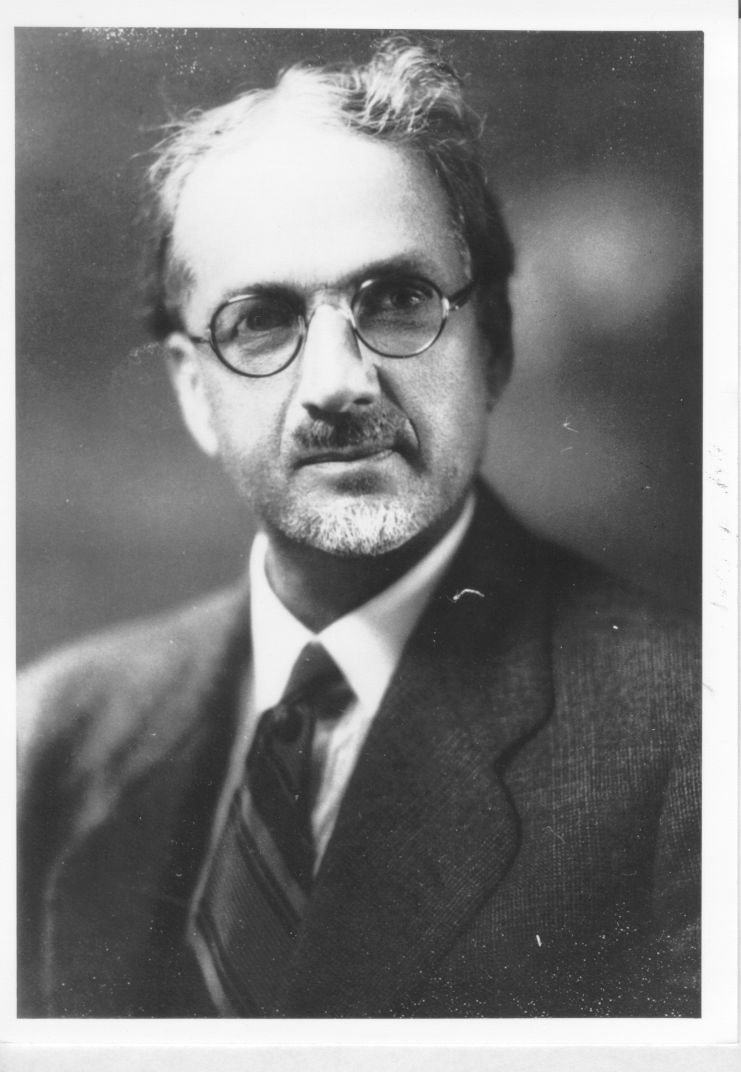
- Born: November 25, 1873; Denmark, Iowa, United States
- Died: June 29, 1945 (aged 71); Evanston, Illinois
- Education: Art Institute of Chicago, Chicago, Illinois; Académie Julian, Paris, France
- Known for: Painting; Drawing; Muralist;
- Movement: Impressionism, Neoclassical, Synchromism, Abstract

Albert Henry Krehbiel (November 25, 1873 – June 29, 1945), was the most decorated American painter ever at the French Academy, winning the Prix De Rome, four gold medals and five cash prizes. He was born in Denmark, Iowa and taught, lived and worked for many years in Chicago. His masterpiece is the programme of eleven decorative wall and two ceiling paintings / murals for the Supreme and Appellate Court Rooms in Springfield, Illinois (1907–1911). Although educated as a realist in Paris, which is reflected in his neoclassical mural works, he is most famously known as an American Impressionist. Later in his career, Krehbiel experimented in a more modernist manner (a style that became known as "synchromism").

== Life and career ==
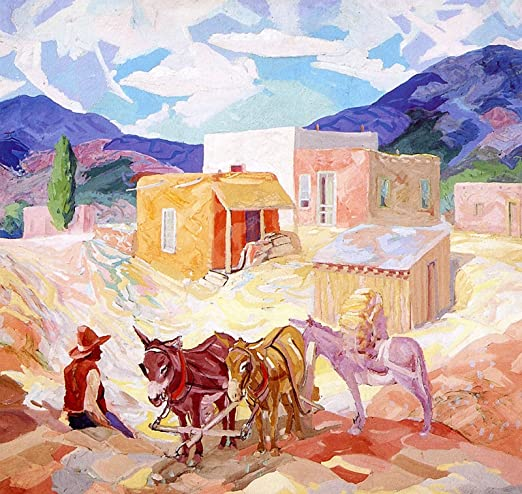
Santa Fe Horseman

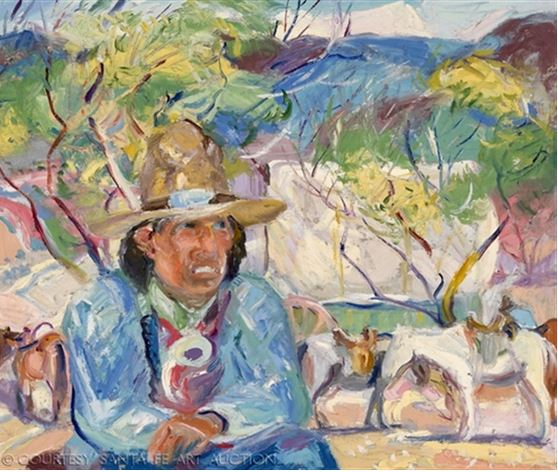
Native Indian

Born in Denmark, Iowa, in 1873. In 1879, he moved with his family to Newton, Kansas, where his father was a prominent Mennonite layman, prosperous carriage and buggy maker, and later a co-founder of Bethel College. In the summer of 1898, Krehbiel made his way from Newton to Chicago by bicycle with his younger brother, Fred, and enrolled at The Art Institute for the fall semester. Albert Henry Krehbiel became a graduate of the Art Institute of Chicago, where, in 1902, he was granted an American Traveling Scholarship to study abroad. In 1903, he began his three years of study at the Académie Julian in Paris under history painter and muralist Jean-Paul Laurens.; Krehbiel won four gold medals at the Académie Julian (the only American ever to have done so) as well as the coveted Prix de Rome. In 1905, he received the esteemed honor of having two of his neoclassical works selected by jury for the annual exhibition organized by the Société des Artistes Français in Paris (also known as the Paris Salon).

Returning to the United States, Krehbiel was commissioned to design and paint the mural for the wall of the Chicago Juvenile Court in 1906. In 1907, he was unanimously awarded the commission in a national competition to design and paint the eleven wall and two ceiling murals for the Supreme and Appellate Court Rooms of the Illinois Supreme Court Building in Springfield, the state's capital. Begun in 1907, the final Supreme Court Building mural was completed and installed in 1911. Mr. W. Carby Zimmerman, architect of the building, considered the work done by Krehbiel to be "an example of the best mural painting ever executed in the West."

In 1918 and 1919, Krehbiel spent his summers at art colonies in Santa Monica, California, and in Santa Fe, New Mexico. From 1920 through 1923, he spent summers exclusively in Santa Fe as an exhibiting member of the Santa Fe Art Colony. In the summers of 1922 and 1923, Krehbiel was invited by the Museum of New Mexico in Santa Fe to participate in its Visiting Artists Program and was given a studio in the prestigious Palace of the Governors next to his contemporary, Ashcan realist Robert Henri.

Krehbiel had associations and exhibitions with the other artists of the Santa Fe Art Colony—and the Taos Society of Artists—such as George Bellows and Gustave Baumann (exhibition in McPherson, Kansas, 1918), and Bror Julius Olsson Nordfeldt, Marsden Hartley, and Sheldon Parsons (exhibition in El Paso, Texas, 1920). Other notable artists that Krehbiel exhibited with during this period include William Victor Higgins, Ernest L. Blumenschein, John French Sloan, Raymond Jonson, and Stuart Davis.

Krehbiel was a member of the faculty at the Art Institute of Chicago for 39 years and at the Armour Institute of Technology (later Illinois Institute of Technology after merging with the Lewis Institute) for 32 years. In 1926, he helped pioneer the Chicago Art Institute Summer School of Painting (later named Ox-Bow) in Saugatuck, Michigan, where he spent most of his remaining summers teaching and painting. In 1934, Krehbiel opened his own summer school of art in Saugatuck called the AK Studio When able to break away from his students, he would capture the surrounding rolling hills and the Kalamazoo River in oil, watercolor, and pastel. He would often visit Saugatuck in winters to portray the area in its vast and billowing cover of snow.

=== Painting outdoors ===
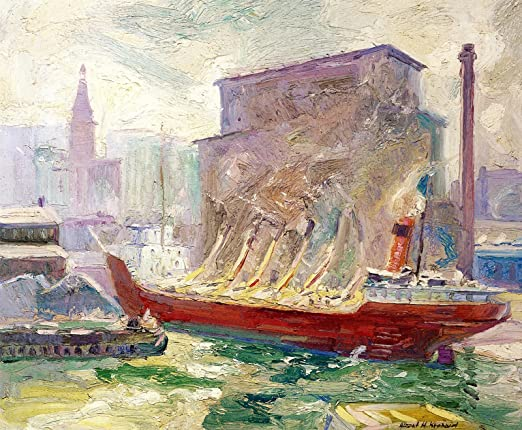
Loading a Grain Freighter

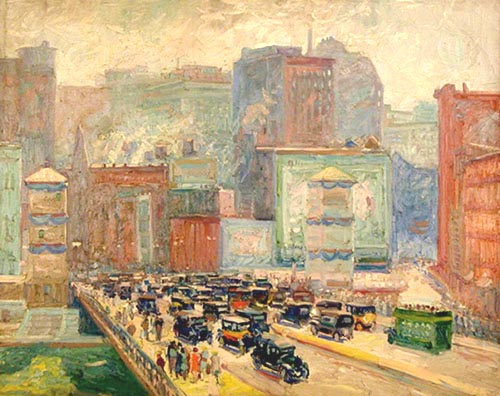
Looking South on the Michigan Ave. Bridge

During the years of 1912 through about 1930, Krehbiel was known to leave his Park Ridge, Illinois, home on a freezing cold morning and not return until the end of the day with two or three freshly painted canvases of the surrounding landscape. He also composed many watercolors and countless pastels of the area, often capturing the local inhabitants in the warmer months working in the fields or taking a moment to enjoy the lush forest landscape populated with brooks and streams. Occasionally, Krehbiel would visit the northern Illinois town of Galena on weekends and holidays to paint large canvases of the tree-covered hills with their scattering of homes and barns.

When teaching at the Art Institute of Chicago and residing (at the Cliff Dwellers Club) in downtown Chicago, Krehbiel turned to recreating the urban landscapes, most of them within walking distance to his classrooms. These familiar scenes were painted between classes from the banks of the Chicago River. Most were painted during rush hour when automobiles and pedestrians populated the bridges and streets. He painted the Michigan Avenue Bridge and the Chicago River numerous times, each from a different perspective. Most of the images of the bridge were executed in 1920, the year of its grand opening, with the bridge towers draped in banners of red, white, and blue ribbons.

Beginning in around 1926 and continuing through the early 1940s, Krehbiel created a series of synchromistic figure compositions in watercolor and in oil on small, unstretched pieces of canvas and, in the latter years, in pastel and in oil on larger canvases as well. The figures in this series reproduce the postures of models in his art classes and, while naturalistic at first, they gradually become geometric, even somewhat cubist. Krehbiel developed this new style into a method of teaching figure depiction by having students compose while drawing. Sketches of a three-figure model group, observed from various points in the room, would be rendered on a single sheet of paper – or a series of quick poses by one model would be composed on a single sheet. He also produced a large number of landscapes in this synchromistic and relatively abstract style beginning in 1926. Created mainly in Saugatuck, most of these works were done in pastel on paper.

== Death ==
Throughout the years, Krehbiel painted continuously. From his sketches and paintings done while studying in Paris and his neoclassical murals to his impressionistic American Southwest works, Chicago street and river scenes, and wooded presentations of the rural Midwest to his synchromistic figure compositions and landscapes, he painted incessantly and in all seasons without regard for the elements. Albert Henry Krehbiel died from a heart attack on June 29, 1945, in Evanston, Illinois, while preparing for a traveling and painting trip through Illinois and Kansas. His death occurred a few days after his retirement from teaching at the Illinois Institute of Technology, although he had agreed to stay on at The Art Institute of Chicago for one more year.

== Awards ==
Krehbiel was awarded an American Traveling Scholarship to study abroad by The Art Institute of Chicago in 1902; Awarded the permanent placement of a painting on the wall of Académie Julian, Paris, France, 1905; Had two of his neoclassical works selected by jury for exhibition at the Salon Des Artistes Francais (also known as the Paris Salon), Paris, 1905; Awarded the Prix de Rome for painting, Paris, 1906; Won four gold medals for painting (the most ever awarded to an American) and five cash prizes for drawing and composition, Académie Julian, Paris, 1904–1906; Unanimously awarded by jury the commission to design and paint the eleven wall and two ceiling murals for the Illinois Supreme and Appellate Court Rooms, Springfield, Illinois, 1906; William Ormond Thompson Prize, The Art Institute of Chicago, for The Snow Covered Road, Illinois, landscape, 1919; Martin B. Cahn Prize, Painting by a Chicago Artist, The Art Institute of Chicago, for Wet Snow in the Woods, Illinois, landscape, 1922; Clyde Carr Prize for Landscape, American Artists, The Art Institute of Chicago; American Artists Exhibit of Landscapes Award, The Art Institute of Chicago; Municipal Art League Prize for Landscape, Chicago Artists, The Art Institute of Chicago. In February 2008, Albert Krehbiel was named the Illinois State Historical Artist for the thirteen murals that he painted for the ceilings and walls of the Illinois Supreme Court Building in Springfield, Illinois.

== Exhibitions ==
During his prolific career, Albert Henry Krehbiel's works were shown in a multitude of exhibitions. Some of Krehbiel's career resume of prominent exhibitions includes the following:

- Salon des Artistes Français, Paris, France (1905)
- The American Art Association in Paris, France (1905)
- Société des Artistes Français, Paris, (1905)
- Nine paintings at Académie Julian, Paris France (1903–1906)
- Two paintings in the Louvre, Paris, France (ca. 1905)
- Albert H. Krehbiel at the First Exhibition of Works by Former Students and Instructors of the Art Institute of Chicago; January 8 to February 7, 1918
- Regular exhibitions in the 1920s and 1930s, and a Memorial Exhibition in 1946, at the Cliff Dwellers Club. Chicago, Illinois
- The Pennsylvania Academy of the Fine Arts in 1923 (118th American Exhibition), 1928, and 1931
- The Fiesta Exhibition of Paintings by Artists of New Mexico at the Museum of New Mexico in Santa Fe, (1923)
- The First Exhibition of the National Society of Mural Painters at the Buffalo Fine Arts Academy Albright Art Gallery in Buffalo, New York, (1925)
- The Art Institute of Chicago: Special Exhibitions; Sculpture by Nancy Cox McCormack, Mural Paintings by Puvis de Chevannes, Albet Besnard and The National Society of Mural Painters, March 17 to April 24,1925
- A Century of Progress International Exposition held to commemorate the 100th anniversary of the incorporation of the City of Chicago, (1933–1934)
- A total of thirty-two exhibitions at the Art Institute of Chicago from 1906 through 1939
- Birger Sandzen Memorial Gallery, Lindsborg, Kansas (1978)
- Supreme Court of Illinois Art Exhibit of Murals, Friezes and Illinois landscapes (1980)
- Further detailed listing of exhibitions of the works of Albert Henry Krehbiel

== Museums / Collections ==
Krehbiel's works are held in the collections of The Art Institute of Chicago, the De Paul University Art Museum in Chicago, the University of Michigan Museum of Art in Ann Arbor, the Fine Arts Museums of San Francisco M. H. De Young Museum, the Mary and Leigh Block Museum of Art at Northwestern University in Evanston, Illinois, The Dubuque Museum of Art, Dubuque, Iowa, The John Vanderpoel Art Association, Chicago, Illinois and the Burlington Northern and Santa Fe Railway Company in Fort Worth, Texas. Albert Henry Krehbiel currently has 171 works listed in the Smithsonian Institution Inventories of American Paintings and Sculpture in Washington, D.C., and selected archival material on Krehbiel's career is available at the Smithsonian Institution Archives of American Art in Washington, D.C., as well as at The Art Institute of Chicago's Ryerson & Burnham Libraries and at fine arts libraries throughout the country.

== Museum Collections Online ==
- Albert Krehbiel works in the Smithsonian American Art Museum Art Inventories Catalog
- Albert Krehbiel works in the permanent collection of The Art Institute of Chicago
- Albert Krehbiel works in the permanent collection of The De Paul University Art Museum
- Albert Krehbiel in the permanent collection of The University of Michigan Museum of Art
- Albert Henry Krehbiel papers, 1893–1985; Archives of American Art, Smithsonian Institution; Washington, D.C.

== Murals Online ==
- Albert Krehbiel's murals at the Illinois Supreme Court Building: The Third Branch – A Chronicle of the Illinois Supreme Court; The History of the Illinois Supreme Court
- Slideshow of Albert Krehbiel's murals at the Illinois Supreme Court Building -- Welcome to Illinois Courts
- Albert Henry Krehbiel murals exhibit at KrehbielArt.com
- Albert Krehbiel in his studio in Park Ridge, Illinois; Illinois Digital Archives; the Illinois State Library and the Office of the Illinois Secretary of State
