= List of Nintendo DS games (Q–Z) =

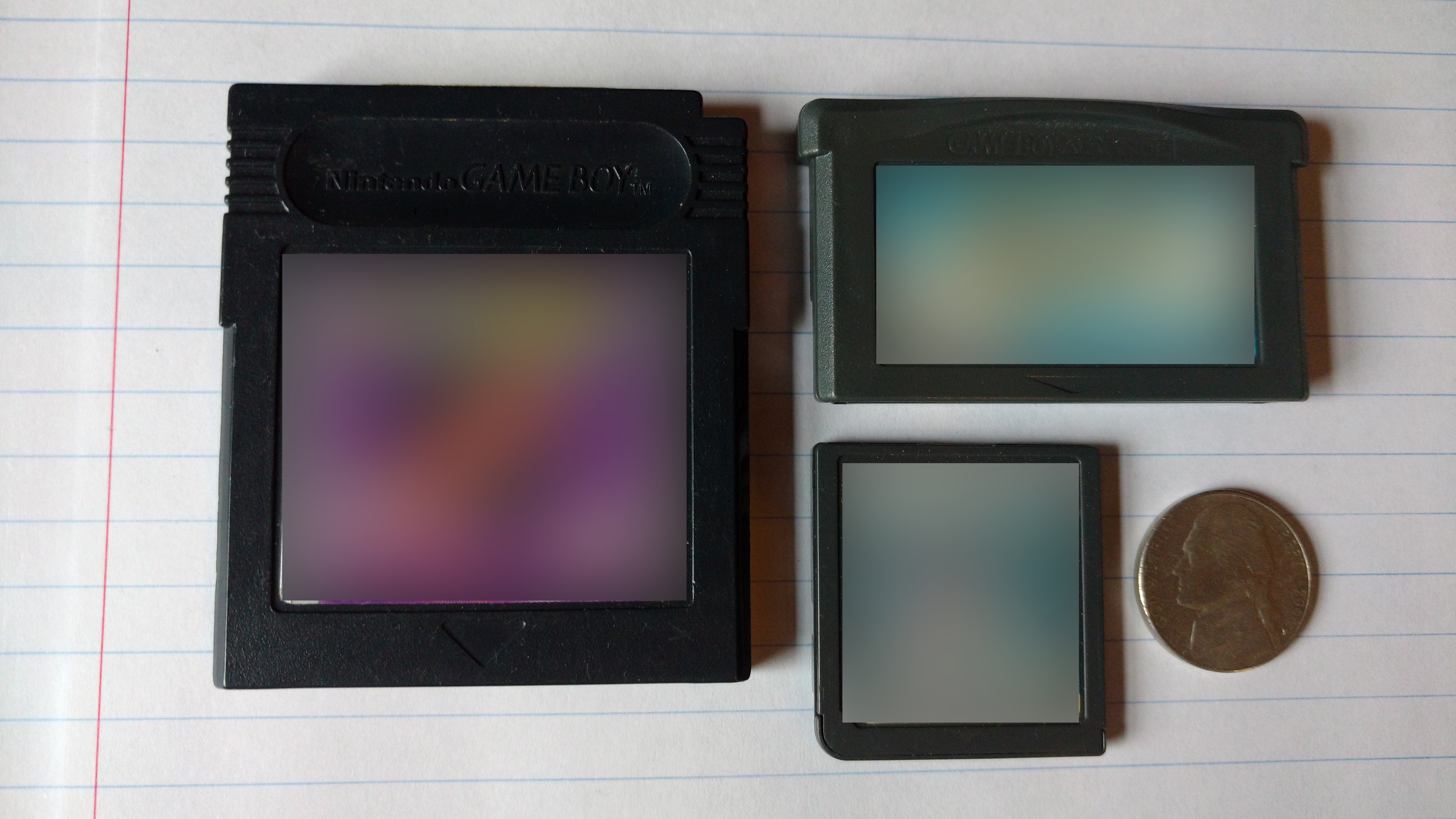
Clockwise from left: A Game Boy game cartridge, a Game Boy Advance game cartridge, and a Nintendo DS game card. On the far right is a United States Nickel shown for scale.

This is a list of physical video games for the Nintendo DS, DS Lite, and DSi handheld game consoles. It does not include games released on DSiWare or the iQue DS. The last game for the Nintendo DS, Big Hero 6: Battle in the Bay, was released on October 28, 2014.

== Games ==
There are currently 3240 games in this table across all pages: 0 to C, D to I, J to P, and Q to Z.

Title	Developer(s)	Publisher(s)	First released	JP	NA	EU	AU
Quest Braintainment	ThePharmacy	ThePharmacy	September 10, 2010 (EU)	No	No	Yes	No
Questions pour un Champion: Le Jeu Officiel - Edition Speciale 20 Ans	Mindscape	Mindscape	June 13, 2008 (EU)	No	No	Yes	No
QuickSpot	Namco Bandai Games America	Namco, Namco Bandai Games America	February 9, 2006 (JP)	Yes	Yes	No	No
Quiz & Touch Kensaku: Mushi Zokan DS (Note: Primarily an insect-encyclopedia application, though it includes mini-games in addition to its insect quizzes.)	Spike	Spike	July 12, 2007 (JP)	Yes	No	No	No
The Quiz 30000-Mon	Luxe	D3Publisher	December 20, 2007 (JP)	Yes	No	No	No
Quiz Kirameki Star Road	Warashi	Taito	August 10, 2006 (JP)	Yes	No	No	No
Quiz Magic Academy DS	Konami	Konami	September 12, 2008 (JP)	Yes	No	No	No
Quiz Magic Academy DS: Futatsu no Jikūseki	Konami	Konami	February 11, 2010 (JP)	Yes	No	No	No
Quiz no Tabi	Success	Success	May 29, 2008 (JP)	Yes	No	No	No
Quiz Present Variety Q-Sama!! DS: Pressure Study x Atama ga Yoku naru Drill SP	Plenty	Kamui	October 27, 2011 (JP)	Yes	No	No	No
Quiz Taxi	SevenOne Intermedia	SevenOne Intermedia	January 29, 2009 (EU)	No	No	Yes	No
Quiz! Hexagon II	Infinity	Bandai Namco Games	July 22, 2010 (JP)	Yes	No	No	No
Quiz! Nihongo-Ou	Success	Success	December 14, 2006 (JP)	Yes	No	No	No
Raa Raa The Noisy Lion	Uacari	Avanquest Software	July 13, 2012 (EU)	No	No	Yes	No
Rabbids Go Home	Ubisoft Montpellier	Ubisoft	November 1, 2009 (NA)	No	Yes	Yes	Yes
Race Driver: Create and Race	Firebrand Games	Atari, Codemasters	September 28, 2007 (PAL)	No	Yes	Yes	No
Radiant Historia	Atlus	Atlus	November 3, 2010 (JP)	Yes	Yes	No	No
Rafa Nadal Tennis	Virtual Toys	Codemasters	January 5, 2007 (PAL)	No	Yes	Yes	No
Ragnarok Online DS	GungHo Works	GungHo Works, Xseed Games	December 18, 2008 (JP)	Yes	Yes	No	No
Rain Drops	CyberPlanet Interactive	UFO Interactive	September 9, 2008 (NA)	No	Yes	No	No
Rainbow Islands Revolution	Taito Corporation	Codemasters, Rising Star Games, Taito Corporation	December 29, 2005 (JP)	Yes	Yes	Yes	No
Ram Racing	Storm City Games	Storm City Games	October 12, 2011 (NA)	No	Yes	No	No
Rango	Behavior Studios	Paramount Digital Entertainment	February 25, 2011 (PAL)	No	Yes	Yes	Yes
Rapala Pro Bass Fishing	Magic Pockets	Activision	September 28, 2010 (NA)	No	Yes	No	No
Rayman DS	Ubisoft Montreal	Ubisoft	March 11, 2005 (PAL)	No	Yes	Yes	No
Rayman Raving Rabbids	Ubisoft Montpellier	Ubisoft	March 6, 2007 (NA)	No	Yes	Yes	No
Rayman Raving Rabbids 2	Ubisoft Paris	Ubisoft	November 13, 2007 (NA)	No	Yes	Yes	No
Rayman Raving Rabbids TV Party	Ubisoft Paris	Ubisoft	November 18, 2008 (NA)	Yes	Yes	Yes	No
Reader Rabbit Kindergarten; Kalle Kunskap: 4-7 år^{EU}	The Learning Company, Prelusion Games	Graffiti Entertainment, Nordic Softsales	December 15, 2009 (NA)	No	Yes	Yes	No
Reader Rabbit: On a Mission to Help the Lion Flowers; Kalle Kunskap: På uppdrag hos Lejonblommorna - Matematik 4-8 år^{SE}	Prelusion Games	Nordic Softsales	September 28, 2010 (EU)	No	No	Yes	No
Ready Steady Cook	Mindscape	Mindscape	August 14, 2009 (EU)	No	No	Yes	Yes
Real Adventures: Wild Horses	Mindscape	Mindscape	February 7, 2008 (PAL)	No	No	Yes	No
Real Crimes: Jack the Ripper	Virtual Playground	Avanquest Software	October 1, 2010 (PAL)	No	No	Yes	No
Real Crimes: The Unicorn Killer	Licensed 4U	Licensed 4U	November 30, 2011 (PAL)	No	No	Yes	No
Real Football 2008	Gameloft	Gameloft, Ubisoft	October 12, 2007 (PAL)	No	Yes	Yes	No
Real Football 2009	Ubisoft	Ubisoft	November 4, 2008 (NA)	Yes	Yes	Yes	Yes
Real Stories FashionShop; Real Stories: Passion 4 Fashion^{FR}	Mindscape	Mindscape	October 9, 2008 (PAL)	No	No	Yes	No
Real Stories Mission Equitation; My Horse Club: Auf der Spur des Appaloosas^{DE}	Mindscape	Mindscape	September 30, 2008 (PAL)	No	No	Yes	No
Real Stories Veterinaire	Mindscape	Mindscape	September 16, 2008 (PAL)	No	No	Yes	No
Real Time Conflict: Shogun Empires	Box Clever Interactive	Namco	November 21, 2005 (NA)	No	Yes	No	No
Really? Really!	Kadokawa Shoten	Kadokawa Shoten	June 25, 2009 (JP)	Yes	No	No	No
Rec Room Games	Destineer	Destineer	February 22, 2011 (NA)	No	Yes	No	No
Red Bull BC One	Smack Down Productions	NA: Ignition Entertainment; EU: Playlogic	August 28, 2008 (EU)	No	Yes	Yes	No
Red Stone DS: Akaki Ishi ni Michibikareshi Monotachi	GameOn	GameOn	May 26, 2011 (JP)	Yes	No	No	No
Rekishi Adventure: Quiz San Goku Shi Tsuu DS	Mainichi Communications	Mainichi Communications	December 11, 2008 (JP)	Yes	No	No	No
Rekishi Gunzou Presents: Monoshiri San Goku Shi	Global A	Global A	December 11, 2008 (JP)	Yes	No	No	No
Rekishi Taisen Gettenka: Tenkaichi Battle Royale	Sega	Sega	November 25, 2010 (JP)	Yes	No	No	No
Relaxuma * Rhythm: Mattari Kibun de Da Run Run Run	Rocket Company	Rocket Company	December 3, 2009 (JP)	Yes	No	No	No
Remindelight	Japan Art Media	Taito Corporation	September 28, 2006 (JP)	Yes	No	No	No
Remyuouru no Renkinjutsushi	Mainichi Communications	Mainichi Communications	July 31, 2008 (JP)	Yes	No	No	No
Resident Evil: Deadly Silence	Capcom	Capcom, Nintendo	January 19, 2006 (JP)	Yes	Yes	Yes	Yes
Restaurant Tycoon	Foreign Media	Foreign Media	May 28, 2010 (PAL)	No	No	Yes	No
Retro Arcade Toppers	Engine Software	Media Sales & Licensing	October 28, 2010 (PAL)	No	No	Yes	No
Retro Atari Classics	Taniko	Atari	March 11, 2005 (PAL)	Yes	Yes	Yes	No
Retro Game Challenge	indieszero	Bandai Namco Games, Xseed Games	November 15, 2007 (JP)	Yes	Yes	No	No
Reversal Challenge	CyberPlanet Interactive	UFO Interactive Games	November 3, 2009 (NA)	Yes	No	No	No
Rhapsody: A Musical Adventure	Nippon Ichi Software	Nippon Ichi Software, NIS America, Square Enix, Ubisoft	August 7, 2008 (JP)	Yes	Yes	Yes	No
Rhythm 'n Notes: Improve Your Music Skills	Success Corporation	505 Games, Agetec, Success Corporation	January 11, 2007 (JP)	Yes	Yes	Yes	No
Rhythm de Cooking	MTO	MTO	November 13, 2008 (JP)	Yes	No	No	No
Rhythm de Run Run Run	Alpha Unit	Alpha Unit	December 3, 2009 (JP)	Yes	No	No	No
Rhythm Heaven	Nintendo	Nintendo	July 31, 2008 (JP)	Yes	Yes	Yes	No
Ridge Racer DS	Namco; Nintendo Software Technology	Namco	December 7, 2004 (NA)	No	Yes	Yes	Yes
Riding Academy; Real Stories Cheval Academy^{FR} Pferd & Pony: Die Reitakademie^{DE}	Mindscape	Mindscape	October 19, 2009 (PAL)	No	No	Yes	No
Riding Academy 2 Die Reitakademie: Das Entscheidende Turnier^{DE}	Mindscape	Mindscape	September 3, 2010 (PAL)	No	No	Yes	No
Riku to Johan: Kaeta Nimai no E	fonfun	fonfun	July 3, 2008 (JP)	Yes	No	No	No
Ringling Bros. and Barnum & Bailey: Circus Friends - Asian Elephants; Ringling Bros. and Barnum & Bailey: It's My Circus - Elephant Friend^{EU}	Cat Daddy Games	2K Games	November 10, 2009 (NA)	No	Yes	Yes	Yes
Rio	1st Playable Productions	THQ	April 7, 2011 (NA)	No	Yes	Yes	Yes
Rise of the Guardians	Torus Games	D3 Publisher	November 20, 2012 (NA)	No	Yes	Yes	Yes
River City Soccer Hooligans; Kunio-Kun no Chou Nekketsu! Soccer League Plus World Hyper Cup Hen^{JP}	Avit-Niigata	Arc System Works	May 27, 2010 (JP)	Yes	Yes	No	No
River City Super Sports Challenge; Kunio-Kun no Chou Nekketsu! Daiundoukai^{JP}	Million	Aksys Games	October 12, 2010 (JP)	Yes	Yes	No	No
River King: Mystic Valley	Marvelous Entertainment	Marvelous Entertainment, Natsume Inc., Rising Star Games	June 28, 2007 (JP)	Yes	Yes	Yes	No
Road to Vegas	Nintendo	Midas Interactive Entertainment	August 22, 2008 (PAL)	No	No	Yes	No
Roary the Racing Car	Uacari	Avanquest	August 7, 2009 (EU)	No	No	Yes	Yes
Robocalypse	Vogster Entertainment	Vogster Entertainment	October 28, 2008 (NA)	No	Yes	No	No
Robots	Amaze Entertainment	Vivendi Games	February 24, 2005 (NA)	Yes	Yes	Yes	No
Rock Band 3	Backbone Entertainment	MTV Games	October 26, 2011 (NA)	No	Yes	Yes	Yes
Rock Blast	UFO Interactive Games	UFO Interactive Games	August 5, 2008 (NA)	No	Yes	No	No
Rock Revolution	HB Studios	Konami	October 14, 2008 (NA)	No	Yes	Yes	No
Rock University Presents: The Naked Brothers Band The Video Game •The Naked Brothers Band: The Videogame^{AUS}	1st Playable Productions	THQ	October 20, 2008 (NA)	No	Yes	No	Yes
Rockin' Pretty •Happy Star Band^{JP/KR} •Diva Girls: Making the Music^{EU}	Arc System Works	Arc System Works, 505 Games, Aksys Games, CyberFront	May 21, 2009 (JP)	Yes	Yes	Yes	No
Rockman EXE Operate Shooting Star	Capcom	Capcom	November 12, 2009 (JP)	Yes	No	No	No
Roller Angels: Pasha to Daisakusen	Starfish SD	Starfish SD	June 17, 2010 (JP)	Yes	No	No	No
Rollin' Rascals	Hoget	Majesco, Rising Star Games	May 12, 2009 (NA)	No	Yes	Yes	No
Ron-Q! Highland in DS	3 O'Clock	3 O'Clock	August 7, 2008 (JP)	Yes	No	No	No
Rondo of Swords	Success Corporation	Atlus, Success Corporation	August 9, 2007 (JP)	Yes	Yes	No	No
Roogoo Attack	SpiderMonk Entertainment	SouthPeak Games	June 30, 2009 (NA)	No	Yes	Yes	No
Rooms: The Main Building	HandMade Game	Hudson Soft	March 23, 2010 (NA)	Yes	Yes	Yes	Yes
Rosario + Vampire: Tanabata no Miss Yōkai Gakuen	Capcom	Capcom	March 20, 2008 (JP)	Yes	No	No	No
RPG Tsukuru DS	Enterbrain	Enterbrain	March 11, 2010 (JP)	Yes	No	No	No
RPG Tsukuru DS+: Create the New World	Kadokawa	Kadokawa	December 15, 2011 (JP)	Yes	No	No	No
The Rub Rabbits!	Sonic Team	Sega	October 20, 2005 (JP)	Yes	Yes	Yes	No
Rubik's World	Two Tribes	The Game Factory	October 28, 2008 (NA)	No	Yes	Yes	No
Rudolph the Red-Nosed Reindeer	Glyphic Entertainment	Red Wagon Games	November 9, 2010 (NA)	No	Yes	No	No
Runaway 2: The Dream of The Turtle	Cyanide	Focus Home Interactive	November 30, 2007 (PAL)	No	No	Yes	No
Runaway: A Twist of Fate	Pendulo Studios	Dreamcatcher	May 7, 2010 (PAL)	No	No	Yes	No
Rune Factory 2: A Fantasy Harvest Moon	Neverland Co.	Marvelous Entertainment, Natsume Inc.	January 3, 2008 (JP)	Yes	Yes	Yes	Yes
Rune Factory 3: A Fantasy Harvest Moon	Neverland Co.	Marvelous Entertainment, Natsume Inc.	October 22, 2009 (JP)	Yes	Yes	Yes	No
Rune Factory: A Fantasy Harvest Moon	Neverland Co.	Marvelous Entertainment, Natsume Inc., Rising Star Games	August 24, 2006 (JP)	Yes	Yes	Yes	Yes
Safari Adventures Africa	Conspiracy Entertainment	Neko Entertainment	November 3, 2009 (NA)	No	Yes	Yes	No
Safecracker: The Ultimate Puzzle Adventure	JoWooD Productions	DreamCatcher Games	December 3, 2009 (NA)	No	Yes	Yes	No
SaGa 2: Hihou Densetsu - Goddess of Destiny	Racjin	Square Enix	September 17, 2009 (JP)	Yes	No	No	No
SaGa 3 Jikū no Hasha: Shadow or Light	Racjin	Square Enix	January 6, 2011 (JP)	Yes	No	No	No
The Sagasou: Fushigi na Konchuu no Mori	DreamFactory	D3Publisher	June 28, 2007 (JP)	Yes	No	No	No
The Saibanin: 1-tsu no Shinjitsu, 6-tsu no Kotae	WitchCraft	D3 Publisher	May 21, 2009 (JP)	Yes	No	No	No
Saihai no Yukue	Omega Force	Koei	October 23, 2008 (JP)	Yes	No	No	No
Saikin Koi Shiteru?	Microvision	D3 Publisher	July 30, 2009 (JP)	Yes	No	No	No
Saikyou Toudai Shogi DS	Mainichi Communications	Mainichi Communications	May 10, 2007 (JP)	Yes	No	No	No
Sailor Moon: La Luna Splende	Banpresto/OpenSesame Inc.	Bandai Namco Games	March 16, 2011 (EU)	No	No	Yes	No
Saiyuuki: Kinkaku, Ginkaku no Inbou	ThinkArts	D3Publisher	July 12, 2007 (JP)	Yes	No	No	No
Saka no Gabaibaa-Chan	Beyond Interactive	Tryfirst	February 12, 2009 (JP)	Yes	No	No	No
Sakana to Asobou! Aquazone DS - Kaisuigyo	GungHo	GungHo	March 27, 2008 (JP)	Yes	No	No	No
SakaTsuku DS: Touch and Direct	Sega	Sega	November 20, 2008 (JP)	Yes	No	No	No
SakaTsuku DS: World Challenge 2010	Sega	Sega	May 27, 2010 (JP)	Yes	No	No	No
Sakura Note: Ima ni Tsunagaru Mirai	Audio Games	Marvelous Entertainment	November 5, 2009 (JP)	Yes	No	No	No
Sally's Salon	Capcom	Capcom	November 4, 2008 (NA)	No	Yes	No	No
Salon Superstar; Beauty Salon^{EU}	Crush Digital	505 Games	December 8, 2009 (NA)	No	Yes	Yes	No
Sam Power: Footballer	Ubisoft	Ubisoft	March 13, 2009 (EU)	No	No	Yes	No
Samantha Oups!	Le Caillou	Mindscape	May 8, 2006 (EU)	No	No	Yes	No
Samantha Swift and the Hidden Roses of Athena	MumboJumbo	Easy Interactive	July 26, 2010 (NA)	No	Yes	Yes	No
San Goku Shi DS	Koei	Koei	February 23, 2006 (JP)	Yes	No	No	No
San Goku Shi DS 2	Koei	Koei	November 1, 2007 (JP)	Yes	No	No	No
San Goku Shi DS 3	Koei	Koei	January 28, 2010 (JP)	Yes	No	No	No
San-X Chara Sagashi Land	MTO	MTO	April 19, 2007 (JP)	Yes	No	No	No
San-X Character Channel: All-Star Daishuugou!	MTO	MTO	August 28, 2008 (JP)	Yes	No	No	No
San-X Land: Theme Park de Asobou	MTO	MTO	March 30, 2006 (JP)	Yes	No	No	No
Sands of Destruction	imageepoch	Sega	September 25, 2008 (JP)	Yes	Yes	No	No
Sangokushi Taisen DS	Sega	Sega	January 25, 2007 (JP)	Yes	No	No	No
Sangokushi Taisen Ten	Sega	Sega	August 7, 2008 (JP)	Yes	No	No	No
Sankei Sports Kanshuu: Wi-Fi Baken Yosou Ryoku Training: Umania 2007 Nendo-ban	Dimple Entertainment	Dimple Entertainment	November 22, 2007 (JP)	Yes	No	No	No
Sansuu Puzzle de Migaku: Gakken Otona no Shikou Sense	Gakken	Gakken	October 18, 2007 (JP)	Yes	No	No	No
Santa Claus is Comin' to Town!	Crave	Crave	November 8, 2011 (NA)	No	No	Yes	No
Sarah: Keeper of the Unicorn	Kritzelkratz 3000, Tivola	DreamCatcher Interactive, JoWooD Entertainment	November 19, 2007 (EU)	No	Yes	Yes	No
Saru Saru DS	mobcast inc.	D3Publisher	February 19, 2009 (JP)	Yes	No	No	No
Satisfashion: Rock the Runway	TechFront	Destineer	June 8, 2010 (NA)	No	No	Yes	No
SBK: Snowboard Kids	Atlus	Atlus, Rising Star Games	November 22, 2005 (NA)	Yes	Yes	Yes	No
Scene It? Twilight	Konami	Konami	February 9, 2010 (NA)	No	Yes	Yes	No
Science Papa	Activision	Activision	July 15, 2009 (NA)	No	Yes	Yes	No
Scooby-Doo! and the Spooky Swamp	Torus Games	Warner Bros. Interactive Entertainment	September 14, 2010 (NA)	No	Yes	Yes	No
Scooby-Doo! First Frights	Torus Games	Warner Bros. Interactive Entertainment	September 22, 2009 (NA)	No	Yes	Yes	No
Scooby-Doo! Unmasked	Artificial Mind and Movement	THQ	October 18, 2005 (NA)	No	Yes	Yes	No
Scooby-Doo! Who's Watching Who?	Human Soft	THQ	October 16, 2006 (NA)	No	Yes	Yes	No
Scrabble 2007 Edition	Ubisoft	Ubisoft	September 14, 2007 (PAL)	No	No	Yes	No
Scrabble 2009 Edition	Wizarbox	Ubisoft	March 20, 2009 (NA)	No	Yes	Yes	No
Scrabble: Crossword Game	Stainless Games	Electronic Arts	March 17, 2009 (NA)	No	Yes	No	No
Scribblenauts	5th Cell	Warner Bros. Interactive	September 15, 2009 (NA)	No	Yes	Yes	No
Scripps Spelling Bee	Webfoot Technologies	THQ	September 28, 2010 (NA)	No	No	Yes	No
Scurge: Hive	Orbital Media	SouthPeak Games	November 1, 2006 (NA)	No	Yes	Yes	No
SD Gundam G Generation DS	Bandai	Bandai	May 26, 2005 (JP)	Yes	No	No	No
SD Gundam G Generation: Cross Drive	Bandai Namco Games	Bandai Namco Games	August 9, 2007 (JP)	Yes	No	No	No
SD Gundam Sangokuden Brave Battle Warriors: Shin Mirisha Taisen	Bandai Namco Games	Bandai Namco Games	December 2, 2010 (JP)	Yes	No	No	No
Sea Monsters: A Prehistoric Adventure	Atomic Planet Entertainment	Destination Software	October 19, 2007 (PAL)	No	Yes	Yes	No
Sea Park Tycoon	Most Wanted Entertainment	Destineer	March 25, 2010 (NA)	No	Yes	Yes	No
Secret Files 2: Puritas Cordis	Fusionsphere Systems	Deep Silver	May 8, 2009 (EU)	No	No	Yes	No
Secret Files: Tunguska	10tacle Studios, Fusionsphere Systems	Deep Silver	May 23, 2008 (PAL)	No	Yes	Yes	No
Secret Flirts	Smack Down Productions	Nobilis	August 27, 2010 (EU)	No	No	Yes	No
The Secret Saturdays: Beasts of the 5th Sun	1st Playable Productions	D3 Publisher	October 20, 2009 (NA)	No	Yes	Yes	Yes
Secret Story: Le Jeu Officiel de l'Emission	So Nice Productions	Anuman Interactive	July 29, 2009 (EU)	No	No	Yes	No
Secrets of the Titanic	Avanquest Software	Avanquest Software	April 13, 2009 (EU)	No	No	Yes	No
Sega Casino	Sega	Sega	November 11, 2005 (NA)	No	Yes	Yes	No
Sega Superstars Tennis	Sumo Digital	Sega	March 18, 2008 (NA)	No	Yes	Yes	No
Seitokai no Ichizon: DS-suru Seitokai	Kadokawa Games	Kadokawa Shoten	March 25, 2010 (JP)	Yes	No	No	No
Sekai Fushigi Hakken DS: Densetsu no Hitoshi-kun Ningyou o Sagase	FuRyu	FuRyu	August 6, 2009 (JP)	Yes	No	No	No
Sekai no Hate Made Itte Q! Chinjuu Hunter Imoto no Daibouken	Scarab Studio	Kamui	May 27, 2010 (JP)	Yes	No	No	No
Sekai no Shogi	Success	Success	October 25, 2007 (JP)	Yes	No	No	No
Sengoku Spirits: Gunshiden	Tasuke	Tasuke	March 18, 2010 (JP)	Yes	No	No	No
Sengoku Spirits: Moushouden	Tasuke	Tasuke	March 18, 2010 (JP)	Yes	No	No	No
Sengoku Spirits: Shukunden	Tasuke	Tasuke	March 18, 2010 (JP)	Yes	No	No	No
The Senkan	Tamsoft	D3Publisher	August 9, 2007 (JP)	Yes	No	No	No
The Sensha	Vingt-et-un Systems	D3Publisher	October 25, 2007 (JP)	Yes	No	No	No
Sesame Street: Cookie's Counting Carnival (Note: Primarily a preschool mathematics-learning application, though it includes carnival-themed educational mini-games involving counting, shapes, patterns and balloon inflation.)	Black Lantern Studios	Warner Bros. Interactive Entertainment	October 19, 2010 (NA)	No	Yes	No	Yes
Sesame Street: Elmo's A-to-Zoo Adventure (Note: Primarily a preschool literacy-learning application, though it includes zoo-themed educational mini-games involving letters, sounds, colours and patterns.)	Black Lantern Studios	Warner Bros. Interactive Entertainment	October 19, 2010 (NA)	No	Yes	No	Yes
Sesame Street: Elmo's Musical Monsterpiece	Black Lantern Studios	Warner Bros. Interactive Entertainment	July 15, 2012 (NA)	No	Yes	No	No
Sesame Street: Ready, Set, Grover!	Griptonite Games	Warner Bros. Interactive Entertainment	August 2, 2011 (NA)	No	Yes	No	No
Settlement: Colossus	Easy Interactive	Easy Interactive	May 25, 2012 (EU)	No	No	Yes	No
The Settlers	Blue Byte	Ubisoft	August 3, 2007 (NA)	No	Yes	Yes	No
Shakugan no Shana DS	MediaWorks	MediaWorks	March 29, 2007 (JP)	Yes	No	No	No
Shamu's Deep Sea Adventures	Activision	Activision	November 8, 2005 (NA)	No	Yes	Yes	No
Shanghai	Kouyousha	Success	December 22, 2005 (JP)	Yes	No	No	No
Shanghai DS 2	SunSoft	SunSoft	September 23, 2010 (JP)	Yes	No	No	No
Shaun the Sheep	Art	D3 Publisher	September 23, 2008 (NA)	No	Yes	Yes	No
Shaun the Sheep: Off His Head	Art	D3 Publisher	September 23, 2009 (NA)	No	Yes	Yes	No
Shaun White Snowboarding	Ubisoft Montreal	Ubisoft	November 16, 2008 (NA)	No	Yes	Yes	No
Shawn Johnson Gymnastics	Zoo Games	Zoo Games	November 30, 2010 (NA)	No	Yes	No	No
Shepherd's Crossing 2 Hakoniwa Seikatsu: Hitsuji Mura DS^{JP}	Success	Success, Graffiti Entertainment	July 2, 2009 (JP)	Yes	Yes	No	No
Sherlock Holmes and the Mystery of Osborne House	Frogwares	THQ	June 25, 2010 (NA)	No	Yes	Yes	No
Sherlock Holmes: The Mystery of the Mummy	Frogwares	DreamCatcher Games, Focus Home Interactive	March 19, 2009 (PAL)	No	Yes	Yes	No
Shichida Shiki Training Unou Tanren Unotan DS: Otona no Sokudoku Training (Note: Primarily a speed-reading training application, though it includes additional brain-training games as warm-up exercises.)	HuneX	Interchannel	April 19, 2007 (JP)	Yes	No	No	No
Shin Hisui no Shizuku: Hiiro no Kakera 2 DS	Idea Factory	Idea Factory	June 16, 2011 (JP)	Yes	No	No	No
Shin Lucky * Star Moe Drill	Kadokawa	Kadokawa	May 24, 2007 (JP)	Yes	No	No	No
Shin Megami Tensei: Devil Survivor	Atlus	Atlus	January 15, 2009 (JP)	Yes	Yes	No	No
Shin Megami Tensei: Devil Survivor 2	Atlus	Atlus	July 28, 2011 (JP)	Yes	Yes	Yes	No
Shin Megami Tensei: Strange Journey	Atlus	Atlus	October 8, 2009 (JP)	Yes	Yes	No	No
Shin Noukyo Iku	Marvelous Entertainment	Marvelous Entertainment	December 3, 2009 (JP)	Yes	No	No	No
Shin Seiki Evangelion: Ayanami Ikusei Keikaku with Asuka Hokan Keikaku	BROCCOLI, Gainax	Gainax	August 27, 2008 (JP)	Yes	No	No	No
Shining Force Feather	Flight-Plan	Sega	February 19, 2009 (JP)	Yes	No	No	No
Shining Stars: Super Starcade	Frame Studios Interactive	Destination Software, Zoo Digital Publishing	August 8, 2008 (PAL,NA)	No	Yes	Yes	No
Shinken Zemi Shougaku Kouza: Challenge 5-nensei Perfect Kanji Keisan Master DS	Good-Feel	Benesse	2011 (JP)	Yes	No	No	No
Shinreigari: Ghost Hound DS	5pb.	5pb.	July 31, 2008 (JP)	Yes	No	No	No
Shinseiki Evangelion Ayanami Ikusei Keikaku DS with Asuka Hokan Keikaku	Broccoli	Broccoli	August 28, 2008 (JP)	Yes	No	No	No
Shion no Ō	NCS	NCS	April 10, 2008 (JP)	Yes	No	No	No
Shogi World Champion: Gekisashi DS	Mainichi Communications	Mainichi Communications	January 28, 2010 (JP)	Yes	No	No	No
Shonen Kininden Tsumuji	Neuron Age	Electronic Arts	February 25, 2010 (JP)	Yes	No	No	No
Shorts	Artificial Mind and Movement	Majesco	July 11, 2009 (NA)	No	Yes	No	No
The Shouboutai	D3 Publisher	D3 Publisher	June 26, 2008 (JP)	Yes	No	No	No
Shounen Sunday & Shounen Magazine: White Comic	Konami	Konami	October 15, 2009 (JP)	Yes	No	No	No
Shounen Sunday x Shounen Magazine: Nettou! Dream Nine	Konami	Konami	February 26, 2009 (JP)	Yes	No	No	No
Showtime Championship Boxing	Destination Software	Destination Software, Zoo Digital Publishing	November 10, 2007 (NA)	No	Yes	Yes	No
Shugo Chara! 3-tsu no Tamagoto Koisuru Joker	Konami	Konami	March 13, 2008 (JP)	Yes	No	No	No
Shugo Chara! Amu's Rainbow-Colored Character Change!	Konami	Konami	November 6, 2008 (JP)	Yes	No	No	No
Shugo Chara! Norinori! Character Transformation zoom	Konami	Konami	August 6, 2009 (JP)	Yes	No	No	No
Sid Meier's Civilization Revolution	Firaxis Games	2K Games	July 8, 2008 (NA)	No	Yes	Yes	Yes
Sideswiped; Clash King V201^{JP}	Majesco	Majesco	September 17, 2009 (JP)	Yes	Yes	No	No
Sigma Harmonics	Think Garage	Square Enix	August 21, 2008 (JP)	Yes	No	No	No
Signal	Studio Altair	D3 Publisher	December 3, 2009 (JP)	Yes	No	No	No
Silke: Pixeline Lillesoster - Honsefodder og Gulerodder; Sofie: Hoensefoetter og Guleroetter^{NOR}	Krea Media	Krea Media	2011 (EU)	No	No	Yes	No
Silke: Pixeline Lillesoster - Syng, Leg og Laer; Sofie: Syng Lek og Laer^{NOR}	Krea Media	Krea Media	2011 (EU)	No	No	Yes	No
Silly Bandz	Zoo Games	Zoo Games	November 23, 2010 (NA)	No	Yes	No	No
Silverlicious	CokeM Interactive	GameMill Publishing	March 13, 2012 (NA)	No	Yes	No	No
SimAnimals	Electronic Arts	Electronic Arts	January 21, 2009 (NA)	Yes	Yes	Yes	No
SimAnimals Africa	Maxis	Electronic Arts	October 27, 2009 (NA)	Yes	Yes	Yes	No
SimCity Creator (Nintendo DS)	Electronic Arts	EA Games, Electronic Arts	March 19, 2008 (JP)	Yes	Yes	Yes	No
SimCity DS	EA Japan	EA Games, Electronic Arts	February 22, 2007 (JP)	Yes	Yes	Yes	No
Simple DS Series Vol. 08: The Kanshikikan - Kinkyuu Shutsudou!! Jiken Genba wo Touch Seyo	Tomcat System	D3 Publisher	May 25, 2006 (JP)	Yes	No	No	No
Simple DS Series Vol. 12: The Party Unou Quiz	Mobile & Game Studio	D3 Publisher	December 7, 2006 (JP)	Yes	No	No	No
Simple DS Series Vol. 15: The Kanshikikan 2 - Aratanaru 8-tsu no Jiken wo Touch seyo	Tomcat System	D3 Publisher	May 31, 2007 (JP)	Yes	No	No	No
Simple DS Series Vol. 18: The Soukou Kihei Gun Ground	RideonJapan, Inc.	D3 Publisher	July 26, 2007 (JP)	Yes	No	No	No
The Simpsons Game	Electronic Arts	EA Games	October 30, 2007 (NA)	No	Yes	Yes	No
The Sims 2	Griptonite Games	Electronic Arts	October 24, 2005 (NA)	Yes	Yes	Yes	No
The Sims 2: Apartment Pets	Electronic Arts	Electronic Arts	August 26, 2008 (NA)	No	Yes	Yes	No
The Sims 2: Castaway	Maxis	EA Games, Electronic Arts	October 22, 2007 (NA)	Yes	Yes	Yes	No
The Sims 2: Pets	Maxis	EA Games	October 27, 2006 (EU)	Yes	Yes	Yes	No
The Sims 3	The Sim Studio, Edge of Reality	Electronic Arts	October 26, 2010 (NA)	No	Yes	Yes	Yes
Six Flags Fun Park	Brash Entertainment	Brash Entertainment	October 28, 2008 (NA)	No	Yes	Yes	No
Skate It	Exient Entertainment	Electronic Arts	November 19, 2008 (NA)	No	Yes	Yes	No
Slide Adventure MAGKID	Agenda	Nintendo	August 2, 2007 (JP)	Yes	No	No	No
Slingo Quest	Mac Play	MumboJumbo	October 7, 2008 (NA)	No	Yes	No	No
Sloane to MacHale no Nazo no Story	Level-5	Level-5	May 21, 2009 (JP)	Yes	No	No	No
Sloane to MacHale no Nazo no Story 2	Level-5	Level-5	September 3, 2009 (JP)	Yes	No	No	No
Smart Boy's: Gameroom	Starfish SD	505 Games, Starfish SD, UFO Interactive Games	April 26, 2007 (JP)	Yes	Yes	Yes	No
Smart Boy's: Gameroom 2	Tommo	UFO Interactive Games	September 29, 2009 (NA)	No	Yes	No	No
Smart Boy's: Toy Club	UFO Interactive Games	505 Games, Starfish SD, UFO Interactive Games	April 24, 2008 (EU)	Yes	Yes	Yes	No
Smart Boy's: Winter Wonderland	UFO Interactive Games	UFO Interactive Games	October 28, 2008 (NA)	No	Yes	No	No
Smart Girl's Playhouse Party	Starfish SD	UFO Interactive Games	October 19, 2010 (NA)	No	Yes	No	No
Smart Girl's: Magical Book Club	UFO Interactive Games	Tommo	November 11, 2005 (NA)	No	Yes	No	No
Smart Girl's: Party Games	UFO Interactive Games	505 Games, Starfish SD, Tommo	October 23, 2008 (NA)	Yes	Yes	Yes	No
Smart Girl's: Playhouse	Starfish SD	505 Games, Starfish SD, UFO Interactive Games	September 19, 2007 (NA)	Yes	Yes	Yes	No
Smart Girl's: Playhouse 2	Tommo	UFO Interactive Games	September 29, 2009 (NA)	No	Yes	No	No
Smart Girl's: Winter Wonderland	UFO Interactive Games	UFO Interactive Games	October 28, 2008 (NA)	No	Yes	No	No
Smart Kid's: Gameclub	UFO Interactive Games	UFO Interactive Games	November 16, 2007 (NA)	No	Yes	No	No
Smart Kid's: Mega Game Mix	Starfish SD	UFO Interactive Games	September 29, 2009 (NA)	No	Yes	No	No
Smart Kid's: Party Fun Pack	Starfish SD	UFO Interactive Games	October 14, 2008 (NA)	No	Yes	No	No
Smiley World: Island Challenge	Frame Studios Interactive	Zoo Digital Publishing	April 3, 2009 (PAL)	No	Yes	Yes	No
The Smurfs	Land Ho!	Ubisoft	July 19, 2011 (NA)	No	Yes	Yes	Yes
The Smurfs 2	WayForward	Ubisoft	July 23, 2013 (NA)	No	Yes	Yes	No
SNK vs. Capcom Card Fighters DS	SNK Playmore	SNK Playmore, Ignition Entertainment	December 14, 2006 (JP)	Yes	Yes	Yes	No
Snood 2: On Vacation	Rebellion	Destination Software, Zoo Digital Publishing	November 16, 2005 (NA)	No	Yes	Yes	No
Snoopy DS: Snoopy to Nakama Tachi ni Ai ni Ikou!	Square Enix	Square Enix	October 9, 2008 (JP)	Yes	No	No	No
Snoopy no Aiken DS: Chitte Okitai Inu no Koto - Inu no Nouryoku - Anata no Shitsuke	Hachikou Shouji	Hachikou Shouji	October 15, 2009 (JP)	Yes	No	No	No
Snoopy to Issho ni DS Eigo Lesson (Note: Primarily an English-learning application, though it includes a memory-matching activity and unlockable reward mini-games: dressing up, colouring and twenty picture puzzles.)	HuneX	Gakken	November 15, 2007 (JP)	Yes	No	No	No
So Blonde: Back to the Island	Wizarbox	DTP Entertainment	November 11, 2010 (PAL)	No	No	Yes	No
Sokoban DS	Braingame Publishing	RTL	September 25, 2008 (PAL)	No	No	Yes	No
Solatorobo: Red the Hunter	CyberConnect2	Bandai Namco Games, Xseed Games, Nintendo	October 28, 2010 (JP)	Yes	Yes	Yes	Yes
Solitaire Mahjong: Ancient China Adventure	Webfoot Technologies	White Park Bay	June 3, 2009 (PAL)	No	No	Yes	No
Solitaire Overload	Telegames	Telegames	October 26, 2007 (NA)	No	Yes	No	No
Solitaire Overload Plus; 3 in 1: Solitaire, Mahjong & Tangram^{EU}	Telegames	Telegames	October 15, 2010 (NA)	No	Yes	No	No
Solitaire: Ultimate Collection	Koch Media	Koch Media	April 11, 2008 (PAL)	No	No	Yes	No
Soma Bringer	Monolith Soft	Nintendo	February 28, 2008 (JP)	Yes	No	No	No
Sonic & Sega All-Stars Racing	Sumo Digital	Sega	November 11, 2010 (NA)	No	Yes	Yes	Yes
Sonic Chronicles: The Dark Brotherhood	BioWare	Sega	September 26, 2008 (PAL)	Yes	Yes	Yes	Yes
Sonic Classic Collection	Sonic Team	Sega	March 2, 2010 (NA)	No	Yes	Yes	Yes
Sonic Colors	Dimps	Sega	November 11, 2010 (AU)	Yes	Yes	Yes	Yes
Sonic Rush	Dimps, Sonic Team	Sega	November 15, 2005 (NA)	Yes	Yes	Yes	Yes
Sonic Rush Adventure	Dimps, Sonic Team	Sega	September 14, 2007 (PAL)	Yes	Yes	Yes	Yes
Sonny with a Chance	Altron	Disney Interactive Studios	March 16, 2010 (NA)	No	Yes	Yes	No
Sora no Otoshimono Forte: Dreamy Season	Kadokawa Shoten	Kadokawa Shoten	January 27, 2011 (JP)	Yes	No	No	No
The Sorcerer's Apprentice	Headstrong Games	Disney Interactive Studios	July 13, 2010 (NA)	No	Yes	Yes	No
Soreike! Anpanman: Baikinman no Daisakusen	Avit-Niigata	Agatsuma Entertainment	December 1, 2005 (JP)	Yes	No	No	No
Soroban DS (Note: Primarily an abacus-learning application, though it includes abacus-themed mini-games.)	Suzak	Four Winds	July 12, 2007 (JP)	Yes	No	No	No
Soukoku no Kusabi: Hiiro no Kakera 3 DS	Idea Factory	Idea Factory	August 25, 2011 (JP)	Yes	No	No	No
Soul Bubbles	Mekensleep	Eidos Interactive, Interchannel	June 10, 2008 (NA)	Yes	Yes	Yes	No
Soul Eater: Medusa no Inbou	Bandai Namco Games	Bandai Namco Games	October 23, 2008 (JP)	Yes	No	No	No
Souseiki Gadget Robo	Creative Core	Creative Core	December 11, 2008 (JP)	Yes	No	No	No
Space Bust-A-Move	Lancarse, Taito Corporation	Square Enix, Taito Corporation	December 18, 2008 (JP)	Yes	Yes	Yes	No
Space Camp	7 Studios	Activision	May 26, 2009 (NA)	No	Yes	Yes	Yes
Space Chimps	WayForward Technologies	Brash Entertainment	July 15, 2008 (NA)	No	Yes	Yes	No
Space Invaders Extreme	Taito Corporation	Square Enix, Taito Corporation	February 21, 2008 (JP)	Yes	Yes	Yes	No
Space Invaders Extreme 2	Project Just	Square Enix, Taito Corporation	March 26, 2009 (JP)	Yes	Yes	Yes	No
Space Invaders Revolution	Taito Corporation	Mastiff, Taito Corporation, Rising Star Games	March 24, 2005 (JP)	Yes	Yes	Yes	No
Spanisch Buddy	Spiral House	Deep Silver	June 30, 2009 (PAL)	No	No	Yes	No
Spanish for Everyone	Humagade	Activision	October 26, 2007 (NA)	No	Yes	No	No
Spectral Force Genesis	Idea Factory	CyberFront, Idea Factory, Nobilis	June 19, 2008 (JP)	Yes	Yes	Yes	No
Spectrobes	Jupiter	Disney Interactive Studios	March 6, 2007 (NA)	Yes	Yes	Yes	No
Spectrobes: Beyond the Portals	Jupiter	Disney Interactive Studios	October 7, 2008 (NA)	Yes	Yes	Yes	No
Speed Racer	Virtuous Games	Activision, Warner Bros. Interactive	May 6, 2008 (NA)	Yes	Yes	Yes	No
Spelling Challenges and More! Spellbound^{EU}	Supersonic Software	Crave Entertainment, 505 Games	September 24, 2007 (NA)	No	Yes	Yes	No
Spider-Man 2	Vicarious Visions	Activision	November 21, 2004 (NA)	Yes	Yes	Yes	Yes
Spider-Man 3	Vicarious Visions	Activision	May 4, 2007 (NA)	Yes	Yes	Yes	No
Spider-Man: Battle for New York	Torus Games	Activision	November 14, 2006 (NA)	No	Yes	Yes	No
Spider-Man: Edge of Time	Other Ocean Interactive	Activision	October 4, 2011 (NA)	No	Yes	Yes	No
Spider-Man: Friend or Foe	Artificial Mind and Movement	Activision	October 2, 2007 (NA)	No	Yes	Yes	No
Spider-Man: Shattered Dimensions	Griptonite Games	Activision	September 7, 2010 (NA)	No	Yes	Yes	Yes
Spider-Man: Web of Shadows	Griptonite Games	Activision	October 24, 2008 (NA)	No	Yes	Yes	No
The Spiderwick Chronicles	Stormfront Studios	Sierra Entertainment	February 5, 2008 (NA)	No	Yes	Yes	No
Spitfire Heroes: Tales of the Royal Air Force	Big John Games	Destineer	March 5, 2008 (NA)	No	Yes	No	No
SpongeBob SquarePants Featuring Nicktoons: Globs of Doom	Natsume Co., Ltd.	THQ	October 20, 2008 (NA)	No	Yes	Yes	Yes
SpongeBob SquarePants: Creature from the Krusty Krab	WayForward Technologies	THQ	October 18, 2006 (NA)	No	Yes	Yes	Yes
SpongeBob SquarePants: Plankton's Robotic Revenge	Behaviour Interactive	Activision	October 22, 2013 (NA)	No	Yes	Yes	Yes
SpongeBob SquarePants: The Yellow Avenger	Tantalus Media	THQ	November 7, 2005 (NA)	No	Yes	Yes	Yes
SpongeBob vs. The Big One: Beach Party Cook-Off	THQ	THQ	March 3, 2009 (NA)	No	Yes	Yes	Yes
SpongeBob's Atlantis SquarePantis	Altron	THQ	October 23, 2007 (NA)	Yes	Yes	Yes	Yes
SpongeBob's Boating Bash	Firebrand Games	THQ	March 2, 2010 (NA)	No	Yes	Yes	No
SpongeBob's Surf & Skate Roadtrip	Sabarasa Inc.	THQ	November 8, 2011 (NA)	No	Yes	Yes	Yes
SpongeBob's Truth or Square	Altron	THQ	October 26, 2009 (NA)	No	Yes	Yes	Yes
Spooky Story	Visual Imagination Software	bhv Software	March 25, 2009 (PAL)	No	No	Yes	No
Spore Creatures	Griptonite Games	EA Games	September 4, 2008 (PAL)	Yes	Yes	Yes	No
Spore Hero Arena	Maxis	EA Games	October 6, 2009 (NA)	Yes	Yes	Yes	Yes
Sports Collection	Ubisoft	Ubisoft	October 5, 2010 (NA)	No	Yes	Yes	No
The Sports Daishuugou	D3 Publisher	D3 Publisher	December 20, 2007 (JP)	Yes	No	No	No
Sprung	Ubisoft	Ubisoft	December 8, 2004 (NA)	No	Yes	Yes	No
Spy Kids: All the Time in the World	OneNine Studios	Majesco	August 12, 2011 (NA)	No	Yes	No	No
Spyro: Shadow Legacy	Amaze Entertainment	Vivendi Universal Games, Sierra Entertainment	October 18, 2005 (NA)	No	Yes	Yes	No
Squeeballs Party	Eiconic Games	Aksys Games	October 12, 2009 (NA)	No	Yes	Yes	Yes
Squinkies	HumanSoft	Activision	April 12, 2011 (NA)	No	Yes	Yes	No
Squinkies 2: Adventure Mall Surprize!	Activision	Activision	October 25, 2011 (NA)	No	Yes	No	No
Squishy Tank	Success	Natsume Inc.	July 24, 2008 (JP)	Yes	Yes	No	No
Star Fox Command	Q-Games, Nintendo EAD	Nintendo	August 3, 2006 (JP)	Yes	Yes	Yes	No
Star Trek: Tactical Assault	Quicksilver Software	Bethesda Softworks	October 26, 2006 (NA)	No	Yes	Yes	No
Star Wars Battlefront: Elite Squadron	n-Space	LucasArts	November 3, 2009 (NA)	No	Yes	Yes	Yes
Star Wars Episode III: Revenge of the Sith	Ubisoft Montreal	Ubisoft	April 5, 2005 (NA)	Yes	Yes	Yes	No
Star Wars: Lethal Alliance	Ubisoft Montreal	Ubisoft	July 6, 2006 (NA)	No	Yes	Yes	No
Star Wars: The Clone Wars - Jedi Alliance	LucasArts	LucasArts	November 11, 2008 (NA)	No	Yes	Yes	Yes
Star Wars: The Clone Wars - Republic Heroes	Krome Studios, LucasArts	LucasArts	September 15, 2009 (NA)	No	Yes	Yes	No
Star Wars: The Force Unleashed	n-Space	Activision, LucasArts	September 16, 2008 (NA)	Yes	Yes	Yes	No
Star Wars: The Force Unleashed II	LucasArts	LucasArts	October 26, 2010 (NA)	Yes	Yes	Yes	No
Steal Princess	Climax Entertainment	Marvelous Entertainment, Atlus, Rising Star Games	July 29, 2008 (JP)	Yes	Yes	Yes	No
Steel Horizon	Climax Group	Konami	March 20, 2007 (NA)	No	Yes	Yes	No
Sternenschweif: Das Geheimnis im Zauberwald	Quadriga Games	United Soft Media	May 27, 2009 (PAL)	No	No	Yes	No
Sternentanzer: Das geheimnisvolle Pferd	syncRage	Tivola Publishing GmbH	May 27, 2009 (PAL)	No	No	Yes	No
The Story of Noah's Ark	Razorback Developments	SouthPeak Games	November 8, 2009 (PAL)	No	Yes	No	No
Stratego: Next Edition	Ubisoft	Ubisoft	June 6, 2008 (PAL)	No	No	Yes	No
Strawberry Shortcake: Strawberryland Games	Gorilla Systems	The Game Factory	October 23, 2006 (NA)	No	Yes	Yes	No
Strawberry Shortcake: The Four Seasons Cake	The Game Factory	The Game Factory	November 9, 2007 (PAL)	No	Yes	Yes	No
Street Football	Koch Media	Koch Media	May 16, 2008 (PAL)	No	No	Yes	No
Street Football II	Koch Media	Deep Silver	2009 (PAL)	No	No	Yes	No
Strike Witches 2: Iyasu Naosu Punipunisuru	Kadokawa Shoten	Kadokawa Shoten	October 21, 2010 (JP)	Yes	No	No	No
Strike Witches: Sōkū no Dengekisen - Shin Taichou Funtousuru!	Russel	Russel	November 26, 2009 (JP)	Yes	No	No	No
Style Lab: Fashion Design	Ubisoft	Ubisoft	November 9, 2010 (NA)	No	Yes	No	No
Style Lab: Jewelry Design	Ubisoft	Ubisoft	November 10, 2009 (NA)	No	Yes	No	No
Style Lab: Makeover	Ubisoft	Ubisoft	November 10, 2009 (NA)	No	Yes	No	No
Style Savvy	Syn Sophia, Nintendo SPD	Nintendo	October 23, 2008 (JP)	Yes	Yes	Yes	Yes
Subbuteo	Artematica	505 Games	September 12, 2008 (PAL)	No	No	Yes	No
Successfully Learning: Concentration	Dreamcatcher	Dreamcatcher	2008 (PAL)	No	No	Yes	No
Sudoku Ball Detective	Whitebear	Playlogic	August 21, 2009 (NA)	No	Yes	Yes	No
Sudoku DS: Nikoli no Sudoku Ketteiban	AI	Hudson Soft	May 29, 2008 (JP)	Yes	No	No	No
Sudoku Mania	Frontline Studios	UFO Interactive Games	June 30, 2006 (NA)	No	Yes	No	No
Sudokuro	Crave Entertainment	Crave Entertainment	May 16, 2007 (NA)	No	Yes	Yes	No
Sugar Bunnies DS: Yume no Sweets Koubou	Takara Tomy	Takara Tomy	October 25, 2007 (JP)	Yes	No	No	No
Sugar Sugar Rune: Queen Shiken wa Dai Panic	Dimps Corporation	Bandai Namco Games	May 25, 2006 (JP)	Yes	No	No	No
Suikoden Tierkreis	Konami	Konami	December 18, 2008 (JP)	Yes	Yes	Yes	No
The Suiri: Shinshou 2009	Tomcat System	D3Publisher	March 5, 2009 (JP)	Yes	No	No	No
The Suite Life of Zack & Cody: Circle of Spies	Artificial Mind and Movement	Disney Interactive Studios	October 18, 2007 (NA)	No	Yes	Yes	No
The Suite Life of Zack & Cody: Tipton Trouble	Artificial Mind and Movement	Buena Vista Games	September 18, 2006 (NA)	No	Yes	No	No
Suite PreCure♪: Melody Collection	Bandai	Namco Bandai Games	August 25, 2011 (JP)	Yes	No	No	No
Sukashikashipanman DS: Shokotan koto Nakagawa Shouko Produce!	Interchannel	Interchannel	March 5, 2009 (JP)	Yes	No	No	No
Suki Desu Suzuki-kun!! 4-nin no Suzuki-kun	Idea Factory	Idea Factory	July 29, 2010 (JP)	Yes	No	No	No
Summon Night	Flight-Plan	Namco Bandai Games	April 24, 2008 (JP)	Yes	No	No	No
Summon Night 2	Flight-Plan	Namco Bandai Games	August 7, 2008 (JP)	Yes	No	No	No
Summon Night X: Tears Crown	Namco Bandai Games	Namco Bandai Games	November 5, 2009 (JP)	Yes	No	No	No
Summon Night: Twin Age	Flight-Plan	Atlus, Banpresto	August 30, 2007 (JP)	Yes	Yes	No	No
The Sun Crossword Challenge	Mercury Games	Mercury Games	April 18, 2008 (PAL)	No	No	Yes	No
Super Auto Salon: Custom Car Contest	Genterprise	Genterprise	April 9, 2009 (JP)	Yes	No	No	No
Super Black Bass: Dynamic Shot	Starfish SD	Eidos Interactive, Majesco, Starfish SD	November 24, 2005 (JP)	Yes	Yes	Yes	No
Super Collapse 3	Mac Play	MumboJumbo	October 30, 2007 (NA)	No	Yes	No	No
Super Dodgeball Brawlers	Access Co., Arc System Works	Arc System Works, Aksys Games	March 19, 2008 (JP)	Yes	Yes	No	No
Super Fahrschule	LiWO Production	Atari SA	May 26, 2008 (PAL)	No	No	Yes	No
Super Fruit Fall	Play It!	Play It!, Warner Bros. Interactive Entertainment	July 13, 2007 (PAL)	No	Yes	Yes	No
Super Fun Chess	White Park Bay	White Park Bay	February 25, 2009 (PAL)	No	No	Yes	No
Super Mario 64 DS	Nintendo	Nintendo	November 20, 2004 (NA)	Yes	Yes	Yes	Yes
Super Monkey Ball: Touch & Roll	Sega	Sega	December 1, 2005 (JP)	Yes	Yes	Yes	Yes
Super Princess Peach	Tose	Nintendo	October 20, 2005 (JP)	Yes	Yes	Yes	Yes
Super Robot Gakuen	Banpresto	Namco Bandai Games	August 27, 2009 (JP)	Yes	No	No	No
Super Robot Taisen OG Saga: Endless Frontier	Banpresto, Monolith Soft	Namco Bandai Games, Atlus	May 29, 2008 (JP)	Yes	Yes	No	No
Super Robot Taisen OG Saga: Endless Frontier Exceed	Banpresto, Monolith Soft	Namco Bandai Games	February 25, 2010 (JP)	Yes	No	No	No
Super Robot Wars K	Banpresto	Namco Bandai Games	April 2, 2009 (JP)	Yes	No	No	No
Super Robot Wars L	Banpresto	Namco Bandai Games	November 25, 2010 (NA)	Yes	No	No	No
Super Robot Wars OG Saga: The Lord of Elemental	Banpresto	Namco Bandai Games	May 27, 2010 (NA)	Yes	No	No	No
Super Robot Wars W	Banpresto	Banpresto	March 1, 2007 (JP)	Yes	No	No	No
Super Scribblenauts	5th Cell	Warner Bros. Interactive Entertainment, Konami	October 12, 2010 (NA)	Yes	Yes	Yes	Yes
Super Speed Machines	Midas Interactive Entertainment	Midas Interactive Entertainment	October 10, 2008 (PAL)	Yes	Yes	No	No
Superman Returns: The Videogame	EA Tiburon	EA Games	November 20, 2006 (NA)	No	Yes	Yes	No
Supermodel Makeover by Lauren Luke	Avanquest Software	Avanquest Software	December 18, 2009 (NA)	No	No	Yes	No
Surf's Up	Ubisoft	Ubisoft	May 30, 2007 (NA)	No	Yes	Yes	No
Survivor; Supervivientes^{EU}	Mindscape	Mindscape	April 6, 2009 (PAL)	No	Yes	Yes	No
Sushi Academy	DTP Entertainment	City Interactive	November 21, 2008 (PAL)	No	Yes	Yes	No
Sushi Go Round	SouthPeak Games	Miniclip	March 26, 2010 (NA)	No	Yes	No	No
Suske en Wiske: De Texas Rakkers	Triangle Studios	Foreign Media	July 23, 2009 (PAL)	No	No	Yes	No
Suujin Taisen	Mitchell	Nintendo	June 7, 2007 (JP)	Yes	No	No	No
Suzuki Super-Bikes II: Riding Challenge	Kuju Entertainment	Valcon Games	July 25, 2008 (NA)	No	Yes	No	No
Suzumiya Haruhi no Chokuretsu	Sega	Sega	May 28, 2009 (JP)	Yes	No	No	No
Sword World 2.0: Game Book DS	Broccoli	Broccoli	October 29, 2009 (JP)	Yes	No	No	No
Syberia	DreamCatcher Games	DreamCatcher Games	November 25, 2008 (NA)	No	Yes	Yes	No
System: Flaw	Visual Impact	Storm City Games	October 27, 2009 (NA)	No	Yes	Yes	No
T'choupi et ses Amis	Emme	Emme	2010 (PAL)	No	No	Yes	No
T.A.C. Heroes: Big Red One	Storm City Games	Storm City Games	March 31, 2010 (NA)	No	Yes	No	No
Tabaluga Grunland in Gefahr	Rocket Science Games	Atari SA	January 22, 2008 (PAL)	No	No	Yes	No
The Table Game	Yuki	D3Publisher	December 20, 2007 (JP)	Yes	No	No	No
Table Game Spirits	Tasuke	Tasuke	November 10, 2005 (JP)	Yes	No	No	No
Table Game Spirits 2	Tasuke	Tasuke	December 7, 2006 (JP)	Yes	No	No	No
Table Game Spirits V	Tasuke	Tasuke	June 25, 2009 (JP)	Yes	No	No	No
Tactical Guild	Ninja Studio	Success	August 28, 2008 (JP)	Yes	No	No	No
Tactics Layer: Ritina Guard Senki	Ninja Studio	D3 Publisher	May 28, 2009 (JP)	Yes	No	No	No
Tago Akira no Atama no Taisou Dai-1-Shuu: Nazotoki Sekai Isshuu Ryokou	Level 5	Level 5	June 18, 2009 (JP)	Yes	No	No	No
Tago Akira no Atama no Taisou Dai-2-Shuu: Ginga Oudan Nazotoki Adventure	Level 5	Level 5	June 18, 2009 (JP)	Yes	No	No	No
Tago Akira no Atama no Taisou Dai-3-Shuu: Fushigi no Kuni no Nazotoki Otogibanashi	Level 5	Level 5	October 8, 2009 (JP)	Yes	No	No	No
Tago Akira no Atama no Taisou Dai-4-Shuu: Time Machine no Nazotoki Daibouken	Level 5	Level 5	October 8, 2009 (JP)	Yes	No	No	No
Taiheiyou no Arashi DS	SystemSoft	SystemSoft	January 29, 2009 (JP)	Yes	No	No	No
Taiko no Tatsujin DS: Dororon! Youkai Daikessen!!	Namco Bandai Games	Namco Bandai Games	July 1, 2010 (JP)	Yes	No	No	No
Taiko no Tatsujin DS: Touch de Dokodon!	Namco Bandai Games	Namco Bandai Games	July 26, 2007 (JP)	Yes	No	No	No
Taisen!! Ka to Chan no Kororonpe!	Affect	DHM Interactive	November 13, 2008 (JP)	Yes	No	No	No
Taitsu-Kun: Joushi ga Okori-nikui Sawayaka Manners (Note: Primarily a business-etiquette learning application, though it includes a whack-a-mole-style mini-game called Joushi Tataki.)	Success	Success	April 12, 2007 (JP)	Yes	No	No	No
Tak: Mojo Mistake	Altron	THQ	October 13, 2008 (NA)	No	Yes	No	No
Tak: The Great Juju Challenge	Altron	THQ	September 19, 2005 (NA)	No	Yes	Yes	No
Take A Break's: Puzzle Bonanza	Ubisoft	Ubisoft	November 19, 2010 (PAL)	No	No	Yes	Yes
Take A Break's: Puzzle Master	Ubisoft	Ubisoft	November 13, 2009 (PAL)	No	No	Yes	Yes
The Tale of Despereaux	Brash Entertainment	Brash Entertainment	December 2, 2008 (NA)	No	Yes	Yes	No
Tales of Hearts	Namco Tales Studio	Namco Bandai Games	December 11, 2008 (JP)	Yes	No	No	No
Tales of Innocence	Alfa System	Namco Bandai Games	December 6, 2007 (JP)	Yes	No	No	No
Tales of the Tempest	Dimps, Namco Tales Studio	Namco Bandai Games	October 26, 2006 (JP)	Yes	No	No	No
Tales to Enjoy! Little Red Riding Hood	Enjoy Gaming	Enjoy Gaming	April 14, 2010 (PAL)	No	No	Yes	No
Tales to Enjoy! Puss in Boots	Enjoy Gaming	Enjoy Gaming	April 14, 2010 (PAL)	No	No	Yes	No
Tales to Enjoy! The Ugly Duckling	Enjoy Gaming	Enjoy Gaming	April 14, 2010 (PAL)	No	No	Yes	No
Tales to Enjoy! Three Little Pigs	Enjoy Gaming	Enjoy Gaming	April 14, 2010 (PAL)	No	No	Yes	No
Tamagotchi Collection	Dimps Corporation	Bandai Namco Games	November 10, 2011 (JP)	Yes	No	No	No
Tamagotchi Connection: Corner Shop	NanaOn-Sha	Atari, Bandai	September 15, 2005 (JP)	Yes	Yes	Yes	No
Tamagotchi Connection: Corner Shop 2	NanaOn-Sha	Atari, Bandai, Namco Bandai Games America	July 27, 2006 (JP)	Yes	Yes	Yes	No
Tamagotchi Connection: Corner Shop 3	NanaOn-Sha	Ataro, Namco Bandai Games	September 27, 2007 (JP)	Yes	Yes	Yes	No
Tamagotchi Kira Kira Omisecchi	Infinity	Bandai Namco Games	November 27, 2008 (JP)	Yes	No	No	No
Tamagotchi no Appare! Niji-Venture	Infinity	Bandai Namco Games	March 29, 2007 (JP)	Yes	No	No	No
Tamagotchi no Narikiri Challenge	Dimps Corporation	Bandai Namco Games	November 11, 2010 (JP)	Yes	No	No	No
Tamagotchi no Narikiri Channel	Dimps Corporation	Bandai Namco Games	November 5, 2010 (JP)	Yes	No	No	No
Tamagotchi no Pichi Pichi Omisecchi	Dimps Corporation	Bandai Namco Games	June 17, 2010 (JP)	Yes	No	No	No
Tangram Mania	505 Games	505 Games	February 14, 2008 (PAL)	No	No	Yes	No
Tank Beat	MileStone Inc.	MileStone Inc., O3 Entertainment, Midas Interactive	November 30, 2006 (JP)	Yes	Yes	Yes	No
Tanoshii Youchien: Kotoba to Asobo!	Compile Heart	Compile Heart	September 20, 2007 (JP)	Yes	No	No	No
Tantei Jinguuji Saburou DS: Akai Chou	WorkJam	Arc System Works	September 30, 2010 (JP)	Yes	No	No	No
Tantei Jinguuji Saburou DS: Fuserareta Shinjitsu	WorkJam	Arc System Works	March 19, 2009 (JP)	Yes	No	No	No
Tantei Jinguuji Saburou DS: Kienai Kokoro	WorkJam	Arc System Works	April 24, 2008 (JP)	Yes	No	No	No
Tantei Kibukawa Ryosuke Jiken Tan: The Masquerade Lullaby	Genki	Genki	March 24, 2005 (JP)	Yes	No	No	No
Tao's Adventure: Curse of the Demon Seal	Konami	Konami	December 22, 2005 (JP)	Yes	Yes	Yes	No
Team Batista no Eikou: Shinjitsu o Tsumugu 4-tsu no Karte	Hudson	Hudson	December 25, 2008 (JP)	Yes	No	No	No
Team Umizoomi	Black Lantern Studios	2K Play	November 1, 2011 (NA)	No	Yes	Yes	Yes
Tecktonik World Tour	Dancing Dots	Deep Silver	October 7, 2008 (PAL)	No	No	Yes	No
Tecmo Bowl: Kickoff	Polygon Magic	Tecmo	November 17, 2008 (NA)	No	Yes	No	No
Teenage Mutant Ninja Turtles 3: Mutant Nightmare	Konami	Konami	November 1, 2005 (NA)	No	Yes	Yes	No
Teenage Mutant Ninja Turtles: Arcade Attack	Ubisoft Nagoya	Ubisoft Entertainment	November 9, 2009 (NA)	No	Yes	Yes	Yes
Teenage Zombies: Invasion of the Alien Brain Thingys!	InLight Entertainment	Ignition Entertainment	March 28, 2008 (PAL)	No	Yes	Yes	No
Tele 7 Jeux Mots Croises	White Park Bay	White Park Bay	February 18, 2009 (PAL)	No	No	Yes	No
Tele 7 Jeux Mots Fleches	White Park Bay	White Park Bay	July 16, 2008 (PAL)	No	No	Yes	No
Telly Addicts	Ubisoft	Ubisoft	November 2, 2007 (PAL)	No	No	Yes	No
Tenchu: Dark Secret	Polygon Magic	From Software, Nintendo	April 6, 2006 (JP)	Yes	Yes	Yes	No
Tengai Makyō II: Manjimaru	Red Entertainment	Hudson Soft	March 9, 2006 (JP)	Yes	No	No	No
Tengen Toppa Gurren-Lagann	Konami	Konami	October 25, 2007 (JP)	Yes	No	No	No
Tenkaichi * Sengoku Lovers DS	Rocket Company	Rocket Company	October 7, 2010 (JP)	Yes	No	No	No
Tennis Elbow	Neko Entertainment	Neko Entertainment	2008 (PAL)	No	No	Yes	No
Tennis no Oji-Sama 2005: Crystal Drive	Konami	Konami	December 13, 2004 (JP)	Yes	No	No	No
Tennis no Oji-Sama Gyutto! Dokidoki Survival Umi to Yama no Love Passion	Konami	Konami	June 23, 2010 (JP)	Yes	No	No	No
Tennis no Oji-Sama: Doubles no Oji-Sama - Boys, Be Glorious!	Konami	Konami	March 26, 2009 (JP)	Yes	No	No	No
Tennis no Oji-Sama: Doubles no Oji-Sama - Girls, Be Gracious!	Konami	Konami	March 5, 2009 (JP)	Yes	No	No	No
Tennis no Oji-Sama: Driving Smash! Side Genius	Konami	Konami	December 20, 2007 (JP)	Yes	No	No	No
Tennis no Oji-Sama: Driving Smash! Side King	Konami	Konami	January 24, 2008 (JP)	Yes	No	No	No
Tennis no Oji-Sama: Motto Gakuensai no Ouji-Sama - More Sweet Edition	Konami	Konami	February 11, 2010 (JP)	Yes	No	No	No
Tetris DS	Nintendo	Nintendo	March 20, 2006 (NA)	Yes	Yes	Yes	Yes
Tetris Party Deluxe	Hudson Soft	Hudson Soft	May 25, 2010 (NA)	Yes	Yes	Yes	No
Tetsudou Musume DS	Takara Tomy	Takara Tomy	October 9, 2008 (JP)	Yes	No	No	No
Tetsudou Seminar: Oote Shitetsuhen (Note: Primarily a railway-reference and quiz application, though it includes Minitore, an activity for building and running model-railway layouts.)	Taito Corporation	Taito Corporation	January 22, 2009 (JP)	Yes	No	No	No
Texas Hold 'Em Poker Pack	Webfoot Technologies	Summitsoft Entertainment	March 11, 2006 (NA)	No	Yes	Yes	No
Texas Hold'em Poker	Skyworks Technologies	Majesco	November 8, 2005 (NA)	No	Yes	Yes	No
Theme Park	Bullfrog Productions	EA Games, Electronic Arts	March 15, 2007 (JP)	Yes	Yes	Yes	No
Theresia	WorkJam	Aksys Games, Arc System Works	September 11, 2008 (JP)	Yes	Yes	No	No
Theta	Vitei	Nintendo	September 6, 2007 (JP)	Yes	No	No	No
Think Again; Think: Training fur den Kopf - Fit fur den Job!^{DE} L'Entraineur Cerebral: Logique^{FR}	Interactive Arts	dtp Young Entertainment AG	August 6, 2009 (PAL)	No	No	Yes	No
Think: Train Your Senses; L'Entraineur Cerebral: Perception ^{FR}	Interactive Arts	dtp Young Entertainment AG, Mindscape	2009 (PAL)	No	No	Yes	No
thinkSMART; Think: Train Your Brain^{EU}	Eidos Interactive	Eidos Interactive	August 15, 2008 (PAL)	No	No	Yes	No
thinkSMART Crazy Machines: Wacky Problem Solving! Crazy Machines^{EU}	DTP Entertainment	DTP Entertainment	October 10, 2008 (EU)	No	Yes	Yes	No
thinkSMART Labyrinth	SVG Distribution	SVG Distribution	June 7, 2011 (EU)	No	No	Yes	No
thinkSMART: Chess for Kids	Kritzelkratz 3000	DTP Young Entertainment	November 19, 2007 (EU)	No	Yes	Yes	No
thinkSMART: Scotland Yard - Hunting Mr. X	Sproing	Mentor Interactive	June 7, 2011 (EU)	No	No	Yes	No
Thomas & Friends: Hero of the Rails	Barnstorm Games	Majesco	August 20, 2010 (EU)	No	No	Yes	No
Thor: God of Thunder	WayForward Technologies	Sega	April 28, 2011 (AU)	No	Yes	Yes	Yes
Thrillville: Off the Rails	Frontier Developments	LucasArts	October 9, 2007 (NA)	No	Yes	Yes	No
ThunderCats	Bandai Namco Games	Bandai Namco Games	October 30, 2012 (NA)	No	Yes	Yes	No
Tiger Woods PGA Tour 08	EA Sports	EA Sports	August 28, 2007 (NA)	No	Yes	Yes	No
Tiger Woods PGA Tour 2005	EA Sports	EA Sports	December 14, 2004 (NA)	Yes	Yes	Yes	No
Tim Stockdale's Riding Star	Eidos Interactive	Eidos Interactive	September 19, 2008 (PAL)	No	No	Yes	No
Time Ace	Trainwreck Studios	Konami	June 12, 2007 (NA)	No	Yes	No	No
Time Hollow	Tenky	Konami	March 19, 2008 (JP)	Yes	Yes	Yes	No
The Times Crossword Challenge	Sanuk Games	Sanuk Games	February 6, 2009 (PAL)	No	No	Yes	No
Timmy Time	Avanquest Software	Avanquest Software	August 19, 2011 (PAL)	No	No	Yes	No
TINCan! Escape	Visual Imagination Software	MumboJumbo	February 22, 2011 (NA)	No	Yes	No	No
Tingle's Balloon Fight DS	Nintendo	Nintendo	April 11, 2007 (JP)	Yes	No	No	No
Tinkerbell	Genius Sonority	Disney Interactive Studios	October 21, 2008 (NA)	Yes	Yes	Yes	Yes
Titanic Mystery	Purple Hills	Oxygen Games	December 19, 2009 (EU)	No	Yes	Yes	No
Titeuf Le Film	Deep Silver	Deep Silver	2011 (EU)	No	No	Yes	No
TKKG: Detektiv gesucht!	Morgen Studios	Sony BMG	October 25, 2007 (EU)	No	No	Yes	No
TMNT	Ubisoft Montreal	Ubisoft	March 20, 2007 (NA)	No	Yes	Yes	Yes
TNA Impact: Cross the Line	Point of View	SouthPeak Games	June 29, 2010 (NA)	No	Yes	No	No
To Love Ru Trouble: Waku Waku! Rinkan-gakkou Hen	Marvelous Entertainment	Marvelous Entertainment	August 28, 2008 (JP)	Yes	No	No	No
To-Fu Collection	HotGen	Rising Star Games	June 29, 2012 (PAL)	No	Yes	Yes	No
Tobidase! Kagaku-kun Chikyuu Daitanken! Nazo no Chinkai Seibutsu ni Idome!	Bandai Namco Games	Bandai Namco Games	March 3, 2011 (JP)	Yes	No	No	No
Tokimeki Memorial Girl's Side: 1st Love	Konami	Konami	March 15, 2007 (JP)	Yes	No	No	No
Tokimeki Memorial Girl's Side: 1st Love Plus	Konami	Konami	March 12, 2009 (JP)	Yes	No	No	No
Tokimeki Memorial Girl's Side: 2nd Season	Konami	Konami	February 14, 2008 (JP)	Yes	No	No	No
Tokimeki Memorial Girl's Side: 3rd Story	Konami	Konami	June 24, 2010 (JP)	Yes	No	No	No
Tokumei Sentai Go-Busters; Power Rangers: Go-Busters^{KOR}	Aspect	Bandai Namco Games	September 27, 2012 (JP)	Yes	No	No	No
Tokyo Beat Down	Success	Atlus, Success	September 18, 2008 (JP)	Yes	Yes	No	No
Tokyo Friend Park II DS	Rocket Company	Rocket Company	November 30, 2006 (JP)	Yes	No	No	No
Tokyo Majin Gakuen: Kenfuuchou	Asmik Ace Entertainment, Inc	Marvelous Entertainment	August 21, 2008 (JP)	Yes	No	No	No
Tokyo Odaiba Casino	Success	Success	February 21, 2008 (JP)	Yes	No	No	No
Tokyo Twilight Busters: Kindan no Ikenie Teito Jigokuhen	MBA International	Starfish SD	October 14, 2010 (JP)	Yes	No	No	No
Tom and Jerry Tales	Sensory Sweep Studios	Eidos Interactive, Warner Bros. Interactive Entertainment	November 7, 2006 (NA)	No	Yes	Yes	No
Tom Clancy's EndWar	Ubisoft Montreal	Ubisoft	November 4, 2008 (NA)	No	Yes	Yes	No
Tom Clancy's Splinter Cell: Chaos Theory	Ubisoft	Ubisoft	June 28, 2005 (NA)	No	Yes	Yes	Yes
Tomb Raider: Legend	Crystal Dynamics	Eidos Interactive	November 10, 2006 (PAL)	No	Yes	Yes	Yes
Tomb Raider: Underworld	Santa Cruz Games	Eidos Interactive	November 18, 2008 (NA)	No	Yes	Yes	Yes
Tomodachi Collection	Nintendo SPD	Nintendo	June 18, 2009 (JP)	Yes	No	No	No
Tomyka Hero: Rescue Force DS	Takara Tomy	Takara Tomy	November 20, 2008 (JP)	Yes	No	No	No
Tongari Boushi to Mahou no Omise	Konami	Konami	November 11, 2010 (JP)	Yes	No	No	No
Tongari Boushi to Oshare na Mahou Tsukai	Konami	Konami	December 10, 2011 (JP)	Yes	No	No	No
Tony Hawk's American Sk8land	Vicarious Visions	Activision	November 16, 2005 (NA)	No	Yes	Yes	Yes
Tony Hawk's Downhill Jam	Vicarious Visions	Activision	October 24, 2006 (NA)	No	Yes	Yes	Yes
Tony Hawk's Motion	Creat Studios	Activision	November 18, 2008 (NA)	No	Yes	Yes	Yes
Tony Hawk's Proving Ground	Vicarious Visions	Activision	October 15, 2007 (NA)	No	Yes	Yes	Yes
Toon-doku	Majesco	Eidos Interactive, Majesco	October 26, 2007 (PAL)	No	Yes	Yes	No
Tootuff Mission Nadia	Atari	Atari	February 10, 2006 (PAL)	No	No	Yes	No
Tootuff's World; Le Monde de Titeuf^{FR}	Atari SA	Atari SA	December 3, 2007 (EU)	No	No	Yes	No
Tootuff: Megafunland	Atari	Atari	October 31, 2008 (PAL)	No	No	Yes	No
Top Gun	InterActive Vision Games	505 Games, Mastiff, Taito Corporation	February 23, 2006 (JP)	Yes	Yes	Yes	Yes
Top Model Academy	Independent Arts	SevenOne Intermedia	2011 (PAL)	No	No	Yes	No
Top Spin 2	Indie Built	2K Sports	March 29, 2006 (NA)	No	Yes	Yes	No
Top Spin 3	PAM Development	2K Sports	June 23, 2008 (NA)	No	Yes	Yes	No
Top Trumps Adventures: Dogs and Dinosaurs	Ironstone Partners	Ubisoft	October 12, 2007 (PAL)	No	No	Yes	No
Top Trumps Adventures: Horror and Predators	Ubisoft	Ubisoft	October 12, 2007 (PAL)	No	No	Yes	No
Top Trumps: Doctor Who	Ironstone Partners	Eidos Interactive	May 16, 2008 (PAL)	No	No	Yes	Yes
Top Trumps: NBA All Stars	Ironstone Partners	Ubisoft	October 24, 2012 (PAL)	No	No	Yes	No
Tornado	Skonec	Ignition Entertainment	September 30, 2008 (NA)	No	Yes	Yes	No
Totally Spies! 2: Undercover	Atari	Atari	November 27, 2006 (NA)	No	Yes	Yes	Yes
Totally Spies! 3: Secret Agents	Atari	Atari	October 18, 2007 (NA)	No	Yes	Yes	Yes
Totally Spies! 4: Autour du Monde	OUAT Entertainment	Ubisoft	November 13, 2008 (PAL)	No	No	Yes	No
Totally Spies! My Secret Diary (Note: Primarily a diary and organiser application, though it includes three mini-games.); Totally Spies! Mon Agenda Secret^{FR}	OUAT Entertainment	Ubisoft	June 4, 2009 (PAL)	No	No	Yes	No
Tottadoo! Yoiko no Mujintou Seikatsu	Digifloyd	Bandai Namco Games	April 3, 2008 (JP)	Yes	No	No	No
Tottoko Hamtaro: Nazo Nazo Q Kumonoue no ? Jou	AlphaDream	Nintendo	December 1, 2005 (JP)	Yes	No	No	No
Touch 'N' Play Collection	O-Games	O-Games	November 5, 2010 (PAL)	No	Yes	Yes	Yes
Touch Darts	Sega	Agetec, Sega	June 15, 2007 (PAL)	No	Yes	Yes	No
Touch de Manzai! Megami no Etsubo DS	New	Ertain	June 29, 2006 (JP)	Yes	No	No	No
Touch de Rakushou! Pachi-Slot Sengen: Rio de Carnival	Net Corporation	Tecmo	September 8, 2005 (JP)	Yes	No	No	No
Touch de Tanoshimu Hyakunin Isshu: DS Shigureden	Nintendo	Nintendo	December 14, 2006 (JP)	Yes	No	No	No
Touch de Zuno! DS	Sega	Sega	January 17, 2008 (JP)	Yes	No	No	No
Touch Detective	BeeWorks	505 Game Street, Atlus, Success	April 13, 2006 (JP)	Yes	Yes	Yes	No
Touch Detective 2 ½	BeeWorks	505 Games, Atlus, Success	May 24, 2007 (JP)	Yes	Yes	Yes	No
Touch Mechanic	Kando Games	Aspyr Media, Nintendo	March 24, 2009 (NA)	No	Yes	Yes	No
Touch Panic^{Mawashite Tsunageru Touch Panic}	Aki Corp.	Nintendo	May 25, 2006 (JP)	Yes	No	No	No
Touch the Dead	Dream On Studios	Eidos Interactive	May 16, 2007 (NA)	No	Yes	Yes	No
Touch! Go-Stop DS	CTGAME Entertainment	CTGAME Entertainment	May 29, 2008 (KR)	Yes	No	No	No
Touch: Man to Man - Gicho Yeongeo	Daewon Media	Daewon Media	2010 (KO)	Yes	No	No	No
TouchMaster	Midway Games	Midway Games	June 25, 2007 (NA)	No	Yes	Yes	No
TouchMaster 2	Midway Games	Midway Games	November 3, 2008 (NA)	No	Yes	Yes	No
TouchMaster 3	Midway Games	Warner Bros. Interactive Entertainment	October 23, 2009 (NA)	No	Yes	Yes	Yes
TouchMaster Connect	Midway Games	Warner Bros. Interactive	December 3, 2010 (EU)	No	Yes	Yes	Yes
Toudai Shogi: Meijinsen Dojo DS	Mainichi Communications	Mainichi Communications	April 21, 2011 (JP)	Yes	No	No	No
Toudou Ryuunosuke Tantei Nikki: Aen no Koufune	althi Inc.	fonfun	March 26, 2009 (JP)	Yes	No	No	No
Toudou Ryuunosuke Tantei Nikki: Kohakuiro no Yuigon	althi Inc.	fonfun	December 18, 2008 (JP)	Yes	No	No	No
Touhai Densetsu - Akagi DS: Yami ni Maiorita Tensai	Culture Brain	Culture Brain	August 9, 2007 (JP)	No	No	Yes	No
The Tower DS	DigiToys	DigiToys	June 26, 2008 (JP)	Yes	No	No	No
Toy Shop	Gameinvest, SeedStudios	Majesco	April 29, 2008 (NA)	No	Yes	Yes	No
Trace Memory; Another Code: Two Memories^{EU} Another Code: Futatsu no Kioku^{JP}	Cing	Nintendo	February 24, 2005 (JP)	Yes	Yes	Yes	Yes
TrackMania DS	Firebrand Games	Atlus, Focus Home Interactive	November 14, 2008 (PAL,NA)	No	Yes	Yes	Yes
TrackMania Turbo: Build to Race	Firebrand Games	Atlus, Focus Home Interactive	September 24, 2010 (EU)	No	Yes	Yes	No
Transformers Revenge of the Fallen: Autobots	Vicarious Visions	Activision	June 23, 2009 (NA)	No	Yes	Yes	Yes
Transformers Revenge of the Fallen: Decepticons	Vicarious Visions	Activision	June 23, 2009 (NA)	No	Yes	Yes	Yes
Transformers: Animated	Behaviour Interactive	Activision	October 21, 2008 (NA)	No	Yes	Yes	Yes
Transformers: Autobots	Vicarious Visions	Activision	June 19, 2007 (NA)	No	Yes	Yes	Yes
Transformers: Dark of the Moon - Autobots	Behaviour Interactive	Activision	June 14, 2011 (NA)	No	Yes	Yes	Yes
Transformers: Dark of the Moon - Decepticons	Behaviour Interactive	Activision	June 14, 2011 (NA)	No	Yes	Yes	Yes
Transformers: Decepticons	Vicarious Visions	Activision	June 19, 2007 (NA)	No	Yes	Yes	Yes
Transformers: Prime – The Game	Altron	Activision	October 30, 2012 (NA)	No	Yes	Yes	Yes
Transformers: War for Cybertron - Autobots	Vicarious Visions	Activision	June 22, 2010 (NA)	No	Yes	Yes	Yes
Transformers: War for Cybertron - Decepticons	Vicarious Visions	Activision	June 22, 2010 (NA)	No	Yes	Yes	Yes
The Trash Pack	Activision	Activision	October 30, 2012 (NA)	No	Yes	No	Yes
Trauma Center: Under the Knife	Atlus	Atlus, Nintendo	June 16, 2005 (JP)	Yes	Yes	Yes	Yes
Trauma Center: Under the Knife 2	Atlus	Atlus	July 1, 2008 (NA)	Yes	Yes	No	No
Travel Coach: Europe 1 (Note: Primarily a travel-guide and language-learning application, though it includes five country-themed mini-games in addition to its country quizzes.)	HMH Hamburger Medien Haus	HMH Hamburger Medien Haus	May 22, 2008 (PAL)	No	No	Yes	No
Travel Coach: Europe 2 (Note: Primarily a travel-guide and language-learning application, though it includes country-themed mini-games alongside its quizzes.)	HMH Hamburger Medien Haus	HMH Hamburger Medien Haus	November 20, 2008 (PAL)	No	No	Yes	No
Travel Coach: Europe 3 (Note: Primarily a travel-guide and language-learning application, though it includes country-themed mini-games alongside its quizzes.)	HMH Hamburger Medien Haus	HMH Hamburger Medien Haus	November 20, 2008 (PAL)	No	No	Yes	No
Travel Games For Dummies	Beanbag Studios	Electronic Arts	October 28, 2008 (NA)	No	Yes	Yes	No
Treasure Gaust: Gaust Diver Crimson Red	Namco Bandai Games	Namco Bandai Games	July 5, 2007 (JP)	Yes	No	No	No
Treasure Gaust: Gaust Diver Deep Purple	Namco Bandai Games	Namco Bandai Games	July 5, 2007 (JP)	Yes	No	No	No
Treasure Master	MSL	MSL	December 13, 2011 (PAL)	No	No	Yes	No
Treasure Report: Kikai Jikake no Isan	Namco Bandai Games	Namco Bandai Games	May 26, 2011 (JP)	Yes	No	No	No
Treasure World	Aspyr Media	Aspyr Media	July 2, 2009 (NA)	No	Yes	No	No
The Treasures of Montezuma	Most Wanted Entertainment	O-Games, Foreign Media	June 11, 2010 (PAL)	No	Yes	Yes	No
The Treasures of Montezuma 2	Goodbye Galaxy Games	Licensed 4U	June 29, 2012 (PAL)	No	No	Yes	No
Trick DS-ban: Kakushi Kami no Sumu Yakata	Konami	Konami	May 13, 2010 (JP)	Yes	No	No	No
Trioncube	Namco Bandai Games	Atari, Namco Bandai Games	August 3, 2006 (JP)	Yes	Yes	Yes	No
TRON: Evolution	n-Space, Inc.	Disney Interactive Studios, Inc.	December 7, 2010 (?)	?	Yes	Yes	?
Tropical Lost Island	Media Sales & Licensing	Media Sales & Licensing	November 26, 2010 (PAL)	No	No	Yes	Yes
Tropix	Capcom	Capcom	November 4, 2008 (NA)	No	Yes	No	No
True Swing Golf	Technology and Entertainment Software	Nintendo	November 10, 2005 (JP)	Yes	Yes	Yes	No
The Trump	D3 Publisher	D3 Publisher	June 22, 2006 (JP)	Yes	No	No	No
Tsubasa Chronicle	Arika	Arika	October 27, 2005 (JP)	Yes	No	No	No
Tsubasa Chronicle Vol. 2	Arika	Arika	April 20, 2006 (JP)	Yes	No	No	No
Tsukibito	SNK Playmore	SNK Playmore	August 6, 2009 (JP)	Yes	No	No	No
Tsumiki: The Infernal Tower	Red Entertainment	Red Entertainment, Nobilis	August 30, 2007 (JP)	Yes	No	Yes	No
Turbo Super Stunt Squad	Monkey Bar Games	D3 Publisher	July 16, 2013 (NA)	No	Yes	Yes	Yes
Turn It Around!	505 Games, Majesco	505 Game Street, Majesco, Taito Corporation	July 20, 2006 (JP)	Yes	Yes	Yes	No
TV Anime: Fairy Tail Gekitou! Madoushi Kessen	AI	Hudson	July 22, 2010 (JP)	Yes	No	No	No
Twilight Syndrome: Kinjiratera Toshi Densetsu	Spike	Spike	July 24, 2008 (JP)	Yes	No	No	No
Uchi no 3 Shimai DS	Culture Brain	Culture Brain	April 12, 2008 (JP)	Yes	No	No	No
Uchi no 3 Shimai DS 2: 3 Shimai no Dekake Daisakusen	Culture Brain	Culture Brain	November 12, 2009 (JP)	Yes	No	No	No
Uchi no 3 Shimai no Karaoke Utagassen	Culture Brain	Culture Brain	September 12, 2010 (JP)	Yes	No	No	No
Uchida Yasuou DS Mystery: Meitantei Asami Mitsuhiko Series: Fukutoshin Renzoku Satsujin Jiken	D3Publisher	D3Publisher	February 26, 2009 (JP)	Yes	No	No	No
Ukkari o Nakusō! Bunshō Yomi Training	Intelligent Systems	Benesse	June 28, 2007 (JP)	Yes	No	No	No
Ultimate Band	Fall Line Studios	Disney Interactive Studios	November 4, 2008 (NA)	No	Yes	Yes	No
Ultimate Card Games	Cosmigo	Telegames	November 8, 2011 (NA)	No	Yes	No	No
Ultimate Game Room	FrontLine Studios	Majesco	June 30, 2009 (NA)	No	Yes	No	No
Ultimate Mortal Kombat	Other Ocean Interactive	Midway Games	November 12, 2007 (NA)	No	Yes	Yes	No
Ultimate Puzzle Games: Sudoku Edition	Telegames	Telegames, White Park Bay	July 24, 2007 (NA)	No	Yes	Yes	No
Ultimate Spider-Man	Vicarious Visions	Activision, Taito Corporation	May 25, 2006 (JP)	Yes	Yes	Yes	Yes
Umezawa Yukari no Yasashii Igo	Mainichi Communications	Mainichi Communications	January 31, 2008 (JP)	Yes	No	No	No
Umibe de Reach! DS	Mainichi Communications	Mainichi Communications	August 28, 2008 (JP)	Yes	No	No	No
Umihara Kawase Shun: Second Edition Kanzenban	Suzak	Genterprise	October 29, 2009 (JP)	Yes	No	No	No
Umiuru to Sudoku Shiyo!	Genterprise	Genterprise	September 25, 2008 (JP)	Yes	No	No	No
Undercover: Dual Motives	Sproing Interactive Media	DTP Entertainment, Eidos Interactive	April 25, 2008 (PAL)	No	No	Yes	No
Underground Pool	FrontLine Studios	UFO Interactive Games	January 26, 2007 (NA)	No	Yes	Yes	No
Underwater Attack	UFO Interactive Games	UFO Interactive Games	July 15, 2008 (NA)	No	Yes	No	No
Unknown Soldier: Mokuba no Houkou	Tamsoft	D3Publisher	October 2, 2008 (JP)	Yes	No	No	No
Uno / Skip-Bo / Uno Freefall	Black Lantern Studios	Destination Software	November 16, 2006 (NA)	No	Yes	Yes	No
Uno 52	Destination Software	Destination Software	October 3, 2006 (NA)	No	Yes	Yes	No
Unō Ikusei: IQ Breeder: Pet to Nakayoku IQ Lesson	MegaHouse	MegaHouse	November 22, 2007 (JP)	Yes	No	No	No
Unō no Tatsujin: Hirameki Kosodate My Angel	Namco Bandai Games	Namco Bandai Games	September 7, 2006 (JP)	Yes	No	No	No
Unō no Tatsujin: Soukai! Machigai Museum 2	Bandai Namco Games	Bandai Namco Games	March 1, 2007 (JP)	Yes	No	No	No
Unō Tanren UnoTan DS: Shichida Shiki Otona no Shun Kan Training	Interchannel	Interchannel	February 22, 2007 (JP)	Yes	No	No	No
Unsolved Crimes	Now Production	Atari, Empire Interactive	September 16, 2008 (NA)	No	Yes	Yes	No
The Urbz: Sims in the City	Griptonite Games	EA Games	November 17, 2004 (NA)	Yes	Yes	Yes	No
Urusei Yatsura: Endless Summer	Marvelous Entertainment	Marvelous Entertainment	October 20, 2005 (JP)	Yes	No	No	No
USA Today Crossword Challenge	Destineer	Destineer	May 30, 2008 (NA)	No	Yes	No	No
USA Today Puzzle Craze	Destineer	Destineer	February 10, 2009 (NA)	No	Yes	No	No
Usavich: Game no Jikan	Cattle Call	Bandai Namco Games	December 8, 2011 (JP)	Yes	No	No	No
Utacchi!!	Amble	Konami	February 25, 2010 (JP)	Yes	No	No	No
Uwasa no Midori-kun!! Futari no Midori!?	Idea Factory	Idea Factory	August 21, 2008 (JP)	Yes	No	No	No
Uwasa no Midori-kun!! Natsu Iro Striker	Idea Factory	Idea Factory	September 20, 2007 (JP)	Yes	No	No	No
Valentines Day	Phoenix Games	Phoenix Games	August 28, 2008 (PAL)	No	No	Yes	No
Valkyrie Profile: Covenant of the Plume	tri-Ace	Square Enix	November 1, 2008 (JP)	Yes	Yes	Yes	No
Vampire Knight DS	D3 Publisher	D3 Publisher	January 29, 2009 (JP)	Yes	No	No	No
Vampire Legends: Power of Three; Witches & Vampires: Ghost Pirates of Ashburry^{EU}	Smack Down Productions	THQ	June 29, 2010 (PAL)	No	Yes	Yes	No
Vampire Mansion: Linda Hyde	Easy Interactive	Tivola	September 1, 2011 (PAL)	No	No	Yes	No
Vampire Moon: The Mystery of the Hidden Sun	City Interactive	City Interactive	October 8, 2010 (PAL)	No	Yes	Yes	No
Vegas Casino High 5!	Neko Entertainment	Bold Games, Neko Entertainment	April 27, 2007 (PAL)	No	Yes	Yes	No
Veggy World	Jack of All Games	Maximum Family Games	September 7, 2011 (NA)	No	Yes	No	No
Victorious: Hollywood Arts Debut	Behaviour Interactive	D3 Publisher	November 15, 2011 (NA)	No	Yes	Yes	No
Victorious: Taking the Lead	1st Playable Productions	D3Publisher	November 13, 2012 (NA)	No	Yes	Yes	No
Viewtiful Joe: Double Trouble!	Clover Studio	Capcom, Nintendo	November 2, 2005 (JP)	Yes	Yes	Yes	No
VIP News	exozet	dtp Young Entertainment AG	April 21, 2010 (PAL)	No	No	Yes	No
Virtual Villagers: A New Home	Last Day of Work	DTP Entertainment	April 27, 2010 (NA)	No	Yes	Yes	No
Visual Logic Training	Aruba Games	RTL	September 22, 2008 (PAL)	No	No	Yes	No
Vitamin X Evolution	D3 Publisher	D3 Publisher	March 27, 2008 (JP)	Yes	No	No	No
Vitamin Y	D3 Publisher	D3 Publisher	October 30, 2008 (JP)	Yes	No	No	No
Viva Piñata: Pocket Paradise	Rare	THQ	September 5, 2008 (PAL)	No	Yes	Yes	No
Wacky Races: Crash & Dash	Farmind	Eidos Interactive, Warner Bros. Interactive Entertainment	June 17, 2008 (NA)	No	Yes	Yes	No
Waku Waku DS 1 Nensei	Shingakusha	Shingakusha	December 20, 2007 (JP)	Yes	No	No	No
Wan Nyan Doubutsu Byouin	Columbia Music Entertainment	Columbia Music Entertainment	December 20, 2007 (JP)	Yes	No	No	No
Wantame Music Channel: Doko Demo Style	Capcom	Capcom	November 22, 2007 (JP)	Yes	No	No	No
Wantame Uranai Channel	Capcom	Capcom	August 9, 2007 (JP)	Yes	No	No	No
Wantame Variety Channel	Capcom	Capcom	August 7, 2008 (JP)	Yes	No	No	No
Wappy Dog	Activision	Activision	November 8, 2011 (NA)	No	Yes	Yes	No
Warhammer 40,000: Squad Command	RedLynx	THQ	December 6, 2007 (AU)	No	Yes	Yes	Yes
Wario: Master of Disguise	Suzak Inc.	Nintendo	January 18, 2007 (JP)	Yes	Yes	Yes	Yes
WarioWare D.I.Y.	Intelligent Systems; Nintendo SPD	Nintendo	April 29, 2009 (JP)	Yes	Yes	Yes	Yes
WarioWare: Touched!	Intelligent Systems	Nintendo	December 2, 2004 (JP)	Yes	Yes	Yes	Yes
Was ist was: Lost Treasure - The Adventure Game	Tessloff, Kritzelkratz 3000	Kiddinx	November 7, 2008 (EU)	No	No	Yes	No
Was ist was: The Earth Adventure	Tessloff, Kritzelkratz 3000	Kiddinx	September 30, 2009 (EU)	No	No	Yes	No
Watashi no Cake-Ya-San: Happy Patissier Life	Culture Brain	Culture Brain	August 2, 2012 (JP)	Yes	No	No	No
Watashi no Relaxuma	Rocket Company	Rocket Company	April 12, 2007 (JP)	Yes	No	No	No
The Water Horse: Legend of the Deep	Blast! Entertainment	Blast! Entertainment	April 25, 2008 (EU)	No	No	Yes	No
Wedding Dash	Zoo Games	Zoo Games	November 13, 2009 (NA)	No	Yes	No	No
Wedding Planner: Dream Weddings Guaranteed	DTP Entertainment	DTP Entertainment	December 3, 2010 (PAL)	No	No	Yes	No
Wendy: Das PferdeHospital	Caipirinha Games	astragon	January 20, 2009 (PAL)	No	No	Yes	No
Western Riding Academy; My Western Horse^{EU}	Snapdragon	Destineer	October 2, 2008 (PAL)	No	Yes	Yes	Yes
Whac-A-Mole	Activision	Activision, Zoo Digital Publishing	September 21, 2005 (NA)	No	Yes	Yes	No
What's Cooking? with Jamie Oliver	Atari	Atari	October 21, 2008 (NA)	No	Yes	Yes	No
Wheel of Fortune	Griptonite Games	THQ	November 2, 2010 (NA)	No	Yes	No	No
Where in the World is Carmen Sandiego?	Strass Productions	Mindscape	August 10, 2009 (PAL)	No	No	Yes	No
Where the Wild Things Are	Amaze	Warner Bros. Interactive Entertainment	October 13, 2009 (NA)	No	Yes	No	No
Where's Waldo? The Fantastic Journey	Ludia	Ubisoft	September 22, 2009 (NA)	No	Yes	No	No
Who Wants To Be A Millionaire (US Edition)	Ubisoft	Ubisoft	October 5, 2010 (NA)	No	Yes	No	No
Who Wants To Be A Millionaire - 1st Edition	Ubisoft	Ubisoft	November 2, 2007 (PAL)	No	No	Yes	No
Who Wants To Be A Millionaire - 2nd Edition	Ubisoft	Ubisoft	November 28, 2008 (PAL)	No	No	Yes	No
Wi-Fi Taiou Gensen Table Game DS	Hudson Soft	Hudson Soft	August 2, 2007 (JP)	Yes	No	No	No
Wi-Fi Taiou Morita Shogi DS	Hudson Soft	Hudson Soft	February 8, 2007 (JP)	Yes	No	No	No
Wi-Fi Taiou Yakuman DS	Nintendo	Nintendo	September 14, 2006 (JP)	Yes	No	No	No
Wickie und die starken Manner; Vicky the Viking^{EU}	Intenium	Intenium	September 18, 2009 (PAL)	No	No	Yes	No
Wickie und die starken Manner Teil 2: Wiedersehen in Flake; Vicky the Viking part 2^{EU}	Intenium	Intenium	August 19, 2011 (PAL)	No	No	Yes	No
Wiffle Ball	Skyworks Technologies	Destination Software	March 12, 2007 (PAL)	No	Yes	Yes	No
The Wild West	Happy Happening	Majesco	August 28, 2007 (NA)	No	Yes	No	No
Will O' Wisp DS	Idea Factory	Idea Factory	March 26, 2009 (JP)	Yes	No	No	No
Willi Wills Wissen: Notruf - Retter im Einsatz	Promotion Software	United Soft Media	February 12, 2009 (PAL)	No	No	Yes	No
Willkommen in der Steinzeit - Uberleben ist Alles!	RockAByte	Tivola	August 17, 2010 (PAL)	No	No	Yes	No
Windy x Windam	Success	DHM Interactive, Success	July 31, 2008 (JP)	Yes	Yes	No	No
Winner's Circle	Genki	Genki	October 18, 2007 (JP)	Yes	No	No	No
WinneToons: Die Legende vom Schatz im Silbersee	Independent Arts	dtp Young Entertainment	October 12, 2007 (PAL)	No	No	Yes	No
Winter in Blue Mountain	Ravn Studio	PAN Vision	November 11, 2011 (PAL)	No	No	Yes	No
Winter Sports 2: The Next Challenge	49 Games	Conspiracy Entertainment, RTL Games	November 25, 2008 (NA)	No	Yes	Yes	No
Winter's Tail	Triangle Studios	Crave	November 24, 2009 (NA)	No	Yes	No	No
Winx Club: Believix in You!	ForwardGames	Namco Bandai Games	February 26, 2010 (PAL)	No	No	Yes	No
Winx Club: Magical Fairy Party	1st Playable Productions	D3Publisher	October 30, 2012 (PAL)	No	Yes	Yes	No
Winx Club: Mission Echantrix	Powerhead Games	Konami	March 7, 2008 (PAL)	No	Yes	Yes	No
WinX Club: Rockstars	Rainbow S.p.A.	Namco Bandai Games	November 26, 2010 (PAL)	No	No	Yes	No
Winx Club: Saving Alfea	Little Orbit	Bandai Namco Games	October 17, 2014 (EU)	No	Yes	Yes	No
Winx Club: The Quest for the Codex	Powerhead Games	Konami	November 13, 2006 (NA)	No	Yes	Yes	No
Winx Club: Your Magic Universe	Powerhead Games	Konami	September 1, 2009 (PAL)	No	No	Yes	No
Wipeout 2	Behaviour Interactive	Activision	October 11, 2011 (NA)	No	Yes	No	No
Wipeout: The Game	A.C.R.O.N.Y.M. Games	Activision	June 22, 2010 (NA)	No	Yes	No	No
WireWay	Now Production	Konami	November 3, 2009 (NA)	Yes	Yes	Yes	No
Witch's Wish	Tamsoft	Natsume Inc.	May 26, 2010 (JP)	Yes	Yes	No	No
Witches & Vampires: The Secrets of Ashburry	Smack Down Productions	Conspiracy Entertainment	October 8, 2010 (PAL)	No	Yes	Yes	No
The Wizard of Oz: Beyond the Yellow Brick Road	Media.Vision	D3 Publisher, Xseed Games	December 25, 2008 (JP)	Yes	Yes	No	No
Wizardry Asterisk: Hiiro no Fuuin	Starfish SD	Starfish SD	December 29, 2005 (JP)	Yes	No	No	No
Wizardry: Boukyaku no Isan	Genterprise	Genterprise	July 29, 2010 (JP)	Yes	No	No	No
Wizardry: Inochi no Kusabi	Genterprise	Genterprise	November 19, 2009 (JP)	Yes	No	No	No
Wizards of Waverly Place	Disney Interactive Studios	Disney Interactive Studios	August 25, 2009 (NA)	No	Yes	Yes	Yes
Wizards of Waverly Place: Spellbound	Disney Interactive Studios	Disney Interactive Studios	November 16, 2010 (NA)	No	Yes	Yes	Yes
WiZmans World	Lancarse	Jaleco Entertainment	February 25, 2010 (JP)	Yes	No	No	No
Wonder Pets!: Save the Animals!	Black Lantern Studios	Take-Two Interactive	October 27, 2008 (NA)	No	Yes	Yes	No
Wonder World Amusement Park	Coyote Console	Majesco	July 8, 2008 (NA)	No	Yes	Yes	No
The Woodleys Summer Sports	Eidos Interactive	Eidos Interactive	August 15, 2008 (PAL)	No	No	Yes	No
Wordfish; Word Academy^{EU}	Ubisoft	Ubisoft	December 2, 2008 (NA)	No	Yes	Yes	No
WordJong	Destineer	Destineer	November 16, 2007 (NA)	No	Yes	Yes	No
Wordmaster	Sarbakan	Zoo Games	August 12, 2008 (NA)	No	Yes	Yes	No
World Championship Games: A Track & Field Event; International Athletics^{EU}	Ubisoft	Ubisoft	March 16, 2009 (NA)	No	Yes	Yes	Yes
World Championship Poker	Crave Entertainment	505 Games, Crave Entertainment	April 17, 2005 (NA)	No	Yes	Yes	No
World Championship Spelling; Mind, Body & Soul: Spellbound 2^{EU}	505 Games	505 Games	March 26, 2010 (PAL)	No	Yes	Yes	Yes
World Cup Of Pool	Midas Interactive Entertainment	Midas Interactive Entertainment	September 26, 2008 (PAL)	No	No	Yes	No
The World Ends With You	Jupiter	Square Enix	July 27, 2007 (JP)	Yes	Yes	Yes	Yes
The World of Golden Eggs: Nori Nori Uta Dekichatte Kei	AQ Interactive	AQ Interactive	February 19, 2009 (JP)	Yes	No	No	No
World of Zoo	1st Playable Productions	THQ	November 5, 2009 (AU)	No	Yes	Yes	Yes
World Series of Poker 2008: Battle for the Bracelets	Left Field Productions	Activision	November 6, 2007 (NA)	No	Yes	Yes	No
World Snooker Championship 2007-08	Blade Interactive	Blade Interactive	October 26, 2007 (PAL)	No	No	Yes	No
Worms: Open Warfare	Team17	THQ	March 22, 2006 (NA)	No	Yes	Yes	No
Worms: Open Warfare 2	Team17, Two Tribes B.V.	THQ	August 31, 2007 (PAL)	No	Yes	Yes	No
WWE SmackDown vs. Raw 2008	Amaze Entertainment	THQ	November 9, 2007 (PAL)	No	Yes	Yes	Yes
WWE SmackDown vs. Raw 2009	Tose	THQ	November 7, 2008 (PAL)	No	Yes	Yes	Yes
WWE SmackDown vs. Raw 2010	Tose	THQ	October 20, 2009 (NA)	No	Yes	Yes	Yes
X-Men Origins: Wolverine	Griptonite Games	Activision	May 1, 2009 (NA)	No	Yes	Yes	Yes
X-Men: Destiny	Other Ocean Interactive	Activision	September 27, 2011 (NA)	No	Yes	Yes	No
X-Men: The Official Game	Amaze Entertainment	Activision	May 16, 2006 (NA)	No	Yes	Yes	Yes
Xenosaga I & II	Monolith Soft	Namco	March 30, 2006 (JP)	Yes	No	No	No
XG Blast!	Rising Star Games	UFO Interactive Games	February 6, 2009 (PAL)	No	Yes	Yes	No
Xia-Xia	Black Lantern Studios	GameMill Publishing	March 13, 2012 (NA)	No	Yes	Yes	No
Xiaolin Showdown	Razorback Developments	Konami	November 28, 2006 (NA)	No	Yes	Yes	No
Yakitate!! Japan	Bandai	Bandai	January 12, 2006 (JP)	Yes	No	No	No
Yakuman DS	Intelligent Systems	Nintendo	March 31, 2005 (JP)	Yes	No	No	No
Yamaha Supercross	Coyote Console	Destination Software, Zoo Digital Publishing	July 14, 2008 (NA)	No	Yes	Yes	No
Yard Sale Hidden Treasures: Sunnyville	Konami	Konami	June 18, 2010 (NA)	No	Yes	No	No
Yatsu Hakamura	From Software	From Software	April 23, 2009 (JP)	Yes	No	No	No
Yatterman DS 2: Bikkuridokkiri Animal Daibouken	Takara Tomy	Takara Tomy	October 11, 2008 (JP)	Yes	No	No	No
Yatterman DS: Bikkuridokkiri Daisakusen da Koron	Takara Tomy	Takara Tomy	April 24, 2008 (JP)	Yes	No	No	No
Yes! PreCure 5	Bandai	Namco Bandai Games	November 29, 2007 (JP)	Yes	No	No	No
Yes! PreCure 5 GoGo! Zenin ShūGo! Dorīmu Fesutibaru	Bandai	Namco Bandai Games	October 30, 2008 (JP)	Yes	No	No	No
Yggdra Unison: Seiken Buyuuden	Sting Entertainment	Atlus	December 3, 2009 (JP)	Yes	No	No	No
Yogi Bear	1st Playable Productions	D3Publisher	December 7, 2010 (NA)	No	Yes	Yes	Yes
Yoshi Touch & Go	Nintendo	Nintendo	January 27, 2005 (JP)	Yes	Yes	Yes	Yes
Yoshi's Island DS	Artoon	Nintendo	November 13, 2006 (NA)	Yes	Yes	Yes	Yes
Yosumin DS	Square Enix	Square Enix	November 8, 2007 (JP)	Yes	No	No	No
You Don't Know Jack	Jellyvision Games, Webfoot Technologies	THQ	February 8, 2011 (NA)	No	Yes	No	No
Youda Farmer	Foreign Media	Foreign Media	November 12, 2010 (EU)	No	No	Yes	No
Youda Legend: The Curse of the Amsterdam Diamond	Joindots	Purple Hills	August 29, 2011 (EU)	No	No	Yes	No
Youda Legend: The Golden Bird of Paradise	Joindots	Purple Hills	May 11, 2012 (EU)	No	No	Yes	No
Youda Safari	Foreign Media	Foreign Media	May 5, 2011 (EU)	No	No	Yes	No
Ys Book I DS	Interchannel-Holon	Interchannel-Holon	March 20, 2008 (JP)	Yes	No	No	No
Ys Book II DS	Interchannel-Holon	Interchannel-Holon	March 20, 2008 (JP)	Yes	No	No	No
Ys Strategy	Future Creates	JP: Marvelous Entertainment; PAL: Rising Star Games	March 23, 2006 (JP)	Yes	No	Yes	Yes
Yu-Gi-Oh! 5D's Stardust Accelerator: World Championship 2009	Konami	Konami	May 19, 2009 (NA)	Yes	Yes	Yes	Yes
Yu-Gi-Oh! 5D's World Championship 2010: Reverse of Arcadia	Konami	Konami	February 18, 2010 (JP)	Yes	Yes	Yes	No
Yu-Gi-Oh! 5D's World Championship 2011: Over the Nexus	Konami	Konami	February 24, 2011 (JP)	Yes	Yes	Yes	No
Yu-Gi-Oh! Duel Monsters GX: Spirit Summoner	Konami	Konami	November 30, 2006 (JP)	Yes	Yes	Yes	Yes
Yu-Gi-Oh! Duel Monsters: Nightmare Troubadour	Konami	Konami	July 21, 2005 (JP)	Yes	Yes	Yes	Yes
Yu-Gi-Oh! Duel Monsters: World Championship 2007	Konami	Atari, Konami	March 15, 2007 (JP)	Yes	Yes	Yes	Yes
Yu-Gi-Oh! Duel Monsters: World Championship 2008	Konami	Konami	November 29, 2007 (JP)	Yes	Yes	Yes	Yes
Yukkuri Tanoshimi Taijin no Jigsaw Puzzle DS: Watase Seizou - Love Umi to Blue	Interchannel	Interchannel	June 25, 2009 (JP)	Yes	No	No	No
Yukkuri Tanoshimu Otona no Jigsaw Puzzle DS: Sekai no Meiga 1: Renaissance, Baroque no Kyoshou	Interchannel	Interchannel	May 17, 2007 (JP)	Yes	No	No	No
Yukkuri Tanoshimu Otona no Jigsaw Puzzle DS: Sekai no Meiga 2: Inshou-ha, Kouki Inshou-ha no Kyoshou	Interchannel	Interchannel	May 17, 2007 (JP)	Yes	No	No	No
Yume Neko DS	Sega	Sega	April 24, 2008 (JP)	Yes	No	No	No
Yume o Kanaeru Zou	Tryfirst	Tryfirst	May 21, 2009 (JP)	Yes	No	No	No
Yumeiro Patissiere: My Sweets Cooking	Konami	Konami	May 27, 2010 (JP)	Yes	No	No	No
Yuu Yuu Hakusho DS: Ankoku Bujutsukai Hen	Takara Tomy	Takara Tomy	September 21, 2006 (JP)	Yes	No	No	No
Yuuzai x Muzai	Bandai Namco Games	Bandai Namco Games	May 21, 2009 (JP)	Yes	No	No	No
Zac to Ombra: Maboroshi no Yuuenchi	Konami	Konami	October 28, 2010 (JP)	Yes	No	No	No
Zarah: Das Schloss des Gwoor	Kritzelkratz 3000	Tivola	June 15, 2009 (EU)	No	No	Yes	No
Zekkyou Senshi: Sakeburein	Suzak	Nintendo	September 11, 2007 (JP)	Yes	No	No	No
Zendoku	Zoonami	Eidos Interactive	April 20, 2007 (EU)	No	Yes	Yes	Yes
Zenmai Zamurai	Genki	Genki	July 19, 2007 (JP)	Yes	No	No	No
Zenses Ocean	Shin'en Multimedia	The Game Factory	October 31, 2008 (PAL)	No	Yes	Yes	No
Zenses Rainforest	Shin'en Multimedia	The Game Factory	October 31, 2008 (PAL)	No	Yes	Yes	No
Zenses Zen Garden	Shin'en Multimedia	Knowledge Adventure Inc.	September 1, 2010 (JP)	Yes	No	No	No
The Zero-Yon * Shin'ya	Tamsoft	D3 Publisher	September 20, 2007 (JP)	Yes	No	No	No
Zettai Karen Children DS: Dai-4 no Children	Konami	Konami	September 4, 2008 (JP)	Yes	No	No	No
Zettai Onkan Otoda Master	Hudson Soft	Hudson Soft	August 2, 2007 (JP)	Yes	No	No	No
Zettai Zetsumei Dangerous Jiisan DS: Dangerous Sensation	Kids Station	Kids Station	January 14, 2006 (JP)	Yes	No	No	No
Zhu Zhu Babies	Activision	Activision	November 1, 2011 (NA)	No	Yes	Yes	No
Zhu Zhu Pets	Activision	Activision	March 21, 2010 (NA)	No	Yes	Yes	No
Zhu Zhu Pets 2	Activision	Activision	October 12, 2010 (NA)	No	Yes	Yes	Yes
Zhu Zhu Pets: Kung Zhu	Activision	Activision	October 12, 2010 (NA)	No	Yes	Yes	No
Zhu Zhu Pets: Quest for Zhu	Activision	Activision	September 27, 2011 (NA)	No	Yes	No	No
Zhu Zhu Puppies	Activision	Activision	March 29, 2011 (NA)	No	Yes	Yes	No
Zoey 101: Field Trip Fiasco	Barking Lizards Technologies	THQ	September 11, 2007 (NA)	No	Yes	No	No
Zoids Battle Colosseum	Takara Tomy	Takara Tomy	November 30, 2006 (JP)	Yes	No	No	No
Zoids Dash	Takara Tomy	Takara Tomy	June 15, 2006 (JP)	Yes	No	No	No
Zoids Saga DS: Legend of Arcadia	Tomy	Tomy	November 11, 2005 (JP)	Yes	No	No	No
Zombi Daisuki	ChunSoft	ChunSoft	January 20, 2011 (JP)	Yes	No	No	No
The Zombie Crisis	D3 Publisher	D3 Publisher	January 31, 2008 (JP)	Yes	No	No	No
Zombie Shiki - Eigo Ryoku Sosei Jutsu: English of the Dead	Now Production	Sega	May 29, 2008 (JP)	Yes	No	No	No
Zombies Seeker	7Raven Studios	Zoo Games	February 8, 2011 (NA)	No	Yes	No	No
Zoo Hospital	Torus Games	Eidos Interactive, Majesco	October 23, 2007 (NA)	No	Yes	Yes	No
Zoo Keeper	Success	Ignition Entertainment, Success	December 2, 2004 (JP)	Yes	Yes	Yes	No
Zoo Quest: Puzzle Fun!	DreamCatcher Interactive	DreamCatcher Interactive	December 22, 2008 (NA)	No	Yes	Yes	Yes
Zoo Tycoon 2 DS	Altron	THQ	February 4, 2008 (NA)	Yes	Yes	Yes	Yes
Zoo Tycoon DS	Altron	Sega, THQ	October 11, 2005 (NA)	Yes	Yes	Yes	Yes
Zoo Vet: Endangered Animals	Legacy Games	Vivendi Games	October 20, 2008 (NA)	No	Yes	No	No
Zoobles! Spring to Life!	Now Production	Activision	November 1, 2011 (NA)	No	Yes	Yes	No
Zorro: Quest for Justice	Beast Studios	505 Games	September 4, 2009 (PAL)	Yes	Yes	Yes	No
Zubo	EA Bright Light	Electronic Arts	October 3, 2008 (PAL)	Yes	Yes	Yes	No
Zuma's Revenge!	PopCap Games	PopCap Games	February 21, 2012 (NA)	No	Yes	No	No

== Applications ==
There are 480 applications included in the list.

Title	Developer(s)	Publisher(s)	First released	JP	NA	EU	AU
Quick Yoga Training	Ubisoft	Ubisoft	August 6, 2008 (NA)	No	Yes	Yes	No
Rakuraku Shindenzu Training DS	Jupiter Corporation	Medika Shuppan	December 17, 2008 (JP)	Yes	No	No	No
Recettes de cuisine avec Cyril lignac	MindScape	MindScape	2009 (EU)	No	No	Yes	No
Rekiken DS	Rocket Company	Rocket Company	April 24, 2008 (JP)	Yes	No	No	No
Saeki Chizu Shiki Yumemihada: Dream Skincare	Konami	Konami	October 18, 2007 (JP)	Yes	No	No	No
Saitou Takashi no DS de Yomu Sanshoku Ball-Pen Meisaku Juku	Sega	Sega	July 19, 2007 (JP)	Yes	No	No	No
Sakai Burai Kaiji: Death or Survival	Compile Heart	Compile Heart	September 25, 2008 (JP)	Yes	No	No	No
Sakashou DS	Electronic Arts	Electronic Arts	August 23, 2007 (JP)	Yes	No	No	No
Saku-Saku Jinko Kokyu Care Training DS	Medica Shuppan	Medica Shuppan	February 1, 2010 (JP)	Yes	No	No	No
SBI Group Kanshuu: Hajime You! Shisan Unyou DS	Game Republic	Broad Media	April 17, 2008 (JP)	Yes	No	No	No
Sekaishi DS	IE Institute	IE Institute	November 12, 2009 (JP)	Yes	No	No	No
Shaberu! DS Oryōri Navi	Nintendo	Nintendo	July 20, 2006 (JP)	Yes	No	No	No
Shaberu! DS Oryōri Navi: Marugoto Teikoku Hotel	Nintendo	Nintendo	June 21, 2007 (JP)	Yes	No	No	No
Shibou Nenshou Keikaku: YaseTore!! DS	Microvision	D3Publisher	March 19, 2008 (JP)	Yes	No	No	No
Shikaku Kentei DS	Land Ho!	Sega	July 26, 2007 (JP)	Yes	No	No	No
Shikakui Atama o Maru Kusuru: DS Joushiki, Nanmon no Shou	IE Institute	IE Institute	September 28, 2006 (JP)	Yes	No	No	No
Shikakui Atama o Maru Kusuru: DS Keisan no Shou	IE Institute	IE Institute	September 28, 2006 (JP)	Yes	No	No	No
Shikakui Atama wo Maruku Suru: DS Kanji no Shou	IE Institute	IE Institute	September 28, 2006 (JP)	Yes	No	No	No
Shin Maru Goukaku: Shikaku Busshu! IT Passport Shiken	Media5	Media5	February 3, 2011 (JP)	Yes	No	No	No
Shinri Kenkyuuka Yuuki Yuu Kanshuu: Mainichi Kokorobics DS Therapy	HuneX	Dimple Entertainment	May 24, 2007 (JP)	Yes	No	No	No
Shiseido Beauty Solution Kaihatsu Center Kanshuu: Project Beauty	Sega	Sega	November 27, 2008 (JP)	Yes	No	No	No
Shoho Kara Hajimeru Otona no Eitango Renshuu	Now Production	Now Production	May 22, 2008 (JP)	Yes	No	No	No
Shokera Renai Otona no Tame no Metabo Dassutsu Training	HuneX	Dimple Entertainment	May 24, 2007 (JP)	Yes	No	No	No
Shoko Shindan Training Dekiru! Pura DS	Medica Shuppan	Medica Shuppan	December 1, 2010 (JP)	Yes	No	No	No
Shuwa no Mori	Starfish SD	Starfish SD	June 18, 2009 (JP)	Yes	No	No	No
Simple DS Series Vol. 19: Yareba Dekiru! THE Micro Step Gijutsu de Oboeru Eitango	Vingt-et-un Systems	D3 Publisher	July 26, 2007 (JP)	Yes	No	No	No
Simple DS Series Vol. 36: Arc de Minitsuku! TOEIC Test Bunpou Tokkun Hen	Vingt-et-un Systems	D3 Publisher	May 22, 2008 (JP)	Yes	No	No	No
Simple DS Series Vol. 37: Arc de Minitsuku! TOEIC Test Listening Kyouka Hen	Vingt-et-un Systems	D3 Publisher	May 22, 2008 (JP)	Yes	No	No	No
Simple DS Series Vol. 38: Arc de Manabu! TOEIC Test Hajimete Hen	Vingt-et-un Systems	D3 Publisher	May 22, 2008 (JP)	Yes	No	No	No
Sommelier DS	Electronic Arts	Electronic Arts	July 19, 2007 (JP)	Yes	No	No	No
Sonshi no Heihou DS	Media-5	Media-5	May 21, 2009 (JP)	Yes	No	No	No
Spiegel Online: Allgemeinwissen	The Games Company	The Games Company	October 27, 2009 (PAL)	No	No	Yes	No
Spiegel Online: Karriere Coach	The Games Company	The Games Company	November 5, 2009 (PAL)	No	No	Yes	No
Spiegel Online: Life Coach	The Games Company	The Games Company	November 5, 2009 (PAL)	No	No	Yes	No
Spiegel Online: Weltreise	The Games Company	The Games Company	November 5, 2009 (PAL)	No	No	Yes	No
Spielend Mathe Lernen	Deep Silver	Deep Silver	February 9, 2010 (PAL)	No	No	Yes	No
Steve Soresi no Business Eikaiwa PeraPera DS Training	IE Institute	IE Institute	March 11, 2010 (JP)	Yes	No	No	No
Steve Soresi no Eikaiwa PeraPera DS Training	IE Institute	IE Institute	March 11, 2010 (JP)	Yes	No	No	No
Style Book: Cinnamoroll	Bandai	Bandai	March 23, 2006 (JP)	Yes	No	No	No
Style Book: Fushigi Boshi no Futago Hime Gyu!	Bandai	Bandai	March 23, 2006 (JP)	Yes	No	No	No
Style Book: Junior City	Bandai	Bandai	March 23, 2006 (JP)	Yes	No	No	No
Successfully Learning: English; Lernerfolg Grundschule: Englisch - Klasse 1-4^{DE} Lernerfolg Grundschule: English, Klasse 1+2^{DE} Lernerfolg Grundschule: English, Klasse 3+4^{DE} J'apprends l'Anglais CP-CM1^{FR}	Dreamcatcher	Dreamcatcher	December 22, 2008 (PAL)	No	No	Yes	No
Suisui Physical Assessment Training DS	Medica Shuppan	Medica Shuppan	May 1, 2011 (JP)	Yes	No	No	No
Sunrise Anime Duke - Sunrise no Joushiki: Minna no Hijoushiki Vol.1	Sunrise Interactive	Sunrise Interactive	December 20, 2007 (JP)	Yes	No	No	No
Suugaku Master DS	IE Institute	IE Institute	October 15, 2009 (JP)	Yes	No	No	No
Tabi no Yubisashi Kaiwachō DS: DS Series 1 Thai	Tose	Nintendo	April 20, 2006 (JP)	Yes	No	No	No
Tabi no Yubisashi Kaiwachō DS: DS Series 2 Chūgoku	Tose	Nintendo	April 20, 2006 (JP)	Yes	No	No	No
Tabi no Yubisashi Kaiwachō DS: DS Series 3 Kankoku	Tose	Nintendo	April 20, 2006 (JP)	Yes	No	No	No
Tabi no Yubisashi Kaiwachō DS: DS Series 4 America	Tose	Nintendo	April 27, 2006 (JP)	Yes	No	No	No
Tabi no Yubisashi Kaiwachō DS: DS Series 5 Deutsch	Tose	Nintendo	April 27, 2006 (JP)	Yes	No	No	No
Tadashii Nihongo DS	Mycom	Mycom	January 25, 2007 (JP)	Yes	No	No	No
Takahashi Shoten Kanshuu: Saihinshutsu! SPI Perfect Mondaishuu	Genki	Genki	January 24, 2008 (JP)	Yes	No	No	No
Takahashi Shoten Kanshuu: Saihinshutsu! SPI Perfect Mondaishuu DS 2010 Nendohan	Genki	Genki	December 18, 2008 (JP)	Yes	No	No	No
Takahashi Shoten Kanshuu: Saihinshutsu! SPI Perfect Mondaishuu DS 2011 Nendohan	Genki	Genki	January 14, 2010 (JP)	Yes	No	No	No
Takahashi Shoten Kanshuu: Saihinshutsu! SPI Perfect Mondaishuu DS 2012 Nendohan	Genki	Genki	November 25, 2010 (JP)	Yes	No	No	No
Take-Out! DS Series 1: Tetsudou Data File	AIUEO-KAN	D3Publisher	January 22, 2009 (JP)	Yes	No	No	No
Take-Out! DS Series 2: Yachou Daizukan	AIUEO-KAN	D3Publisher	February 26, 2009 (JP)	Yes	No	No	No
Teki-Paki Kyukyu / Kyuhen Training DS	Medica Shuppan	Medica Shuppan	December 1, 2009 (JP)	Yes	No	No	No
Teku Teku Angel Pocket with DS Teku Teku Nikki	Hudson	Hudson	December 21, 2006 (JP)	Yes	No	No	No
Tenohira Gakushuu: Chikyuu no Narabe Kata	Beyond Interactive	Success	December 7, 2006 (JP)	Yes	No	No	No
Tetsudou Kentei DS	Spike	Spike	October 9, 2008 (JP)	Yes	No	No	No
Tetsudou Seminar: JR-Hen	Taito Corporation	Taito Corporation	March 27, 2008 (JP)	Yes	No	No	No
TOEIC DS: Haru 10-Bun Yakjeomgeukbog +200	Skonec	Skonec	2008 (KO)	Yes	No	No	No
Toeic Test DS Training	IE Institute	IE Institute	March 29, 2007 (JP)	Yes	No	No	No
TOEIC Test Eitango: Speed Master	Creative Core	Creative Core	April 30, 2009 (JP)	Yes	No	No	No
TOEIC Test Kousiki DS Training	IE Institute	IE Institute	August 27, 2009 (JP)	Yes	No	No	No
TOEIC Test Super Coach @DS	Kirihara Shoten	Kirihara Shoten	February 25, 2010 (JP)	Yes	No	No	No
Toetstrainer: Rekenen	Foreign Media	Foreign Media	October 22, 2010 (PAL)	No	No	Yes	No
Toetstrainer: Taal	Foreign Media	Foreign Media	October 22, 2010 (PAL)	No	No	Yes	No
Tokutei! Metabo Juku	OeRSTED	Ludic	May 29, 2008 (JP)	Yes	No	No	No
Tokutenryoku Gakushuu DS: Chuu-1 Eigo	Benesse	Benesse	February 5, 2008 (JP)	Yes	No	No	No
Tokutenryoku Gakushuu DS: Chuu-1 Eigo Taikenban	Benesse	Benesse	February 5, 2008 (JP)	Yes	No	No	No
Tokutenryoku Gakushuu DS: Chuu-1 Eisuukoku Pack	Benesse	Benesse	February 5, 2008 (JP)	Yes	No	No	No
Tokutenryoku Gakushuu DS: Chuu-1 Kokugo	Benesse	Benesse	February 5, 2008 (JP)	Yes	No	No	No
Tokutenryoku Gakushuu DS: Chuu-1 Rika	Benesse	Benesse	February 5, 2008 (JP)	Yes	No	No	No
Tokutenryoku Gakushuu DS: Chuu-1 Suugaku	Benesse	Benesse	February 5, 2008 (JP)	Yes	No	No	No
Tokutenryoku Gakushuu DS: Chuu-2 Eigo	Benesse	Benesse	February 5, 2008 (JP)	Yes	No	No	No
Tokutenryoku Gakushuu DS: Chuu-2 Eisuukoku Pack	Benesse	Benesse	February 5, 2008 (JP)	Yes	No	No	No
Tokutenryoku Gakushuu DS: Chuu-2 Kokugo	Benesse	Benesse	February 5, 2008 (JP)	Yes	No	No	No
Tokutenryoku Gakushuu DS: Chuu-2 Rika	Benesse	Benesse	February 5, 2008 (JP)	Yes	No	No	No
Tokutenryoku Gakushuu DS: Chuu-2 Suugaku	Benesse	Benesse	February 5, 2008 (JP)	Yes	No	No	No
Tokutenryoku Gakushuu DS: Chuu-3 Eigo	Benesse	Benesse	February 5, 2008 (JP)	Yes	No	No	No
Tokutenryoku Gakushuu DS: Chuu-3 Eisuukoku Koumin Pack	Benesse	Benesse	February 5, 2008 (JP)	Yes	No	No	No
Tokutenryoku Gakushuu DS: Chuu-3 Kokugo	Benesse	Benesse	February 5, 2008 (JP)	Yes	No	No	No
Tokutenryoku Gakushuu DS: Chuu-3 Rika	Benesse	Benesse	February 5, 2008 (JP)	Yes	No	No	No
Tokutenryoku Gakushuu DS: Chuu-3 Suugaku	Benesse	Benesse	February 5, 2008 (JP)	Yes	No	No	No
Tokutenryoku Gakushuu DS: Chuugaku Chireki Rika Pack	Benesse	Benesse	February 5, 2008 (JP)	Yes	No	No	No
Tokutenryoku Gakushuu DS: Chuugaku Chiri	Benesse	Benesse	February 5, 2008 (JP)	Yes	No	No	No
Tokutenryoku Gakushuu DS: Chuugaku Jitsugi 4 Kyouka	Benesse	Benesse	February 5, 2008 (JP)	Yes	No	No	No
Tokutenryoku Gakushuu DS: Chuugaku Jitsugi 4 Kyouka Youten Matome Chuugaku Eigo	Benesse	Benesse	February 5, 2008 (JP)	Yes	No	No	No
Tokutenryoku Gakushuu DS: Chuugaku Juken 5 Kyouka	Benesse	Benesse	February 5, 2008 (JP)	Yes	No	No	No
Tokutenryoku Gakushuu DS: Chuugaku Juken Kokugo	Benesse	Benesse	February 5, 2008 (JP)	Yes	No	No	No
Tokutenryoku Gakushuu DS: Chuugaku Juken Rika	Benesse	Benesse	February 5, 2008 (JP)	Yes	No	No	No
Tokutenryoku Gakushuu DS: Chuugaku Juken Shakai	Benesse	Benesse	February 5, 2008 (JP)	Yes	No	No	No
Tokutenryoku Gakushuu DS: Chuugaku Juken Suugaku	Benesse	Benesse	February 5, 2008 (JP)	Yes	No	No	No
Tokutenryoku Gakushuu DS: Chuugaku Koumi	Benesse	Benesse	February 5, 2008 (JP)	Yes	No	No	No
Tokutenryoku Gakushuu DS: Chuugaku Rekishi	Benesse	Benesse	February 5, 2008 (JP)	Yes	No	No	No
Tokutenryoku Gakushuu DS: Chuugaku Rika 1 Bunya	Benesse	Benesse	February 5, 2008 (JP)	Yes	No	No	No
Tokutenryoku Gakushuu DS: Chuugaku Rika 2 Bunya	Benesse	Benesse	February 5, 2008 (JP)	Yes	No	No	No
Tokutenryoku Gakushuu DS: Shougakkou Youten Matome	Benesse	Benesse	February 5, 2008 (JP)	Yes	No	No	No
Tokyo Shoukou Kaigisho Kanshuu: Kankyou Jidai no Koushiki Kentei - Eco Kentei DS	Alpha Unit	Alpha Unit	October 30, 2008 (JP)	Yes	No	No	No
Tomodachi Tsukurou! Mahou no Koukan Nikki; Magical Diary: Secrets Sharing	Ertain	Ertain	December 6, 2007 (JP)	Yes	No	No	No
Toshokan DS: Meisaku & Suiri & Kaidan & Bungaku	Dorart	Dorart	August 2, 2007 (JP)	Yes	No	No	No
Tossa no Keisanryoku Shunkan Sokutou: Keisan DS Training	IE Institute	IE Institute	March 21, 2007 (JP)	Yes	No	No	No
Touch de Ni-Hao Hitsudan	Digital Media Lab	Digital Media Lab	July 10, 2008 (JP)	Yes	No	No	No
Touch Dictionary	Daiwon C&A	Daiwon C&A	July 1, 2005 (KO)	No	No	No	No
Tout Pour Reussir - CE1	BiP Media	Micro Application	June 3, 2009 (PAL)	No	No	Yes	No
Tout Pour Reussir - CE2	BiP Media	Micro Application	June 3, 2009 (PAL)	No	No	Yes	No
Tout Pour Reussir - CM1	BiP Media	Micro Application	June 3, 2009 (PAL)	No	No	Yes	No
Tout Pour Reussir - CM2	BiP Media	Micro Application	June 3, 2009 (PAL)	No	No	Yes	No
Tout Pour Reussir - CP	BiP Media	Micro Application	June 3, 2009 (PAL)	No	No	Yes	No
Tout Savoir: 3e	Atari	Infogrames	July 2, 2008 (PAL)	No	No	Yes	No
Tout Savoir: 4e	Atari	Infogrames	July 2, 2008 (PAL)	No	No	Yes	No
Tout Savoir: 5e	Atari	Infogrames	July 2, 2008 (PAL)	No	No	Yes	No
Tout Savoir: 6e	Atari	Infogrames	July 2, 2008 (PAL)	No	No	Yes	No
Tout Savoir: CE1	Atari	Infogrames	July 2, 2008 (PAL)	No	No	Yes	No
Tout Savoir: CE2	Atari	Infogrames	July 2, 2008 (PAL)	No	No	Yes	No
Tout Savoir: CM1	Atari	Infogrames	July 2, 2008 (PAL)	No	No	Yes	No
Tout Savoir: CM2	Atari	Infogrames	July 2, 2008 (PAL)	No	No	Yes	No
Tout Savoir: CP	Atari	Infogrames	July 2, 2008 (PAL)	No	No	Yes	No
Tout Savoir: Maternelle Grande Section	Atari	Infogrames	July 2, 2008 (PAL)	No	No	Yes	No
Tsuji Gakuen Tsuji Cooking Kanshuu - Koharu no DS Uchigohan. - Shokuji Balance Guide Tsuki	Comolink	Comolink	October 4, 2007 (JP)	Yes	No	No	No
U-Can Penji Training DS	Sega	Sega	September 25, 2008 (JP)	Yes	No	No	No
Uranai Demo Shite Miyouka DS	Hudson Soft	Hudson Soft	June 28, 2007 (JP)	Yes	No	No	No
Utsukushii Nihongo no Kakikata Hanashikata DS	IE Institute	IE Institute	May 17, 2007 (JP)	Yes	No	No	No
Vokabel Buddy Englisch	Snapdragon Games	Deep Silver	October 1, 2009 (PAL)	No	No	Yes	No
Vokabel Buddy Franzosisch	Snapdragon Games	Deep Silver	October 1, 2009 (PAL)	No	No	Yes	No
Wakabayashi Fumie no DS Kabu Lesson	Namco Bandai Games	Namco Bandai Games	June 21, 2007 (JP)	Yes	No	No	No
Watashi no Happy Manner Book	Taito Corporation	Taito Corporation	April 5, 2007 (JP)	Yes	No	No	No
Wine no Hajimekata DS	Matrix Software	Square Enix	November 15, 2007 (JP)	Yes	No	No	No
Yamakawa Shuppansha Kanshuu: Shousetsu Nihonshi B: Shin Sougou Training Plus	Namco Bandai Games	Namco Bandai Games	February 4, 2010 (JP)	Yes	No	No	No
Yamakawa Shuppansha Kanshuu: Shousetsu Nihonshi DS	Namco Bandai Games	Namco Bandai Games	June 7, 2007 (JP)	Yes	No	No	No
Yamakawa Shuppansha Kanshuu: Shousetsu Sakaishi B: Shin Sougou Training Plus	Namco Bandai Games	Namco Bandai Games	February 4, 2010 (JP)	Yes	No	No	No
Yamakawa Shuppansha Kanshuu: Shousetsu Sekaishi DS	Namco Bandai Games	Namco Bandai Games	June 7, 2007 (JP)	Yes	No	No	No
Yokojiku de Manabu Sekai no Rekishi: Yoko-Gaku DS	Bullets	Takara Tomy	July 10, 2008 (JP)	Yes	No	No	No
Yomesou de Yomenai Kanji DS	TDK Core	TDK Core	November 22, 2007 (JP)	Yes	No	No	No
Yozemi no Center Shoujun Series: Eigo Hen	ASK	ASK	December 6, 2007 (JP)	Yes	No	No	No
Yu-Gi-Oh! GX Card Almanac	Konami	Konami	August 9, 2007 (JP)	Yes	No	Yes	Yes
Zaidan Houjin Nippon Kanji Nouryoku Kentai Kyoukai Kyouryoku: Kanken DS Training	IE Institute	IE Institute	October 14, 2010 (JP)	Yes	No	No	No
Zaidan Houjin Nippon Kanji Nouryoku Kentei Kounin: KanKen DS	Rocket Company	Rocket Company	September 28, 2006 (JP)	Yes	No	No	No
Zaidan Houjin Nippon Kanji Nouryoku Kentei Kyoukai Kounin: KanKen DS 2 + Jouyou Kanji Jiten	Imagineer	Rocket Company	September 27, 2007 (JP)	Yes	No	No	No
Zaidan Houjin Nippon Kanji Nouryoku Kentei Kyoukai Kounin: Kanken DS 3 Deluxe	Imagineer	Rocket Company	April 9, 2009 (JP)	Yes	No	No	No
Zaidan Houjin Nippon Kanji Nouryoku Kentei Kyoukai Koushiki Soft: 250-Mannin no KanKen	IE Institute	IE Institute	November 1, 2007 (JP)	Yes	No	No	No
Zero Kara Hajimeru: Otona no 5-Kokugo Nyuumon	Now Production	Now Production	November 13, 2008 (JP)	Yes	No	No	No
Zero Kara Kantan Chuugokugo DS	IE Institute	IE Institute	April 8, 2010 (JP)	Yes	No	No	No
Zero Kara Kantan Kankokugo DS	IE Institute	IE Institute	April 8, 2010 (JP)	Yes	No	No	No

== Bundles ==
There are 42 games included in the list.

Title	Developer(s)	Publisher(s)	First released	JP	NA	EU	AU
The Quest Trio	Activision	Activision	August 26, 2008 (NA)	No	Yes	No	No
Scribblenauts Collection	5TH Cell	Warner Bros. Interactive Entertainment	March 5, 2013 (NA)	No	Yes	No	No
Sega Fun Pack: Sonic Rush / Super Monkey Ball Touch & Roll	Sega	Sega	2009 (NA)	No	Yes	No	No
The Smurfs Collection	Ubisoft	Ubisoft	May 16, 2014 (EU)	No	No	Yes	No
Tokimeki Memorial Girl's Side Double Pack	Konami	Konami	October 25, 2012 (JP)	Yes	No	No	No
Tokimeki Memorial Girl's Side Triple Pack	Konami	Konami	September 26, 2013 (JP)	Yes	No	No	No
Tokutenryoku Gakushuu DS Chuu 1-5 Kyouka Pack	Benesse	Benesse	2013 (JP)	Yes	No	No	No
Tokutenryoku Gakushuu DS Chuu 3-5 Kyouka Pack	Benesse	Benesse	2013 (JP)	Yes	No	No	No
Tokutenryoku Gakushuu DS Chuu-1 Rika Chuu-2 Rika Chuu-3 Rika	Benesse	Benesse	2013 (JP)	Yes	No	No	No
Tokutenryoku Gakushuu DS Kouou Juken 5 Kyouka Pack	Benesse	Benesse	2013 (JP)	Yes	No	No	No
Transformers: Ultimate Autobots Edition	Activision	Activision	November 12, 2013 (NA)	No	Yes	Yes	No

== See also ==
- List of DSiWare games and applications
- List of Game Boy games
- List of Game Boy Advance games
- List of Game Boy Color games
- List of Nintendo DS Wi-Fi Connection games
- List of Wii games
- Lists of video games
