= Shonen Kininden Tsumuji =

2010 video game

Shōnen Kininden Tsumuji
- Developer: Neuron Age
- Publisher: Electronic Arts
- Platform: Nintendo DS
- Release: JP: February 25, 2010
- Genre: Action-adventure
- Modes: Single-player, Multiplayer (battle mode only)

Shōnen Kininden Tsumuji (Japanese: 少年鬼忍伝ツムジ, Hepburn: Shounen Kininden Tsumuji; lit. Boy's Demon Ninja Chronicle Tsumuji) is a 2010 action-adventure video game developed by Neuron Age and published by Electronic Arts in Japan.

== Gameplay and story ==
Shōnen Kininden Tsumuji is an action-adventure game in which players take the role of a ninja in training named Tsumuji, who lives in the mountains with his family. When they have been attacked; Tsumuji tries to find out why. Players move Tsumuji by using the Nintendo DS system's stylus. The game also involves stylus-based combat, in which players draw a path for Tsumuji's shuriken. Players are also able to avoid combat. Some sequences require players to sneak under floorboards, to try to gather information while trying to avoid revealing their presence.

== Development ==
The sneaking mechanic comes from Japanese history; according to the game's producer, it is inspired by how ninjas used to sneak underneath houses and eavesdrop on people to gather information.

The game was released in Japan on February 25, 2010, by Electronic Arts.

== Reception ==
Japanese video game magazine Famitsu gave the game a score of 27/40 in a cross review by four reviewers. They appreciated the touch controls and user-friendliness, calling it an excellent action game. They also appreciated the design of the character Tsumuji, who they called cute.

The game has been compared to the video game series The Legend of Zelda.
