= Rhythm de Run Run Run =

2009 video game

Rhythm de Run Run Run リズムdeラン♪ラン♪ラン♪
- Japanese game cover
- Developer(s): Alpha Unit
- Publisher(s): Alpha Unit
- Platform(s): Nintendo DS
- Release: JP: April 9, 2009
- Genre(s): Rhythm, platform
- Mode(s): Single-player

Rhythm de Run Run Run (リズムdeラン♪ラン♪ラン♪ Rizumu de Ran Ran Ran) is a 2D sprite-based comedic Rhythm/Runner game developed by Japanese studio AlphaUnit, the game can be played using the microphone, touch screen or buttons and requires the player to dodge incoming obstacles throughout various randomly themed levels that range from fantasy rpg to real life situations and micro biology, always keeping a funny comedic tone.

== Description ==
A Rhythm Runner game on the same vein as games like Bit.Trip.Runner and HarmoKnight, the player runs through a stage from point A to B taking as little damage as possible. if the energy bar reaches 0% the player loses and has to try the level. with beautiful 2D graphics, there are multiple ways to play the game, the character movement can be sound activated, activated by touch or by button pressing ( has to be turned on in the options screen )

Every stage in the game has a different scenario and characters and a different setting. The first level being a kid running through a street to get to a bathroom, dodging bypassers and obstacles, the second level being a fat guy trying to get through a matsuri without eating to lose weight... another level you're a bride trying to avoid kids from ruining it by throwing things at you, another level is a Dragon Quest style famicom rpg where you run through the fields, then cross a village to protect it and go for the castle of the demon king to battle him in one of the later levels you're a weather reporter trying to get through the city to report during a storm and on another level you're a white globule (represented by a muscular guy in a white fullbody spandex) protecting someone's body from inside... and so on, the game offers a huge variety of scenarios. the randomness and style of the jokes makes this games somewhat similar to the warioware series.

the game rewards the player according to their ability, for example, if the player can get through the level with over 90% energy left, the character will become really fit in the last segment of the level.
