= OpenSesame Inc =

Educational technology company

OpenSesame
- Company type: Online education
- Available in: English, French, German, Arabic, Italian, Portuguese, Dutch, Russian, Spanish, Chinese
- Founded: 2011
- Headquarters: Decentralized, Global
- Key people: Don Spear, Joshua Blank, Aaron Bridges
- Industry: eLearning
- Employees: 250
- Website: www.opensesame.com
- Registration: Required
- Current status: Active

OpenSesame Inc. is a global educational technology company that provides an online marketplace for buying and selling online courses focused primarily on employee training. The company was founded in 2011 and operates as a decentralized organization to a global market.

== History ==
The company was founded in 2011 by Don Spear, Joshua Blank, Aaron Bridges and Tom Turnbull. The website functions as an ecommerce platform where users buy and sell courses for employee training and personal education. As of 2014, the company had raised $10 million in funding from investors.

As of January 2025, OpenSesame hosted over 40,000 courses from over 100 publishers spanning 30+ languages.

== Software ==
OpenSesame operates a "course marketplace" that aggregates training material from hundreds of publishers across nine categories. Training categories include safety, compliance, business skills, technology, and leadership among others. These courses are made available to subscribers who can use OpenSesame software to build training programs and export them to third-party LMS products for consumption.

The company also offers a course creation tool with translation features in 70+ languages and a talent growth platform focused on personalized training programs and assessments.

== Patent Law ==
Since 2010 the company has held a patent on a remote learning system called “Open and Interactive E-Learning System and Method". This patent was challenged in 2022 by Australian elearning company "Go1" to cancel all patent claims. After a year of proceedings the Patent Trial and Appeal Board (PTAB) issued a final decision on February 26, 2024 in favor of OpenSesame.

== Awards ==
In 2025, "Icon", a brand exclusively available on OpenSesame, was awarded a bronze Telly Award in general thought leadership for the content contained in the course "The Truth About Bias in AI".
