= Remindelight =

2006 video game

- Cover art, featuring (left to right) Kuurie, Surf, Enju, and Tolon
- Developer: Japan Art Media
- Publisher: Taito
- Platform: Nintendo DS
- Release: JP: September 28, 2006
- Genre: Action role-playing
- Mode: Single-player

Remindelight (Note: Remindelight (Japanese: リマインデライト, Hepburn: Rimainderaito)) is an action role-playing video game developed by Japan Art Media and published by Taito for the Nintendo DS on September 28, 2006, in Japan. The player controls four characters with different abilities, navigating an overworld and fighting enemies using the D-pad, touchscreen, and a microphone. The story sees the four player characters seeking to restore the scattered pieces of the ripped-apart Book of Happiness and bring happiness back to the world. Reviewers at Famitsu enjoyed the battle system, calling it innovative and saying that it made good use of the Nintendo DS hardware.

== Gameplay ==
The player uses the touchscreen during battles; they can attack enemies by drawing sword slashes.

Remindelight is an action role-playing game in which the player chooses one of four characters to play as, who have different abilities, weapons and magic styles for the player to use. These include Surf Flood, who can use fire magic but is mostly focused on sword fighting; Kuurie Le Grasseld, who can use a bow, but is focused on water magic; Tolon, who uses a spear and wind magic; and Enju Fullhorn, who uses an axe and earth magic. The player navigates the overworld, and uses the touchscreen to break obstacles; they can also touch enemies' sprites to engage in battle, and move to the separate battle mode.

Battles are presented in a first-person perspective, with status and commands displayed on the Nintendo DS's top screen, and action taking place in real time on the touchscreen, with enemies moving around. The player mainly makes use of the D-pad and touchscreen to defeat enemies: when it is their turn, the player inputs a command type with the D-pad directions, including "right" for attacking and "left" for defending. When defending, the player can use the touchscreen to drag around an outline of a shield on the screen, to protect the player character from incoming enemy attacks, and when attacking, the player can draw a line on the screen across an enemy, mimicking a sword slash. When using magic spells, the player needs to draw an arcane symbol on the screen. For some spells, they also need to blow into the system's microphone.

== Synopsis ==
The game begins with the Book of Happiness having been ripped apart into pieces called "happieces", which have been scattered around the world. Because of this, happiness is gone from the world; it can only be restored if the happieces are collected. Four people embark on a quest to do this: Surf Flood, a man from the Shiiru clan, who lives with his sister Selas, whose cheerfulness has faded; Kuurie Le Grasseld, a woman from the proper Kris clan, who acts ladylike when at home, but "like one of the guys" when away; Tolon, a boy from the Skoo clan of shapeshifters, who are identified by the feathers they wear due to their shifting appearances; and Enju Fullhorn, a man from the Ain clan, who unlike his fellow clan members is short and weak, and spends time reading books.

== Release and reception ==
The game was developed by Japan Art Media and published by Taito. They announced the game in July 2006, and released it for the Nintendo DS on September 28, 2006, in Japan. The game's title comes from how the player needs to remind saddened people of the delight that has been taken from them.

In their cross-review of the game, Famitsu's four reviewers gave it a score of 25/40, and praised the battle system for being innovative and making good use of the hardware, while also being fun and forcing the player to think about what strategies to use for each type of enemy. One of the reviewers liked how it was easy to pick up the game and start enjoying it quickly, something they considered rare for role-playing games released at the time, and how important information was easily readable on the screen.
