= TouchMaster =

2007 video game

- North American cover art for TouchMaster
- Developer: Midway Games
- Publishers: Midway Games; Warner Bros. Interactive Entertainment (TouchMaster 3)
- Platform: Nintendo DS
- Release: TouchMaster: NA: June 25, 2007; EU: July 5, 2007; AU: July 6, 2007; TouchMaster 2: NA: October 21, 2008; EU: October 31, 2008; AU: November 6, 2008; TouchMaster 3: NA: October 23, 2009; AU: December 2, 2009; EU: December 4, 2009; TouchMaster 4: EU: December 3, 2010; NA: December 7, 2010
- Genre: Video game compilation
- Modes: Single-player, multiplayer

TouchMaster is a video game created by Midway Games for the Nintendo DS. It supports Nintendo Wi-Fi Connection and was released on June 25, 2007, in North America. A sequel, Touchmaster 2 (More Touchmaster in Europe), was released on November 3, 2008. A second sequel, TouchMaster 3, was released on October 27, 2009. The fourth and final sequel, Touchmaster: Connect (Touchmaster 4: Connect in Europe), which used to allow players to post high scores to Facebook and Twitter, was released in 2010. Touchmaster tests the player's skills on the Nintendo DS with various games and challenges.

The games share the TouchMaster name with Midway's previous series of coin-operated touchscreen games.

== Included games ==
Gem Slide, Crystal Balls, Hot Hoops, Mahki, Mah Jong Pairs, Pond Kings, Pairs, Target 21, 3 Peak Deluxe, Phoenix 13, Power Cell, Solitaire Classic, Artifact, 5 Star Generals, Double Take, Go Wild, Uplift, Times Square, Word Search, Triple Elevens, Pick Up 6, Wordz, Trivia

== Reception ==
TouchMaster received a "Platinum" sales award from the Entertainment and Leisure Software Publishers Association (ELSPA), indicating sales of at least 300,000 copies in the United Kingdom.
