= List of Disney Interactive Studios games =

This is a list of video games that were published, co-published, or developed by Disney Interactive Studios and/or its preceding labels (Walt Disney Computer Software, Buena Vista Software, Disney Interactive, Buena Vista Games).

For a list of titles featuring Disney intellectual properties, including under license by third parties, see list of Disney video games.

== Releases ==
Game	Developer	Publisher	Release Date	Platform(s)	Note
Donald's Alphabet Chase	Westwood Associates	Walt Disney Computer Software	1988	Apple II	
Donald's Alphabet Chase	Westwood Associates	Walt Disney Computer Software	1988	MS-DOS	
Donald's Alphabet Chase	Westwood Associates	Walt Disney Computer Software	1988	Commodore 64	
Donald's Alphabet Chase	Westwood Associates	Walt Disney Computer Software	1991	Amstrad CPC	
Donald's Alphabet Chase	Westwood Associates	Walt Disney Computer Software	1991	ZX Spectrum	
Who Framed Roger Rabbit	Silent Software	Buena Vista Software	1988	MS-DOS	
Who Framed Roger Rabbit	Silent Software	Buena Vista Software	1988	Amiga	
Who Framed Roger Rabbit	Silent Software	Buena Vista Software	1988	Atari ST	
Who Framed Roger Rabbit	Silent Software	Buena Vista Software	1988	Commodore 64	
Who Framed Roger Rabbit	Silent Software	Buena Vista Software	1988	Apple II	
Mickey's Memory Challenge	Designer Software	Walt Disney Computer Software	1990	MS-DOS	Amiga version published by Infogrames
Goofy's Railway Express	Westwood Associates	Walt Disney Computer Software	1990	Amiga	
Goofy's Railway Express	Westwood Associates	Walt Disney Computer Software	1990	Atari ST	
Goofy's Railway Express	Westwood Associates	Walt Disney Computer Software	1990	Commodore 64	
Goofy's Railway Express	Westwood Associates	Walt Disney Computer Software	1991	MS-DOS	
DuckTales: The Quest for Gold	Incredible Technologies	Walt Disney Computer Software	1990	MS-DOS	
DuckTales: The Quest for Gold	Incredible Technologies	Walt Disney Computer Software	1990	Amiga	
DuckTales: The Quest for Gold	Incredible Technologies	Walt Disney Computer Software	1990	Atari ST	
DuckTales: The Quest for Gold	Incredible Technologies	Walt Disney Computer Software	1990	Commodore 64	
Disney Presents: The Animation Studio	Silent Software	Walt Disney Computer Software	1990	MS-DOS	
Disney Presents: The Animation Studio	Silent Software	Walt Disney Computer Software	1990	Amiga	
Disney Presents: The Animation Studio	Silent Software	Erbe Software	1990	Amiga	
Disney Presents: The Animation Studio	Silent Software	Infogrames	1990	Amiga	
The Rocketeer	NovaLogic	Walt Disney Computer Software	1991	MS-DOS	SNES Version published by Information Global Service
Mickey's Runaway Zoo	Westwood Associates	Walt Disney Computer Software	1991	MS-DOS	
Mickey's Runaway Zoo	Westwood Associates	Walt Disney Computer Software	1991	Amiga	
Mickey's Runaway Zoo	Westwood Associates	Walt Disney Computer Software	1991	Atari ST	
Mickey's Runaway Zoo	Westwood Associates	Walt Disney Computer Software	1991	Commodore 64	
Mickey's Jigsaw Puzzles	Novotrade International	Walt Disney Computer Software	1991	MS-DOS	Amiga version published by Infogrames
Mickey's Crossword Puzzle Maker	Legacy Software	Walt Disney Computer Software	1991	MS-DOS	
Mickey's Crossword Puzzle Maker	Legacy Software	Walt Disney Computer Software	1991	Apple II	
Mickey's Colors and Shapes	Sculptured Software	Walt Disney Computer Software	1991	MS-DOS	
Hare Raising Havoc	BlueSky Software	Walt Disney Computer Software	1991	MS-DOS	
Hare Raising Havoc	BlueSky Software	Walt Disney Computer Software	1992	Amiga	
Dick Tracy: The Crime-Solving Adventure	Distinctive Software	Walt Disney Computer Software	1991	MS-DOS	
Dick Tracy: The Crime-Solving Adventure	Distinctive Software	Walt Disney Computer Software	1991	Amiga	
Arachnophobia	BlueSky Software	Walt Disney Computer Software	1991	MS-DOS	
Arachnophobia	BlueSky Software	Walt Disney Computer Software	1991	Amiga	
Arachnophobia	BlueSky Software	Walt Disney Computer Software	1991	Commodore 64	
Arachnophobia	BlueSky Software	Walt Disney Computer Software	1991	Amstrad CPC	
Stunt Island	The Assembly Line	Walt Disney Computer Software	1992	MS-DOS	
Mickey's ABC's: A Day at the Fair	Distinctive Software	Walt Disney Computer Software	1992	MS-DOS	Amiga version published by Infogrames
Beauty and the Beast: Be Our Guest	Infogrames	Walt Disney Computer Software	1992	MS-DOS	
Heaven & Earth	Software Resources International	Buena Vista Software	1992	MS-DOS	
Heaven & Earth	Software Resources International	Buena Vista Software	1992	Macintosh	
Heaven & Earth	Software Resources International	Buena Vista Software	1992	FM Towns	
Mickey's 123's: The Big Surprise Party	Distinctive Software	Walt Disney Computer Software	1993	MS-DOS	
Mickey's 123's: The Big Surprise Party	Distinctive Software	Walt Disney Computer Software	1993	Amiga	
Follow the Reader	Distinctive Software	Walt Disney Computer Software	1993	MS-DOS	
Coaster	Code To Go	Walt Disney Computer Software	1993	MS-DOS	
Disney's Activity Center: Aladdin	Gryphon Software	Walt Disney Computer Software	1994	Microsoft Windows	
Disney's Activity Center: Aladdin	Gryphon Software	Disney Interactive	1995	Macintosh	
Disney's Animated Storybook: The Lion King	Media Station	Disney Interactive	1994	Microsoft Windows	
Disney's Animated Storybook: The Lion King	Media Station	Disney Interactive	1994	Macintosh	
The Jungle Book	East Point Software	Virgin Interactive	1995	Microsoft Windows	German "Disney Klassiker" Release
The Jungle Book	East Point Software	Disney Interactive	1995	Microsoft Windows	German "Disney Klassiker" Release
Disney's Aladdin	NMS Software	Virgin Interactive	1995	Game Boy	European budget release only
Disney's Aladdin	NMS Software	Disney Interactive	1995	Game Boy	European budget release only
Gargoyles	Disney Interactive	Buena Vista Interactive	1995	Sega Genesis	
Disney's Hot Shots: Timon and Pumbaa's Jungle Pinball	7th Level	Disney Interactive	1995	Microsoft Windows	
Disney's Hot Shots: Timon and Pumbaa's Jungle Pinball	7th Level	Disney Interactive	1995	Macintosh	
Disney's Animated Storybook: Winnie the Pooh and the Honey Tree	Media Station	Disney Interactive	1995	Microsoft Windows	
Timon & Pumbaa's Jungle Games	7th Level	Disney Interactive	1995	Microsoft Windows	
Timon & Pumbaa's Jungle Games	7th Level	Disney Interactive	1996	Macintosh	
Timon & Pumbaa's Jungle Games	Tiertex	Disney Interactive	1997	Super Nintendo Entertainment System	
Timon & Pumbaa's Jungle Games	Tiertex	THQ	1997	Super Nintendo Entertainment System	
Toy Story	Traveller's Tales	Disney Interactive	1995	Super Nintendo Entertainment System	
Toy Story	Traveller's Tales	Disney Interactive	1995	Sega Genesis	
Toy Story	Traveller's Tales	Disney Interactive	1995	Microsoft Windows	
Toy Story	Tiertex	Disney Interactive	1996	Game Boy	
Toy Story	Tiertex	Black Pearl Software	1996	Game Boy	
Maui Mallard in Cold Shadow	Disney Interactive	Disney Interactive	1995	Sega Genesis	
Maui Mallard in Cold Shadow	Eurocom	Disney Interactive	1995	Super Nintendo Entertainment System	
Maui Mallard in Cold Shadow	Disney Interactive	Disney Interactive	1996	Microsoft Windows	
Maui Mallard in Cold Shadow	Bonsai Entertainment	Disney Interactive	1997	Game Boy	
Pinocchio	Virgin Interactive	Disney Interactive	1995	Super Nintendo Entertainment System	
Pinocchio	Virgin Interactive	Disney Interactive	1996	Sega Genesis	
Pinocchio	NMS Software	Black Pearl Software	1996	Game Boy	
The Lion King	East Point Software	Virgin Interactive	1996	Microsoft Windows	German "Disney Klassiker" Release
The Lion King	East Point Software	Disney Interactive	1996	Microsoft Windows	German "Disney Klassiker" Release
Disney's Hot Shots: Timon and Pumbaa's Burper	7th Level	Disney Interactive	1996	Microsoft Windows	
Disney's Hot Shots: Timon and Pumbaa's Burper	7th Level	Disney Interactive	1996	Macintosh	
Disney's Aladdin	Virgin Games	Virgin Interactive	1997	Microsoft Windows	German "Disney Klassiker" Release
Disney's Aladdin	Virgin Games	Disney Interactive	1997	Microsoft Windows	German "Disney Klassiker" Release
Disney's Hot Shots: Cub Chase	Disney Interactive	Disney Interactive	1998	Microsoft Windows	
Disney's Hot Shots: Swampberry Sling	Disney Interactive	Disney Interactive	1998	Microsoft Windows	
A Bug's Life	Traveller's Tales	Sony Computer Entertainment	1998	PlayStation	
A Bug's Life	Traveller's Tales	Activision	1999	Nintendo 64	
A Bug's Life	Traveller's Tales	Disney Interactive	1999	Microsoft Windows	
The Emperor's New Groove	Argonaut Software	Sony Computer Entertainment	2000	PlayStation	
The Emperor's New Groove	Argonaut Software	Disney Interactive	2000	Microsoft Windows	
Disney's Aladdin	Crawfish Interactive	UbiSoft Entertainment Software	Nov 10, 2000 (EU) Nov 30, 2000 (NA)	Game Boy Color	
Disney's Aladdin	Crawfish Interactive	Disney Interactive	Nov 10, 2000 (EU) Nov 30, 2000 (NA)	Game Boy Color	
Disney's Aladdin	Capcom	Disney Interactive	August 1, 2003 (JP) Mar 19, 2004 (EU) Sep 28, 2004 (NA)	Game Boy Advance	Port of 1993 SNES Version published by Capcom

=== 1995 ===
- Disney Learning: Ready for Math With Pooh
- Disney Learning: Ready to Read With Pooh
- Disney Learning: The Jungle Book 1st Grade
- Disney's Animated Storybook: Toy Story
- The Lion King Activity Center

=== 1996 ===
- The Hunchback of Notre Dame: Topsy Turvy Games
- Pocahontas (Sega Genesis, Game Boy)

=== 1997 ===
- 101 Dalmatians Print Studio
- 101 Dalmatians: Escape from DeVil Manor
- Disney Learning: MathQuest with Aladdin
- Disney's Magic Artist
- Hercules Action Game (Published by Virgin Interactive Entertainment in US, and SCEE in Europe)
- Mickey's Dangerous Chase (Player's Choice)
- Nightmare Ned (Microsoft Windows)

=== 1998 ===
- A Bug's Life (Microsoft Windows, Nintendo 64, PlayStation, Game Boy Color)
- The D Show
- Disney Learning: Reading Quest with Aladdin
- Disney's Adventures in Typing With Timon and Pumbaa
- Disney Pixar Learning: 2nd & 3rd Grade
- Disney's Animated Storybook: Mulan
- Hades Challenge (PC/MAC)
- The Lion King 2: Simba's Pride Active Play (Windows 95, Windows 98, Windows Me)

=== 1999 ===
- Disney's Magic Artist Studio
- Disney Learning: Winnie the Pooh Preschool (Microsoft Windows)
- Disney Learning: Winnie the Pooh Toddler (Microsoft Windows)
- Disney's Animated Storybook: Winnie the Pooh and Tigger Too
- Disney's Arcade Frenzy
- Disney's Tarzan Activity Center
- Disney's Villains' Revenge
- Tarzan (Published by Sony Computer Entertainment on the PlayStation, and Activision on the Game Boy Color)
- Toy Story 2: Buzz Lightyear to the Rescue (Microsoft Windows, Nintendo 64, PlayStation, Dreamcast, Game Boy Color, PlayStation Network) (Published by Activision, THQ)
- Who Wants to Be a Millionaire (Developed by Jellyvision)

=== 2000 ===
- 102 Dalmatians: Puppies to the Rescue (Published by Eidos Interactive)
- Alice in Wonderland (Game Boy Color) (Published by Nintendo of America)
- Buzz Lightyear of Star Command (Microsoft Windows, PlayStation, Dreamcast, Game Boy Color) (Published by Activision)
- Dance Dance Revolution Disney Mix (Published and Developed by Konami)
- Dance Dance Revolution Disney's World Dancing Museum (Published and Developed by Konami)
- Dinosaur (Microsoft Windows, PlayStation, PlayStation 2, Dreamcast, Game Boy Color) (Published by Ubisoft)
- Disney's Doug's Big Game
- Disney's The Emperor's New Groove Activity Center
- Donald Duck: Goin' Quackers (Published and Developed by Ubi Soft)
- The Lion King: Simba's Mighty Adventure (Published by Activision) (PlayStation and Game Boy Color)
- Mickey's Speedway USA (Co-Published/Developed by Rare) (Nintendo 64, Game Boy Color)
- Disney's Mickey Saves The Day 3D Adventure (2000)
- Walt Disney World Quest: Magical Racing Tour (Published by Eidos Interactive) (Microsoft Windows, PlayStation, Dreamcast, Game Boy Color)
- Disney's Aladdin in Nasira's Revenge
- The Jungle Book Groove Party (2000) (Published by Ubisoft)
- Tigger's Honey Hunt (Published by NewKidCo)

=== 2001–2006 ===
Game	Developer	Publisher	Release date	Platform(s)	Note
Who Wants to Be a Millionaire - Second Edition	Jellyvision	Buena Vista Interactive	June 1, 2000 (NTSC)	Microsoft Windows	Released exclusively in North America
Who Wants to Be a Millionaire - Second Edition	Jellyvision	Sony Computer Entertainment	June 23, 2000 (NTSC)	PlayStation	Released exclusively in North America
Who Wants to Be a Millionaire - Second Edition	Eurocom Entertainment Software	THQ	September 25, 2000 (NTSC)	Game Boy Color	Released exclusively in North America
Disney's The Little Mermaid II	Blitz Games	THQ (NTSC); Sony Computer Entertainment (PAL)	September 25, 2000 (NTSC); June 19, 2001 (PAL)	PlayStation	
Disney's Donald Duck: Goin' Quackers; Disney's Donald Duck: Quack Attack	Ubi Soft Casablanca	Ubi Soft	November 16, 2000 (NTSC); December 15, 2000 (PAL)	Nintendo 64	
Disney's Donald Duck: Goin' Quackers; Disney's Donald Duck: Quack Attack	Ubi Soft Casablanca	Ubi Soft	November 16, 2000 (NTSC); December 15, 2000 (PAL)	Dreamcast	
Disney's Donald Duck: Goin' Quackers; Disney's Donald Duck: Quack Attack	Ubi Soft Casablanca	Disney Interactive	November 16, 2000 (NTSC); December 15, 2000 (PAL)	Microsoft Windows	
Disney's Donald Duck: Goin' Quackers; Disney's Donald Duck: Quack Attack	Ubi Soft Shanghai	Ubi Soft	November 16, 2000 (NTSC); December 15, 2000 (PAL)	PlayStation	
Disney's Donald Duck: Goin' Quackers; Disney's Donald Duck: Quack Attack	Ubi Soft Milan	Ubi Soft	November 16, 2000 (NTSC); December 15, 2000 (PAL)	Game Boy Color	
Disney's Donald Duck: Goin' Quackers; Disney's Donald Duck: Quack Attack	Ubi Soft Montreal	Ubi Soft	December 13, 2000 (NTSC); December 22, 2000 (PAL)	PlayStation 2	
Disney's Donald Duck Advance	Ubi Soft Shanghai	Ubi Soft	November 15, 2001 (NTSC); November 16, 2001 (PAL)	Game Boy Advance	
Disney's Donald Duck: Goin' Quackers; Disney's Donald Duck: Quack Attack	Ubi Soft Montreal	Ubi Soft	March 26, 2002 (NTSC); May 3, 2002 (PAL)	GameCube	
Disney's The Emperor's New Groove	Argonaut Games	Sony Computer Entertainment	November 16, 2001 (NTSC); February 16, 2001 (PAL)	PlayStation	
Disney's The Emperor's New Groove	Argonaut Games	Disney Interactive	November 20, 2001 (NTSC); February 16, 2001 (PAL)	Microsoft Windows	
Disney's The Emperor's New Groove	Sandbox Studios	Ubi Soft	December 14, 2000 (NTSC); March 16, 2001 (PAL)	Game Boy Color	
Who Wants to Be a Millionaire - Sports Edition	Buena Vista Interactive	Buena Vista Interactive	November 16, 2000 (NTSC)	Microsoft Windows	Released exclusively in North America
Dance Dance Revolution Disney's Rave; Dance Dance Revolution Disney Mix; Dancing Stage Disney Mix	Konami Computer Entertainment Tokyo	Konami	November 30, 2000 (Japan); September 18, 2001 (NTSC); September 28, 2001 (PAL)	PlayStation	
Disney's Aladdin in Nasira's Revenge	Argonaut Games	Sony Computer Entertainment	December 1, 2000 (PAL); March 14, 2001 (NTSC)	PlayStation	
Disney's Aladdin in Nasira's Revenge	Argonaut Games	Disney Interactive	December 1, 2000 (PAL); March 14, 2001 (NTSC)	Microsoft Windows	
Disney's Atlantis: The Lost Empire – Trial by Fire	Zombie Studios	Disney Interactive	May 18, 2001 (NTSC); October 19, 2001 (PAL)	Microsoft Windows	
Who Wants to Be a Millionaire - Third Edition	Jellyvision	Buena Vista Interactive	June 1, 2001 (NTSC)	Microsoft Windows	Released exclusively in North America
Who Wants to Be a Millionaire - Third Edition	Jellyvision	Sony Computer Entertainment	June 18, 2001	PlayStation	Released exclusively in North America
Disney's Atlantis: The Lost Empire	Eurocom Entertainment Software	Sony Computer Entertainment	June 14, 2001 (NTSC); October 19, 2001 (PAL)	PlayStation	
Disney's Atlantis: The Lost Empire	Eurocom Entertainment Software	THQ	June 14, 2001 (NTSC); October 19, 2001 (PAL)	Game Boy Color	
Disney's Atlantis: The Lost Empire	3d6 Games	THQ	September 19, 2001 (NTSC); October 19, 2001 (PAL)	Game Boy Advance	
Disney's Goofy's Fun House	The Code Monkeys	NewKidCo (NTSC); Ubi Soft (PAL)	June 25, 2001 (NTSC); December 7, 2001 (PAL)	PlayStation	
Disney's Extremely Goofy Skateboarding	Krome Studios	Disney Interactive	September 18, 2001 (NTSC); 2001 (PAL)	Microsoft Windows	
Who Wants to Be a Millionaire - Kids Edition	Buena Vista Interactive	Buena Vista Interactive	September 25, 2001 (NTSC)	Microsoft Windows	Released exclusively in North America
Monsters, Inc.	Vicarious Visions	THQ	October 26, 2001 (NTSC); February 1, 2002 (PAL)	Game Boy Color	
Monsters, Inc.	Natsume Co., Ltd.	THQ	October 26, 2001 (NTSC); February 1, 2002 (PAL)	Game Boy Advance	
Monsters, Inc.	Kodiak Interactive	Sony Computer Entertainment	March 20, 2002 (NTSC)	PlayStation 2	Released exclusively in North America
Monsters, Inc. Scare Island; Monsters, Inc. Scream Team	Artificial Mind and Movement	Disney Interactive	October 29, 2001 (NTSC); February 1, 2002 (PAL)	Microsoft Windows	
Monsters, Inc. Scare Island; Monsters, Inc. Scream Team	Artificial Mind and Movement	Sony Computer Entertainment	October 29, 2001 (NTSC); February 1, 2002 (PAL)	PlayStation	
Monsters, Inc. Scare Island; Monsters, Inc. Scream Team	Artificial Mind and Movement	Sony Computer Entertainment	February 1, 2002 (PAL)	PlayStation 2	Released exclusively in Europe
Disney's Tarzan: Untamed; Disney's Tarzan: Freeride	Ubi Soft Montreal	Ubi Soft	November 14, 2001 (NTSC); November 23, 2001 (PAL)	PlayStation 2	
Disney's Tarzan: Untamed; Disney's Tarzan: Freeride	Ubi Soft Montreal	Ubi Soft	November 18, 2001 (NTSC); May 3, 2002 (PAL)	GameCube	
Disney's Party Time with Winnie the Pooh; Disney's Pooh's Party Game: In Search of the Treasure	Doki Denki Studio	Electronic Arts (NTSC); Sony Computer Entertainment (PAL)	November 23, 2001 (PAL); November 28, 2001 (NTSC)	PlayStation	
Disney's Party Time with Winnie the Pooh; Disney's Pooh's Party Game: In Search of the Treasure	Doki Denki Studio	Disney Interactive	Late-2001 (PAL)	Microsoft Windows	Only released in Europe
Peter Pan in Disney's Return to Never Land; Disney's Peter Pan: Adventures in Never Land	Doki Denki Studio	Sony Computer Entertainment	February 13, 2002 (NTSC); March 15, 2002 (PAL)	PlayStation	
Peter Pan in Disney's Return to Never Land; Disney's Peter Pan: Adventures in Never Land	Doki Denki Studio	Disney Interactive	February 13, 2002 (NTSC); March 15, 2002 (PAL)	Microsoft Windows	
Disney's Peter Pan: Return to Never Land	Crawfish Interactive	Disney Interactive (NTSC); Ubi Soft (PAL)	February 22, 2002 (NTSC); March 28, 2002 (PAL)	Game Boy Advance	
Moop and Dreadly in the Treasure on Bing Bong Island	Hulabee Entertainment	Plaid Banana Entertainment (NTSC); Zoo Digital Publishing (PAL)	March 18, 2002 (NTSC); 2002 (PAL)	Microsoft Windows	
Ollo in the Sunny Valley Fair	Hulabee Entertainment	Plaid Banana Entertainment (NTSC); Zoo Digital Publishing (PAL)	March 18, 2002 (NTSC); 2002 (PAL)	Microsoft Windows	
Kingdom Hearts	Square	Square (Japan); Square Electronic Arts (NTSC); Sony Computer Entertainment (PAL)	March 28, 2002 (Japan); September 17, 2002 (NTSC); November 15, 2002 (PAL)	PlayStation 2	
Disney's Peter Pan: The Legend of Never Land	Blue 52 Games	Sony Computer Entertainment	April 8, 2002 (PAL)	PlayStation 2	Released exclusively in Europe
Disney Golf	T&E Soft	Capcom (Japan); Electronic Arts (NTSC); Disney Interactive (PAL)	May 30, 2002 (Japan); October 15, 2002 (NTSC); December 6, 2002 (PAL)	PlayStation 2	
Disney's Lilo & Stitch	Digital Eclipse	Disney Interactive (NTSC); Ubi Soft (PAL)	June 12, 2002 (NTSC); October 4, 2002 (PAL)	Game Boy Advance	
Disney's Lilo & Stitch; Disney's Lilo & Stitch: Trouble in Paradise	Blitz Games	Disney Interactive	June 18, 2002 (NTSC); September 20, 2002 (PAL)	Microsoft Windows	
Disney's Lilo & Stitch; Disney's Lilo & Stitch: Trouble in Paradise	Blitz Games	Sony Computer Entertainment	June 18, 2002 (NTSC); September 27, 2002 (PAL)	PlayStation	
Disney's Stitch: Experiment 626	High Voltage Software	Sony Computer Entertainment	June 18, 2002 (NTSC); September 27, 2002 (PAL)	PlayStation 2	
Spy Kids: Mega Mission Zone	Gorilla Systems	Disney Interactive (Note: Under Dimension Interactive brand)	June 27, 2002 (NTSC); 2002 (PAL)	Microsoft Windows	
Disney Sports Soccer; Disney Sports Football	Konami Computer Entertainment Osaka	Konami	July 18, 2002 (Japan); November 5, 2002 (NTSC); July 11, 2003 (PAL)	Game Boy Advance	
Disney Sports Soccer; Disney Sports Football	Konami Computer Entertainment Osaka	Konami	July 18, 2002 (Japan); November 12, 2002 (NTSC); February 7, 2003 (PAL)	GameCube	
Disney Sports Football	Konami Computer Entertainment Osaka	Konami	July 25, 2002 (Japan); November 25, 2002 (NTSC)	Game Boy Advance	
Disney Sports Football	Konami Computer Entertainment Osaka	Konami	December 12, 2002 (NTSC); December 17, 2002 (NTSC)	GameCube	
Disney Sports Skateboarding	Konami Computer Entertainment Osaka	Konami	July 25, 2002 (Japan); November 12, 2002 (NTSC); March 7, 2003 (PAL)	Game Boy Advance	
Disney Sports Skateboarding	Konami Computer Entertainment Osaka	Konami	September 19, 2002 (Japan); November 12, 2002 (NTSC); March 7, 2003 (PAL)	GameCube	
Disney's Party	Neverland	Hudson Soft (Japan); Electronic Arts (NTSC/PAL)	August 1, 2002 (Japan); September 16, 2003 (NTSC); October 17, 2003 (PAL)	GameCube	
Disney's Party	Jupiter	Electronic Arts (NTSC/PAL); Tomy (Japan)	September 16, 2003 (NTSC); October 10, 2003 (PAL); April 10, 2004 (Japan)	Game Boy Advance	
Disney's Magical Mirror Starring Mickey Mouse	Capcom	Nintendo of America	August 9, 2002 (Japan); August 13, 2002 (NTSC); September 13, 2002 (PAL)	GameCube	
Disney's Magical Quest Starring Mickey & Minnie	Capcom	Nintendo of America	August 9, 2002 (Japan); August 13, 2002 (NTSC); September 13, 2002 (PAL)	Game Boy Advance	
Power Rangers Wild Force	Natsume Co., Ltd.	THQ (Note: Under Buena Vista Interactive brand)	August 19, 2002 (NTSC); September 13, 2002 (PAL)	Game Boy Advance	
Spy Kids Challenger	Game Titan	Disney Interactive (Note: Under Dimension Interactive brand)	August 21, 2002 (NTSC)	Game Boy Advance	Only released in North America
Monsters, Inc. Scream Arena	Radical Entertainment	THQ	September 19, 2002 (NTSC); April 11, 2003 (PAL)	GameCube	
Disney's Tarzan: Return to the Jungle	Digital Eclipse	Activision	October 23, 2002 (NTSC); November 22, 2002 (PAL)	Game Boy Advance	
Disney's Treasure Planet	Bizarre Creations	Disney Interactive (NTSC); Ubi Soft (PAL)	November 12, 2002 (NTSC); February 7, 2003 (PAL)	Game Boy Advance	
Disney's Treasure Planet	Bizarre Creations	Sony Computer Entertainment	November 12, 2002 (NTSC); February 7, 2003 (PAL)	PlayStation 2	
Disney's Treasure Planet	Magenta Software	Sony Computer Entertainment	November 12, 2002 (NTSC); February 7, 2003 (PAL)	PlayStation	
Disney's Treasure Planet: Battle at Procyon	Barking Dog Studios	Disney Interactive	November 12, 2002 (NTSC); February 7, 2003 (PAL)	Microsoft Windows	
Disney's Kim Possible: Revenge of Monkey Fist; Disney's Kim Possible	Digital Eclipse	Disney Interactive (NTSC); THQ (PAL)	November 13, 2002 (NTSC); November 21, 2003 (PAL)	Game Boy Advance	
Disney Sports Basketball	Konami Computer Entertainment Osaka	Konami	November 25, 2002 (NTSC); December 19, 2002 (Japan); June 6, 2003 (PAL)	Game Boy Advance	
Disney Sports Basketball	Konami Computer Entertainment Osaka	Konami	December 19, 2002 (Japan); January 14, 2003 (NTSC); June 6, 2003 (PAL)	GameCube	
Disney's Treasure Planet: Training Academy; Disney's Treasure Planet: Mini Games	Hulabee Entertainment	Disney Interactive	2002 (NTSC); 2003 (PAL)	Microsoft Windows	Consists of three standalone titles that form the package - Etherium Rescue, Broadside Blast and Treasure Racer. A fourth game, Ship Shape, is unlocked when all three games are installed.
Disney Sports Snowboarding	Konami Computer Entertainment Osaka	Konami	January 16, 2003 (Japan); February 4, 2003 (NTSC); May 23, 2003 (PAL)	Game Boy Advance	
Disney Sports Motocross	Konami Computer Entertainment Osaka	Konami	February 13, 2003 (Japan); March 31, 2003 (NTSC); August 8, 2003 (PAL)	Game Boy Advance	
Disney's Piglet's Big Game	Doki Denki Studio	Gotham Games	March 21, 2003 (NTSC); July 2, 2003 (PAL)	PlayStation 2	
Disney's Piglet's Big Game	Doki Denki Studio	Gotham Games	March 21, 2003 (NTSC); July 2, 2003 (PAL)	GameCube	
Disney's Piglet's Big Game	Doki Denki Studio	Disney Interactive (NTSC); THQ (PAL)	March 21, 2003 (NTSC); July 2, 2003 (PAL)	Game Boy Advance	
Disney's Piglet's Big Game	Hulabee Entertainment	Disney Interactive	March 21, 2003 (NTSC); July 2, 2003 (PAL)	Microsoft Windows	
Disney Princess	Art Co., Ltd.	THQ	April 4, 2003 (NTSC); June 20, 2003 (PAL)	Game Boy Advance	
Finding Nemo	Traveller's Tales	THQ	May 9, 2003 (NTSC); September 26, 2003 (PAL)	PlayStation 2	
Finding Nemo	Traveller's Tales	THQ	May 9, 2003 (NTSC); September 26, 2003 (PAL)	GameCube	
Finding Nemo	Traveller's Tales	THQ	May 9, 2003 (NTSC); September 26, 2003 (PAL)	Xbox	
Finding Nemo	Vicarious Visions	THQ	May 9, 2003 (NTSC); September 26, 2003 (PAL)	Game Boy Advance	
Finding Nemo	KnowWonder	THQ	May 9, 2003 (NTSC); September 26, 2003 (PAL)	Microsoft Windows/Mac OS X	
Pirates of the Caribbean: The Curse of the Black Pearl	Pocket Studios	TDK Mediactive	June 19, 2003 (NTSC); October 24, 2003 (PAL)	Game Boy Advance	
Spy Kids 3-D: Game Over	Digital Eclipse	Disney Interactive (NTSC) (Note: Under Dimension Interactive brand); THQ (PAL)	June 30, 2003 (NTSC); November 21, 2003 (PAL)	Game Boy Advance	
Spy Kids 3-D: Game Over	Troublemaker Studios	Disney Interactive (Note: Under Dimension Interactive brand)	June 30, 2003 (NTSC)	Microsoft Windows	Released only in North America
Pirates of the Caribbean	Akella	Bethesda Softworks (NTSC); Ubi Soft (PAL)	July 8, 2003 (NTSC); August 15, 2003 (PAL)	Microsoft Windows	
Pirates of the Caribbean	Akella	Bethesda Softworks (NTSC); Ubi Soft (PAL)	July 8, 2003 (NTSC); September 5, 2003 (PAL)	Xbox	
Disney's Magical Quest 2 Starring Mickey & Minnie	Klein Computer Entertainment	Capcom	July 18, 2003 (Japan); August 28, 2003 (PAL); November 11, 2003 (NTSC)	Game Boy Advance	
Tron 2.0	Monolith Productions	Buena Vista Interactive	August 26, 2003 (NTSC); September 19, 2003 (PAL)	Microsoft Windows	
Tron 2.0	Monolith Productions	MacPlay	April 21, 2004 (NTSC)	Mac OS X	Only released in North America
Tron 2.0: Killer App	Digital Eclipse	Buena Vista Interactive	October 20, 2004 (NTSC); November 12, 2004 (PAL)	Game Boy Advance	
Tron 2.0: Killer App	Climax LA	Buena Vista Interactive	November 3, 2004 (NTSC); November 19, 2004 (PAL)	Xbox	
Disney's Extreme Skate Adventure	Toys for Bob	Activision	September 2, 2003 (NTSC); September 5, 2003 (PAL)	PlayStation 2	
Disney's Extreme Skate Adventure	Toys for Bob	Activision	September 2, 2003 (NTSC); September 5, 2003 (PAL)	GameCube	
Disney's Extreme Skate Adventure	Toys for Bob	Activision	September 2, 2003 (NTSC); September 5, 2003 (PAL)	Xbox	
Disney's Extreme Skate Adventure	Vicarious Visions	Activision	September 2, 2003 (NTSC); September 5, 2003 (PAL)	Game Boy Advance	
Power Rangers Ninja Storm	Natsume Co., Ltd.	THQ (Note: Under Buena Vista Interactive brand)	September 9, 2003 (NTSC); November 7, 2003 (PAL)	Game Boy Advance	
Power Rangers Ninja Storm	Artech Studios	THQ	September 12, 2003 (NTSC); 2003 (PAL)	Microsoft Windows	
Disney's The Lion King 1½; Disney's The Lion King	Vicarious Visions	Disney Interactive (NTSC); THQ (PAL)	October 7, 2003 (NTSC and PAL)	Game Boy Advance	
Lizzie McGuire: On the Go! Lizzie McGuire	Digital Eclipse	Disney Interactive (NTSC); THQ (PAL)	October 14, 2003 (NTSC); November 21, 2003 (PAL)	Game Boy Advance	
Disney's The Haunted Mansion	High Voltage Software	TDK Mediactive (NTSC); Take-Two Interactive (PAL)	October 16, 2003 (NTSC); March 5, 2004 (PAL)	PlayStation 2	
Disney's The Haunted Mansion	High Voltage Software	TDK Mediactive (NTSC); Take-Two Interactive (PAL)	October 16, 2003 (NTSC); March 5, 2004 (PAL)	Xbox	
Disney's The Haunted Mansion	High Voltage Software	TDK Mediactive (NTSC); Take-Two Interactive (PAL)	October 16, 2003 (NTSC)	GameCube	Released exclusively in North America
Disney's Mahjongg	Stunt Puppy Entertainment	Disney Interactive	October 16, 2003 (NTSC)	Microsoft Windows	Released exclusively in North America
Brother Bear	Vicarious Visions	Disney Interactive (NTSC); THQ (PAL)	November 4, 2003 (NTSC); November 21, 2003 (PAL)	Game Boy Advance	
Brother Bear	KnowWonder	Disney Interactive	November 11, 2003 (NTSC); November 28, 2003 (PAL)	Microsoft Windows	
Disney's Hide and Sneak	Capcom	Capcom	November 18, 2003 (NTSC); December 4, 2003 (Japan); March 19, 2004 (PAL)	GameCube	
Disney's Magical Quest 3 Starring Mickey & Donald	Klein Computer Entertainment	Capcom	November 21, 2003 (Japan); March 19, 2004 (Europe); June 14, 2005 (NTSC)	Game Boy Advance	
Disney presents Home on the Range: It's Hero Time! Disney's Home on the Range	Artificial Mind and Movement	Disney Interactive (NTSC); Buena Vista Games (PAL)	March 31, 2004 (NTSC); August 27, 2004 (PAL)	Game Boy Advance	
Alias	Acclaim Studios Cheltenham	Acclaim Entertainment (Note: Under Buena Vista Interactive brand)	April 6, 2004 (NTSC); April 8, 2004 (PAL)	PlayStation 2	
Alias	Acclaim Studios Cheltenham	Acclaim Entertainment	April 6, 2004 (NTSC); April 8, 2004 (PAL)	Xbox	
Alias	Acclaim Studios Cheltenham	Acclaim Entertainment	May 28, 2004 (PAL); June 17, 2004 (NTSC)	Microsoft Windows	
Disney's Kim Possible 2: Drakken's Demise; Disney's Kim Possible: Drakken's Demise	Artificial Mind and Movement	Disney Interactive (NTSC); Buena Vista Games (PAL)	September 15, 2004 (NTSC); 10 March 2006 (PAL)	Game Boy Advance	
Power Rangers: Dino Thunder	Pacific Coast Power & Light	THQ (Note: Under Buena Vista Interactive brand)	September 22, 2004 (NTSC); November 26, 2004 (PAL)	PlayStation 2	
Power Rangers: Dino Thunder	Pacific Coast Power & Light	THQ	September 22, 2004 (NTSC); November 26, 2004 (PAL)	GameCube	
Power Rangers: Dino Thunder	Natsume Co., Ltd.	THQ	September 22, 2004 (NTSC); November 26, 2004 (PAL)	Game Boy Advance	
Disney's Aladdin Chess Adventures	Fluent Entertainment	Sierra Entertainment; Strategy First (Note: Under Disney Interactive brand)	October 5, 2004 (NTSC); 2005 (PAL)	Microsoft Windows	
Disney's Lilo & Stitch 2: Hamsterviel Havoc; Disney's Lilo & Stitch 2	Climax	Disney Interactive (NTSC); Buena Vista Games (PAL)	October 12, 2004 (NTSC); November 12, 2004 (PAL)	Game Boy Advance	
That's So Raven	Vicarious Visions	Disney Interactive	October 12, 2004 (NTSC)	Game Boy Advance	Released exclusively in North America
Lizzie McGuire 2: Lizzie Diaries	Vicarious Visions	Disney Interactive	October 18, 2004 (NTSC)	Game Boy Advance	Released exclusively in North America
Tim Burton’s The Nightmare Before Christmas: Oogie's Revenge	Capcom Production Studio 3	Capcom (Note: Under Buena Vista Interactive brand) (Japan/PAL); Buena Vista Games (NTSC)	October 21, 2004 (Japan); September 30, 2005 (PAL); October 10, 2005 (NTSC)	PlayStation 2	
Tim Burton’s The Nightmare Before Christmas: Oogie's Revenge	Capcom Production Studio 3	Capcom (Note: Under Buena Vista Interactive brand) (PAL); Buena Vista Games (NTSC)	September 30, 2005 (PAL); October 10, 2005 (NTSC)	Xbox	
The Incredibles	Heavy Iron Studios	THQ	November 1, 2004 (NTSC); November 5, 2004 (PAL)	PlayStation 2	
The Incredibles	Heavy Iron Studios	THQ	November 1, 2004 (NTSC); November 5, 2004 (PAL)	GameCube	
The Incredibles	Heavy Iron Studios	THQ	November 1, 2004 (NTSC); November 5, 2004 (PAL)	Xbox	
The Incredibles	Helixe	THQ	November 1, 2004 (NTSC); November 5, 2004 (PAL)	Game Boy Advance	
The Incredibles	Beenox	THQ	November 1, 2004 (NTSC); November 5, 2004 (PAL)	Microsoft Windows/Mac OS X	
The Incredibles: When Danger Calls	ImaginEngine	THQ	November 3, 2004 (NTSC)	Microsoft Windows/Mac OS X	
Kingdom Hearts: Chain of Memories	Square Enix; Jupiter	Square Enix (Japan/NTSC); Nintendo of Europe (Europe)	November 11, 2004 (Japan); December 7, 2004 (North America); May 6, 2005 (PAL)	Game Boy Advance	
King Arthur	Krome Studios	Konami (Note: Under Buena Vista Interactive brand)	September 22, 2004 (NTSC); November 26, 2004 (PAL)	PlayStation 2	
King Arthur	Krome Studios	Konami	September 22, 2004 (NTSC); November 26, 2004 (PAL)	GameCube	
King Arthur	Krome Studios	Konami	September 22, 2004 (NTSC); November 26, 2004 (PAL)	Xbox	
Disney Move	Artificial Mind and Movement	Buena Vista Games (Note: Under Disney Interactive brand)	November 19, 2004 (Europe)	PlayStation 2	Released exclusively in Europe
Winnie the Pooh's Rumbly Tumbly Adventure	Phoenix Interactive	Ubisoft	February 15, 2005 (NTSC); March 11, 2005 (PAL)	PlayStation 2	
Winnie the Pooh's Rumbly Tumbly Adventure	Phoenix Interactive	Ubisoft	February 15, 2005 (NTSC); March 11, 2005 (PAL)	GameCube	
Winnie the Pooh's Rumbly Tumbly Adventure	Phoenix Interactive	Ubisoft	February 15, 2005 (NTSC); March 11, 2005 (PAL)	Game Boy Advance	
Disney's Kim Possible 3: Team Possible	Artificial Mind and Movement	Buena Vista Games (Note: Under Disney Interactive brand)	August 21, 2005 (NTSC)	Game Boy Advance	Only released in NTSC regions
That's So Raven 2: Supernatural Style	Artificial Mind and Movement	Buena Vista Games	August 21, 2005 (NTSC)	Game Boy Advance	Only released in NTSC regions
Lizzie McGuire 3: Homecoming Havoc	Climax	Buena Vista Games	August 21, 2005 (NTSC)	Game Boy Advance	Only released in NTSC regions
Power Rangers S.P.D.	Natsume Co., Ltd.	THQ (Note: Under Buena Vista Interactive brand)	September 6, 2005 (NTSC); February 3, 2006 (PAL)	Game Boy Advance	
Tim Burton's The Nightmare Before Christmas: The Pumpkin King	Tose	Buena Vista Games (Note: Under Buena Vista Interactive brand)	September 8, 2005 (Japan); October 10, 2005 (NTSC); November 10, 2005 (PAL)	Game Boy Advance	
Disney's Cinderella: Magical Dreams	DC Studios	Disney Interactive (NTSC); THQ (PAL)	September 20, 2005 (Japan); September 23, 2005 (PAL)	Game Boy Advance	
W.I.T.C.H.	Climax	Buena Vista Games (Note: Under Disney Interactive brand)	October 7, 2005 (PAL)	Game Boy Advance	Only released in PAL regions
Disney's Chicken Little	Avalanche Software	Buena Vista Games	October 18, 2005 (NTSC); February 10, 2006 (PAL)	PlayStation 2	
Disney's Chicken Little	Avalanche Software	Buena Vista Games	October 18, 2005 (NTSC); February 10, 2006 (PAL)	GameCube	
Disney's Chicken Little	Avalanche Software	Buena Vista Games	October 18, 2005 (NTSC); February 10, 2006 (PAL)	Xbox	
Disney's Chicken Little	Avalanche Software	Buena Vista Games	October 18, 2005 (NTSC); February 10, 2006 (PAL)	Microsoft Windows	
Disney's Chicken Little	Artificial Mind and Movement	Buena Vista Games	October 18, 2005 (NTSC); February 10, 2006 (PAL)	Game Boy Advance	
The Incredibles: Rise of the Underminer	Beenox	THQ	October 24, 2005 (NTSC); November 11, 2005 (PAL)	Microsoft Windows	
The Incredibles: Rise of the Underminer	Beenox	THQ	October 24, 2005 (NTSC); November 11, 2005 (PAL)	Mac OS X	
The Incredibles: Rise of the Underminer	Heavy Iron Studios	THQ	November 1, 2005 (NTSC); November 11, 2005 (PAL)	PlayStation 2	
The Incredibles: Rise of the Underminer	Heavy Iron Studios	THQ	November 1, 2005 (NTSC); November 11, 2005 (PAL)	Xbox	
The Incredibles: Rise of the Underminer	Helixe	THQ	November 1, 2005 (NTSC); November 11, 2005 (PAL)	Game Boy Advance	
The Incredibles: Rise of the Underminer	Helixe	THQ	November 1, 2005 (NTSC); November 11, 2005 (PAL)	Nintendo DS	
The Incredibles: Rise of the Underminer	Heavy Iron Studios	THQ	November 1, 2005 (NTSC); November 25, 2005 (PAL)	GameCube	
Disney's Kim Possible: Kimmunicator	Artificial Mind and Movement	Buena Vista Games	November 9, 2005 (NTSC); March 10, 2006 (PAL)	Game Boy Advance	
The Proud Family	Gorilla Systems	Buena Vista Games	November 13, 2005 (NTSC)	Game Boy Advance	Released only in North America
The Chronicles of Narnia: The Lion, the Witch and the Wardrobe	Traveller's Tales	Buena Vista Games	November 15, 2005 (NTSC); November 25, 2005 (PAL)	PlayStation 2	
The Chronicles of Narnia: The Lion, the Witch and the Wardrobe	Traveller's Tales	Buena Vista Games	November 15, 2005 (NTSC); November 25, 2005 (PAL)	Microsoft Windows	
The Chronicles of Narnia: The Lion, the Witch and the Wardrobe	Amaze Entertainment	Buena Vista Games	November 15, 2005 (NTSC); November 25, 2005 (PAL)	Game Boy Advance	
The Chronicles of Narnia: The Lion, the Witch and the Wardrobe	Amaze Entertainment	Buena Vista Games	November 15, 2005 (NTSC); November 25, 2005 (PAL)	Nintendo DS	
The Chronicles of Narnia: The Lion, the Witch and the Wardrobe	Traveller's Tales	Buena Vista Games	November 15, 2005 (NTSC); March 31, 2006 (PAL)	GameCube	
The Chronicles of Narnia: The Lion, the Witch and the Wardrobe	Traveller's Tales	Buena Vista Games	November 15, 2005 (NTSC); March 31, 2006 (PAL)	Xbox	
Kingdom Hearts II	Square Enix Product Development Division 1	Square Enix	December 22, 2005 (Japan); March 28, 2006 (NTSC); September 29, 2006 (PAL)	PlayStation 2	
The Wild	Climax Studios	Buena Vista Games	May 19, 2005 (PAL); September 8, 2006 (NTSC)	Game Boy Advance	
Cars	Rainbow Studios	THQ	June 6, 2006 (NTSC); July 14, 2006 (PAL)	PlayStation 2	
Cars	Rainbow Studios	THQ	June 6, 2006 (NTSC); July 14, 2006 (PAL)	GameCube	
Cars	Rainbow Studios	THQ	June 6, 2006 (NTSC); July 14, 2006 (PAL)	Xbox	
Cars	Beenox	THQ	June 6, 2006 (NTSC); July 14, 2006 (PAL)	Microsoft Windows/Mac OS X	
Cars	Locomotive Games	THQ	June 6, 2006 (NTSC); July 14, 2006 (PAL)	PlayStation Portable	
Cars	Helixe	THQ	June 6, 2006 (NTSC); July 14, 2006 (PAL)	Game Boy Advance	
Cars	Helixe	THQ	June 6, 2006 (NTSC); July 14, 2006 (PAL)	Nintendo DS	
Cars	Rainbow Studios	THQ	October 23, 2006 (NTSC); November 17, 2006 (PAL)	Xbox 360	
Cars	Incinerator Studios	THQ	November 19, 2006 (NTSC); December 8, 2006 (PAL)	Wii	
Cars: Radiator Springs Adventures	AWE Games	THQ	June 6, 2006 (NTSC); July 14, 2006 (PAL)	Microsoft Windows/Mac OS X	
Pirates of the Caribbean: Dead Man's Chest	Griptonite Games	Buena Vista Games	June 27, 2006 (NTSC); July 7, 2006 (PAL)	PlayStation Portable	
Pirates of the Caribbean: Dead Man's Chest	Amaze Entertainment	Buena Vista Games	June 27, 2006 (NTSC); July 7, 2006 (PAL)	Game Boy Advance	
Pirates of the Caribbean: Dead Man's Chest	Amaze Entertainment	Buena Vista Games	June 27, 2006 (NTSC); July 7, 2006 (PAL)	Nintendo DS	
Pirates of the Caribbean: The Legend of Jack Sparrow	7 Studios	Bethesda Softworks (NTSC); Ubisoft (PAL)	June 27, 2006 (NTSC); July 14, 2006 (PAL)	Microsoft Windows	
Pirates of the Caribbean: The Legend of Jack Sparrow	7 Studios	Bethesda Softworks (NTSC); Ubisoft (PAL)	June 27, 2006 (NTSC); July 14, 2006 (PAL)	PlayStation 2	
The Cheetah Girls	Gorilla Systems	Buena Vista Games	September 12, 2006 (NTSC)	Game Boy Advance	Only released in NTSC regions
Disney's Little Einsteins	InLight Entertainment	Buena Vista Games	September 12, 2006 (NTSC)	Game Boy Advance	Only released in NTSC regions
Phil of the Future	Handheld Games	Buena Vista Games	September 18, 2006 (NTSC)	Game Boy Advance	Only released in NTSC regions
The Suite Life of Zack & Cody: Tipton Trouble	Artificial Mind and Movement	Buena Vista Games	September 18, 2006 (NTSC)	Nintendo DS	Only released in NTSC regions
Desperate Housewives: The Game	Liquid Entertainment	Buena Vista Games	October 2, 2006 (NTSC); November 3, 2006 (PAL)	Microsoft Windows	
Disney's The Little Mermaid: Magic in Two Kingdoms	Gorilla Systems	Buena Vista Games	October 2, 2006 (NTSC); October 20, 2006 (PAL)	Game Boy Advance	
Disney's The Little Mermaid: Ariel's Undersea Adventure	Gorilla Systems	Buena Vista Games	October 2, 2006 (NTSC); October 20, 2006 (PAL)	Nintendo DS	
Disney Princess: Royal Adventure	Human Soft	Buena Vista Games	October 5, 2006 (NTSC); November 17, 2006 (PAL)	Game Boy Advance	
Hannah Montana	DC Studios	Buena Vista Games	October 9, 2006 (NTSC); 2007 (PAL)	Nintendo DS	
Disney's American Dragon: Jake Long - Rise of the Huntsclan	WayForward	Buena Vista Games	October 12, 2006 (NTSC); October 13, 2006 (PAL)	Game Boy Advance	
Disney's American Dragon: Jake Long - Attack of the Dark Dragon	WayForward	Buena Vista Games	October 12, 2006 (NTSC); October 13, 2006 (PAL)	Nintendo DS	
The Santa Clause 3: The Escape Clause	1st Playable Productions	Buena Vista Games	October 19, 2006 (NTSC)	Game Boy Advance	Only released in North America
The Suite Life of Zack & Cody: Tipton Caper	Artificial Mind and Movement	Buena Vista Games	October 19, 2006 (NTSC)	Game Boy Advance	Only released in North America
Disney's Kim Possible: What's the Switch?	Artificial Mind and Movement	Buena Vista Games	October 19, 2006 (NTSC); November 17, 2006 (PAL)	PlayStation 2	
That's So Raven: Psychic on the Scene	Handheld Games	Buena Vista Games	November 2, 2006 (NTSC)	Nintendo DS	Only released in North America
Lumines II	Q Entertainment	Buena Vista Games	November 7, 2006 (NTSC); November 17, 2006 (PAL)	PlayStation Portable	Published outside of Asia
Every Extend Extra	Q Entertainment	Buena Vista Games	November 7, 2006 (NTSC); February 9, 2007 (PAL)	PlayStation Portable	Published outside of Asia
Chicken Little: Ace in Action	DC Studios	Buena Vista Games	November 17, 2006 (PAL); November 21, 2006 (NTSC)	Nintendo DS	
Chicken Little: Ace in Action	Avalanche Software	Buena Vista Games	November 21, 2006 (NTSC); December 1, 2006 (PAL)	PlayStation 2	
Chicken Little: Ace in Action	Avalanche Software	Buena Vista Games	December 19, 2006 (NTSC); February 23, 2007 (PAL)	Wii	
Chicken Little: Ace in Action	Avalanche Software	Buena Vista Games	2007 (PAL)	Microsoft Windows	Only released in PAL regions
Disney's Kim Possible: Global Gemini	Artificial Mind and Movement	Buena Vista Games	February 9, 2007 (PAL); February 13, 2007 (NTSC)	Nintendo DS	
Lumines Plus	Q Entertainment	Buena Vista Games	February 16, 2007 (PAL); February 27, 2007 (NTSC)	PlayStation 2	
Spectrobes	Jupiter	Buena Vista Games	March 6, 2007 (NTSC); March 15, 2007 (Japan); March 16, 2007 (PAL)	Nintendo DS	
Meet the Robinsons	Avalanche Software	Buena Vista Games	March 27, 2007 (NTSC); March 30, 2007 (PAL)	PlayStation 2	
Meet the Robinsons	Avalanche Software	Buena Vista Games	March 27, 2007 (NTSC); March 30, 2007 (PAL)	Xbox 360	
Meet the Robinsons	Avalanche Software	Buena Vista Games	March 27, 2007 (NTSC); March 30, 2007 (PAL)	Wii	
Meet the Robinsons	Avalanche Software	Buena Vista Games	March 27, 2007 (NTSC); March 30, 2007 (PAL)	Microsoft Windows	
Meet the Robinsons	Climax Studios	Buena Vista Games	March 27, 2007 (NTSC); March 30, 2007 (PAL)	Game Boy Advance	
Meet the Robinsons	Altron	Buena Vista Games	March 27, 2007 (NTSC); March 30, 2007 (PAL)	Nintendo DS	
Meet the Robinsons	Avalanche Software	Buena Vista Games	March 27, 2007 (NTSC)	GameCube	Released exclusively in North America
Kingdom Hearts Re:Chain of Memories	Square Enix	Square Enix	March 29, 2007 (Japan); December 2, 2008 (NTSC)	PlayStation 2	
Pirates of the Caribbean: At World's End	Eurocom	Disney Interactive Studios	May 22, 2007 (NTSC); May 25, 2007 (PAL)	PlayStation 2	
Pirates of the Caribbean: At World's End	Eurocom	Disney Interactive Studios	May 22, 2007 (NTSC); May 25, 2007 (PAL)	PlayStation 3	
Pirates of the Caribbean: At World's End	Eurocom	Disney Interactive Studios	May 22, 2007 (NTSC); May 25, 2007 (PAL)	Xbox 360	
Pirates of the Caribbean: At World's End	Eurocom	Disney Interactive Studios	May 22, 2007 (NTSC); May 25, 2007 (PAL)	Wii	
Pirates of the Caribbean: At World's End	Eurocom	Disney Interactive Studios	May 22, 2007 (NTSC); May 25, 2007 (PAL)	PlayStation Portable	
Pirates of the Caribbean: At World's End	Amaze Entertainment	Disney Interactive Studios	May 22, 2007 (NTSC); May 25, 2007 (PAL)	Nintendo DS	
Pirates of the Caribbean: At World's End	Eurocom	Disney Interactive Studios	May 22, 2007 (NTSC); December 10, 2007 (PAL)	Microsoft Windows	
Anno 1701: Dawn of Discovery	Keen Games	Disney Interactive Studios (Touchstone)	June 8, 2007 (Germany); August 24, 2007 (Rest of Europe/Australia)	Nintendo DS	PAL-region rights only, published by Ubisoft in North America
High School Musical: Makin' the Cut!	Artificial Mind and Movement	Disney Interactive Studios	August 14, 2007 (NTSC); October 19, 2007 (PAL)	Nintendo DS	
The Cheetah Girls: Pop Star Sensations	Handheld Games	Disney Interactive Studios	October 9, 2007 (NTSC)	Nintendo DS	Released exclusively in North America
Disney Princess: Enchanted Journey	Papaya Studio	Disney Interactive Studios	October 16, 2007 (PAL); October 30, 2007 (NTSC)	PlayStation 2	
Disney Princess: Enchanted Journey	Papaya Studio	Disney Interactive Studios	October 16, 2007 (PAL); October 30, 2007 (NTSC)	Wii	
Disney Princess: Enchanted Journey	Papaya Studio	Disney Interactive Studios	October 16, 2007 (PAL); October 30, 2007 (NTSC)	Microsoft Windows	
Disney Princess: Magical Jewels	1st Playable Productions	Disney Interactive Studios	October 16, 2007 (PAL); October 30, 2007 (NTSC)	Nintendo DS	
The Suite Life of Zack & Cody: Circle of Spies	Artificial Mind and Movement	Disney Interactive Studios	October 18, 2007 (NTSC); April 4, 2008 (PAL)	Nintendo DS	
High School Musical: Sing It!	Artificial Mind and Movement	Disney Interactive Studios	October 26, 2007 (NTSC); November 9, 2007 (PAL)	PlayStation 2	
High School Musical: Sing It!	Artificial Mind and Movement	Disney Interactive Studios	October 26, 2007 (NTSC); November 16, 2007 (PAL)	Wii	
Power Rangers: Super Legends	Handheld Games	Disney Interactive Studios	October 26, 2007 (NTSC); November 2, 2007 (PAL)	Nintendo DS	
Power Rangers: Super Legends	Artificial Mind and Movement	Disney Interactive Studios	November 6, 2007 (NTSC); November 9, 2007 (PAL)	PlayStation 2	
Power Rangers: Super Legends	Artificial Mind and Movement	Disney Interactive Studios	November 6, 2007 (NTSC); November 9, 2007 (PAL)	Microsoft Windows	
Hannah Montana: Spotlight World Tour	Avalanche Software	Disney Interactive Studios	November 6, 2007 (NTSC); May 15, 2008 (PAL)	Wii	
Hannah Montana: Spotlight World Tour	Avalanche Software	Disney Interactive Studios	August 7, 2008 (NTSC); September 5, 2008 (PAL)	PlayStation 2	
Enchanted	Altron	Disney Interactive Studios	November 13, 2007 (NTSC); November 16, 2007 (PAL)	Nintendo DS	
Enchanted: Once Upon Andalasia	Artificial Mind and Movement	Disney Interactive Studios	November 13, 2007 (NTSC)	Game Boy Advance	Released only in North America
High School Musical: Livin' the Dream	Artificial Mind and Movement	Disney Interactive Studios	November 13, 2007 (NTSC)	Game Boy Advance	Released only in North America

=== 2007 ===
- The Cheetah Girls: Pop Star Sensations (2007)
- Disney Princess: Enchanted Journey (2007)
- Disney Princess: Magical Jewels (2007)
- Disney's Kim Possible: Global Gemini (2007) (Nintendo DS)
  - Hannah Montana: Spotlight World Tour (2007)
- High School Musical: Sing It! (PS2/Wii) (2007)
- High School Musical: Makin' the Cut! (DS) (2007)
- Kingdom Hearts Re:Chain of Memories (Co-Published/Developed by Square Enix) (2007)
- Meet the Robinsons (2007) (Microsoft Windows, Xbox 360, Wii, GameCube, PlayStation 2, Game Boy Advance, Nintendo DS)
- Pirates of the Caribbean: At World's End (2007) (Microsoft Windows, Xbox 360, Wii, PlayStation 2, PlayStation 3, Nintendo DS, PSP)
- Power Rangers: Super Legends (2007) (developed by A2M [home version] and Handheld Games [portable version]) (PlayStation 2, PC, Nintendo DS)
- Spectrobes (2007)
- The Suite Life of Zack & Cody: Circle of Spies (2007) (Game Boy Advance)
- Enchanted (Nintendo DS)

=== 2008 ===
- Bolt (2008) (Microsoft Windows, Xbox 360, Wii, PlayStation 2, PlayStation 3, Nintendo DS)
- The Cheetah Girls: Passport to Stardom (2008)
- The Chronicles of Narnia: Prince Caspian (2008) (Microsoft Windows, PlayStation 2, PlayStation 3, Nintendo DS, Wii, Xbox 360)
- Club Penguin: Elite Penguin Force (2008) (Nintendo DS)
- Cory in the House (2008) (Nintendo DS)
- Dance Dance Revolution Disney Channel Edition (2008) (Published and Developed by Konami)
- Disney Friends (2008) (Nintendo DS)
- Disney Sing It (2008)
- Disney Sing It! – High School Musical 3: Senior Year (2008)
- Disney Th!nk Fast (2008)
- High School Musical: Work This Out (DS) (2008)
- High School Musical 3: Senior Year Dance (PC/PS2/X360/Wii/DS) (2008)
- Kingdom Hearts coded (Co-Published/Developed by Square Enix) (2008)
- Phineas and Ferb (2008)(Nintendo DS)
- Pure, (2008) an off-road racing video game for Microsoft Windows, Xbox 360 and PlayStation 3
- Ratatouille (Published by THQ) (Microsoft Windows, Mac OS X, Xbox 360, Xbox, Wii, GameCube, PlayStation 2, PlayStation 3, Game Boy Advance, Nintendo DS, PSP) (2007)
- Spectrobes: Beyond the Portals (2008)
- SingStar Singalong with Disney (2008) (Published by SCEE)
- Turok (Published as Touchstone Games) (2008)
- Ultimate Band (2008)
- WALL-E (Co-Published by THQ) (Microsoft Windows, Xbox 360, Wii, PlayStation 2, PlayStation 3, Nintendo DS, PSP) (2008)

=== 2009 ===
- Cars: Race-O-Rama (2009) (Published by THQ) (Xbox 360, Wii, PlayStation 2, PlayStation 3, Nintendo DS, PSP)
- Dance Dance Revolution Disney Grooves (2009) (Published and Developed by Konami)
- Disney Sing It: Pop Hits (2009)
- G-Force: The Video Game (2009) (Microsoft Windows, Xbox 360, Wii, PlayStation 2, PlayStation 3, Nintendo DS, PSP)
- Hannah Montana: The Movie (2009)
- Hannah Montana: Rock Out the Show (2009)
- Kingdom Hearts 358/2 Days (Co-Published/Developed by Square Enix) (2009) (Nintendo DS)
- The Princess and the Frog (2009) (Microsoft Windows, Wii, Nintendo DS)
- Spectrobes: Origins (2009)
- Toy Story Mania! (2009 for Wii and iOS and 2012 for Xbox 360 and PlayStation 3) (Xbox 360, Wii, PlayStation 3, iOS)
- Up (Published by THQ) (Microsoft Windows, Xbox 360, Wii, PlayStation 2, PlayStation 3, Nintendo DS, PSP) (2009)
- Wizards of Waverly Place (2009) (Nintendo DS)
- Jonas L.A. (2009) (Nintendo DS)

=== 2010 ===
- Alice in Wonderland (Nintendo DS, Wii, Microsoft Windows, Zeebo)
- Cars Toon: Mater's Tall Tales (Wii)
- Camp Rock 2: The Final Jam (Nintendo DS)
- Club Penguin: Elite Penguin Force: Herbert's Revenge (Nintendo DS)
- Club Penguin: Game Day! (Wii)
- Disney Channel All Star Party (Wii)
- Disney Fairies: Tinker Bell's Adventure (Microsoft Windows)
- Disney Sing It: Family Hits
- Disney Sing It: Party Hits
- Epic Mickey (Wii)
- Guilty Party (Wii)
- Kingdom Hearts Birth by Sleep (co-Published/developed by Square Enix for PSP)
- Kingdom Hearts Re:coded (co-Published/developed by Square Enix for Nintendo DS)
- Phineas and Ferb: Ride Again (Nintendo DS)
- Sonny with a Chance (Nintendo DS)
- Split/Second: Velocity (developed by Black Rock Studio for Microsoft Windows, Xbox 360, PlayStation 3, PSP, and iOS)
- Tangled: The Video Game (Microsoft Windows, Wii, Nintendo DS)
- Tron: Evolution (Microsoft Windows, Xbox 360, PlayStation 3, Nintendo DS, PSP)
- Tron: Evolution - Battle Grids (Nintendo Wii)
- Toy Story 3: The Video Game (Microsoft Windows, Xbox 360, Wii, PlayStation 2, PlayStation 3, Nintendo DS, PSP)
- Wizards of Waverly Place: Spellbound (Nintendo DS)

=== 2011 ===
- Cars 2 (2011) (Microsoft Windows, Xbox 360, Wii, PlayStation 3, Nintendo DS, Nintendo 3DS, PSP)
- Disney Universe (2011) (Microsoft Windows, Xbox 360, Wii, PlayStation 3)
- Kinect Disneyland Adventures (Co-Published with Microsoft Studios) (2011) (Xbox 360)
- Lego Pirates of the Caribbean: The Video Game (developed by Traveller's Tales) (Microsoft Windows, Xbox 360, Wii, PlayStation 3, Nintendo DS, Nintendo 3DS, PSP) (2011)
- Phineas and Ferb: Across the 2nd Dimension (Wii, PlayStation 3, Nintendo DS, PSP, PlayStation Vita) (2011 for Wii, PS3, and DS and 2012 for PSP and PlayStation Vita)

=== 2012 ===
- Brave: The Video Game (2012) (Microsoft Windows, Xbox 360, Wii, PlayStation 3, Nintendo DS)
- Disney Princess: My Fairytale Adventure (2012)
- Epic Mickey 2: The Power of Two (2012) (Microsoft Windows, Xbox 360, Wii, PlayStation 3, Wii U, PlayStation Vita)
- Epic Mickey: Power of Illusion (2012) (Nintendo 3DS)
- Just Dance: Disney Party (2012) (Published by Ubisoft) (Xbox 360, Wii)
- Kinect Rush: A Disney-Pixar Adventure (Co-Published with Microsoft Studios) (2012) (Xbox 360)
- Kingdom Hearts 3D: Dream Drop Distance (Co-Published/Developed by Square Enix) (2012) (Nintendo 3DS)
- Wreck-it Ralph (Co-Published by Activision) (Wii, Nintendo DS, Nintendo 3DS) (2012)

=== 2013 ===
- Disney Infinity (2013) (Microsoft Windows, Xbox 360, Wii, PlayStation 3, Nintendo 3DS, Wii U)
- DuckTales: Remastered (Published by Capcom) (2013)
- Frozen: Olaf's Quest (2013) (Nintendo DS, Nintendo 3DS) (Published by GameMill Entertainment)
- Kingdom Hearts HD 1.5 Remix (Co-Published/Developed by Square Enix) (2013) (PlayStation 3)
- Phineas and Ferb: Quest for Cool Stuff (Xbox 360, Wii, Nintendo DS, Nintendo 3DS, Wii U) (2013)

=== 2014 ===
- Big Hero 6: Battle in the Bay (2014) (Nintendo DS, Nintendo 3DS) (Published by GameMill Entertainment)
- Disney Infinity 2.0: Marvel Super Heroes (2014) (Microsoft Windows, Xbox 360, PlayStation 3, PlayStation Vita, Wii U, Xbox One, PlayStation 4, iOS)
- Disney Magical World (2014) (Produced with Bandai Namco Games, published by Nintendo of America outside Japan) (Nintendo 3DS)
- Fantasia: Music Evolved (Xbox One, Xbox 360 Kinect)
- Kingdom Hearts HD 2.5 Remix (Co-Published/Developed by Square Enix) (2014) (PlayStation 3)

=== 2015 ===
- Disney Infinity 3.0: Star Wars (2015) (Microsoft Windows, Xbox 360, PlayStation 3, Wii U, Xbox One, PlayStation 4, iOS)
- Gravity Falls: Legend of the Gnome Gemulets (2015) (Published by Ubisoft) (Nintendo 3DS)
- Just Dance: Disney Party 2 (2015) (Published by Ubisoft)

=== Software and Educational Titles ===
- Disney's Activity Center (1994-2001)
- Mickey's Stickers & Stuff Printing Fun Kit (1997) (Windows)
- Disney Learning: Mickey Mouse Kindergarten (2000) (Microsoft Windows)
- Disney Learning: Mickey Mouse Preschool (2000) (Microsoft Windows)
- Disney Learning: Mickey Mouse Toddler (2000) (Microsoft Windows)
- Disney's 102 Dalmatians Activity Center (2000)
- Disney's Winnie the Pooh Activity Center (2000)
- Disney's Magic Artist 3D (2000)
- Disney Girlfriends (2001) (Microsoft Windows)
- Disney Learning: Phonics Quest (2001)
- Disney Learning: Winnie the Pooh Kindergarten (2001) (Microsoft Windows)
- Disney's Magic Artist Cartoon Maker (2001)
- Disney's Magic Artist Deluxe (2001)
- Disney's Tigger Activity Center (2001)
- Rolie Polie Olie: The Search for Spot (PC) (2001)
- Stanley: Wild for Sharks! (2002)
- Stanley: Tiger Tales (2001)
- Baby Einstein: Baby Newton: Fun with Shapes (Microsoft Windows)
- Disney Learning Adventure: Search for the Secret Keys (2002)
- Disney Princess: Magical Dress-Up (2002)
- Disney/Pixar's Toy Story 2 Activity Center (2002)
- My Disney Kitchen (2002) (Published by BAM! Entertainment, developed by Atlus)
- Baby Einstein: World of Discovery (V.Smile Baby)
- Disney Princess: Royal Horse Show (2003)
- The Wiggles: Wiggle Bay (2003) (PC) (US distribution)
- The Wiggles: Wiggly Party (2003) (PC) (US distribution)

== See also ==
- List of Disney video games
