= Spectrobes (video game) =

2007 video game

- European box art
- Developer: Jupiter
- Publisher: Buena Vista Games
- Director: Aguru Tanaka
- Producers: Kentaro Hisai; Hatao Ogata
- Artist: Kouji Kiriyama
- Writer: Hidemi Shimomura
- Composer: Masahiko Kimura
- Series: Spectrobes
- Platform: Nintendo DS
- Release: NA: March 6, 2007; AU: March 15, 2007; JP: March 15, 2007; EU: March 16, 2007
- Genre: Action role-playing
- Modes: Single-player, multiplayer

Spectrobes, known in Japan as Fossil Super-Evolution Spectrobes (Note: Japanese: 化石超進化スペクトロブス, Hepburn: Kaseki Chōshinka Supekutorobusu), is an action role-playing video game developed by Jupiter and published by Buena Vista Games (later renamed Disney Interactive Studios) for the Nintendo DS. Disney Interactive Studios has stated that Spectrobes is its first original intellectual property; that is, a game not based on any film or TV program from its parent company.

The game was considered a commercial success and Disney Interactive Studios announced that more than 700,000 copies of the game had shipped worldwide in the first month and it was the best-selling third-party (not published by Nintendo, Microsoft, or Sony) game for March 2007, ranking #7 over all that month.

The game was re-released in November 2007 as part of a special Spectrobes: Collector's Edition bundle, which included the game itself, all thirty-eight input code cards plus two exclusive Geo input cards, and a mini-guide.

== Gameplay ==
=== Nintendo Wi-Fi ===
The Download feature allowed the player to use DL (Downloader) Points earned from accessing the download system on Friday to purchase video clips, special Spectrobes, custom parts, minerals, and more.

The Upload feature allows players to upload their Sequence Battle scores from the Great Black Holes scattered on the various planets and moons in the Nanairo star system. In Sequence Battle, the player must win a certain number of Krawl battles to obtain the prize: an Evolve Mineral or a special Geo. Before beating the game, only one Great Black Hole is available to the player: in the Area 2 Desert of Nessa. Here, the prize is always an Evolve Mineral. After beating the game, six more Great Black Holes appear throughout Nanairo. The rest of the Geos may be obtained from these black holes.

== Plot ==
Out on a routine mission, Nanairo Planetary Patrol Officers Rallen and Jeena respond to a strange distress signal and discover the wreckage of an escape capsule in which an old man has been in a cryogenic sleep for over a decade. Once conscious, the man, whose name is Aldous, relays an unbelievable tale of the attack on his home planet by a vicious horde of creatures known as the Krawl. Rallen, Jeena, and Aldous then set out on a mission to save Nanairo from the destructive planet-eating Krawl.

After fighting the Krawl on five of Nanairo's seven planets, Rallen's boss, Commander Grant, reveals that the Krawl had established a base on the seventh planet, Meido; however, their spaceship is incapable of reaching this planet. Aldous reveals that ancient ruins found on one of the planets are actually a spaceship from an earlier civilization, and that it may be able to reach Meido. After gathering a number of Keystones, they are able to resurrect the spaceship and reach the Meido. After fighting through more hordes of Krawl, Rallen fights a large Krawl called Xelles that has the ability to heal whatever comes near it. After defeating it, Rallen fights a final Leader Krawl and kills it, thus ending the invasion - temporarily.

== Reception ==
Reception

Aggregate score
Aggregator	Score
Metacritic	63/100

Review scores
Publication	Score
Edge	5/10
Eurogamer	6/10
Famitsu	(DS+Wii) 29/40; 26/40
Game Informer	6.5/10
GamePro	3/5
GameSpot	6/10
GameSpy	2.5/5
GameTrailers	6.3/10
GameZone	6.9/10
IGN	7/10
Nintendo Power	8/10
Anime News Network	D
Detroit Free Press	2/4

The game received "mixed" reviews according to the review aggregation website Metacritic. In Japan, Famitsu gave it a score of one six, two sevens, and one six for a total of 26 out of 40, while Famitsu DS + Wii gave it a score of one eight and three sevens for a total of 29 out of 40.

Detroit Free Press said that "The character designs aren't on Pokémon's level, but the effort you devote to finding and raising these characters creates a level of attachment even Nintendo hasn't quite achieved." The Sydney Morning Herald said that the game is "Not what you might expect from Disney, Spectrobes is initially refreshing but quickly becomes dull." Anime News Network said that the game is "not necessarily a terrible game: in fact, it features quite a number of admirable traits. However, it's not a compelling one either. Gamers that have short attention spans and don't mind boring, repetitive gameplay may want to give it a try. However, everyone else will be wise to wait for the next true Pokémon releases to hit the system."

== Sequels ==
The sequel to Spectrobes, entitled Spectrobes: Beyond the Portals, was released in the U.S. on October 7, 2008. It features a new third-person 3-D field perspective and a map on the top screen. With this sequel, players can choose to play as either Rallen or Jeena. They are also able to play as the Spectrobes themselves when in battle. It was the second game to use Disney's online game and social network service DGamer, the first being The Chronicles of Narnia: Prince Caspian. The third and final game in the series, Spectrobes: Origins, was released for the Wii on August 18, 2009.
