= List of review-bombing incidents =

This is a timeline of major incidents of review bombing, a tactic where a large number of users purposefully post negative reviews of a product, a service, or a business on a review website in order to damage its sales or reputation.

== Video games ==
=== 2000s ===
Spore was review bombed on Amazon in 2008 after publisher Electronic Arts incorporated a digital rights management (DRM) system that limited buyers' ability to install the game more than three times. This system was meant to prevent piracy, but ultimately led to a coordinated backlash, with buyers feeling like they were "renting a broken game."

=== 2010s ===
The website Metacritic was criticized in 2011 for poor oversight of their user reviews, leading to rampant review bombing on popular games such as Bastion and Toy Soldiers: Cold War that brought their user rating to low levels. Mass Effect 3 was also review bombed on the site in 2012.

Titan Souls was review-bombed in April 2015 by supporters of YouTuber John "TotalBiscuit" Bain after the indie game's artist Andrew Gleeson mocked a statement that Bain made, saying the game was "absolutely not for [him]". Bain, in a following podcast, stated that the developer "has it out for [him]", leading several of his followers to review bomb the game, though Bain later expressed that he did not endorse that behavior.

The Elder Scrolls V: Skyrim was review bombed in 2015 by customers after the game's introduction of paid mods, leading Valve to reverse their decision and remove the paid mod functionality. Additional review bombs for Skyrim as well as fellow Bethesda Softworks game Fallout 4 occurred following the launch of Bethesda's Creation Club in September 2017, which reintroduced the potential for paid mods.

Nier: Automata was review bombed in April 2017 by Chinese players demanding a translation of the game to Chinese, whom PC Gamer called "a powerful new voice".

Grand Theft Auto V was review bombed throughout June and July 2017 after publisher Take-Two Interactive issued a cease-and-desist against the widely used game modification tool OpenIV, as an attempt to stop single-player and multiplayer mods for GTA V and Grand Theft Auto Online. The review bombing reduced Grand Theft Auto V's overall Steam review rating from "positive" to "mixed".

Crusader Kings II was review-bombed the same month by customers after Paradox had raised the prices in some regions.

In 2017, Valve changed policy to make unpaid games of any kind not count towards the game's review scores. The developer of Defender's Quest, Lars Doucet, stated that this policy prevented low-priced games from being review bombed. Dota 2 was review bombed in August 2017 after Marc Laidlaw, a former Valve writer for the Half-Life series, posted a "fanfic" on his personal blog that several journalists deduced was the plot for Half-Life 2: Episode 3, which had been planned for release in 2007, but appeared to have become vaporware within Valve. Players were upset that the episode had not been released, and review-bombed Dota 2, believing that Valve's backing of the game led them to drop work on the Half-Life series. That same month, Steam users review bombed Sonic Mania in protest of its use of Denuvo DRM, which was not disclosed by Sega on the game's store page on launch day. Sega responded by claiming the 'offline play bug' had been patched, and a Denuvo warning was added to the game's Steam page.

Firewatch was review-bombed on Steam in September 2017 after its developer Campo Santo responded to an incident where the YouTuber PewDiePie uttered a racial slur during an unrelated livestream by issuing a false DMCA takedown against PewDiePie's videos of their game. Campo Santo justified this by stating that they did not want someone with PewDiePie's ideology to be associated with their game. A large number of users issued negative reviews of Firewatch, claiming that Campo Santo were "social justice warriors" or were supporting "censorship". The head of Campo Santo, Sean Vanaman, later expressed "regret" over issuing the takedown notice.

In October 2017, PlayerUnknown's Battlegrounds was review bombed, primarily by Chinese players, after an advert for a VPN service was shown in game. As the internet in China is highly regulated, VPN servers have been used by some players to bypass Chinese regulations and play on servers in other regions. The promotion of such VPN products was poorly received because players believed developer Bluehole should introduce servers local to the region instead of encouraging Chinese players to pay for VPNs. The review bomb may also be tied to the fact that the product, which is not free-to-play, included advertising support, which has yet to occur for the game in any other region worldwide. Kerbal Space Program was similarly review bombed by Chinese players after the developers Squad changed a line of Chinese text on one of the game's assets inspired by a quotation from Chairman Mao Zedong. Due to variations of interpretation of the Chinese saying, this line was perceived as sexist by some players. The replacement line lacked such confusion but also distorted the original meaning, leading those upset with the change to respond with negative reviews.

Star Wars: Battlefront II was review-bombed on Metacritic upon its launch in November 2017 in response to the design of the game's microtransactions and loot boxes. Many saw the game as being pay-to-win during its pre-release beta trials as the unlocking of new content and characters significantly favoured those who paid for them with real money. In response to the backlash, Electronic Arts altered the progression and economic system to make it fairer to players, and the day before release, disabled the microtransactions entirely, stating that they would be re-introduced at a later date. In March 2018, developer DICE announced an overhaul for the system, stating that all content would be purely cosmetic, will not affect gameplay, and would only be purchasable through in-game currency. The changes were released across March and April 2018.

The Creative Assembly's Total War: Rome II, initially released in 2013, had been patched in early 2018 to add female characters, with a random chance for some of them to be generals. When an image circulated of the game showing one player's armies all led by female generals, users on Steam complained about the historical accuracy. A female community content manager stated Creative Assembly's stance: that the game was meant to be "historically authentic, not historically accurate", but a portion of these users began to review bomb the title on Steam, believing that the content manager was pushing a personal agenda. Player-created mods that allowed players to control the probability of women generals appearing became popular on Steam.

The launch of the Epic Games Store—a competing storefront to Steam—in December 2018 has been the focal point of a number of review bombs, as Epic has secured time-limited exclusive sales for new games in series that have traditionally been on Steam, with those leaving reviews on the older games on Steam upset at this exclusivity. This includes Metro Exodus, the third game in the Metro series, and Borderlands 3 from the Borderlands series. As the Epic Games Store interface has purposely omitted user reviews, these users have turned to the review pages on Steam for related products (such as Borderlands 2) to review-bomb the game.

Devotion by Taiwanese studio Red Candle Games was review-bombed by Chinese players after they discovered an in-game poster that referenced the meme of Chinese Communist Party general secretary Xi Jinping censoring the character Winnie the Pooh. While Red Candle stated the poster was not meant to be in the final game and took it out on the next immediate patch, the game still received negative user reviews, forcing Red Candle to terminate their publishing deals and pull the game from distribution.

Nintendo's Fire Emblem: Three Houses and Astral Chain were both review-bombed on Metacritic shortly after their launches in July and August respectively for being exclusive to the Nintendo Switch, presumably by users of other platforms who were not aware that the critically acclaimed titles were owned by Nintendo. These reviews were removed by Metacritic in early September, restoring the games' user scores to their original "generally favorable" and "universal acclaim" scores of 8.7 and 9.0 respectively.

Gears 5 was review-bombed on Steam primarily by players from China after the game was pulled from sale in that region by its developer, The Coalition. While the reason for the game's removal was not officially stated, it may have been pulled by order of the Chinese government due to the inclusion of LGBT+ Pride flags that players can use as decals.

Call of Duty: Modern Warfare was review bombed on Metacritic in October 2019 by users who were angered at the American-developed game's depiction of the Russian military. In particular, the campaign's portrayal of an area attacked by Russian forces dubbed "the highway of death" drew outrage from its apparent similarities to the real-life Highway of Death that suffered devastation as a result of an attack led by American forces during the Gulf War.

Death Stranding was review bombed on Metacritic upon its launch in November 2019, receiving over 15,000 user reviews half a month after release and bringing the overall user score to around 5.5/10. Publications noted that the user score bombings were both positive and negative, although they found there were more of the latter. The review bombing was deduced to have stemmed from players who were disappointed with the game, which had been widely anticipated but released to "divisive" reviews by critics, as well as PlayStation users who were upset that the game would be ported to personal computers a year later in 2020. In early December 2019, Metacritic removed many user reviews categorized as negative, increasing the user score.

Pokémon Sword and Shield was review-bombed on Metacritic upon release in November 2019, following complaints from fans about the exclusion of Pokémon from previous games in the series, as well as quality concerns brought about by apparent evidence that Game Freak had lied about some aspects of the game's development. The bombing brought the user scores for Sword and Shield down to 4.6 and 4.4 respectively both indicating "generally unfavorable" reviews.

=== 2020s ===
Warcraft III: Reforged, a remaster of 2002's Warcraft III: Reign of Chaos, was review-bombed on Metacritic upon release in January 2020, reaching a low score of 0.5, indicating "overwhelming dislike", several days later based on over 14,000 reviews, making it the lowest-ranked game on the site by user score. The game itself received mixed reviews from critics with an aggregate score of 60 out of 100, as of February 2020. These reviews cited the poor quality of the remaster, lacking some of the features that Blizzard had previously said would be in the game, such as improved cutscenes and user interface, and that it felt like a half-finished product. However, the review bomb was focused on additional issues beyond the game's quality. The game was released as a mandatory update to the original Warcraft III: Reign of Chaos due to it using Reforged's client, which prevented players from reverting to play the original Warcraft III, even if they had not purchased the remastered version. Additionally, those players criticized the terms of use policy that gave Blizzard ownership over all user-authored works made in the remaster.

AI: The Somnium Files was review-bombed on Metacritic in February 2020, and the user review scores for Crystar and Metal Torrent were inflated at around the same time. A ResetEra user named "Krvavi Abadas" claimed that he single-handedly review-bombed AI because he disliked how the character A-Set was treated, and he affected all three games because he wanted to prove the lack of anti-review bombing protections in Metacritic's user review system.

Animal Crossing: New Horizons was review-bombed on Metacritic upon release in March 2020, with its lowest score reaching 5.0, indicating "Mixed or Average Reviews". Users were largely frustrated by the limitations of the game's local co-op and multiplayer progression.

Doom Eternal had shipped for personal computer versions without a digital rights management (DRM) package, though this appeared to be an oversight based on how it was packaged and reported in packaging materials; a secondary Denuvo Anti-Cheat solution was added in by a patch in May 2020. This led to a review bomb from users, due to the requirement of Ring 0 (also known as kernel mode) access to the computer system and the potential for security vulnerabilities.

The Last of Us Part II was review-bombed on Metacritic upon release in June 2020, with a score of 3.5, indicating "generally unfavorable" reviews, based on almost 30,000 reviews within two days. Publications attributed the negative reactions to initially stemming from plot leaks in April 2020, which had ignited backlash from fans of the predecessor The Last of Us. Negativity was directed towards the story and characters, additionally citing the inclusion of "social justice warrior" content and monotonous gameplay. Online harassment and death threats were also directed at certain members of the game's cast and development team.

Monster Hunter World (released in 2018) was review-bombed by Chinese users after the 2020 film Monster Hunter opened in the region, but had been quickly pulled after lines of dialogue in the film were seen as a reference to a racist playground chant against Asians. While developer Capcom had provided input for the film, they stated they were unaware of the dialogue, as it was made by a different company.

Madden NFL 21, a 2020 American football video game, was review-bombed on Metacritic. Players criticized EA Sports, the series' publisher, for making minimal updates to the game. Madden 21 holds the lowest user rating on Metacritic with a score of 0.4, indicating "overwhelming dislike".

Superhot Team, the developers of Superhot VR (released in 2019), had previously included a toggle in the game that would skip certain in-game scenes that depicted self-harm (such as shooting oneself in the head or jumping off a tall building). In July 2021, the developers opted to patch the game to completely remove these scenes, stating that "Considering [the] sensitive time we're living in, we can do better than that. You deserve better." and that these scenes had "no place" in the game. Shortly after releasing the patch, the game was review bombed on Steam, with negative user reviews claiming that Superhot Team was capitulating to "snowflakes".

Life Is Strange: True Colors was review bombed by Chinese players upon release for the inclusion of the flag of Tibet (seen outside of a Tibetian shop in-game), related to the conflict of Tibet's sovereignty from China.

The addition of the 2016 Hitman to GOG.com, which normally offers DRM-free games, was reviewed-bombed on GOG.com due to various activities within the single-player game requiring an online connection to be able to complete.

Genshin Impact was review-bombed on the Google Play Store as a result of some players being dissatisfied with the extent of the game's free premium content for its first anniversary. Viewing the reviews as bot attacks, the reviews were removed by the GPG's automated systems.

Grand Theft Auto: The Trilogy – The Definitive Edition, a remastered compilation of three games from the Grand Theft Auto series, was review-bombed on Metacritic due to players being displeased with numerous graphical and technical issues with the game. In addition, the personal computer version had been pulled from sale a day after its November 11, 2021, launch and made unplayable due to its removal from the Rockstar game launcher, resulting in some players demanding refunds. Rockstar stated that the game was pulled to "remove files unintentionally included" in the distribution, and restored it for sale by November 14, 2021, stating "We sincerely apologize for the inconvenience, and are working to improve and update overall performance as we move forward."

Blue Archive was review-bombed on the Google Play Store due to a scene depicting nudity being cropped in the global version of the game, despite program director Kim Yong-ha promising in an interview that the team would not alter any in-game illustrations for the international release. Kim later issued an apology on Blue Archive's Twitter account saying the censorship was due to "external requests" and "because every region has different service circumstances, inevitable modification requests can occur".

Tabletop Simulator was review-bombed in January 2022 after it was discovered that the automatic moderation of the game's global chat, aimed at preventing homophobic and transphobic insults, also triggered on positive statements related to LGBT, specifically blocking a user who admitted their sexuality. The game's developers, Berserk Games, disabled the global chat and said they would assess the moderation system before bringing the chat back.

Gran Turismo 7 was review-bombed on Metacritic in March 2022, following updates made to the game; it received the lowest Metacritic user score for a game published by Sony, with a score of 2.5, indicating "generally unfavorable" reviews. Users expressed criticism towards its focus on microtransactions, including the real-world cost of certain items, and grinding. Further negative reactions targeted reductions to the amount of in-game rewards, as well as an outage that lasted 30 hours which barred the use of most of the game's modes. The same month, developer Polyphony announced they would implement future updates to make progression fairer, and compensated players with free in-game currency.

VRChat was review bombed on Steam in July 2022 following an update that implemented Easy Anti-Cheat to counter "malicious" mods from players. Despite modding of the game being technically disallowed, players criticized the decision, as mods have been used to improve the game's accessibility, user safety, and performance.

Sonic Frontiers was review-bombed on Metacritic shortly after its release in November 2022, when YouTuber videogamedunkey published a negative review of the game. To demonstrate his opinion that the game did not deserve its Metacritic user score of 8.8, the review ends with a compilation comparing the game's score to popular games that had lower scores on the site. In response to being blamed for the review bombing that followed, Dunkey claimed on Twitter that the negative reviews were actually being left by Sonic fans in order to "make [his] fans look bad". Some positive reviews, which expressed disagreement with Dunkey's video, were also added.

War Thunder was review-bombed in May 2023 in response to recent controversial economic changes within the game. The game developers quickly reverted the economic change, announced a revision of the economy for mid-summer 2023 and issued an apology.

In June 2023, Skullgirls was review-bombed on Steam after developers made several alterations to the game's content (including editing out references to Nazi symbolism, censoring panty shots of the teenage character Filia, and removing a scene of police brutality against black character Big Band).

In August 2023, upon the release of Overwatch 2 on Steam, it was subject to review bombing and became the worst rated game on that platform within 48 hours. Many reviews were about the cancellation of promised content, abundance of microtransactions, the sexual harassment of female employees at Activision Blizzard, or the shutdown of the first Overwatch. Nearly two-thirds of these reviews were written in Simplified Chinese, which according to Niko Partners, stems from Blizzard's dissolvement of its agreement with NetEase in China earlier in 2023, leaving Chinese players unable to play on local servers. Several joke reviews were also created to promote Team Fortress 2, and the "most helpful" review on the platform was one declaring Overwatch porn to be better than the game itself.

In October 2023, Stormworks: Build and Rescue was review bombed after adding the Space DLC. The expansion came with a rework of the video game's physics, which inadvertently broke a significant portion of the game's user-based workshop content and sparked major outrage amongst its player base on its related social media sites. There were issues such as Steam-based and other related builds not working correctly, aerial vehicles not flying due to lack of power from engines or from lack of aerodynamic lift, and many user-created boats being unable to float at all. These issues were fixed days later with a series of bug fixes, although some of the issues, mainly relating to pressure in pre-update ship sinking, persist.

In November 2023, following early critical reception of Call of Duty: Modern Warfare III before its official release, 2011's Call of Duty: Modern Warfare 3 was review bombed on Metacritic, bringing the user score as low as a 3.5 as of November 7. IGN's Wesley Yin-Poole attributed the 2011 game being review bombed to users mistaking it for the 2023 game due to their similar titles, and confirmed Metacritic was in the process of removing these reviews.

In January 2024, the PC version of Resident Evil Revelations, originally released in 2013, was review bombed on Steam following a new update from Capcom that added a new DRM package called Enigma Protector to the game, and the discovery that it had already been added to multiple other Capcom games in the months prior, with the company seemingly planning to eventually add it to their entire back catalog as part of a new hardline stance against video game modding. In addition to serving as standard DRM, Enigma also prevents the use of mods and results in reduced performance for games that have it. In response to the review bombing, Capcom removed Enigma from Resident Evil Revelations and their other games that had it, but stated that this was only temporary and the software would be added again once the performance issues were resolved.

In April 2024, the PC version of Stardew Valley, a farming simulation game that had received nearly universal acclaim, was review bombed by Chinese players due to issues in the Chinese translation of the game in the recent 1.6.4 update. According to a few players, some of the translations could be "incorrect" or seen as "rude" to native speakers, causing NPCs to appear meaner than they are supposed to be. Additionally, the situation was made worse when the Chinese translation team ignored all feedback and replied in a passive-aggressive tone. Eventually, ConcernedApe, the developer of Stardew Valley, apologized and reverted the Chinese translation to the previous 1.6.3 version.

In May 2024, with the announcement of Take-Two Interactive closing down Intercept Games, the developers of Kerbal Space Program 2, the game was review-bombed on Steam. Players noted that, with the game in its current state, the closure of the studio meant it was effectively "dead" and warned others not to purchase it. Take-Two clarified to IGN that Private Division will continue to update the game. As of April 2026, updates for the game have not continued.

Helldivers 2, which had been released in February 2024 and generally had high user reviews, was review-bombed on Steam after Sony opted to require all players on Steam to link to a PlayStation Network account by the end of May 2024; Sony stated that this was necessary to ensure the "safety and security" of the game's community and implement banning of griefing players, and that they had not implemented this at release due to technical issues. Further, access to the PlayStation Network was not available to many regions where Steam is supported. While the developer Arrowhead Game Studios stated that players in these countries should not be affected by this requirement, Sony began to delist the game from these regions just before the mandatory date for account linking. As a result, over 200k negative reviews were left for the game within 48 hours of Sony's announcement, a combination of the unavailability of a solution for those affected regions, and concerns related to the security of the PlayStation Network. Within a few days, Sony announced that from the negative feedback that they would currently not be going forward with the account linking plans, and work with Arrowhead to find alternate solutions for player protection. Following this decision, a community-driven effort was made to reverse the review bombing by having users remove their negative reviews.

In June 2024, Team Fortress 2 players review-bombed the game on Steam in protest of developer Valve's perceived negligence of the game after bot accounts had been disrupting the player experience since early 2020. The review bomb caused the game's overall recent review rating to drop to "Overwhelmingly Negative".

Mario Kart World was review-bombed on Metacritic after the release of version 1.1.2 on June 25, 2025, which drew significant backlash after it made the "Random" option for selecting the next course online select unpopular connecting tracks (commonly called intermissions). As a result, the game’s user score dropped from 8.3 to as low as 7.0 within days of the update, making it go from "generally favorable" to "mixed or average." It has not recovered since.

Upon its release in October 2025, Pokémon Legends: Z-A was review-bombed on Metacritic due to factors such as the price, the quality of the visuals, lack of voice acting, the size of the map, and the general poor quality of the Pokémon games on the Nintendo Switch. The review bomb caused the game's overall review rating to drop as low as 4.3 indicating "generally unfavorable" reviews, making it the second lowest reviewed mainline Pokémon game behind Pokémon Scarlet and Violet.

Call of Duty: Black Ops 7 was review bombed on Metacritic and Steam for a variety of reasons, including the poorly received co-op campaign, controversial in-game cosmetics from previous Call of Duty games, franchise oversaturation due to its yearly release schedule, usage of generative artificial intelligence for in-game assets, and strong competition like Battlefield 6 and Arc Raiders.

In 2026, Cory in the House was "reverse" review-bombed with positive reviews on Metacritic due to an influx of memes surrounding the game. As a result, Cory in the House dethroned Clair Obscur: Expedition 33 as one of the highest reviewed games on Metacritic.

In April 2026, an independent video game on Steam called Bohrdom was review-bombed after the developer, Cole Allen, perpetrated the 2026 White House Correspondents' Dinner shooting. Before the attempted attack, Bohrdom was released at the end of 2018 and had little to no attention or reception. The game was hit with negative reviews as well as sarcastic positive reviews, with troll messages making fun of Allen for the shooting.

Slay the Spire II was review bombed at least three times since its early access release in 2026. Two of these were related to balance changes made in the game's beta branch, and primarily originated from China, where means to communicate with the developers MegaCrit were limited. The third occurred after Anita Sarkeesian was identified as a consultant for the game, and was an aftereffect of the Gamergate harassment campaign in which she had been targeted before.

In September 2026, Hearts of Iron IV was review-bombed on Steam by Turkish players after a user was banned from the official Discord server for using a portrait of Mustafa Kemal Atatürk as their profile picture. The backlash intensified when leaked moderator discussions linked Atatürk to the 1915 Armenian genocide, leading to mass boycott calls and the game receiving its highest number of negative reviews in a single day since its 2016 release. In response, Valve flagged the reviews as "off-topic review activity", while Paradox Interactive announced an internal policy review and revised its community guidelines regarding historical profile pictures.

In November 2026, Pikmin 4: Nintendo Switch 2 Edition + Dandori Academy was review-bombed on Metacritic due to factors such as slower load times, frame rate still being capped at 30 fps, and reused content, with many claiming it to be a downgrade from the original. This dropped the game's user score to 1.8, indicating "overwhelming dislike", making it the lowest-rated Nintendo Switch 2 game on the platform.

Grand Theft Auto VI was review bombed on Metacritic, stabilising at around 5.6/10 by November 21, which was seemingly the result of review bombing, including politically charged reviews and from players who admit they "haven't even played the game" themselves; the day after release saw a user Metacritic score as low as 3.7/10, before it rose to 5.0/10. At the same time, the 2026 remake of The Legend of Zelda: Ocarina of Time, the highest user-rated game on Metacritic of 2026, was also review bombed after allegations of coordinated review bombing on Grand Theft Auto VI by Nintendo fans, dropping the user score from a 9.6/10 to a 8.9/10.

== Film and television ==
=== Film ===
The 2014 Indian film Gunday suffered from review bombing by Bangladeshis on IMDb due to a historical inaccuracy regarding the creation of Bangladesh in the film's opening narration. At the time of release, it was the lowest-rated film on the site, with a 1.4/10 rating based on more than 44,000 votes, of which 91% gave one star.

The 2014 movie Saving Christmas was subject to review bombing after producer and star Kirk Cameron responded to the negative reviews by posting on his Facebook page. He wrote, "Help me storm the gates of Rotten Tomatoes. All of you who love Saving Christmas – go rate it at Rotten Tomatoes right now and send the message to all the critics that WE decide what movies we want our families to see." The attempt backfired, causing Internet users to visit the Rotten Tomatoes website and further condemn the film. Three weeks after the film's release, the film gained additional notoriety when it became the lowest-rated film on IMDb's bottom 100 list. Cameron later responded to the low rating, saying that it was due to a campaign on Reddit by "haters and atheists" to purposely lower the film's ratings.

The 2016 Ghostbusters film was met with user backlash on its announcement of having an all-female starring cast (unlike previous films that had an all-male starring cast). The 2019 Marvel Studios film Captain Marvel also faced drastically lower review scores at release (with over 50,000 mostly negative reviews within several hours of release), as offense was taken to leading actress Brie Larson's perceived activism.

The 2016 historical drama The Promise, about the Armenian genocide, was review-bombed on the Internet Movie Database prior to release. Commentators assessed that these were mostly votes by people who could not possibly have seen the film, and that the one-star voting was part of an orchestrated campaign by Armenian Genocide deniers to downrate it, which then initiated an Armenian response to rate the film highly.

The second installment in the Star Wars sequel trilogy, The Last Jedi, was met with many negative audience reviews on Rotten Tomatoes, in contrast to sites like CinemaScore which polled audiences in person who gave a positive "A" grade. Publications had suspicions about the authenticity of the audience scores; Polygon wrote how it was difficult to discern how many were genuine reviews and how many were bots or organized attacks, finding that many criticized the film's inclusion of "SJW" concepts or for its racial diversity and female figures.

The 2021 film Music, directed by musician Sia, was review bombed following controversy around the casting of non-autistic actress Maddie Ziegler as an autistic girl, as well as for scenes involving potentially dangerous restraints.

Disney's 2023 live-action remake of The Little Mermaid was review bombed during the film's opening weekend, mainly targeting the casting of African American actress and singer Halle Bailey as Ariel. This resulted in IMDb and AlloCiné adding warnings to their rating pages for the film, with the former's reading "Our rating mechanism has detected unusual voting activity on this title. To preserve the reliability of our rating system, an alternate weighting calculation has been applied."

In 2025, another Disney live-action remake, Snow White, was review bombed on IMDb with hundreds of thousands of one-star votes — the 284,000 votes were as much as the 2019 remake of The Lion King had gotten in its lifetime — that brought its overall grade to 1.5 out of 10, which would make it the lowest-ranked movie ever before the website disconsidered the grade for unusual voting activity. One of the major reasons the movie was targeted is due to backlash, primarily amongst right-leaning fans, over Snow White portrayer Rachel Zegler's critique of the original 1937 animated film. In addition, some other criticisms center around political positions regarding the Gaza war, as Zegler has spoken in defense of Palestine and Evil Queen actress Gal Gadot is Israeli.

In January 2026, Mother Jones reported that Melania, a documentary about First Lady Melania Trump, was review bombed on Letterboxd before its release. On January 27, all of the reviews were removed, which Letterboxd attributed to correcting an incorrect release date pulled from another movie database. By January 29, the day before the film's scheduled release, Letterboxd users had review-bombed the film again. The Daily Beast reported that many Letterboxd reviewers openly admitted that they had not seen the film and did not intend to, and seemed to be motivated by animus towards the second presidency of Donald Trump or director Brett Ratner, due to the latter's history of sexual assault allegations and his relationship with Jeffrey Epstein.

=== Television ===
Batwoman was review-bombed for portraying the title character as a lesbian. HBO's Watchmen, based on the graphic novel Watchmen, was review bombed by fans of the comic that felt the series disrespected the character of Rorschach, who they felt was meant to be the hero instead of a right-wing figure as illustrated by the original graphic novel and throughout the series, although The Mary Sue noted that the graphic novel had portrayed his character as such.

The Bluey episode, "Sleepytime", held the position as the second-highest-rated episode on IMDb in August 2022 behind the Breaking Bad episode "Ozymandias" for a brief period of time with a perfect 10/10 rating, tying it with "Ozymandias". However, the episode then dropped to a 9.9 rating soon after executive producer Daley Pearson congratulated the episode's position on IMDb on Twitter. Soon after, several anime episodes, particularly from Attack on Titan and Code Geass, started ranking higher on the platform. It has been speculated that the fans of these anime series review-bombed "Sleepytime" so they would have a higher ranking on the platform than Bluey.

When it debuted in early September 2022, the television series The Lord of the Rings: The Rings of Power was review-bombed on Amazon Prime and Rotten Tomatoes in response to its diverse cast, resulting in an audience score of 33%.

In 2023, The Last of Us, the television adaptation of the video game The Last of Us, was review-bombed after the airing of the third episode, "Long, Long Time" which centered on a gay relationship between two characters.

The Star Wars show The Acolyte, which before release had suffered criticism for its diverse cast and queer showrunner, was review-bombed upon its 2024 debut on Disney+. The campaign even targeted a 2022 Star Wars fan film called The Acolyte and the unrelated 2008 film Acolytes.

In 2025, even before release the Marvel miniseries Ironheart was review-bombed for centering around a Black woman, Riri Williams.

In December 2025, Chapter Seven: The Bridge the penultimate episode of the final season of Stranger Things was review-bombed, with articles believing this was largely due to a scene featuring long-running character Will Byers coming out as gay.

In February 2026, "In the Name of the Mother", a critically acclaimed episode of the first season of the American fantasy drama television series A Knight of the Seven Kingdoms, was review-bombed by fans of the crime drama television series Breaking Bad, with the intent to prevent the episode from reaching an aggregate 10/10 rating on IMDb to preserve the status of the Breaking Bad episode "Ozymandias" as the only episode on IMDb with an aggregate 10/10 rating. Subsequently, in what has been described as a "review-bombing war", viewers of A Knight of the Seven Kingdoms began review-bombing Ozymandias in retaliation, with the intent to bring down the episode's rating on IMDb, eventually bringing down the rating to a score of 9.5 and removing the episode's 10/10 rating for the first time in 13 years.

== Apps ==
On April 8, 2020, the Google Classroom app was review-bombed in the Google Play Store and the App Store because students did not want to work during the COVID-19 pandemic. A common claim was that if the app had enough low-rating reviews, it would be taken down.

In May 2020, the TikTok app at Google Play Store in India was review-bombed by fans of a YouTube content creator CarryMinati, who had criticised a TikTok user, making the app's rating of 4.5 stars decrease to 1.2 stars between May 16 and May 21. Several right-wing activists also took the opportunity to participate in the review bombing. A large number of one-star reviews were posted, many of them by accounts which were later determined to be fake. A few days after the incident, Google Play Store removed over five million of the 1-star reviews, categorising them as "spam abuse".

On July 9, 2020, the app for Donald Trump for the App Store was review bombed due to Trump's threat to ban TikTok.

On January 28, 2021, American investment and trading app Robinhood was review-bombed on the Google Play Store following the company's restriction of buying certain stocks. The app's rating went down from 4-stars to 1-star after it received over 100,000 negative reviews. The trading restriction followed an effort by the users of the subreddit r/wallstreetbets to drive up the price of those stocks during the GameStop Short Squeeze.

On February 9, 2021, ZXing Barcode Scanner was review-bombed on Google Play, who mistook it for another forked barcode scanner app that added malware in a recent update that had been discovered by MalwareBytes. The review bombing occurred after Google removed the infected app from the Play Store. The original ZXing app had not been updated since February 2019.

== Books ==
In 2023, fantasy author Cait Corrain created multiple accounts on GoodReads to review bomb books by other fantasy authors, so that their upcoming book would be favored by the platform.
