= Peter Pan (franchise) =

Disney media franchise based on Peter Pan book and play by J. M. Barrie

Disney's Peter Pan
- Created by: Walt Disney
- Original work: Peter Pan (1953)
- Owner: The Walt Disney Company
- Based on: Peter and Wendy by J. M. Barrie

Films and television
- Films: Peter Pan (1953); Return to Never Land (2002); Tinker Bell (film series; 2008–2015)^{**}; Peter Pan & Wendy (2023)
- Television series: Once Upon a Time (2011–2018)^{*}
- Animated series: Jake and the Never Land Pirates (2011–2016)

Games
- Traditional: Walt Disney's Peter Pan: A Game of Adventure
- Video games: Disney's Villains' Revenge (1999)^{*}; Peter Pan: Adventures in Never Land (2002); Peter Pan: The Legend of Never Land (2005); Kingdom Hearts (2002)^{*}; Kingdom Hearts: Chain of Memories (2004)^{*}; Kingdom Hearts: 358/2 Days (2009)^{*}; Kingdom Hearts Birth by Sleep (2010)^{*}; Epic Mickey (2010)^{*}; Kinect: Disneyland Adventures (2011)^{*}; Epic Mickey: Power of Illusion (2012)^{*}; Disney Infinity 2.0 (2014)^{*}; Disney Magic Kingdoms (2016)^{*}; Disney Mirrorverse (2022)^{*}; Disney Dreamlight Valley (2023)^{*}

Audio
- Original music: Disney Fairies: Faith, Trust, and Pixie Dust (2012)^{**}

Miscellaneous
- Theme park attractions: Peter Pan's Flight (1955–present); Fantasmic! (1992–present)^{*}; Pixie Hollow (2008–present); Following the Leader with Peter Pan (2012–present)
- Based on: Peter and Wendy (1904) by J. M. Barrie
- ^{*} Work where this franchise's characters or settings appeared as part of a crossover, or has characters based on those from this franchise.^{**} Also part of the Disney Fairies franchise

Peter Pan is a media franchise owned by The Walt Disney Company, based on J. M. Barrie's original 1904 play and 1911 novel, which officially commenced with the 1952 theatrical film Peter Pan.

The franchise is about Peter Pan, a boy who lives in Neverland and refuses to enter the human world and grow up. He takes Wendy Darling's family to his home and shows them around, and together they aim to foil the plan of the evil and vengeful Captain Hook.

The character Tinker Bell is also part of the Disney Fairies franchise.

== Films ==
Film	U.S release date	Director(s)	Screenwriter(s)	Story by	Producers
Animated
Peter Pan	February 5, 1953	Hamilton Luske, Clyde Geronimi and Wilfred Jackson	Ted Sears, Erdman Penner, Bill Peet, Winston Hibler, Joe Rinaldi, Milt Banta, Ralph Wright and Bill Cottrell		Walt Disney
Return to Never Land	February 15, 2002	Robin Budd	Temple Mathews	Temple Mathews	Christopher Chase, Michelle Pappalardo-Robinson and Dan Rounds
Live-action
Peter Pan & Wendy	April 28, 2023	David Lowery	David Lowery and Toby Halbrooks	David Lowery and Toby Halbrooks	Jim Whitaker

=== Main animated feature films ===
==== Peter Pan (1953) ====
Peter Pan is a 1953 theatrical film based on the play Peter Pan; or, the Boy Who Wouldn't Grow Up by J. M. Barrie.

==== Peter Pan: Return to Never Land (2002) ====
Return to Never Land, also known as Peter Pan: Return to Never Land, is a 2002 theatrical film which serves as a sequel to the 1953 film.

=== Tinker Bell spin-off film series ===
The Tinker Bell film series consists of six films, one half-hour special, and one six-minute short, and is based around the character Tinker Bell, serving as both a spin-off and prequel film series to Peter Pan.

=== Peter Pan & Wendy (2023) ===
Peter Pan & Wendy is a live action adaptation of Peter Pan, directed by David Lowery, with a script he co-wrote with Toby Halbrooks and Joe Roth and Jim Whitaker serve as producers. Alexander Molony and Ever Anderson stars as Peter Pan and Wendy, respectively; while Jude Law, Yara Shahidi, Alyssa Wapanatâhk and Jim Gaffigan portrayed Captain Hook, Tinker Bell, Tiger Lily and Mr. Smee. The film was released on Disney+ in 2023.

== Theme park attractions ==
=== Peter Pan's Flight ===
Peter Pan's Flight is a ride located in Fantasyland at Disneyland, Walt Disney World, Disneyland Paris, Tokyo Disneyland and Shanghai Disneyland.

=== Pixie Hollow ===
Pixie Hollow is a character meet-and-greet located in Fantasyland at Disneyland, and features characters from the Tinker Bell film series.

=== Back to Neverland ===
Back to Neverland is a short film shown inside The Magic of Disney Animation at Disney's Hollywood Studios, and Disney Animation at Disney California Adventure.

=== Fantasmic! ===
The Peter Pan main characters are featured in a scene in the nighttime show Fantasmic!

=== Meet and greets ===
Peter Pan, Wendy, Tinker Bell, Captain Hook and Mr. Smee all appear as meetable characters at the Disney Parks and Resorts, and usually alternate between Fantasyland and Adventureland.

== Video games ==
=== Peter Pan: Adventures in Never Land ===
Peter Pan: Adventures in Never Land (also known as Peter Pan in Return to Never Land in North America) is a 2002 action game developed by Doki Denki and published by Sony Computer Entertainment for the PlayStation. Disney Interactive released the game on Windows. It was released as a tie-in to Return to Never Land. An abridged version for the Game Boy Advance developed by Crawfish Interactive was released the same year.

=== Peter Pan: The Legend of Never Land ===
Peter Pan: The Legend of Never Land is a 2005 PlayStation 2 video game developed by British studio Blue52 and published by Sony Computer Entertainment, exclusively in European territories. Based on the 1953 film and the sequel Return to Never Land, the plot follows Captain Hook discovering the island's magical secret and plots to rid Never Land of its enchanting Pixie dust. It was the first game to be developed by Blue52, a predecessor to publisher Curve Games.

=== Kingdom Hearts series ===
Neverland appears as a playable world in installments in Disney and Square Enix's Kingdom Hearts series, appearing in the titles Kingdom Hearts, Kingdom Hearts: Chain of Memories, Kingdom Hearts 358/2 Days, and Kingdom Hearts Birth by Sleep, in addition of several characters of Peter Pan. Peter Pan also appears (along with Tinker Bell) in Kingdom Hearts II as a summon character.

=== Disney Infinity ===
Peter Pan was referenced in the Disney Infinity series though power discs and in-game toys. Tinker Bell was added as a playable character starting in the second game, Disney Infinity 2.0, although she was primarily based on her Disney Fairies appearances. Nevertheless, the "Disney's Treasure Hunt" intro to the game included a segment based on the 1953 film where the player flies through London as Tinker Bell.

Peter Pan was planned to be added to the series via an update for Disney Infinity 3.0 after being chosen by "Toy Box Artists" at the 2015 Disney Infinity Toy Box Summit, but further development for the series was cancelled in May 2016, with the Peter Pan figure having never seen release.

=== Disney Magic Kingdoms ===
Tinker Bell, Peter Pan, Wendy, John, Michael and Captain Hook appear as playable characters in Disney Magic Kingdoms. While most focus on their versions of Peter Pan, Tinker Bell's version focuses on her version of the Tinker Bell film series. Some attractions based on the franchise also appear in the game, including Pixie Hollow, Peter Pan's Flight, Lost Boys' Hideout, and The Jolly Roger (this last featuring Tick-Tock the Crocodile as a non-player character).

== Television series ==
=== Once Upon a Time ===
Alternate versions of the characters appeared in the Disney-inspired show Once Upon a Time. The episode "Second Star to the Right" centers around these characters as well as the first half of the shows third season taking place primarily in Neverland. The show also reverses the roles of Peter Pan and Captain Hook in which Pan is the antagonist and Hook is a protagonist. This variation is exclusive to the series. Although not directly based on the Disney film, but primarily on the original tale, it does include some elements inspired by the Disney version, including the appearance of Silvermist from the Disney Fairies franchise in the spin-off series Once Upon a Time in Wonderland.

=== Jake and the Never Land Pirates ===
Jake and the Never Land Pirates is a spin-off television series based on Disney's Peter Pan franchise. Further spin-offs of this show include: Playing With Skully, Jake's Never Land Pirate School, Mama Hook Knows Best!, and Jake's Buccaneer Blast.

== Tabletop games ==
=== Walt Disney's Peter Pan: A Game of Adventure ===
Walt Disney's Peter Pan: A Game of Adventure is a board game based on the 1953 film, created by Transogram Company.

== Music ==
=== Disney Fairies: Faith, Trust, and Pixie Dust ===
Disney Fairies: Faith, Trust, and Pixie Dust is a compilation album with songs from the Tinker Bell film series.

=== Songs ===
- "The Second Star to the Right"
- "You Can Fly"
- "A Pirate's Life (Is a Wonderful Life)"
- "Never Smile at a Crocodile"
- "Following the Leader"
- "What Made the Red Man Red?"

== Theatre and stage ==
=== Disney on Ice ===
Disney on Ice began a touring production of Peter Pan in 1999.may

== Cast and characters ==
List indicators

This section includes characters who will appear or have appeared in more than two films in the series.

- An empty grey cell indicates the character was not in the film, or that the character's official presence has not yet been confirmed.
- ^{O} indicates an older version of the character.
- ^{U} indicates an uncredited appearance.
- ^{Y} indicates a younger version of the character.

Characters	Animated films		Short film	Video game	Television series				Live-action film
Characters	Peter Pan	Return to Never Land	Back to Never Land	Peter Pan: Adventures in Never Land	Jake and the Never Land Pirates				Peter Pan & Wendy
Characters	Peter Pan	Return to Never Land	Back to Never Land	Peter Pan: Adventures in Never Land	Season 1	Season 2	Season 3	Season 4	Peter Pan & Wendy
Peter Pan	Bobby Driscoll	Blayne Weaver		Blayne Weaver	Adam Wylie	Adam Wylie	Adam Wylie	Adam Wylie	Alexander Molony
Wendy Darling	Kathryn Beaumont	Kath Soucie					Maia Mitchell		Ever Anderson
Wendy Darling	Kathryn Beaumont	Kath Soucie					Maia Mitchell		Cassie Von Wolde^{O}
Wendy Darling	Kathryn Beaumont	Harriet Owen^{Y}					Maia Mitchell		Deborah Ramsey^{O}
Tinker Bell	Character is mute	Character is mute	Character is mute	Character is mute		Mae Whitman^{U}			Yara Shahidi
Captain James Hook	Hans Conried	Corey Burton	Corey Burton	Corey Burton	Corey Burton	Corey Burton	Corey Burton	Corey Burton	Jude Law
Mr. Smee	Bill Thompson	Jeff Bennett		Jeff Bennett	Jeff Bennett	Jeff Bennett	Jeff Bennett	Jeff Bennett	Jim Gaffigan
John Darling	Paul Collins	Silhouette					Elliot Reeve		Joshua Pickering
Michael Darling	Tommy Luske	Silhouette					Colby Mulgrew		Jacobi Jupe
Slightly	Stuffy Singer^{U}	Quinn Beswick							Noah Matthews Matofsky
Cubby	Robert Ellis^{U}	Spencer Breslin							Florence Bensberg
Nibs	Jeffrey Silver^{U}	Bradley Pierce							Sebastian Billingsley-Rodriguez
Twins	Johnny McGovern^{U}	Aaron Spann		Aron Spann					Skyler and Kelsey Yates
Tootles	Character is mute	Character is mute							Caelan Edie
Tick-Tock	Character is mute	Silhouette	Character is mute	Character is mute	Dee Bradley Baker	Dee Bradley Baker	Dee Bradley Baker	Dee Bradley Baker	Character is mute
Indian Chief	Candy Candido			Corey Burton					
Princess Tiger Lily	Character is mute			Melissa Disney					Alyssa Wapanatâhk
Mary Darling	Heather Angel								Molly Parker
George Darling	Hans Conried								Alan Tudyk
Mermaids	June Foray^{U}	Characters are mute		Melissa Disney					Gemita Samarra
Mermaids	Connie Hilton^{U}	Characters are mute		Melissa Disney					Gemita Samarra
Mermaids	Karen Kester^{U}	Characters are mute		Megan Parlen					Liise Keeling
Mermaids	Margaret Kerry^{U}	Characters are mute		Megan Parlen					Ivett Gonda
Jane		Harriet Owen							
Octopus		Frank Welker			Dee Bradley Baker	Dee Bradley Baker	Dee Bradley Baker		
Daniel		Andrew McDonough							
Edward		Roger Rees							
Robin Williams			Himself						
Walter Cronkite			Himself						
