= Spectrobes: Beyond the Portals =

2008 video game

- North American box art
- Developer: Jupiter
- Publisher: Disney Interactive Studios
- Director: Tetsuro Hosokawa
- Producer: Kentaro Hisai
- Designer: Aguru Tanaka
- Programmer: Hiroshi Takemoto
- Artist: Kouji Kiriyama
- Writer: Akira Matsumoto
- Composer: Masahiko Kimura
- Series: Spectrobes
- Platform: Nintendo DS
- Release: NA: October 7, 2008; AU: November 27, 2008; JP: December 11, 2008; EU: February 27, 2009
- Genre: Action role-playing
- Modes: Single-player, multiplayer

Spectrobes: Beyond the Portals, known in Japan as Spectrobes Series: Super-Fossil Monster Battle - Crash Galaxy (Note: Japanese: スペクトロブスシリーズ 超化石モンスターバトル ゲキトツ・ギャラクシー, Hepburn: Supekutorobusu Shiriizu Chōkaseki Monsutaa Batoru Gekitotsu Gyarakushii), is an action role-playing video game developed by Jupiter and published by Disney Interactive Studios for the Nintendo DS. Spectrobes: Beyond The Portals is the sequel to the best-selling video game, Spectrobes. The sequel was released on October 7, 2008 in North America, November 27 in Australia, December 11 in Japan and February 27, 2009 in Europe. A sequel called Spectrobes: Origins was released on the Wii in 2009.

== Plot ==
After the recent defense of the Nanairo system from the Krawl swarm, Rallen, a young and hardheaded planetary police officer, and Jeena, his sensible and technologically adept partner, enjoy several months of peace. However their peace is disrupted when their friend Aldous, a mysterious man from a distant star system, is kidnapped by a Krawl superior known as Maja, one of the High Krawl. Even worse, a series of mysterious portals are opening up around the Nanairo system allowing Rallen and Jeena access to different star systems - and the Krawl access to the Nanairo system. Now, with the help of brand new Spectrobes and a vicious breed of Dark Spectrobes, Rallen and Jeena must venture across the universe to rescue Aldous and defeat the four High Krawl.

== Gameplay ==
Gameplay in Beyond the Portals functions similarly to that of its predecessor. Players predominantly control Rallen in the field, although from time to time, they will be able to control Jeena to solve puzzles. Five planets of the Nanairo Star System, from the first game are accessible once more. At certain points in the game, portals will open that will allow the player to travel to different star systems. There are a total of ten planets and three portals spread out over four star systems. During normal gameplay, the player is given the option to play a mini-game, flying the Patrol Cruiser, whilst dodging asteroids, in order to travel through a portal that links to another star system.

=== Ship Parts ===
At the Service Bay orbiting the planet Kollin, the player may speak to an Engineer on board to either make or attach Ship Parts. These ship parts are made up of 3 Rare Minerals, Titanium, which takes on the appearance of a stack of metal sheets, Metalium, which takes on the appearance of a Meteorite with pulsing lines strung across it, and Marble, which takes on the form of a pale blue ellipse shape. Apart from aesthetic changes, these parts also modify ship stats in the Portal mini-game. The starting ship is automatically Equipped with "Jet" parts in all 3 areas.

=== Field Battles ===
Rallen fights field Battles with "Krawl Dust" outside of Krawl vortexes. Rallen can use the sword and blaster to attack Krawl Dust and the glove to stun them. Each successful kill gives Rallen some experience points, and after a certain amount of experience, his rank will increase, allowing him access to more powerful equipment. Krawl Dust is spawned from Large Vortexes.

=== Encounter Battles ===
Encounter Battles are fought inside Krawl vortexes. Encounter Battles may be initiated by walking into a vortex. Once inside the vortex, the player controls the first of two offensive Spectrobes while the second is controlled by the computer. The player may switch between the two Spectrobes at any time. In order to win the battle, all of the opposing Krawl must be destroyed. Spectrobes can use a variety of attacks to fight, the most basic of which is a standard attack. The CH Gauge also makes a return from the original Spectrobes. With each successful hit, the CH Gauge fills, and when it fills to a certain point, special, more powerful attacks may be executed. Like the Spectrobes, all Krawl have an attribute of Corona, Flash, or Aurora, and their type will determine their strengths and their weaknesses. Once the battle is done, remaining Spectrobes receive a certain amount of Minergy (a contraction of Mineral Energy), and the player receives some Gura (the currency of the game) and on occasion, an item, and on a very rare occasion, a mineral.

=== Excavation ===
Excavation also makes a return from the original title. Players may use a variety of tools to retrieve either a fossil, a mineral, a cube, or a mystery stone from the ground. Sometimes, players may find an invisible hexagon shaped door that allows them to enter a secret map area provided they have the correct Child Spectrobe type (Corona, Aurora, or Flash) accompanying them. In certain areas, special tools may have to be used to get past the terrain; for example, a flame thrower for ice, a water nozzle for lava, etc. Each of these drills must be used meticulously and with precision to master excavation.

=== Spectrobes ===
In addition to the 73 original Spectrobes from the previous title, Beyond the Portals boasts 112 new Spectrobes. It also introduces a new variety of Spectrobes: "Dark Spectrobes". These Spectrobes are already existing Spectrobes afflicted with dark influence from Krawl, and are much more powerful than their normal counterparts. They boast alternate darker color schemes, featuring primarily black with colored highlights.

=== Geos ===
Unlockable devices which contain "Ultimate Spectrobes" which are not obtainable by normal means. Each Geo has the effect of destroying all the Krawl on the battlefield through a unique cut scene with each Ultimate Spectrobe. Once a Geo is equipped it will replace the effect of the CH Gauge.

== Wi-Fi connectivity ==
In addition the original Upload/Download features from the original Spectrobes, Beyond the Portals introduces the Wi-Fi Battle and Wi-Fi Market features. As the original title was criticized for its lack of substantial Wi-Fi multiplayer features, Beyond the Portals features the ability to battle Spectrobes over Wi-Fi. There are options to battle with either strangers or friends. In the latter case, one needs to register the friend code of another in their roster, like in other Nintendo Wi-Fi games. Beyond the Portals also features a Wi-Fi Market, which allows players to buy and sell their Spectrobes with set prices.

=== DGamer ===
Spectrobes: Beyond the Portals is one of the first Disney Interactive Studios titles compatible with DGamer, an online community service. Certain achievements obtained in-game were carried over to a player's DGamer account, which could unlock secret costume items that a player used to customize their avatar.

== Reception ==
Reception

Aggregate score
Aggregator	Score
Metacritic	70/100

Review scores
Publication	Score
Destructoid	6/10
GameSpot	5/10
GamesRadar+	3.5/5
GameZone	8/10
IGN	8/10
Nintendo Power	8/10
Nintendo World Report	6/10
PALGN	6/10
411Mania	8/10
Variety	(favorable)

Spectrobes: Beyond the Portals received "average" reviews, a bit more positive than the original Spectrobes, according to the review aggregation website Metacritic. A major flaw noted was the lack of viable camera control. However, the improvement of the battle system was well-received, as well as the game's graphics. Critics enjoyed the return of excavating, and although they found the battle system improved they still found it repetitive.
