= Kinect: Disneyland Adventures =

2011 video game

- PAL region cover art
- Developers: Frontier Developments; Asobo Studio (remaster)
- Publisher: Microsoft Studios
- Composers: Mark Griskey; Wataru Hokoyama; Laura Karpman; Paul Lipson; Peter McConnell; Lennie Moore
- Platforms: Xbox 360 (with Kinect); Xbox One; Microsoft Windows
- Release: November 15, 2011: Xbox 360; NA: November 15, 2011; AU: November 17, 2011; EU: November 18, 2011; JP: December 8, 2011; Xbox One; WW: October 31, 2017; Microsoft Windows; Microsoft Store; WW: October 31, 2017; Steam, retail; WW: September 14, 2018
- Genre: Open world
- Modes: Single-player, multiplayer

Kinect: Disneyland Adventures is a 2011 open world video game developed by Frontier Developments and published by Microsoft Studios on Kinect for Xbox 360, with a remaster for Xbox One and Microsoft Windows developed by Asobo Studio released in 2017 as simply Disneyland Adventures. It takes place in a recreation of Disneyland Park in Anaheim, California, circa 2011, with themed games in place of many of the rides, while motion controls are used (required in the original release) to play the game.

In addition to minigames based on various Disneyland attractions, the game allows players to take photos of their avatars at the park, and meet and greet characters. The characters appear in their normal proportions, as if animated, as opposed to appearing as a costumed character. Outdoors at the park are characters including Mickey Mouse, Minnie Mouse, Donald Duck, Daisy Duck, Goofy, Pluto and Chip 'n' Dale. Other Disney characters appear within the minigames, such as Tinker Bell from Peter Pan as she appears in the Disney Fairies franchise and Nemo from Finding Nemo.

Microsoft later published a remastered version of the game for Xbox One and Windows 10 developed by Asobo Studio with updated visuals, 4K resolution, support for the Xbox One's Kinect sensor, and the ability to play the game with traditional controls using an Xbox Wireless Controller or (on Windows only) a mouse and keyboard. The new version was released on October 31, 2017, as Disneyland Adventures, removing the Kinect branding from the title. The Windows version was released for Steam and retail discs in September 2018, adding support for Windows 7, Windows 8, and Windows 8.1 along with Windows 10.

== Gameplay ==
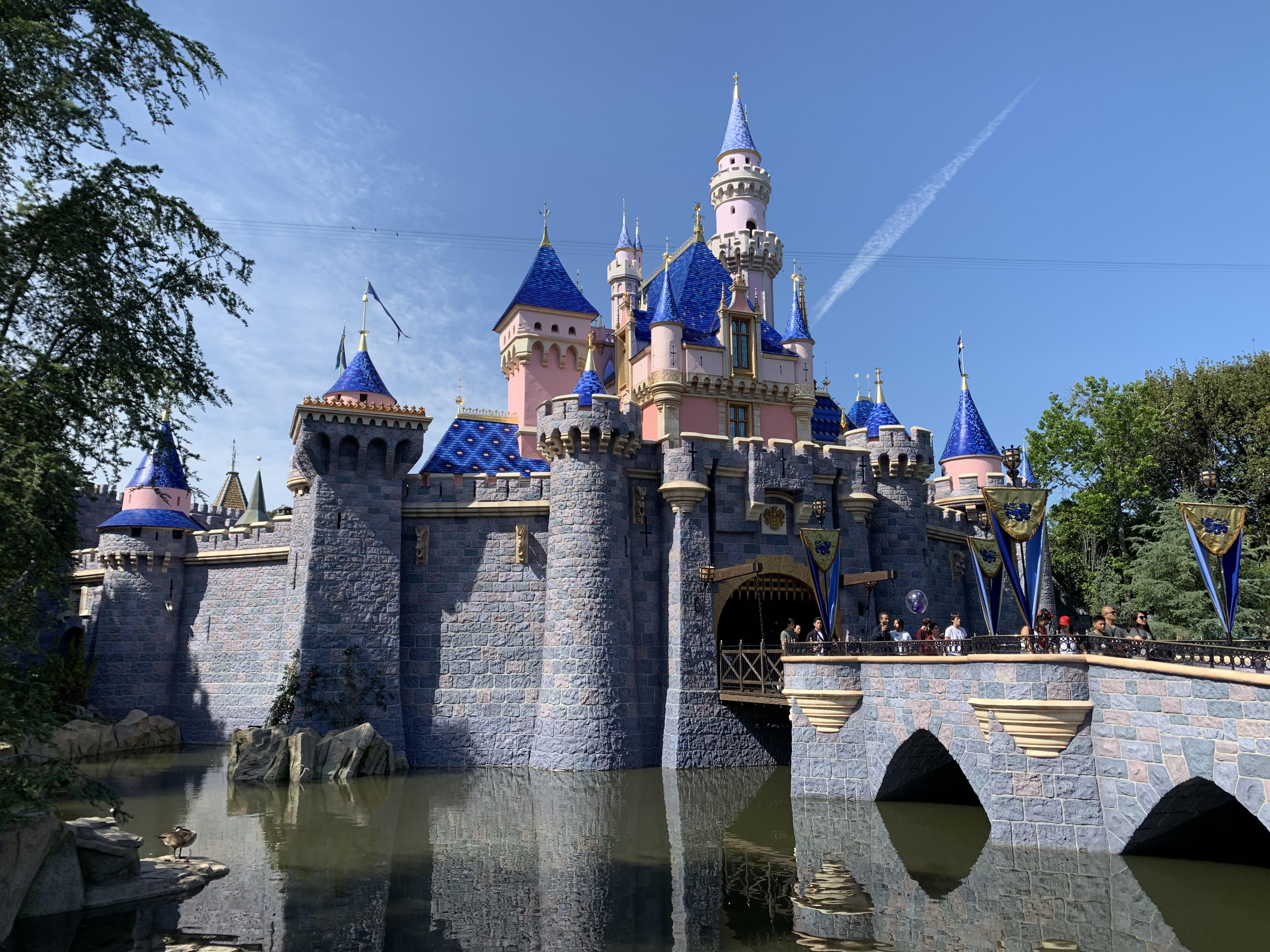
Comparison between the Sleeping Beauty Castle in Kinect: Disneyland Adventures and the one it was based on in Fantasyland. The game's open world is largely based on a recreation of Disneyland Park in Anaheim circa 2011, albeit with certain attractions altered due to licensing issues.

Gameplay is a combination of minigames and open world play style. Players perform objectives and tasks for characters to gain Disney currency. It features drop-in, drop-out cooperative play for two players. Players play as a customizable child guest to the park, who gets help from a magic, anthropomorphic golden ticket. The game is controlled using the Kinect sensor's motion-sensing and speech recognition capabilities, with the 2017 remaster using an Xbox Wireless Controller or a mouse and keyboard as options.

With the Kinect, player navigation in the park is performed by raising one arm out in front of the (leading) player and shifting the raised arm left or right to turn. When the (leading) player receives items from a character (which include a digital camera from Mickey Mouse, a magic wand from Cinderella, a laser blaster from Buzz Lightyear, a fishing rod from Stinky Pete, a megaphone from Br'er Fox, a magic spyglass from Aladdin, and a water squirter from Donald Duck), the (leading) player can raise one arm in the air to bring up an item selection menu and bring the arm down to make a selection. After selecting an item, the (leading) player uses the arm with the item on hand to use said item and their free arm to navigate the park.

Players can talk to the characters, enter attractions, or enter gift shops by walking up to them until a gold circle appears on the ground around the character, Disneyland sign (for rideable classic rides), magic portal (for rides featuring minigames), or store greeter (for shops), then either wave or say, "Hi there!" When talking to any of the characters (except for a park guide character named Karen, who provides trivia about Disneyland), they may give a task (usually a fetch quest) that players must do by either navigating the park or playing the minigame attractions. Players can also hug, high five (or shake hands depending on the character), dance, receive autographs from, or take photos with the characters, again via motion gestures or voice prompts (e.g. to dance, players can either bow over or say, "Shall we dance?" to trigger a dancing cutscene with the character). However, autographs can only be signed if players have the corresponding autograph books, and photographs can only be taken once players receive the camera item and the corresponding snapshot photo albums. In addition, the New Orleans Square character Fortune Red—a fortune teller machine—can only give or help players with tasks, or take a photograph with them. In addition to characters, attractions and shops, players can find spots to conduct music with park bands and Audio-Animatronics, but only after receiving a baton from Naveen.

The game's representation of the park contains numerous secrets for players to discover. Among other secrets, players could use their items to find trash cans, manhole covers, lights, plants, and Hidden Mickeys. Licensed attractions such as Star Tours – The Adventures Continue and Indiana Jones Adventure do not appear and have their facades stripped of any overt references to their namesake franchises, as the two franchises were owned by Lucasfilm at the time. Disney later acquired both the Star Wars and Indiana Jones franchises through its purchase of Lucasfilm in 2012. (Note: Indiana Jones Adventure's main safety warning sign at the entrance to the ride's queue area was fully restored in the 2017 remaster with the franchise referenced, although Star Tours's facade remains edited.) Roger Rabbit's Car Toon Spin and Tarzan's Treehouse are also omitted, as Roger Rabbit is co-owned by Disney and Steven Spielberg's Amblin Entertainment, while Tarzan remains the property of Edgar Rice Burroughs' estate. Among the meetable characters themselves, Black Barty serves as an in-game replacement for Captain Jack Sparrow from the Pirates of the Caribbean franchise, appearing in New Orleans Square and in the minigames based on the attraction. In addition, all mentions of corporate sponsors (such as Dole, whose Dole Whip is sold at Adventureland) are omitted.

== Reception ==
Reception

Aggregate scores
Aggregator	Score
GameRankings	71.77% (X360); 64.29% (XONE)
Metacritic	73/100 (X360); 67/100 (XONE)

Kinect: Disneyland Adventures received an average score of 71.77% at GameRankings, based on an aggregate of 22 reviews, and an average of 73/100 at Metacritic, based on an aggregate of 33 reviews. The Xbox One Disneyland Adventures remaster received an average of 64.29% on GameRankings, based on an aggregate of 7 reviews, and an average of 67/100 on Metacritic, based on an aggregate of 9 reviews, with the remaster criticized for a number of technical issues and introducing no new content from the original release besides the additional control schemes and improved graphics. During the 15th Annual Interactive Achievement Awards, the Academy of Interactive Arts & Sciences nominated Disneyland Adventures for "Family Game of the Year".

== See also ==
- List of Disney video games
