= Mickey's Stickers & Stuff Printing Fun Kit =

- Developer: Disney Interactive
- Release: 1997
- Operating system: Windows

Mickey's Stickers & Stuff Printing Fun Kit is a software CD-ROM developed by Disney Interactive and Avery Dennison. It was released in October 1997.

== Summary ==
Mickey's Stickers & Stuff Printing Fun Kit features Mickey Mouse and his friends, incorporating fun, colorful patterns, and wacky art elements. Users can create their own customized designs, layouts, and text. The program contains more than 250 images of Mickey and Minnie Mouse, Donald and Daisy Duck, Goofy and Pluto; various backgrounds; patterns, and a selection of typefaces.

== Reception ==
Kids Domain said "It's a great project for keeping your kids occupied and busy during this holiday season". Public Opinion said "If your children like Disney characters&stickers, they will have a lot of fun with Mickey's Stickers & Stuff Printing Fun Kit".

MicroTimes called the program ideal for art projects, birthdays, holidays, or any occasion.
