= That's So Raven: Psychic on the Scene =

2006 video game

- Developer: Handheld Games
- Publisher: Buena Vista Games (Note: Released under the Disney brand.)
- Platform: Nintendo DS
- Release: NA: November 2, 2006
- Genre: Adventure
- Mode: Single-player

That's So Raven: Psychic on the Scene is a point-and-click video game based on Disney's That's So Raven television series. In the video game, Raven has to stop the Thompson Theater from closing.

== Gameplay ==
As Raven, the player explores through several locations from the television series while collecting items and talking to characters from the show. The only way for the player to get inside certain areas is by making Raven change into a disguise. There is a fashion area of the game where the player can change how Raven looks in a variety of ways. The game also contains several mini-games.

== Reception ==
Lucas M. Thomas of IGN said that "most games like this deserve ridicule, but that this one doesn't because the fans will like it". Common Sense Media said that the game is well-designed and that it has high entertainment value, but that the game might be too easy for some kids. Matt Paddock of Game Vortex said that the only flaw is the "bad grammar and negative-talk."
