= Cory in the House (video game) =

2008 video game

- North American box art
- Developer: Handheld Games
- Publisher: Disney Interactive Studios
- Director: Jake Torset
- Producers: Daneen McDermott; Jerry Pritchard; Mary Schuyler
- Designers: Adam Butler; Tony Zharoff; Robert Kehoe; Christopher Smith
- Programmer: Jonah Hoskins
- Artist: Thomas Troisch
- Writer: Gerrin Tramis
- Composer: David Jaedyn Conley
- Platform: Nintendo DS
- Release: NA: April 22, 2008; PAL: 2008
- Genre: Adventure
- Mode: Single-player

Cory in the House is a 2008 adventure video game developed by Handheld Games and published by Disney Interactive Studios for the Nintendo DS. Based on the Disney Channel television series of the same name, its plot follows Cory Baxter and his friends as they attempt to thwart a toymaker's plans to hypnotize the population of Washington, D.C. using bobbleheads depicting the President of the United States. The player controls Cory through various locations to complete tasks such as exploring an area, playing a minigame, or talking to an NPC, in order to progress.

Upon release, the game was panned by critics; however, in 2015 and 2026 the game was review bombed with positive scores by users on Metacritic, stemming from an internet meme that satirically labeled its source show as an anime. In January 2026, Cory in the House was the second-highest user-rated game on Metacritic, surpassing Game of the Year 2025 winner Clair Obscur: Expedition 33 and causing online sales, as well as the price of the game, to surge.

== Gameplay and plot ==
Cory in the House is an adventure game with stealth elements based on the television show of the same name. It centers around Cory Baxter, a teenager who lives with his father Victor Baxter after Victor gets accepted as head chef at the White House. After winning the Wacky Wild Toy Contest, Cory starts an endeavor to sell bobbleheads depicting the President of the United States to the citizens of Washington, D.C. The bobbleheads are taken into possession by The Evil Toymaker, who tries to utilize them as a means to hypnotize the population of Washington, D.C. Cory is tasked with retrieving the bobbleheads to stop the hypnosis plan.

Cory Baxter in a room of the White House. The bottom screen currently shows the player's objective.

The player controls Cory and his friends as they move through locations including halls in the White House, a school, a mall, and the streets of Washington, D.C. Tasks involve sneaking past Secret Service agents, examining rooms for specific items, throwing pastries at hypnotized teachers, and talking to non-playable characters. Additional features include minigames like hacking and playing the drums, which involve tapping the Nintendo DS stylus against the touchscreen along with music or simulating connecting electrical circuits.

== Development and release ==
Cory in the House was developed by Handheld Games under the direction of Jake Torset, with Handheld's Daneen McDermott and Jerry Pritchard and Disney Interactive Studios' Mary Schuyler acting as producers. The game was designed by Adam Butler, Tony Zharoff, Robert Kehoe, and Christopher Smith. The script and dialogue were written by Gerrin Tramis. Jonah Hoskins served as the lead programmer, heading a team of David Johnson, Ken Scott, and Noah Hopson-Walker. Thomas Troisch was director of digital art. The music and sound effects were created by David Jaedyn Conley. The game was released in North America by Disney Interactive Studios on April 22, 2008.

== Reception ==
Reception

Aggregate score
Aggregator	Score
GameRankings	35%

Review score
Publication	Score
IGN	3/10

Cory in the House was critically panned, earning an overall score of 35% on aggregate review website GameRankings based on two reviews. IGN's Jack DeVries criticized the gameplay controls, calling them "clunky" and "hard to control", and found fault with the game's included laugh track that goes along with the dialogue sequence jokes. Trevor of Da Gameboyz gave Cory in the House a 40%, advising fans of the show to avoid playing the game.

The game received satirical review bombing on Metacritic in relation to an internet meme ironically describing the show as an "anime" series due to its absurd premise. In 2015, the game had an average user score of 9.5, making it one of the highest user-rated DS games on the site. In January 2026, the game was review bombed again to surpass Clair Obscur: Expedition 33, the then highest user-rated game on the platform and winner of the Game Award for Game of the Year in 2025. In January 2026, Cory in the House was the second-highest user-rated game on Metacritic, temporarily holding a 9.4 score. This resulted in a surge in sales on platforms like eBay and caused the value of the game to surge. Richard Warren of GameRant pointed out that the review bombing was part of the "Great Meme Reset" of 2026, in which internet memes from the 2010s, such as review bombing Cory in the House, were favored over more current ones.
