= Spectrobes: Origins =

2009 video game

- North American box art
- Developer(s): Genki
- Publisher(s): Disney Interactive Studios
- Director(s): Takayuki Sato
- Producer(s): Kentaro Hisai; Mizuki Horikoshi
- Designer(s): Shingo Nakata
- Programmer(s): Suguru Honda
- Artist(s): Takuya Kawai
- Writer(s): Kosuke Matsuo
- Composer(s): Masayoshi Ishi; Rei Kondoh; Toshiki Aida
- Series: Spectrobes
- Platform(s): Wii
- Release: NA: August 18, 2009; EU: September 18, 2009; AU: October 4, 2009; JP: June 17, 2010
- Genre(s): Action role-playing
- Mode(s): Single-player, multiplayer

Spectrobes: Origins (化石超進化 スペクトロブス：オリジンズ, Kaseki Chōshinka Supekutorobusu: Orijinzu; Fossil Super-Evolution Spectrobes: Origins) is an action role-playing game developed by Genki and published by Disney Interactive Studios and is the third and apparent final entry in the Spectrobes series. It is the first and only Spectrobes game in the series to be developed by Genki or to be exclusive for the Wii. The game was released in the US on August 18, 2009, a European release on September 18 and an Australian release on October 4. The Japanese version was released on June 17, 2010. As of 2010, it is the last game in the Spectrobes franchise.

== Plot ==
The main story follows the two protagonists, Rallen and Jeena, when they are sent through a portal which leads them to another star system which is being invaded by a massive army of Krawl. They must use the Cosmolink, an ancient device for summoning Spectrobes, to defeat the Krawl leader, Krux, to finally bring peace to the star system once and for all.

== Characters ==
Some notable characters in Spectrobes: Origins include Rallen, Jeena and Krux. There are also mythical creatures known as Spectrobes, which come in three stages (child, adult, evolved). Some popular ones include Komainu (child), Spikanor (adult) and Shakoblad (evolved). Spectrobes evolve from one stage to the next by using the Sanctuary.

== Gameplay ==
Spectrobes: Origins gameplay features the unique Wii controls to explore vast worlds, excavate three-dimensional fossils and unravel an engaging story while discovering the key to preventing a galactic threat. While immersed in the universe as never before, players fight enemies by controlling planetary patrol officers, Rallen and Jeena, with a Spectrobe creature at their side in large-scale, real-time battles. The game has free roam and multiple planets to explore.

=== Encounter Battles ===
Encounter Battles are initiated when the player encounters a Krawl swarm while scanning for items or being ambushed. The player controls Rallen or Jeena who fight using the particular weapon that they have equipped, controlled by pressing the interact button. Different types of weapons allow the player to pull off different attacks such as the Cosmo Sword which can pull of 3 consecutive attacks while the Cosmo Lance pulls off one powerful single attack. While battling, the player also controls a single Spectrobe by their side. Players have the option to switch between any of six Spectrobes they can carry with them. Spectrobes are controlled with the Wii Remote. Swinging the Wii Remote vertically makes the Spectrobe attack, while swinging horizontally calls the Spectrobe back. The CH Gauge also makes a return from the previous titles. With each successful hit with a Spectrobe of at least level 10, the CH Gauge fills, and when it fills to a certain point, the Spectrobe may use its special attack, executed by the player tapping the B Button and crossing their arms with both Wii Remote and Nunchuk, before spreading them apart. In order to win the battles, all of the opposing Krawl must be destroyed. Spectrobes and Spectrobe masters have separate health bars and character leveling, and the latter can evade enemy attacks with Nunchuk gestures to avoid taking damage; total loss of health for the former renders it unusable for a while, while total loss of health for the latter results in a game over.

=== Excavation ===
Excavation also makes a return from the previous titles, however, some changes occur. Minerals and other various items can now be picked up after scanning without excavation. If the player finds a Spectrobe fossil (contained within a mystery pod), it may be taken to the patrol cruiser or to a save point to access the lab menu. From here the Spectrobe can be excavated via the use of the excavation tools such as a drill and laser. After the fossil is excavated, it can then be awakened into a Spectrobe. In some cases, a mineral may be found in a mystery pod rather than a Spectrobe.

=== Spectrobes ===
Spectrobes: Origins features both new and old Spectrobes, however all Spectrobes have been assigned new properties. Corona is replaced with Fire, Aurora is replaced with Plant and Flash is replaced with Water. Additionally two new types of properties are Sky and Earth. Child Spectrobes are also divided into two types of properties: ground and airborne. Ground Spectrobes can crawl into small areas, while flying ones can reach inaccessible heights to solve puzzles, allowing Rallen and Jeena to get past.

== Reception ==
Reception

Aggregate score
Aggregator	Score
Metacritic	71/100

Review scores
Publication	Score
1Up.com	B
Famitsu	31/40
GameRevolution	C+
GameSpot	6/10
GameZone	7.7/10
IGN	8/10
NGamer	61%
Nintendo Power	5.5/10
Official Nintendo Magazine	73%
PALGN	7.5/10

Spectrobes: Origins received "average" reviews according to the review aggregation website Metacritic. In Japan, Famitsu gave it a score of three eights and one seven for a total of 31 out of 40.
