= Peter Pan: Adventures in Never Land =

2002 video game

- PAL region cover art
- Developers: Doki Denki; Crawfish Interactive (GBA)
- Publishers: PlayStation; Sony Computer Entertainment; Windows; Disney Interactive; Game Boy Advance: NA: Disney Interactive; EU: Ubi Soft
- Director: Pascal Stradella (PS1)
- Producer: Olivier Gaudino (PS1)
- Designers: Christophe Garnier (PS1); David Theodore (GBA)
- Programmers: Jean Christophe Capdevila (PS1); David Theodore (GBA)
- Artist: Paul Mitchell (GBA)
- Composers: Philippe Codecco (PS1); Guillaume Saurel (PS1); Steve Rocket (GBA)
- Series: Peter Pan
- Platforms: PlayStation; Windows; Game Boy Advance
- Release: NA: 13 February 2002; EU: 15 March 2002
- Genre: Action
- Mode: Single-player

Peter Pan: Adventures in Never Land (also known as Peter Pan in Return to Never Land in North America) is a 2002 action game developed by Doki Denki and published by Sony Computer Entertainment for the PlayStation. Disney Interactive released the game on Windows. It was released as a tie-in to Return to Never Land. An abridged version for the Game Boy Advance developed by Crawfish Interactive was released the same year.

== Plot ==
Captain Hook is after hidden treasure, and it is up to Peter Pan and Tinker Bell to reach the treasure first.

== Gameplay ==
The PlayStation and Windows versions are Metroidvanias. It is unique in that Peter can fly at the beginning of the game, removing the need to jump, but obstacles are still required to avoid while items such as a knife, pixie dust or panpipes must be acquired to access more areas. In between levels, players can use the game's currency (feathers) to buy items from a shop.

In the Game Boy Advance version, however, Peter cannot fly and the game consequently plays like a standard side-scrolling platformer.

== Reception ==
Metacritic has a rating of 52% based on 5 critic reviews. IGN gave the game a 5.3, writing "anyone who has already hit puberty should feed this one to the crocodiles".
