= Spectrobes =

Video game franchise

- Genre(s): Action role-playing
- Developer(s): Jupiter; Genki
- Publisher(s): Disney Interactive Studios (currently Disney Parks, Experiences and Products)
- Platform(s): Nintendo DS; Nintendo Wii

Spectrobes is a video game franchise consisting of three installments, the most recent of which was released in 2009.

== Spectrobes ==
Spectrobes is a science fiction video game that was developed by Kyoto-based game developer Jupiter, known for being the developer of Kingdom Hearts: Chain of Memories, and published by Disney Interactive Studios for the Nintendo DS. Disney Interactive Studios has stated that Spectrobes is its first original intellectual property; that is, a game not based on any film or TV program from its parent company.

The game was considered a commercial success and Disney Interactive Studios announced that more than 700,000 copies of the game had shipped worldwide in the first month and it was the best-selling third-party (not published by Nintendo, Microsoft, or Sony) game for March 2007, ranking #7 over all that month.

The game was re-released on November 6, 2007 as part of a special Spectrobes: Collector's Edition bundle, which included the game itself, all thirty-eight input code cards plus two exclusive Geo input cards, and a mini-guide.

== Beyond the Portals ==
Spectrobes: Beyond the Portals is an Action RPG video game developed by Jupiter and published by Disney Interactive Studios. The game was released in North America on October 7, 2008, December 11 in Japan and February 27, 2009 in Europe.

== Origins ==
Spectrobes: Origins is an Action RPG video game developed by Genki and published by Disney Interactive Studios and is the third entry in the Spectrobes series. It is the first Spectrobes game in the series to be developed by Genki and to be exclusive for the Wii. The game was released in the US on August 18, 2009 following the European release on September 18 and an Australian release on October 4. The Japanese version was released on June 17, 2010.
