= DGamer =

Disney online video game service (2008–2013)

- The DGamer Logo
- Developer: Fall Line Studio, Disney Interactive Studios
- Launched: May 15, 2008
- Platforms: Web, Nintendo DS
- Status: Discontinued as of March 15, 2013

DGamer (Disney Gamer) was an online game and social network service developed by Disney for use with Nintendo DS games. DGamer was accessible via the Nintendo Wi-Fi Connection or computer via the DGamer Channel on Disney.com. The service was implemented by Fall Line Studios and Disney Interactive Studios. It allowed users to create avatars, communicate with other users, access leaderboards, and track in-game honors. Completion of honors would unlock additional items for avatar customization.

Communication through the service was offered through several modes. Speed Chat mandated users "communicate using a predetermined list of words and phrases", Speed Chat Plus which allowed "free-form typing" with a filter for expletives and sexually suggestive language, and Open Chat, which required an external exchange of "friend codes".

The service launched in North America on May 15, 2008, coinciding with the release of the DS version of The Chronicles of Narnia: Prince Caspian. DGamer's Wi-Fi connections were retired on March 15, 2013. It can still be used via local wireless connections, but is no longer able to connect to the Nintendo Wi-Fi Connection service.

== Supported games ==
- The Chronicles of Narnia: Prince Caspian
- Spectrobes: Beyond the Portals
- Ultimate Band
- The Cheetah Girls: Passport to Stardom
- Club Penguin: Elite Penguin Force
- Club Penguin: Elite Penguin Force: Herbert's Revenge
- Disney Fairies: Tinker Bell
- Bolt
- High School Musical 3: Senior Year
- Phineas and Ferb
- Hannah Montana: The Movie
- G-Force
- Wizards of Waverly Place
- JONAS
- Tinker Bell and the Lost Treasure
- A Christmas Carol
- The Princess and the Frog
- Sonny with a Chance
- Alice in Wonderland
- Disney Stitch Jam
- Camp Rock 2: The Final Jam
- Phineas and Ferb: Ride Again
- Tinker Bell and the Great Fairy Rescue
- Tron: Evolution
- Wizards of Waverly Place: Spellbound
- Tangled: The Video Game
- Toy Story 3
- The Suite Life of Zack & Cody: Circle of Spies
- The Sorcerer's Apprentice
