= Adaptations of The Chronicles of Narnia =

The Chronicles of Narnia is a series of seven fantasy novels for children written by C. S. Lewis. It is considered a classic of children's literature and is the author's best-known work, having sold over 120 million copies in 47 languages. Written by Lewis between 1949 and 1954, illustrated by Pauline Baynes and published in London between October 1950 and September 1956, The Chronicles of Narnia has been adapted several times, complete or in part, for television, radio, the stage, film, in audio books, and as video games.

== Television ==
The Lion, the Witch and the Wardrobe was first adapted for television in 1967. The ten episodes, each thirty minutes long, were directed by Helen Standage. The screenplay was written by Trevor Preston. Like a lot of television of the era, it is missing from the archives, with only the first and eighth episodes known to survive, along with an audio recording of episode 7.

The Lion, the Witch and the Wardrobe was adapted for television again in 1979, this time as an animated special co-produced by Bill Melendez (known for A Charlie Brown Christmas and other Peanuts specials) and the Children's Television Workshop (known for programs such as Sesame Street and The Electric Company). The screenplay was by David D. Connell. It won the Emmy award for Outstanding Animated Program that year. It was the first feature-length animated film ever made for television. For its release on British television, many of the characters' voices were re-recorded by British actors and actresses (including Leo McKern, Arthur Lowe and Sheila Hancock), but Stephen Thorne was the voice of "Aslan" in both the U.S. and British versions.

From 1988 to 1990, parts of The Chronicles of Narnia were turned into three successful BBC television serials, The Chronicles of Narnia, based on the first four of the seven books. All three were shown on the PBS show WonderWorks and they were nominated for a total of 14 awards, including an Emmy in the category of "Outstanding Children's Program". The three serials were later released as three feature-length films and released on VHS and DVD.

== Film ==
=== Walden Media ===
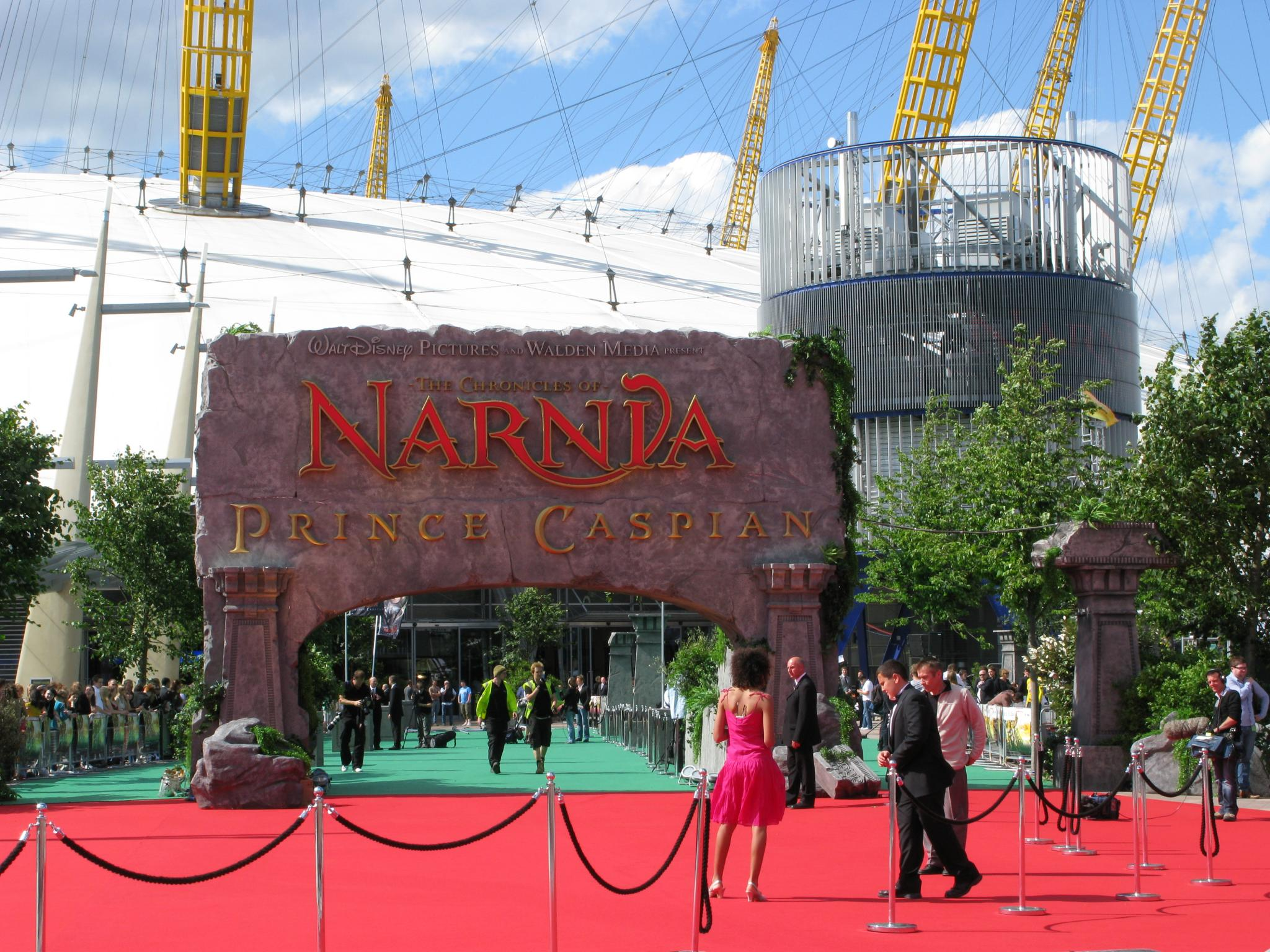
The premiere of The Chronicles of Narnia: Prince Caspian in 2008

C. S. Lewis never sold the film rights to the Narnia series, being skeptical that any cinematic adaptation could render the more fantastical elements and characters of the story realistically. Only after seeing a demo reel of CGI animals did Douglas Gresham (Lewis's stepson and literary executor, and the films' co-producer) give approval for a film adaptation.

The first film was an adaptation of The Lion, the Witch and the Wardrobe, entitled The Chronicles of Narnia: The Lion, the Witch and the Wardrobe, produced by Walden Media and Walt Disney Pictures, and released in December 2005. It was directed by Andrew Adamson, with a screenplay by Ann Peacock. Principal photography for the film took place in Poland, the Czech Republic and New Zealand. Major Visual Effects Studios like Rhythm and Hues Studios, Sony Pictures Imageworks, Industrial Light & Magic (ILM) and many more worked on the VFX for the movie. The movie achieved critical and box-office success, reaching the Top 25 of all films released to that time (by revenue).

Disney and Walden Media then co-produced a sequel, The Chronicles of Narnia: Prince Caspian, released in May 2008 and grossed over $419 million worldwide. At the time of Caspian's release, Disney was already in pre-production on the next chapter, The Chronicles of Narnia: The Voyage of the Dawn Treader. However, in December 2008 Disney pulled out of financing the Narnia series.

Fox 2000 Pictures and Walden Media co-produced The Chronicles of Narnia: The Voyage of the Dawn Treader, distributed by 20th Century Fox and released in December 2010.

Plans for adapting the next book in the series, The Silver Chair, were put on hold as Walden Media chose to reboot the series with The Magician's Nephew, chronologically the first in the series. However they made no attempt to retain the film rights, which lapsed in 2011.

In October 2013, development began on a potential fourth film, The Silver Chair, with the Mark Gordon Company producing. On December 5 of that year, Finding Neverland scribe David Magee was announced as the screenwriter for the film. Joe Johnston (director of Captain America: The First Avenger, among others) was brought on board to helm the movie in April 2017.

=== Netflix ===
On October 3, 2018, the C.S. Lewis Company announced that Netflix had acquired the rights to new film and television series adaptations of the Narnia books. According to Fortune, this was the first time that rights to the entire Narnia catalogue had been held by a single company. Entertainment One, which had acquired production rights to a fourth Narnia film, also joined the series. Mark Gordon, Douglas Gresham and Vincent Sieber will serve as executive producers. In December of that year, Magee confirmed via Twitter that he was not involved with the new productions.

On June 12, 2019, Gordon hired Coco co-writer Matthew Aldrich to be the creative architect of the Netflix adaptation. On 3 July 2023, it was announced that Greta Gerwig had been hired to write and direct at least two Narnia films for Netflix. Gerwig's adaptation was planned to release exclusively in IMAX theaters on Thanksgiving Day in 2026, before premiering on Netflix in December 2026. However, the film was delayed until February 12, 2027, with the additional announcement the film would receive a full wide theatrical release. Casting notices for young actors to appear in a first installment were released in 2025, with news outlets suggesting that the number of roles being cast for pointed to an adaptation of either The Magician's Nephew or The Silver Chair. In March and April 2025, listings from Production Weekly and Production List referred to the production as Narnia: The Magician's Nephew. Producer Amy Pascal said that filming was expected to start in July 2025. The Times reported in 2024 that filming would take place at Shepperton Studios. Throughout April and May 2025, THR announced that Emma Mackey, Daniel Craig, Meryl Streep, and Carey Mulligan had entered negotiations to join the cast, with Mackey officially cast as the White Witch. The filming for the first film began on August 11, 2025 in London, and concluded on January 31, 2026.

== Stage ==
A licensed musical stage adaptation of The Voyage of the Dawn Treader made its world premiere in 1983 by Northwestern College in Minnesota at the Totino Fine Arts Center. Script adaptation by Wayne Olson, with original music score by Kevin Norberg.

In 1984, The Lion, the Witch and the Wardrobe was presented at London's Westminster Theatre, produced by Vanessa Ford Productions. The play, adapted by Glyn Robbins, was directed by Richard Williams and designed by Marty Flood; and was revived at Westminster and The Royalty Theatre and on tour until 1997. Productions of other Narnian tales were also presented, including The Voyage of the Dawn Treader (1986), The Magician's Nephew (1988) and The Horse and His Boy (1990). Robbins's adaptations of the Narnian chronicles are available for production in the UK through Samuel French London.

In 1986, Jules Tasca wrote an adaptation called Narnia: The Musical, with music by Thomas Tierney and lyrics by Ted Drachman. A streamlined version of this musical has toured the US with TheatreworksUSA since 1993. The full-scale and touring versions of the musical are licensed through Dramatic Publishing, which has also licensed adaptations of The Lion, the Witch and the Wardrobe by Joseph Robinette and The Magician's Nephew by Aurand Harris.

In 1998 the Royal Shakespeare Company premiered The Lion, the Witch and the Wardrobe. The novel was adapted for the stage by Adrian Mitchell, with music by Shaun Davey. The musical was originally directed by Adrian Noble and designed by Anthony Ward, with the revival directed by Lucy Pitman-Wallace. The production was well received and ran during the holiday season from 1998 at the Royal Shakespeare Theatre in Stratford-upon-Avon. The production subsequently transferred to play limited engagements in London at the Barbican Theatre, and at Sadler's Wells. The London Evening Standard called it a "gloriously resonant production". Mitchell's adaptation later premiered in the US with the Minneapolis Children's Theatre Company in 2000, and had its west-coast premiere with Seattle Children's Theatre, playing the Christmas slot in its 2002–03 season (and was revived for the 2003–04 season). This adaptation is licensed for performance in the UK by Samuel French.

In 2011, a two-actor stage adaptation (published 1989) by Le Clanché du Rand opened Off-Broadway in New York City at St. Luke's Theatre. The production was directed by Julia Beardsley O'Brien and starred Erin Layton and Andrew Fortman. In 2014, it ran with a replacement cast of Abigail Taylor-Sansom and Rockford Sansom.

Other notable stage productions of The Lion, the Witch and the Wardrobe have included a 2002 production by Trumpets Theatre, one of the largest commercial theatres in the Philippines, and a 2003 commercial production by Malcolm C. Cooke Productions in Australia (directed by Nadia Tass, and described by Douglas Gresham as the best production of the novel he had seen – starring Amanda Muggleton, Dennis Olsen, Meaghan Davies and Yolande Brown).

Theatrical productions of "The Chronicles of Narnia" have become popular with professional, community and youth theatres in recent years. A musical version of The Lion, the Witch and the Wardrobe written specifically for performance by youth is available through Josef Weinberger.

In 2015, a musical comedy adaptation was staged by Centro de Música y Comedia Musical CEEC (Buenos Aires, Argentina) named Narnia: Vuelve a vivir. The production was made by Gabriel Bedrossian as music and lyrics composer, Silvia Mignaqui as theatre director, and Jimena Valiño as choreographer. The musical was played on Auditorio CEEC (December 2015), Teatro Gran Rivadavia (March 2016), Cachi, and Payogasta, sponsored by IBM Argentina (Salta, June 2016), Tandil (Buenos Aires, June 2017) at Teatro del Fuerte as a solidarity event (sponsored by Mesa Solidaria and again IBM). The performances were sold out.

In 2022, the Logos Theater, of Taylors, South Carolina, created a stage adaptation of The Horse and His Boy, with later performances at the Museum of the Bible and Ark Encounter.

== Radio ==
The Lion, the Witch and the Wardrobe, a Children’s Hour serial in 6 parts, adapted by Lance Sieveking and produced by David Davis, was first broadcast:on Sunday 24 Apr 1960 at 17:00 on the BBC Home Service (https://genome.ch.bbc.co.uk). It starred Deryck Guyler as Aslan

A BBC Radio 4 dramatisation of The Chronicles of Narnia was produced between 1988 and 1997, starring Maurice Denham as Professor Kirke. Collectively titled Tales of Narnia it covers the entire series and is approximately 15 hours long. The series was released in Great Britain on both audio cassette and CD by BBC Audiobooks. In 2014, the whole series was released (in the author's preferred order) as a single audio book on Audible titled The Complete Chronicles of Narnia by BBC Worldwide with a total runtime of 15 hours 11 minutes.

Between 1999 and 2002 Focus on the Family produced radio dramatisations of all 7 books through its Radio Theatre program. The production included a cast of over a hundred actors (including Paul Scofield as "The Storyteller" and David Suchet as Aslan), an original orchestral score and cinema-quality digital sound design. The total running time is slightly over 22 hours. Douglas Gresham, the stepson of C. S. Lewis, hosts the series.

The Focus on the Family version was broadcast on the BBC in the mid-2000s. Currently, the BBC distributes both their own original Radio 4 version and the "Focus on the Family" version, the former under the banner "BBC Radio Presents" and the latter under the banner "BBC Radio Theatre". In the United States, the former is available only on audio cassette and the latter is distributed on CD.

== Audio books ==
The Chronicles of Narnia are all available on audiobook, read by Andrew Sachs. These were published by Chivers Children's Audio Books.

In 1979, Caedmon Records released abridged versions of all seven books on records and cassettes, read by Ian Richardson (The Lion, the Witch and the Wardrobe and The Silver Chair), Claire Bloom (Prince Caspian and The Magician's Nephew), Anthony Quayle (The Voyage of the Dawn Treader and The Horse and his Boy) and Michael York (The Last Battle).

In 1981, Sir Michael Hordern read abridged versions of the classic tales set to music from Marisa Robles, playing the harp, and Christopher Hyde-Smith, playing the flute. They have also been re-released in 2005 by Collins Audio. (ISBN 978-0-00-721153-1).

HarperAudio published the series on audiobook, read by British and Irish actors Michael York (The Lion, the Witch and the Wardrobe), Lynn Redgrave (Prince Caspian), Derek Jacobi (The Voyage of the Dawn Treader), Jeremy Northam (The Silver Chair), Alex Jennings (The Horse and his Boy), Kenneth Branagh (The Magician's Nephew) and Patrick Stewart (The Last Battle).

Collins Audio also released the series on audiobook read by the actor Tom Baker.

From 1998 to 2003 Focus on the Family Radio Theatre recorded all seven Chronicles of Narnia on CD. The first two released volumes, The Magician's Nephew and The Lion, the Witch and the Wardrobe, which had two CDs or cassettes each, with each successive volume getting 3 CDs. They were released in association with The C.S. Lewis Company, with an introduction by Douglas Gresham. They used a cast of over one hundred actors, an original orchestral score, and digital sound design. The stars of the cast were Paul Scofield as the storyteller, David Suchet as Aslan, Elizabeth Counsell as the White Witch and Richard Suchet as Caspian X.

== Music ==
A musical retelling of The Lion, the Witch and the Wardrobe in a full-album song-cycle entitled The Roar of Love was released in 1980 by the contemporary Christian music group 2nd Chapter of Acts.

The track "The Chronicles" from the 2006 album The Twilight Chronicles, by the English Melodic Hard Rock band Ten recounts the tale of The Lion, the Witch and the Wardrobe.

The track "In Like a Lion (Always Winter)" from the 2007 album Let It Snow, Baby... Let It Reindeer, by the American rock band Relient K is inspired by, and references, The Lion, the Witch and the Wardrobe.

== Games ==
In 1984, Word Publishing released Adventures in Narnia, a game developed by Lifeware. The game was intended to encourage positive values like self-control and sacrifice. It incorporated physical elements such as cards and dice into the gameplay and was available on the Commodore 64.

In 1988 a series of 5 gamebooks were released with a 6th & 7th unpublished. They were called Narnia Solo Games & the first 4 were even released in a gift boxset. They contained role playing elements & where entitled: 1) Return to Deathwater 2) The Sorceress & the Book of Spells 3) Leap of the Lion 4) The Lost Crowns of Cair Paravel 5) Return of the White Witch 6) The Magician's Rings & 7) Keeper of the Dreamstone.

In November 2005, Buena Vista Games, a publishing label of Disney, released videogame adaptations of the Walden Media/Walt Disney Pictures The Chronicles of Narnia: The Lion, the Witch and the Wardrobe film. Versions were developed for most videogame platforms available at the time including Microsoft Windows, GameCube, Xbox, and PlayStation 2 (developed by the UK-based developer Traveller's Tales). A handheld version of the game was also developed by Amaze Entertainment for the Nintendo DS and Game Boy Advance. A mobile game of the film was developed by the Finnish Housemarque for the J2ME/Brew.

By 2008, Buena Vista Games released new videogame adaptations of Walden Media/Walt Disney Pictures The Chronicles of Narnia: Prince Caspian film. Versions were developed for the most common platforms at that time, including Xbox 360, PlayStation 2, PlayStation 3, Wii and Microsoft Windows (developed by the UK-based developer Traveller's Tales). A handheld version of the game was also developed for Nintendo DS.

Although Disney had dropped the franchise by June 2010, and it was confirmed that a console game based on the film adaptation of The Voyage of the Dawn Treader was canceled, a mobile game of the film was released in late 2010, since Fox had taken over the franchise. The game was created by Fox Digital Entertainment in partnership with the video game developer, Gameloft.

- List of video games

| Title | Year | Publisher | Developer | Platforms | Metacritic score |
|---|---|---|---|---|---|
| Adventures in Narnia | 1984 | Word Publishing | Gruen Studios; Lifeware | Apple II | N/A |
| Adventures in Narnia | 1984 | Word Publishing | Gruen Studios; Lifeware | Commodore 64 | N/A |
| Adventures in Narnia: Dawn Treader | 1984 | Word Publishing | Gruen Studios; Lifeware | Apple II | N/A |
| Adventures in Narnia: Dawn Treader | 1984 | Word Publishing | Gruen Studios; Lifeware | Commodore 64 | N/A |
| The Chronicles of Narnia: The Lion, the Witch and the Wardrobe | 2005 | Buena Vista Games | Traveller's Tales | Windows | 71 |
| The Chronicles of Narnia: The Lion, the Witch and the Wardrobe | 2005 | Buena Vista Games | Traveller's Tales | Xbox | 72 |
| The Chronicles of Narnia: The Lion, the Witch and the Wardrobe | 2005 | Buena Vista Games | Traveller's Tales | PlayStation 2 | 68 |
| The Chronicles of Narnia: The Lion, the Witch and the Wardrobe | 2005 | Buena Vista Games | Traveller's Tales | GameCube | 71 |
| The Chronicles of Narnia: The Lion, the Witch and the Wardrobe | 2005 | Buena Vista Games | Amaze Entertainment | Nintendo DS | 65 |
| The Chronicles of Narnia: The Lion, the Witch and the Wardrobe | 2005 | Buena Vista Games | Amaze Entertainment | Game Boy Advance | 66 |
| The Chronicles of Narnia: The Lion, the Witch and the Wardrobe (mobile action game) | 2005 | Disney Mobile | UIEvolution | Mobile Phone | N/A |
| The Chronicles of Narnia: The Lion, the Witch and the Wardrobe (mobile strategy game) | 2005 | Disney Mobile | UIEvolution | Mobile Phone | N/A |
| The Chronicles of Narnia: The Lion, the Witch and the Wardrobe - Chess | 2005 | Disney Mobile | UIEvolution | Mobile Phone | N/A |
| The Chronicles of Narnia: Prince Caspian | 2008 | Disney Interactive Studios | Traveller's Tales | Windows | 53 |
| The Chronicles of Narnia: Prince Caspian | 2008 | Disney Interactive Studios | Traveller's Tales | Xbox 360 | 56 |
| The Chronicles of Narnia: Prince Caspian | 2008 | Disney Interactive Studios | Traveller's Tales | PlayStation 3 | 56 |
| The Chronicles of Narnia: Prince Caspian | 2008 | Disney Interactive Studios | Traveller's Tales | PlayStation 2 | 67 |
| The Chronicles of Narnia: Prince Caspian | 2008 | Disney Interactive Studios | Traveller's Tales | Wii | 63 |
| The Chronicles of Narnia: Prince Caspian | 2008 | Disney Interactive Studios | Fall Line Studios | Nintendo DS | 54 |
| The Chronicles of Narnia: Prince Caspian (mobile game) | 2008 | Disney Mobile | Enorbus Technologies | Mobile Phone | N/A |
| The Chronicles of Narnia: The Voyage of the Dawn Treader (mobile game) | 2010 | Fox Digital Entertainment; Gameloft | Gameloft Software Beijing; Gameloft Software Shanghai | Mobile Phone | N/A |
| The Chronicles of Narnia: The Voyage of the Dawn Treader (mobile game) | 2010 | Fox Digital Entertainment; Gameloft | Gameloft Software Beijing; Gameloft Software Shanghai | iOS | N/A |

- List of cancelled video games and ports

| Title | Year | Publisher | Developer | Platforms |
|---|---|---|---|---|
| The Chronicles of Narnia: The Lion, the Witch and the Wardrobe | 2005 | Buena Vista Games | Amaze Entertainment | PSP |
| The Chronicles of Narnia: The Voyage of the Dawn Treader | 2010 | Disney Interactive Studios | Nihilistic Software | Xbox 360; PlayStation 3 Microsoft Windows; Wii |

== See also ==
- A YouTube playlist featuring many of the songs from the Trumpets Workshop production of The Lion, the Witch and the Wardrobe (LWW)
- "Come to the Table," a song from the Royal Shakespeare Company production of LWW (here performed by the GTC at the Picturedrome Theater)
