= Ultimate Band =

2008 video game

- Developer: Fall Line Studios
- Publisher: Disney Interactive Studios
- Platforms: Nintendo DS, Wii
- Release: NA: November 25, 2008; EU: April 9, 2009; AU: April 14, 2009
- Genre: Music video game
- Modes: Single-player, multiplayer

Ultimate Band is a music video game for the Nintendo DS & Wii. It is developed by Fall Line Studios, and published by Disney Interactive Studios.

== Gameplay ==
Ultimate Band allows players to play guitar, drums, bass or be the front man or woman in a band (though vocals are not supported). The Wii version follows the fortunes of an upstart rock band, with the player building the career of their customizable character, unlocking bonus songs, venues and accessories.

Ultimate Band forgoes the use of specialized peripherals such as guitar and drum controllers, relying mainly on the Wii Remote and Nunchuk for the Wii version, and the touch screen and stylus for the DS version. For example, to play notes on guitar in the Wii version the player must press a button combination on the Nunchuk while strumming the Wii Remote up and down. The DS version, based on Hannah Montana: Music Jam's code base, will also allow players to create and record their own songs, and have greater song customization options.

Ultimate Band features support for Disney Interactive's DGamer community network. The game will also feature connectivity between the Wii and DS versions, with DS players being able to control stage lighting and effects using the touch screen while a band performs on the Wii.

== Soundtrack ==
The Wii version of game features over 30 songs which comprise "a broad selection of current hits and all-time rock favorites" by "some of the biggest names in rock, alternative, popular, emo, and indie rock music". The DS version only contains 15 songs, 11 from the Wii soundtrack and 4 exclusive to the DS.

All songs are cover versions in order to better tweak the music to fit with the game, to self-censor explicit lyrics, and to allow both male and female vocalists.

Song title	Artist	Wii	DS
"All Day and All of the Night"	The Kinks	✓	✓
"All Right Now"	Free	✓	-
"All Star"	Smash Mouth	-	✓
"Always Where I Need to Be"	The Kooks	✓	-
"Anna Molly"	Incubus	✓	-
"Beverly Hills"	Weezer	✓	-
"Break on Through (To the Other Side)"	The Doors	✓	-
"Call Me"	Blondie	-	✓
"Club Foot"	Kasabian	✓	-
"Complicated"	Avril Lavigne	✓	-
"Crushcrushcrush"	Paramore	✓	-
"Dashboard"	Modest Mouse	✓	-
"Debaser"	Pixies	✓	-
"Fell in Love With a Girl"	The White Stripes	✓	-
"First Date"	Blink-182	✓	✓
"Get the Party Started"	Pink	✓	-
"Girl's Not Grey"	AFI	✓	-
"Hanging on the Telephone"	Blondie	✓	-
"Helena"	My Chemical Romance	✓	-
"Hold On"	Jonas Brothers	✓	✓
"I Want You To Want Me"	Cheap Trick	✓	-
"In Too Deep"	Sum 41	✓	-
"Jenny Was a Friend of Mine"	The Killers	-	✓
"Just"	Radiohead	✓	-
"Just What I Needed"	The Cars	✓	✓
"Move Along"	The All-American Rejects	✓	✓
"My Generation"	Green Day	✓	✓
"Natural Disaster	Plain White T's	✓	-
"Nine in the Afternoon"	Panic! at the Disco	-	✓
"Our Time Now"	Plain White T's	✓	✓
"Rock Lobster"	The B-52's	✓	✓
"Somebody Told Me"	The Killers	✓	-
"Song 2"	Blur	✓	-
"Steady, As She Goes"	The Raconteurs	✓	✓
"Stumble and Fall"	Razorlight	✓	-
"The Take Over, the Breaks Over"	Fall Out Boy	✓	✓
"Unconditional"	The Bravery	✓	-
"When Did Your Heart Go Missing?"	Rooney	✓	-
"Whip It"	Devo	✓	✓
"Won't Go Home Without You"	Maroon 5	✓	-

== Reception ==
Reception

Aggregate scores
Aggregator	Score
GameRankings	76.40% 65.29%(Wii)
Metacritic	59/100; 69/100

Review scores
Publication	Score
GameSpot	6/10
GamesRadar+	3.5/5
IGN	7/10

1UP.com gave the game a D grade, believing the Remote-based controls felt "disconnected" and that the soundtrack was "anemic", with "generic, sometimes embarrassing vocalists". GameSpot was more positive, scoring it a 6.0/10 and praising the game's family-friendly presentation and use of both male and female vocals being recorded for each song, yet were less impressed by its "finicky" controls and unreliable gesture recognition.

== See also ==
- Guitar Hero World Tour
- Rock Band
- Rock Revolution
