= Phineas and Ferb (video game) =

2009 video game

- North American box art
- Developer: Altron
- Publisher: Disney Interactive Studios
- Director: Hidekazu Komori
- Programmers: Shinya Nagakawa; Naoto Kominato; Tasuku Ikarashi
- Artists: Hidekazu Komori; Daisuke Nakano; Katsuki Yamaguchi
- Composer: Tomoyoshi Sato
- Series: Phineas and Ferb
- Platform: Nintendo DS
- Release: NA: February 3, 2009; UK: March 23, 2009; EU: March 27, 2009; AU: September 23, 2009
- Genres: Action, platform
- Mode: Single-player

Phineas and Ferb (also known as Phineas and Ferb: The Video Game) is a 2009 action-platform video game developed by Altron and published by Disney Interactive Studios for the Nintendo DS, based on the animated television series of the same name. It was released in North America on February 3, 2009, followed by the United Kingdom on March 23, Europe on March 27, and Australia on September 23.

The game's plot is similar to the show, as the player controls Phineas Flynn and his stepbrother Ferb Fletcher as they take part in several schemes and adventures for their summer vacation. The two as well attempt to avoid their sister Candace, who is persistent in trying to "bust" them. Mini games are scattered throughout the game, building up the side foundation.

The game was not affiliated with the creators of the show itself, Dan Povenmire and Jeff "Swampy" Marsh. The two had little to no information on it until its release. The game as well features an in-between mini game, featuring Perry the Platypus fighting and foiling the plans of Dr. Heinz Doofenshmirtz, an evil mad scientist.

== Plot ==
Excited for their upcoming trip to the Danville Super Fun Park, Phineas and Ferb decide to build their own rollercoaster. They head through the suburbs to acquire parts, attracting their sister Candace's attention. They soon build a simple coaster and test-ride it. Taking longer than they thought, the duo dismantles the ride and plans to build an even bigger one the next day using the skills they learend. The next day sees Phineas and Ferb venturing deeper into Danville to acquire more parts for an even bigger rollercoaster, which they build in their own fun fair. Once they finished building it, they test it with their friends. Candace attempts to bust the boys, but they returned home before their mom arrived.

The next day, it's too hot for Phineas and Ferb to do anything, but their father suggests using his old snow cone machine. Inspired, Phineas decides to make "S'winter" using said machine to make a mountain and ride down the slopes. They venture through their own mountain for supplies, eventually building a snowboard capable of handling the mountain slopes. Candace tries to bring her parents to see the mountain, but it melted by the time she got back.

The following day, Phineas and Ferb are playing with their tricked-out remote control monster trucks. When their mother sees this but thinks they are imagining the monster trucks, Phineas is inspired to make real monster trucks, with the added bonus of helping their sister with her parallel parking skills. They venture through the construction zone to get the parts needed for the monster truck. After they finished, they race around the track and help Candace with her parallel parking, somehow.

The proceeding day, yearning for a place to swim, Phineas gets the idea to make the whole neighborhood into a water park, venturing to a nearby mountain to collect parts and build the waterslide around. After completing it and finish testing the waterslide, Candace appears and, believing it to be impossible to make their waterslide and fun fair disappear, heads to get their mom. Phineas suddenly wonders where their pet platypus Perry is, unaware of Perry donning his secret agent hat and entering a tunnel disguised as a mushroom.

Perry is sent to infiltrate his nemesis Dr. Doofenshmirtz's lab, where Doof introduces his latest invention: Mr. Flataplatinator, a giant robot. He then tries to trap Perry, but he easily escapes. Perry fights Dr. Doofenshmirtz, culminating in Doof crashing at his old invention Shrinkspheria. Perry escapes as the robot explodes, triggering Shrinkspheria to activate, shrinking the fun fair, along with all of Phineas and Ferb's inventions.

Candace brings their mom, but she finds nothing wrong. Phineas and Ferb don't seem to mind their inventions disappearing. After they eat dinner, Ferb shows Phineas plans for building a time machine, which they use to travel to before their inventions disappeared. Upon arriving in the morning, they realize the machine is broken, leaving them stuck in the past. The brothers don't mind, as they have their inventions back.

== Gameplay ==
The game's each, individual seven levels are based on an episode of the television series. The first stage of the game consists of Phineas and Ferb beginning their plans to destroy and construct a giant roller coaster. Phineas primarily is the one in his duo to find and gather the tools and objects necessary for it, while Ferb primarily is used to actually utilize each device. The two need to avoid their sister, Candace, as she is persistent in her desire to bust them and get them in trouble with their mom. Once every part in the needed list is found, the two construct the devices in the form of little puzzles which end with the creation of roller coaster tracks and engines. Once everything has been completed, the two race on the roller coaster down the tracks to compete. Throughout their way, they also build other devices, from a water slide to a winter wonderland, and occasionally bump into the neighborhood bully, Buford. After constructing all five rides in the game, Candace prepares her ultimate busting attack, after which Phineas remarks "Hey, where's Perry?" The player suddenly finds themself playing as Perry the Platypus fighting in Doofenshmirtz Evil Inc, the player using the Touch Screen to help Perry fight Doof. After Perry's final attack, the resulting explosion obliterates all the rides Phineas and Ferb have made throughout the game, right as Candace drags her Mom into the backyard. Phineas and Ferb, not knowing what just happened, build a time machine and send themselves back to before the rides were destroyed.

== Development ==
The game was inspired by the top-rated Disney animated series Phineas and Ferb, which was created by Dan Povenmire and Jeff "Swampy" Marsh. The series was inspired by Povenmire's youth growing up in Mobile, Alabama, where his mother encouraged him to go out and do projects. He met and befriended Marsh while working on The Simpsons, later moving on with him to work on Rocko's Modern Life, where they initially created the series. Years later, the two pitched it and got it on Disney Channel.

The game itself was published by Disney Interactive Studios. Altron, a Japanese private game developer and publisher, developed the game. The game had no actual connection with the show creators; Povenmire knew almost nothing about the game until he was given it himself. Phineas and Ferb makes use of a program known as DGamer, which allows the player to connect to an online community via the Nintendo Wi-Fi connection. This was a large part of marketing the game during release and apparently was a key part to development.

== Release and reception ==
Phineas and Ferb

Aggregate scores
Aggregator	Score
GameRankings	76.67%
Metacritic	80/100

Review score
Publication	Score
GameTrailers	1.0/10

The game's reviews have been generally positive. GameRankings averages a 76.67% approval ratings, based on a cast of ratings. Among them include eight out of ten and seventy-eight out of one hundred. GameTrailers gives it a 1.0 due to the lack of actual reviews, though the European trailer ranks an average of 4.1. It as well puts it as number 5,420 out of the total games of 8,005, while it is 860 out of the total 932 of DS games.

Chad Sapieha states in his review on Common Sense Media that the game is "fine entertainment for elementary school kids". He as well states the interaction is entertaining. He does, however, say that the rides that take a great amount of time to construct are very anticlimactic and the weakest part of the game, as well as the controls being stiff. Even so, he states it is "undeniably an above-average interactive incarnation of a kids cartoon".

== Sequel ==
The second Phineas and Ferb video game was released on the Nintendo DS on September 14, 2010, called Phineas and Ferb: Ride Again. A video game based on the TV movie was released on August 2, 2011 for DS, Wii, and PlayStation 3. Phineas and Ferb: Quest for Cool Stuff was released on August 13, 2013 for DS, Wii, 3DS, Wii U and Xbox 360. Phineas and Ferb: Day of Doofenshmirtz was released for PlayStation Vita on November 10, 2015.
