= Phineas and Ferb =

American animated musical-comedy television series

- Genre: Science fiction comedy Surreal comedy Musical
- Created by: Dan Povenmire; Jeff "Swampy" Marsh
- Showrunners: Dan Povenmire; Jeff "Swampy" Marsh
- Voices of: Vincent Martella; Ashley Tisdale; Thomas Sangster; Caroline Rhea; Richard O'Brien; Alyson Stoner; Bobby Gaylor; Maulik Pancholy; Dan Povenmire; Jeff "Swampy" Marsh; Dee Bradley Baker; David Errigo Jr.
- Opening theme: "Today Is Gonna Be a Great Day" by Bowling for Soup
- Composer: Danny Jacob
- Country of origin: United States
- Original language: English
- No. of seasons: 6
- No. of episodes: 158 (list of episodes)

Production
- Executive producers: Dan Povenmire; Jeff "Swampy" Marsh (Note: Marsh is credited as a co-executive producer for the first two seasons.)
- Producers: Robert F. Hughes (season 4); Brandi Young (season 5–present); Susy Campos (season 5–present)
- Editors: Ted Supa (seasons 1–3); Anne Harting (season 3–present)
- Running time: 22 minutes
- Production company: Disney Television Animation (Note: Credited and known as Walt Disney Television Animation until 2011.)

Original release
- Network: Disney Channel; Disney XD (Note: Aired new episodes simultaneously with Disney Channel since 2009.)
- Release: August 17, 2007 – June 12, 2015
- Network: Disney Channel; Disney+
- Release: June 5, 2025 – present

Related
- Milo Murphy's Law; Hamster & Gretel

Phineas and Ferb is an American animated musical-comedy television series created by Dan Povenmire and Jeff "Swampy" Marsh for Disney Channel and Disney XD. The series originally aired on the networks for four seasons between 2007 and 2015, and returned for the first of two additional seasons in 2025. The series follows stepbrothers Phineas Flynn and Ferb Fletcher, who construct a grand project or embark on an adventure each day to make the most of their time on summer vacation, to the annoyance of Phineas' older sister Candace Flynn. Candace's attempts to expose their schemes to her mother always fail due to the fights between local evil scientist Dr. Heinz Doofenshmirtz and the boys' secret agent pet Perry the Platypus inadvertently removing all evidence of their work. The series follows a standard plot system, with several running gags occurring each episode.

Povenmire and Marsh conceived the characters while working together on animated programs The Simpsons and Rocko's Modern Life in the 1990s, and were inspired by the summers of their own childhoods. They developed the series together and pitched it to networks for 16 years before successfully selling it to The Walt Disney Company. Phineas and Ferb is produced by Disney Television Animation, and was originally broadcast as a one-episode preview on August 17, 2007, following the premiere of the made-for-television film High School Musical 2. It again previewed on September 28, 2007, and officially premiered on Disney Channel on February 1, 2008. The series originally concluded on June 12, 2015, before two new seasons were ordered in January 2023, with the fifth season premiering on Disney Channel on June 5, 2025, and on Disney+ the following day.

Phineas and Ferb is one of Disney Channel's most successful animated franchises. It received high viewership in the United States on cable television and influenced the development of merchandise, a live tour, spin-offs, and movies. A made-for-television film, Phineas and Ferb the Movie: Across the 2nd Dimension, aired in 2011, while a follow-up titled Phineas and Ferb the Movie: Candace Against the Universe was released on Disney+ in 2020. Critics praised the writing and humor of the show, citing its appeal to a wide range of ages. Others criticized its perceived lack of originality and formulaic approach. The series won a Daytime Emmy Award in 2010 for Outstanding Writing in Animation and several Primetime Emmy Awards for Outstanding Individual Achievement in Animation.

== Premise ==
The series follows the adventures of stepbrothers Phineas Flynn and Ferb Fletcher. They live in the fictional city of Danville, USA, in an unspecified tri-state area, as they seek ways to occupy their time during their "104 days of summer vacation". Often these adventures involve elaborate, life-sized, and ostensibly dangerous construction projects, which are usually unrealistic in scale given the protagonists' ages (and sometimes physically impossible). The stepbrothers primarily share their adventures with their friends Isabella Garcia-Shapiro, their neighbor from across the street who has a crush on Phineas, and Baljeet Tjinder and Buford Van Stomm, a nerd and bully duo of frenemies. Phineas's older sister Candace has two obsessions: unveiling Phineas and Ferb's schemes and ideas to her mother, and winning the attention of a boy named Jeremy.

The subplot almost always features Phineas and Ferb's pet platypus Perry, who works as a secret agent for an all-animal government organization named O.W.C.A. ("Organization Without a Cool Acronym"). His usual objective is to defeat the latest scheme of Dr. Heinz Doofenshmirtz, an evil scientist driven largely by a need to assert his evilness, whose own ineptitude often defeats him. The two plots intersect at the end of each episode, erasing all traces of the boys' project just before a dismayed Candace can show it to their mother and destroying Doofenshmirtz's evil contraption; either occurrence usually indirectly leads to the other's in some way.

== Episodes ==
External videos
- 🔴 LIVE! Phineas and Ferb Season 1 Full Episodes! | @disneychannelanimation — Livestream of Season 1 on YouTube

Most of the episodes premiered in pairs of two 11-minute stories, while others were released on their own. Disney Television Animation produced the episodes in two variants: they were primarily paired in 22-minute shows but also produced as individual episodes. Thus, a credits scene was made for each quarter-hour episode, while for the packaged variant, only the credits from the second "segment" would be used.

Currently, the series airs in a 22-minute format, with the separate variants being occasionally shown as fillers. Digital and streaming releases, like on iTunes and Disney+, have the episodes in pairs.

Season	Segments	Episodes	Originally released	
Season	Segments	Episodes	First released	Last released
1	47	26	August 17, 2007	February 18, 2009
2	65	39	February 19, 2009	February 11, 2011
3	62	35	March 4, 2011	November 30, 2012
4	49	37	December 7, 2012	June 12, 2015
5	38	20	June 5, 2025	January 16, 2026
6	TBA	20	October 6, 2026	TBA

== Characters ==
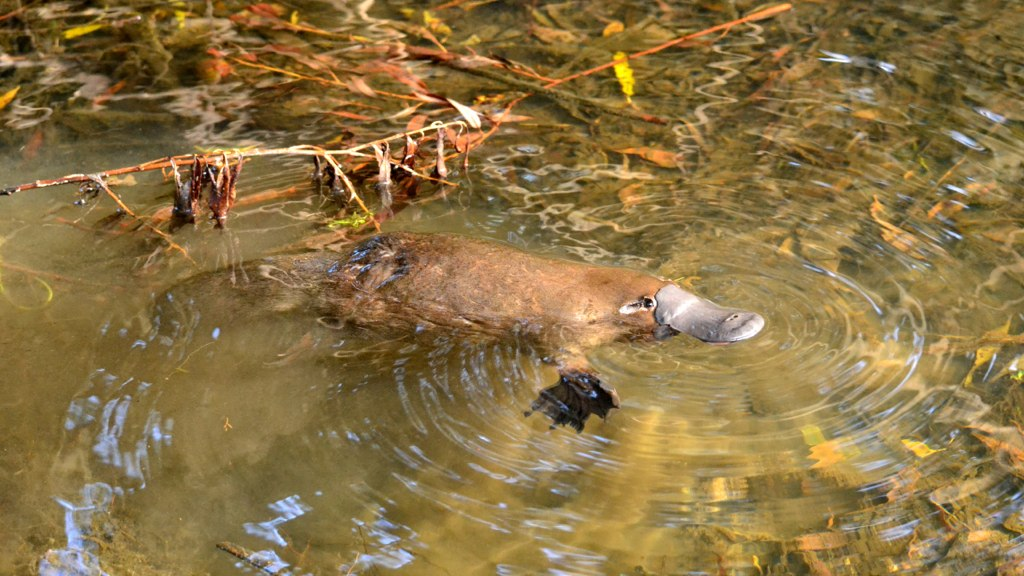
A platypus was included in the series because of its interesting appearance.

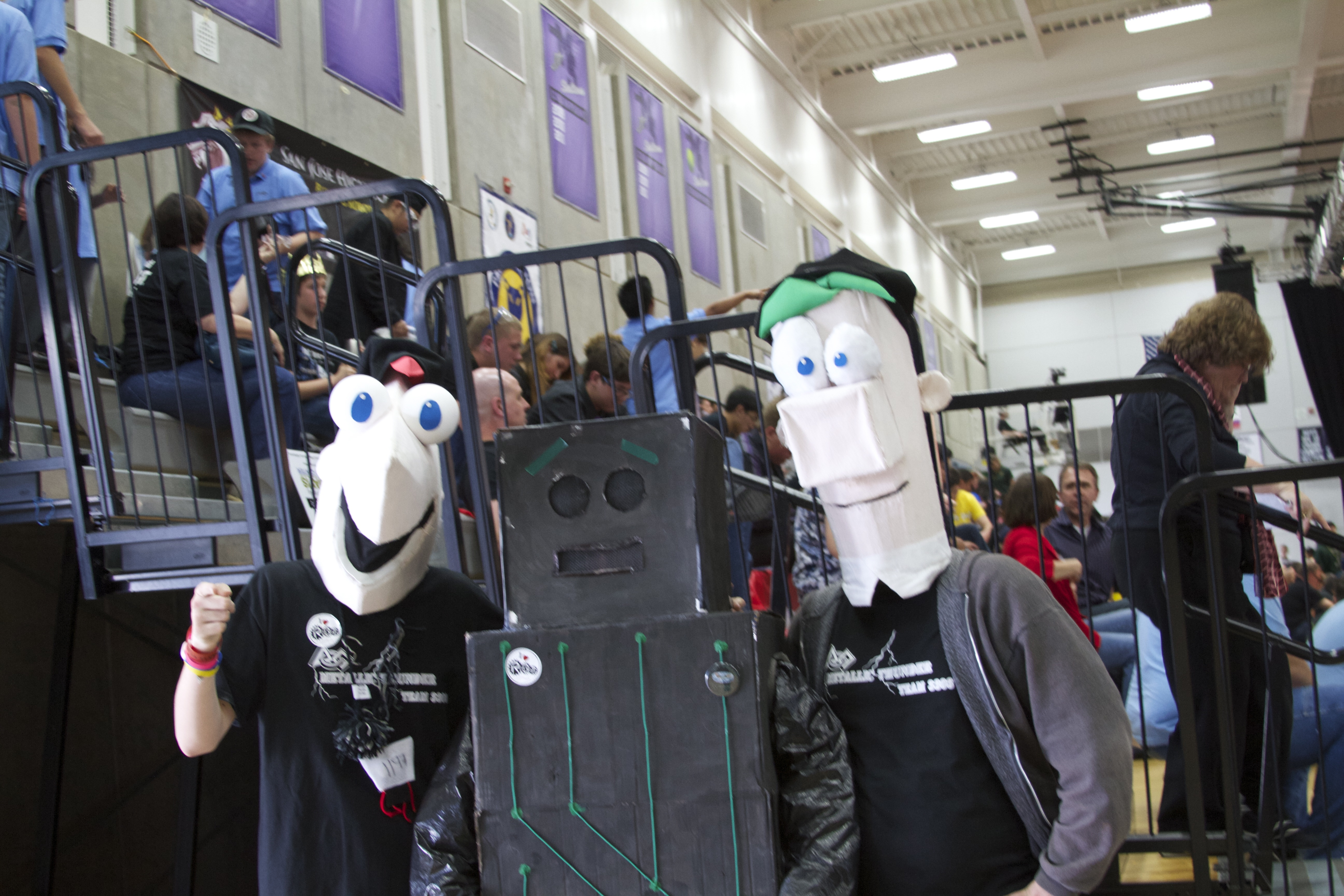
Phineas and Ferb cosplay

The series' main characters live in a blended family, a premise that the creators considered underused in children's programming and that reflected Marsh's own upbringing. Marsh considers explaining the family background "not important to the kids' lives. They are a great blended family and that's all we need to know". The choice of a platypus as the boys' pet was similarly inspired by media underuse, as well as the animal's striking appearance. Povenmire and Marsh wanted an uncommon species, an animal that kids could not "pick out at a pet store and beg [their parents] for". The platypus also gave them freedom to "make stuff up" since "no one knows very much about them", and allowed them to own that "mental real estate", so that if someone thinks of the word "platypus", they will associate it with Agent P, just as an ogre is now commonly associated with Shrek. Marsh called the characters "cool, edgy and clever without ... being mean-spirited". Animation director Rob Hughes is said to have noted that "in all the other shows every character is either stupid or a jerk, but there are no stupid characters or jerks in this one".

== Development ==
=== Early inspirations ===
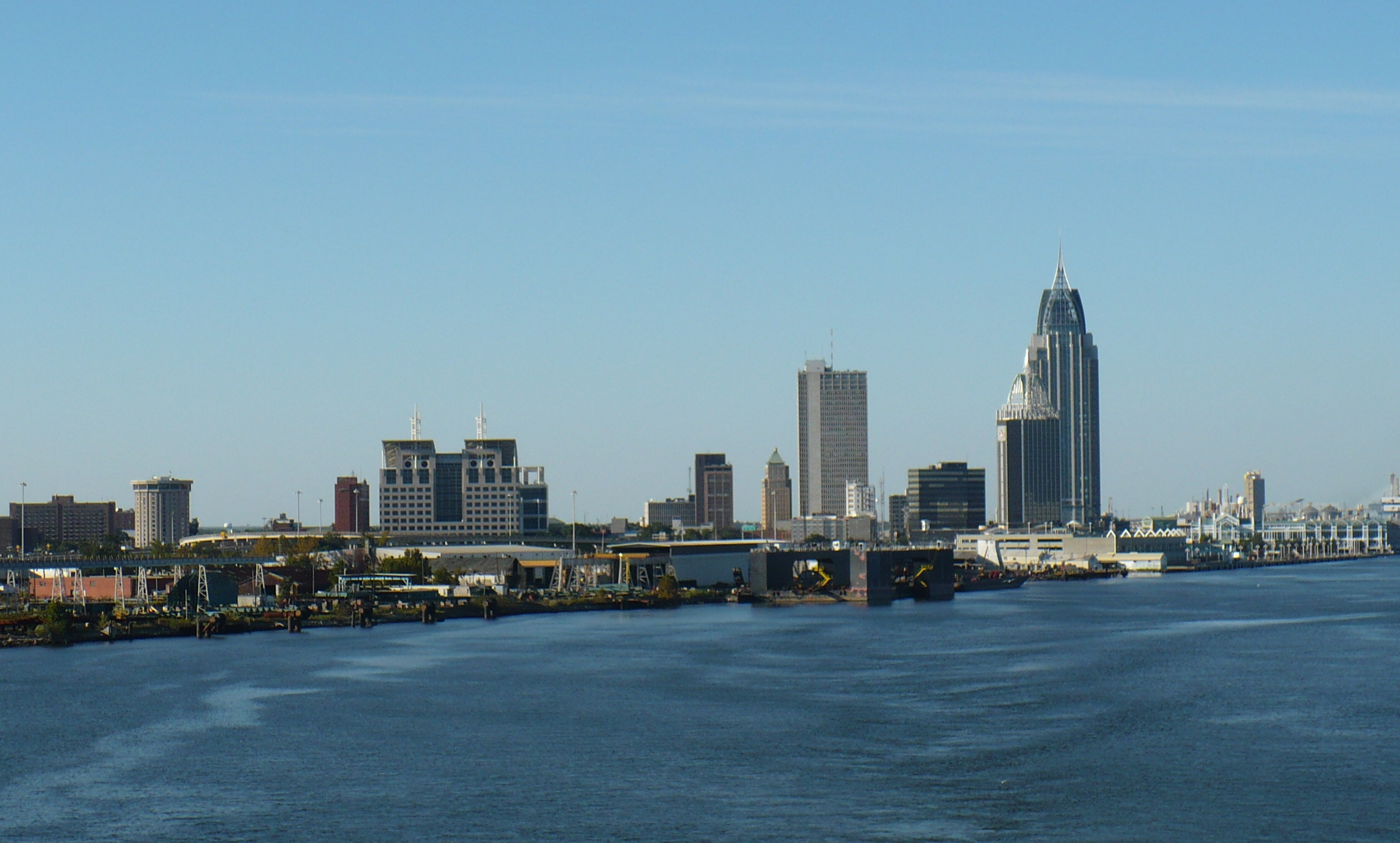
Povenmire drew inspiration for the show from his boyhood in Mobile, Alabama.

Dan Povenmire attributes the show's genesis to his childhood in Mobile, Alabama, where his mother told him to never waste a day of summer. To occupy himself, Povenmire undertook projects such as hole-digging and home movie-making. Povenmire recalled, "My mom let me drape black material all the way across one end of our living room to use as a space field. I would hang little models of spaceships for these little movies I made with a Super 8 camera". He was an artistic prodigy and displayed his very detailed drawings at art shows. Marsh was raised in a large, blended family. As with Povenmire, Marsh spent his summers exploring and taking part in various activities to have fun.

=== Conception ===
Drawn on butcher paper, this first drawing of Phineas began a rapid growth of characters and the outline of the artistic style.

While attending the University of Southern California, Povenmire started a daily comic strip called Life Is a Fish, and received money from the sale of its related merchandise. He eventually dropped out and started drawing people on street corners to make a living, until he was finally called by Tommy Chong to work on a short bit of animation in the film Far Out Man. Povenmire began to take up animation professionally, working on shows such as Teenage Mutant Ninja Turtles. Marsh had become a vice president of sales and marketing for a computer company until he "freaked out" and decided to quit. His friend helped him put together a portfolio and enter the animation business.

Povenmire and Marsh started working across from each other as layout artists on the Fox primetime series The Simpsons. The two bonded over mutual tastes in humor and music, becoming fast friends. They continued their working relationship as a writing team on the Nickelodeon series Rocko's Modern Life, where they conceived the idea for their own series. While eating dinner at a Wild Thyme restaurant in South Pasadena, Povenmire drew a quick sketch of a "triangle kid" on butcher paper. He tore it out and called Marsh that night to report, "Hey, I think we have our show". The triangle doodle sparked rapid development of characters and designs. Povenmire decided that his sketch "looked like a Phineas," and named Ferb after a friend who "owns more tools than anyone in the world". The creators based their character designs on angular shapes in homage to Tex Avery, an animator and director for MGM and Warner Bros., adding geometric shapes to the backgrounds for continuity.

=== Pitching and pickup ===
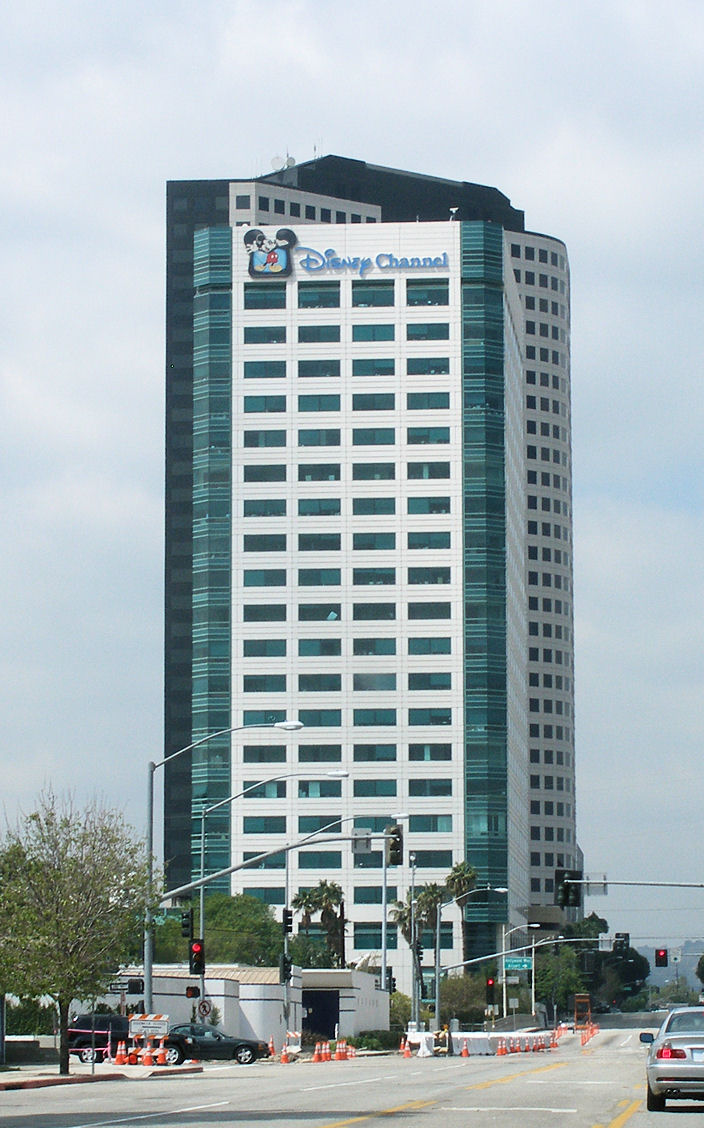
Disney Channel was the first network to give the series a chance, though initially declined when Dan Povenmire originally pitched it to them.

The writing duo's early attempts to pitch the show failed and, though they remained committed to the concept, Povenmire and Marsh began to drift apart after their work on Rocko. After working for storyboard artist on the primetime Fox series King of the Hill, Marsh moved to London and worked on shows including Postman Pat and Bounty Hamster. Meanwhile, Povenmire began working on Fox series Family Guy and the Nickelodeon series SpongeBob SquarePants, always carrying a Phineas and Ferb portfolio for convenient pitching to networks such as Nickelodeon, Cartoon Network and Fox Kids. The networks passed on the show, believing the series' premise was too complex to succeed.

Povenmire persisted and again pitched the series to Nickelodeon, where it was considered by high-level executives and given his experience with the network, but rejected once more as overly complicated. Then, after 16 years of trying, Povenmire landed a pitch with Disney. The network did not immediately accept the show but told Povenmire that it would keep the packet. Povenmire assumed that this had meant an end to negotiations, aware that the phrase usually "means they throw it in the trash later". Disney then surprised him by accepting. Povenmire said, "Disney was the first to say, 'Let's see if you can do it in 11 minutes.' We did it in the pilot and they said, 'Let's see if you can do it for 26 episodes.'"

Povenmire was initially worried that his work on Family Guy (an adult show known for its lowbrow humor) would concern Disney, which markets its fare primarily to families. However, Disney Channel senior vice president of original series Adam Bonnett was a Family Guy fan who appreciated Povenmire's connection to the show and received his pitch well.

In 2006, after the Disney Channel had accepted the show, Povenmire and Marsh turned their attention to the company's overseas executives. Instead of penning a normal script, the two drew out storyboards and played them in a reel. Povenmire voiced over the reel with his dialogue and added sound effects. This novel approach secured the executives' support.

== Production ==
=== Writing style ===
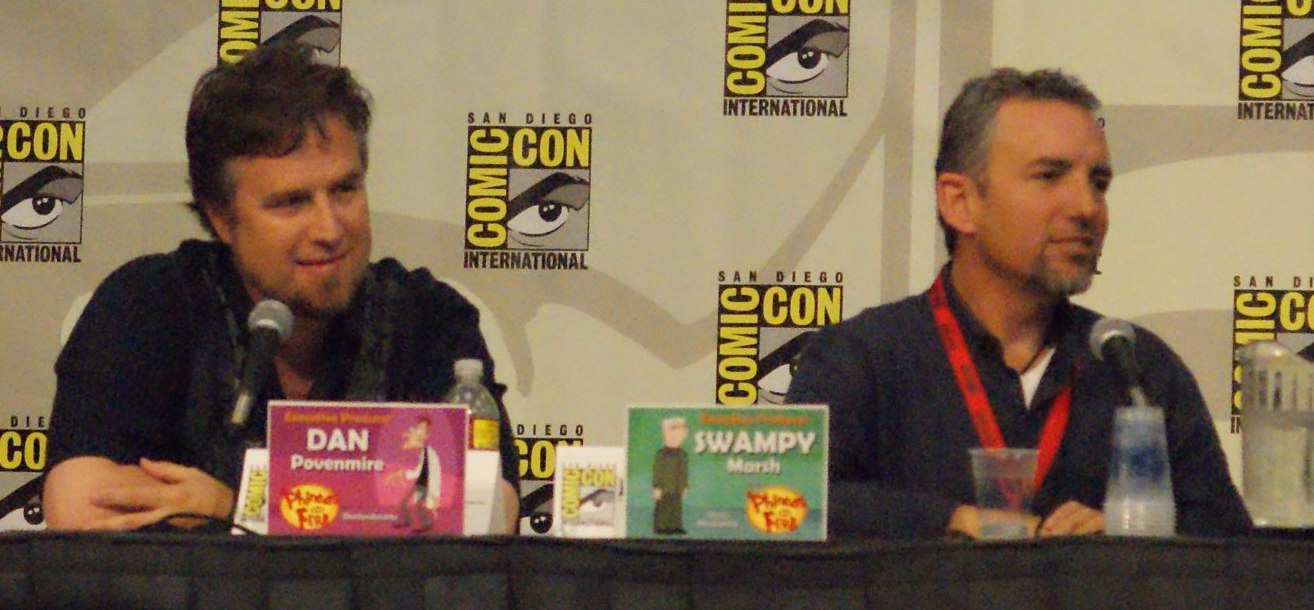
Phineas and Ferb co-creators Dan Povenmire and Jeff "Swampy" Marsh in 2009

The show uses four main writers to devise story ideas according to "strict guidelines", such as that the boys' schemes never appear to be "magical". Stories are reviewed at weekly sessions on a Monday, then simultaneously scripted and storyboarded. A very rough design is built before the storyboard, featuring little more than suggested scenes and dialogue, is drafted; the writers then gather for a "play-by-play" walkthrough of the storyboard in front of the whole crew, whose reactions to the jokes are assessed before rewrites are made. The writers also include running gags in every episode, which are generally lines spoken by characters. Almost every episode is split into two 11-minute segments. Dan Povenmire admitted that the "a-plot" of each episode, the one following Phineas and Ferb's inventions, is not actually a plot, but instead the setting, with the actual plot being Candace, Perry and Dr. Doofenshmirtz's story, "The essence of story is that the characters are changed by what happens to them. Nothing ever changes the boys, they never learn anything, there's never any obstacles they have to overcome, everything just works out for them".

Much of the series' humor relies on running gags used in almost every episode, with slight variation.

Certain aspects of the show's humor are aimed at adults, including its frequent pop-culture references. Co-creator Dan Povenmire, who had previously worked on Family Guy, sought to create a less raunchy show that would make similar use of comic timing, metahumor, humorous blank stares, wordplay and breaking the fourth wall. Povenmire describes the show as a combination of Family Guy and SpongeBob SquarePants. Co-creator Jeff "Swampy" Marsh has said that the show was not created exclusively for children; he simply did not exclude them as an audience.

For the original run, the show was storyboard-driven, but as of season 5, the show is now script-driven.

=== Visual aspects and animation ===
Rough Draft Studios in South Korea, Wang Film Productions in Taiwan, Morning Sun Animation and Synergy Animation in Shanghai and Hong Ying Animation, Hong Guang Animation in Suzhou and Snipple Animation in Philippines animate the series in 2D Animation using the software package Toon Boom. Povenmire would undertake the bulk of production direction, along with Zac Moncrief and Robert F. Hughes. The series adopts artistic features from animator Tex Avery, such as geometric shapes integrated into characters, objects, and backgrounds. Povenmire says of this inclusion, "There's a little bit of Tex Avery in there-he had that very graphic style [in his later cartoons]". Triangles are featured as an easter egg in the background of every episode, sometimes in trees or buildings.

The stages of development for a scene during the opening theme, from the original draft (top) to the final design (bottom). The top appears briefly in the Season 1 theme.

Bright colors are also a prominent element of the animation. Marsh elaborates, "The idea at the end of the day was candy. One of the things that I think works so well is that the characters are so bright and candy-colored and our backgrounds are a much more realistic depiction of the world: the soft green of the grass, the natural woods for the fence. In order for all the stuff that they do to work, their world needs to be grounded in reality". The designers sought to keep their characters visually simple so that kids "would easily be able to draw [them] themselves". Characters were also crafted to be recognizable from a distance, a technique that the creators say is based on Matt Groening's goal of making characters recognizable by silhouette.

=== Cast ===
Phineas and Ferb are voiced by Vincent Martella and Thomas Sangster (seasons 1–4) and David Errigo Jr. (season 5–present), respectively. Sangster was one of many British actors cast, as Marsh lived in the United Kingdom for seven years and developed a fondness for the British. The rest of the cast includes Ashley Tisdale as their sister Candace; Bobby Gaylor as Buford van Stomm, who has a tendency to bully but is kept distracted by being included in the adventures; Maulik Pancholy as Baljeet Tjinder, a very intelligent boy who avoids being Buford's main victim by their participation in the adventures; Dee Bradley Baker as Perry the Platypus; Caroline Rhea as Linda Flynn-Fletcher, Phineas and Candace's mother and stepmother to Ferb; Richard O'Brien as Lawrence Fletcher, Ferb's father and Phineas and Candace's stepfather; Jack McBrayer as Irving, who admires Phineas and Ferb, and is the creator of the Phineas and Ferb fansite; Kelly Hu as Candace's best friend Stacy; Povenmire as Dr. Doofenshmirtz; Marsh as Major Monogram; Olivia Olson as Dr. Doofenshmirtz's daughter Vanessa; Tyler Mann as Carl, Major Monogram's goofy super genius intern; Alyson Stoner as neighbor Isabella Garcia-Shapiro, a sweet Mexican/Jewish girl with a crush on Phineas; Mitchel Musso as Jeremy, Candace's crush and later her boyfriend; and Madison Pettis as Adyson Sweetwater, a member of Isabella's Fireside Girls troop.

The show's casting organization is responsible for selecting most of the voice actors and actresses, choosing actors such as Martella and Musso for major roles based on perceived popularity with target demographics. Povenmire and Marsh select guest stars, casting people that they "really want to work with". They also solicit guest roles from actors whom they feel would lend an interesting presence to the show.

Guest stars have included pop-culture figures such as Damian Lewis, boxer Evander Holyfield, film stars Cloris Leachman and Ben Stiller, and pop singer Kelly Clarkson. Povenmire and Marsh have also solicited Tim Curry and Barry Bostwick, stars of The Rocky Horror Picture Show, to make guest appearances, while Rocky Horror creator Richard O'Brien voices Lawrence Fletcher. Top Gear stars Jeremy Clarkson, Richard Hammond and James May guest-starred in a race-car themed episode as commentators. Other guest stars include Tina Fey, Seth MacFarlane, David Mitchell, Jaret Reddick, Clay Aiken, Chaka Khan and Kevin Smith.

=== Music ===
The series is known for its original songs that appear in almost every episode since the first season episode "Flop Starz". Disney's executives particularly enjoyed the episode's song "Gitchee, Gitchee Goo" and requested that a song appear in each subsequent episode. The music earned the series a total of four Emmy nominations: two Primetime Creative Arts nominations in 2008 (for the main title theme and for the song "I Ain't Got Rhythm" from the episode "Dude, We're Getting the Band Back Together") and two Daytime Creative Arts nominations in 2010 (for the song "Come Home Perry" from the episode "Oh, There You Are, Perry" and the original score by Danny Jacob).

Phineas and Ferb gave us a chance to write a song for every single episode, starting with the second episode, "Flop Starz". [...]
Every episode since then has a song in it. It's not always the characters singing onscreen – they don't break into song just to advance the plot. The music doesn't come out of nowhere, sometimes it's just a montage over action. We've done every genre known to man: ABBA, Broadway show tunes, 16th-century madrigals

— Dan Povenmire on the songs featured in every episode since "Flop Starz".

Phineas and Ferb follows structural conventions that Povenmire and Marsh developed while writing Rocko's Modern Life, whereby each episode features "a song or a musical number, plus a big action/chase scene". Both creators had musical backgrounds, as Povenmire performed rock and roll in his college years and Marsh's grandfather was the bandleader Les Brown.

The series' songs span many genres, from 16th-century madrigals to Broadway show tunes. Each is written in an intensive session during episode production; a concept, score and lyrics are developed quickly. Together, Marsh and Povenmire could "write a song about almost anything" in an hour. After they finished their songs, Povenmire and Marsh sang them over the answering machine of series composer Danny Jacob on Friday nights. By the following Monday, the song would be fully produced.

The opening theme song "Today Is Gonna Be a Great Day", performed by the American group Bowling for Soup, was nominated for an Emmy award in 2008. The creators originally wrote a slower number more in keeping with a "classic Disney song", but the network felt that changes were needed to especially appeal to children and commissioned the rock version that made the final cut.

A clip show titled "Phineas and Ferb's Musical Cliptastic Countdown" was broadcast as part of season two in October 2009. The show focuses on the series' music, featuring a viewer-voted list of its top ten songs. This clip show spawned a sequel, "Phineas and Ferb Musical Cliptastic Countdown Hosted by Kelly Osbourne", which aired on June 28, 2013. Osbourne hosted the special in live form, while Dr. Doofenshmirtz and Major Monogram appeared as animated.

=== Conclusion and revival ===
The series was renewed for a fourth season in August 2011, which was originally planned to be the final season; the hour-long finale "Last Day of Summer" aired on June 12, 2015. Povenmire and Marsh remained with the network and together created a new series, Milo Murphy's Law, which aired from 2016 to 2019. A revival of Phineas and Ferb, spanning 40 episodes across two seasons, was announced by Disney Branded Television in January 2023; by May of that year, Povenmire confirmed that the two seasons would be considered as the fifth and sixth of the series overall. The fifth season premiered on Disney Channel on June 5, 2025, and began streaming on Disney+ the next day. A soundtrack album with 13 songs from the new season was released on June 6, 2025. David Errigo Jr. replaces both Thomas Brodie-Sangster as Ferb and Mitchel Musso as Jeremy Johnson.

== Reception ==
=== Critical response ===
The show has received generally positive reviews. The New York Times commented favorably, describing the show as "Family Guy with an espionage subplot and a big dose of magical realism". It considered the pop-culture references ubiquitous "but [placed] with such skill that it seems smart, not cheap". Whitney Matheson wrote in her USA Today blog Pop Candy that the series was an achievement in children's programming, applauding the writing and calling the show "an animated version of Parker Lewis Can't Lose". Emily Ashby of Common Sense Media praised the show's humor and plot, giving it four out of five stars. The Seattle Times wrote that the story of the show was "valiant" and that the main characters are "young heroes".

Variety noted the show's appeal to all ages with its "sense of wit and irreverence". Similar reviews have emphasized the series' popularity with adults; Rebecca Wright of Elastic Pops wrote, "As an adult, I really enjoyed watching this Phineas and Ferb DVD, and I think it is one that the whole family can enjoy". Wright also called the series' "irreverent style" reminiscent of The Adventures of Rocky and Bullwinkle. Matt Blum of Wired has stated in reviews that he "can stand to watch just about anything with [his] kids, but [he] actually look[s] forward to watching Phineas and Ferb with them". Notable celebrities identified as fans of the series include Bob Eubanks, Anthony LaPaglia, Ben Stiller, Chaka Khan, Jeff Sullivan and Jake Gyllenhaal.

Among the negative reviews is one that charges the series with a lack of originality. Maxie Zeus of Toon Zone argues that the show is "derivative, but obviously so, and shorn of even the best features of what has been stolen". Zeus takes issue with the writing, feeling that certain jokes and conventions were "ripped-off" from other shows. Kevin McDonough of Sun Coast Today criticized the show for its plot complexity, constant action and "characters [that] can do just about anything". McDonough stated that "it's never clear whether P&F are intended to entertain children or are merely a reflection of grown-up animators engaged in a juvenile lark". Marylin Moss of The Hollywood Reporter described Phineas and Ferb as "Pretty mindless but kids of all ages might find a humorous moment in it". Moss called the plot lines redundant but praised the music styles and guest stars.

Alan Sepinwall and Matt Zoller Seitz gave a positive assessment in their 2016 book TV (The Book), stating that "In television, formula often seems to come from a lack of imagination. ... Phineas and Ferb though, managed at the same time to be wildly imaginative and slavishly formulaic, using its repetitive structure not as a crutch, but as a sturdy framework on which it could hang all kinds of fantastic new ideas". They further added that "the characters' awareness of that formula, and any deviations from it, quickly became one of the show's most fertile sources of humor".

=== Ratings ===
The first episode, "Rollercoaster", garnered a total of 10.8 million viewers when aired as a preview on August 17, 2007, holding onto more than half of the record-setting audience of its lead-in, High School Musical 2. When Phineas and Ferb officially debuted in February the next year, it proved to be cable's number-one watched animated series premiere by tweens. Throughout the quarter that followed, it peaked as the top-rated animated series for ages 6–10 and 9–14, also becoming the number-three animated series on cable television for viewers aged 6–10. By the time the second season was announced in May 2008, the series had become a top-rated program in the 6–11 and 9–14 age groups.

The Disney Channel airing of "Phineas and Ferb Get Busted!" was watched by 3.7 million viewers. The episodes "Perry Lays an Egg" and "Gaming the System" achieved the most views by ages 6–11 and 9–14 of any channel in that night's time slot. This achievement made the series the number-one animated telecast that week for its target demographics. On June 7, 2009, Disney announced that the show had become the number-one primetime animated show for the 6–10 and 9–14 groups.

The premiere of "Phineas and Ferb Christmas Vacation" garnered 2.62 million viewers during its debut on Disney XD, the most watched telecast in the channel's history (including Toon Disney) and the number-three program of the night across all demographics. It received 5.2 million viewers for its debut on Disney Channel and was the highest-rated episode of the series to date and fifth-highest for the week.

The premiere of "Phineas and Ferb: Summer Belongs to You!" garnered 3.862 million viewers and was watched by 22% of children 2–11, 13% of teens, 5% of households and 3% of adults 18–49, also ranking as the number-one program for that night and as 25th for the week. On Disney XD, the episode ranked among the channel's top three telecasts of the year with 1.32 million viewers, including 365,000 among boys 6–11, with a 2.9 rating. The hour-long telecast on August 2, 2010, was the series' number-two telecast of all time on Disney XD in total viewers, behind only December 2009's "Phineas and Ferb Christmas Vacation".

=== Awards and nominations ===
List of awards and nominations received by Phineas and Ferb
Award	Year	Recipient(s) and nominee(s)	Category	Result	Ref.
Annie Awards	2009	Phineas and Ferb	Best Animated Television Program	Nominated	
Annie Awards	2010	"Nerds of a Feather"	Best Writing in a Television Production	Nominated	
Annie Awards	2021	Ashley Tisdale (for Phineas and Ferb the Movie: Candace Against the Universe)	Outstanding Achievement for Voice Acting in an Animated Television / Broadcast Production	Nominated	
British Academy Children's Awards	2008	Phineas and Ferb	Best International	Nominated	
British Academy Children's Awards	2009	Phineas and Ferb	Best International	Nominated	
British Academy Children's Awards	2010	Phineas and Ferb	Best International	Nominated	
British Academy Children's Awards	2011	Phineas and Ferb	Best International	Nominated	
British Academy Children's Awards	2012	Phineas and Ferb	Best International	Nominated	
British Academy Children's Awards	2014	Phineas and Ferb	BAFTA Kids' Vote: Television	Nominated	
Critics' Choice Television Awards	2013	Phineas and Ferb	Best Animated Series	Nominated	
Critics' Choice Television Awards	2014	Phineas and Ferb	Best Animated Series	Nominated	
Daytime Emmy Awards	2010	Phineas and Ferb	Outstanding Writing in Animation	Won^{B}	
Daytime Emmy Awards	2010	"Come Home Perry"	Outstanding Original Song – Children's and Animation	Nominated	
Daytime Emmy Awards	2010	Danny Jacob	Outstanding Achievement in Music Direction and Composition	Nominated	
Daytime Emmy Awards	2010	Robert Poole II, Robbi Smith, and Roy Braverman	Outstanding Achievement in Sound Editing – Live Action and Animation	Nominated	
Daytime Emmy Awards	2015	"Phineas and Ferb Save Summer"	Outstanding Special Class Animated Program	Nominated	
Daytime Emmy Awards	2021	Dan Povenmire, Jeff "Swampy" Marsh, Jon Colton Barry, Jim Bernstein, Joshua Pruett, Kate Kondell, Jeffrey M. Howard and Bob Bowen (for Phineas and Ferb the Movie: Candace Against the Universe)	Outstanding Writing Team for a Daytime Animated Program	Won	
Daytime Emmy Awards	2021	"Such a Beautiful Day"	Outstanding Original Song for a Preschool, Children's or Animated Program	Nominated	
Nickelodeon Kids' Choice Awards (Mexico)	2011	Phineas and Ferb	Favorite Cartoon	Won	
Nickelodeon Kids' Choice Awards (United States)	2009	Phineas and Ferb	Favorite Cartoon	Nominated	
Nickelodeon Kids' Choice Awards (United States)	2010	Phineas and Ferb	Favorite Cartoon	Nominated	
Nickelodeon Kids' Choice Awards (United States)	2011	Phineas and Ferb	Favorite Cartoon	Nominated	
Nickelodeon Kids' Choice Awards (United States)	2012	Phineas and Ferb	Favorite Cartoon	Nominated	
Nickelodeon Kids' Choice Awards (United States)	2013	Phineas and Ferb	Favorite Cartoon	Nominated	
Nickelodeon Kids' Choice Awards (United States)	2014	Phineas and Ferb	Favorite Cartoon	Nominated	
Nickelodeon Kids' Choice Awards (United States)	2015	Phineas and Ferb	Favorite Cartoon	Nominated	
Nickelodeon Kids' Choice Awards (United States)	2016	Phineas and Ferb	Favorite Cartoon	Nominated	
Nickelodeon Kids' Choice Awards (United States)	2021	Phineas and Ferb the Movie: Candace Against the Universe	Favorite Animated Movie	Nominated	
Nickelodeon Kids' Choice Awards (United States)	2026	Phineas and Ferb	Favorite Cartoon	Pending	
Primetime Emmy Awards	2008	"Today is Gonna Be a Great Day"	Outstanding Main Title Theme Music	Nominated	
Primetime Emmy Awards	2008	"I Ain't Got Rhythm"	Outstanding Original Music and Lyrics	Nominated	
Primetime Emmy Awards	2009	"The Monster of Phineas-n-Ferbenstein"	Outstanding Short Form Animated Program	Nominated^{A}	
Primetime Emmy Awards	2011	Jill Daniels (for "Wizard of Odd")	Outstanding Individual Achievement in Animation	Won	
Primetime Emmy Awards	2011	Brian Woods (for "Wizard of Odd")	Outstanding Individual Achievement in Animation	Won	
Primetime Emmy Awards	2012	Jill Daniels (for "Doof Dynasty")	Outstanding Individual Achievement in Animation	Won	
Primetime Emmy Awards	2012	Dan Povenmire (for Phineas and Ferb the Movie: Across the 2nd Dimension)	Outstanding Voice-Over Performance	Nominated	
Primetime Emmy Awards	2012	"The Doonkleberry Imperative"	Outstanding Short Form Animated Program	Nominated	
Primetime Emmy Awards	2014	"Thanks But No Thanks"	Outstanding Short Form Animated Program	Nominated	
Primetime Emmy Awards	2016	"Last Day of Summer"	Outstanding Animated Program	Nominated	
Pulcinella Awards	2009	Phineas and Ferb	Best TV Series for Kids	Won	
Pulcinella Awards	2009	Phineas and Ferb	Special Mention: Best Flash Animation	Won	
TCA Awards	2012	Phineas and Ferb	Outstanding Achievement in Youth Programming	Nominated	
TCA Awards	2026	Phineas and Ferb	Outstanding Achievement in Family Programming	Nominated	

1.^A The Academy of Television Arts & Sciences announced that it would not present the award to either nominee in the category. As an area award, nominees had to garner 50% approval to win the award. None of the nominees met the benchmark, and no award was given.
2.^B Shared with Back at the Barnyard.

== Other media ==
=== Films ===
On March 3, 2010, a Disney press release announced a made-for-television film based on the series, entitled Phineas and Ferb the Movie: Across the 2nd Dimension, which aired on the Disney Channel on August 5, 2011. The film depicts Phineas and Ferb accidentally helping Dr. Doofenshmirtz with an invention that takes them to a parallel dimension, where Perry reveals his double life as a secret agent to them, and, to save their friends from a devious alternative Dr. Doofenshmirtz, they team up with their alternate-dimension selves to stop him.

In January 2011, Gary Marsh, the president of Disney Channels Worldwide announced that early development on a theatrical feature film adaptation of Phineas and Ferb had commenced. Sean Bailey, head of production at Walt Disney Pictures, led the development, which would combine live-action and animation. By July, Povenmire and Marsh were in the early stages of writing the film's script; Michael Arndt, the writer of Little Miss Sunshine and Toy Story 3, was hired to write a further draft of the screenplay. The film was to be produced by Mandeville Films, and was originally scheduled for release on July 26, 2013. In October 2012, Disney moved the release date to 2014, and in August 2013, the film was removed from its schedule.

On April 11, 2019, it was announced that a film, titled Phineas and Ferb the Movie: Candace Against the Universe, would be released on Disney+ within a year of its launch; it would eventually premiere on August 28, 2020. Most of the series' cast reprised their roles, with the exception of Thomas Sangster as Ferb, who was replaced by David Errigo Jr., who had previously voiced Ferb on Milo Murphy's Law. According to writer Jim Bernstein, the film is unrelated to the previously shelved theatrical Phineas and Ferb film.

On January 15, 2026, it was announced that a third Phineas and Ferb movie had been greenlit, with the series' main cast all reprising their roles.

=== Crossovers and short series ===
Disney produced Take Two with Phineas and Ferb, a live-action talk show in which the two titular characters (as cartoons) interviewed celebrities, similar to Space Ghost Coast to Coast. It aired from December 2010 to November 25, 2011 as a two-minute talk-show format featuring real-life celebrities. Several other local guests have appeared in countries outside the United States.

Dr. Heinz Doofenshmirtz, pitched his invention on the 2013 season finale of Shark Tank in a cross-over episode.

"Phineas and Ferb: Mission Marvel", a crossover episode with characters from Marvel Entertainment, aired in August 2013 as 22nd episode of the fourth season. It features Marvel Comics superheroes Iron Man, Spider-Man, the Hulk and Thor and the villains the Red Skull, Whiplash, Venom and M.O.D.O.K. It is the first major animated crossover between Marvel and Disney since the acquisition of Marvel Entertainment by Disney in 2009.

"Phineas and Ferb: Star Wars", a crossover episode with Star Wars, aired on July 26, 2014 as the 41st episode of the fourth season, taking place as a parodical sidebar to the events of Episode IV – A New Hope (1977).

Povenmire had stated that he would like to do a crossover with his and Marsh's follow-up show, Milo Murphy's Law, which takes place in the same universe as Phineas and Ferb. The crossover eventually took place in Milo Murphy's Law's second season premiere, titled "The Phineas and Ferb Effect". The entire Phineas and Ferb cast reprised their roles for the episode, with the exception of Thomas Sangster, the original voice of Ferb, who was instead voiced by David Errigo, Jr. Before the crossover aired, Dr. Heinz Doofenshmirtz cameoed at the end of the episode "Fungus Among Us"; following the crossover, the characters Dr. Doofenshmirtz, Perry, Major Monogram and Carl joined the cast of Milo Murphy's Law in a recurring capacity.

In August 2022, Povenmire expressed interest in a crossover between Hamster & Gretel, Phineas and Ferb, and Milo Murphy’s Law.

In April 2025, two further short-form series spin-offs were announced, The first spin-off, Cartoonified with Phineas and Ferb has the two titular characters interview celebrities, similarly to Take Two with Phineas and Ferb, albeit with the celebrities animated and taking part in the boys' adventures. The second spin-off, Agent P, Under C follows Agent P as he infiltrates rival agency the Alliance of Nefarious Animals That Has an Exceptionally Memorable Acronym (A.N.A.T.H.E.M.A.).

On June 6, 2026, several Phineas and Ferb shorts were released as part of a vertical short-series, Locker Diaries, centered around the titular characters and their friends' adventures, albeit at school, viewed from the inside of school lockers.

=== Fireside Girls scrapped spinoff series ===
On June 22, 2010, the co-creators of this series revealed that they wish to make a spin-off series about Isabella and the Fireside Girls. However, Povenmire confirmed in a 2020 interview that the show had been scrapped.

=== Video games ===
In 2009, Disney licensed a Nintendo DS video game titled Phineas and Ferb. The game's story follows the title characters as they try to build a roller coaster. The player controls Phineas, Ferb and occasionally Perry the Platypus. Phineas scavenges for spare parts for the roller coaster while Ferb fixes various objects around town, gaining access to new areas as a result. Ferb can also construct new parts of the coaster and its vehicle-themed carts. Each activity features a short mini-game. The game was well-received and garners a 76.67% on GameRankings. A sequel entitled Phineas and Ferb: Ride Again was released on September 14, 2010. Another game, Phineas and Ferb: Across the 2nd Dimension, was released for the Wii and PlayStation 3 platforms in 2011.

In 2012, Walt Disney World opened an interactive game based on the series at Epcot, titled Agent P's World Showcase Adventure, which centered around Perry and Dr. Doofenshmirtz, based on the previous attraction Kim Possible World Showcase Adventure.

Also in 2012, Disney Mobile launched a mobile game titled Where's My Perry? for iOS and Android. It was based on Disney's popular Where's My Water? game, using similar physics.

In 2013, Disney commissioned Majesco to create Phineas and Ferb: Quest for Cool Stuff, which was released for the Xbox 360, Wii U, Wii, Nintendo 3DS and Nintendo DS platforms.

Phineas and Agent P appear as playable characters in all the video games of the Disney Infinity series. As with the other playable characters in the games, tie-in figures for them were also released.

=== Live tour ===
Phineas and Ferb: The Best LIVE Tour Ever was a touring two-act adaptation of the TV show. A projection system played video in the same style as the TV show on the rear of the stage; the characters were first introduced there in their cartoon forms, but then used a backyard slide that continued into a physical slide, out of which the live cast members emerged into the real world. The performers wore prosthetics to make their characters resemble their cartoon counterparts—mostly head pieces, but a full body suit in the cases of Buford and Perry. The 2011–2012 season of the tour began on August 21, 2011, in Lakeland, Florida and ended on April 22, 2012, in East Rutherford, New Jersey. The 2012–2013 season began on August 23, 2012, in Wheeling, West Virginia and ran until February 18, 2013, in Chattanooga, Tennessee.

=== Merchandise ===
Disney has licensed a number of products from the show, including figures and plush toys of characters Perry, Ferb, Phineas and Candace. As with the other playable characters in the Disney Infinity games, tie-in figures for Phineas and Agent P were also released. Disney released several T-shirts for the show and launched a "Make your own T-shirt" program on its website.

Two Season 1 DVDs, entitled The Fast and the Phineas and The Daze of Summer, have been released; the discs include episodes never previously broadcast in the U.S. A third DVD was released on October 5, 2010, called A Very Perry Christmas. Some reviewers were displeased that the discs covered selected episodes rather than the entire series, but noted that Disney does not generally release full-season DVD sets. Authors have novelized several episodes.
