= Wizards of Waverly Place: Spellbound =

2010 video game

- North American cover art
- Developer: Sarbakan
- Publisher: Disney Interactive Studios
- Platform: Nintendo DS
- Release: NA: November 16, 2010; EU: March 25, 2011; AU: March 31, 2011
- Genre: Adventure
- Modes: Single-player, multiplayer

Wizards of Waverly Place: Spellbound is a video game published by Disney Interactive Studios for the Nintendo DS, and released on November 16, 2010. The game is based on the popular Disney Channel show, Wizards of Waverly Place. It is a follow-up to the first game of the same title, developed by Black Lantern Studios, which was released in 2009.

== Summary ==
Like the show, the game focuses on the adventures of Alex, Max, and Justin Russo, teenage siblings who happen to be wizards. The game is split into several smaller episodes that tie into an overarching plot involving Alex making a dress for a wizardry fashion show.

The game consists of both point-and-click and action-adventure gameplay. In each episode, the kids learn a new spell, which is then used to solve a series of area-based puzzles. As new spells are unlocked, the kids gain new ways to solve the puzzles, that become more complicated as the game progresses. Between puzzle-based areas, the kids need to complete action-based areas, which are short mini games. Both styles of play merge in a series of challenging games unlocked by completing levels. Upon completing challenges and accomplishing most in-game tasks, players unlock DGamer outfits for their DGamer character.

The game's main "life" mechanic is an observation meter. In the television series, the Russo kids are not allowed to use magic while unsupervised. In the game, this is represented as a meter with an attached eye icon. Once the meter fills, the kids are busted and must replay the sequence from the beginning.

The game features a scaled-down, almost "chibi" art-style, and contains several locations from the show, including the Loft and Waverly Sub Station Shop. Sections of the game are shown with the same "dancing" transitions as in the show, and features downgraded synthesized versions of music from the series.
