= Club Penguin (franchise) =

Video game franchise

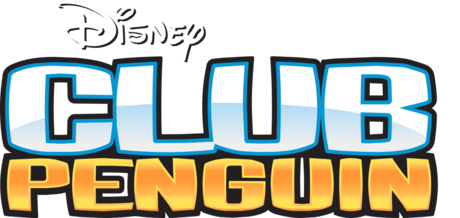
- Logo of the original Club Penguin, used from 2012 to 2017
- Created by: Lance Priebe
- Original work: Club Penguin (2005–2017)
- Owners: New Horizons Interactive (2005–2007); Disney Canada Inc. (Disney) (2007–2018)
- Years: 2005–2018

Print publications
- Book(s): See Books section

Films and television
- Television special(s): We Wish You a Merry Walrus (2014); Club Penguin: Monster Beach Party (2015); Club Penguin: Halloween Panic! (2015)

Games
- Video game(s): Main games: Club Penguin (2005–2017); Club Penguin Island (2017–2018); Console games: Club Penguin: Elite Penguin Force (2008); Club Penguin: Elite Penguin Force – Herbert's Revenge (2010); Club Penguin: Game Day! (2010)

Official website
- Club Penguin; Club Penguin Island

Club Penguin is a dormant media franchise that was created in 2005 with the release of the online massively multiplayer online game (MMO) Club Penguin, later bought out by Disney. Club Penguin inspired a variety of console video games, books, and television specials. Following the game's discontinuation in March 2017, the game was replaced by a successor, Club Penguin Island (2017), which was released on mobile and later desktop. The successor was closed in late 2018, marking the end of the franchise.

Despite being officially dormant, several unofficial media has been made after the closure of the original game and Club Penguin Island, the most notable being Club Penguin Rewritten, a recreation of the original game which ran from 2017 to 2022.

== Main video games ==
=== Club Penguin (2005–2017) ===
Club Penguin was a massively multiplayer online game (MMO) that ran from 2005 to 2017, created by New Horizon Interactive (later known as Disney Canada Inc. after the game's acquisition by Disney).

=== Club Penguin Island (2017–2018) ===
As of mid-November 2016, Disney Interactive advertised a related but separate mobile gaming environment named Club Penguin Island, to become available in select languages and areas in 2017. Pre-registration was available for reserving player names. On January 30, 2017, it was announced that the original game would be discontinued on March 29, 2017. The game was released worldwide for mobile devices on March 30, 2017, the same day Club Penguin shut down. On November 30, 2017, the game was released on Windows and macOS. On September 27, 2018, Disney confirmed the imminent discontinuation of Club Penguin Island in a letter obtained by the website Kotaku, and in a blog post.

== Console video games ==
The Club Penguin video game series is a series of party games for the Wii and Nintendo DS based on Disney's popular massively multiplayer online game, Club Penguin. They are published by Disney Interactive Studios.

=== Nintendo DS ===
==== Club Penguin: Elite Penguin Force (2008) ====
Club Penguin: Elite Penguin Force was released in the US on November 25, 2008, in Europe on March 13, 2009, and in Australia on April 16, 2009. In September 2009, a Collector's Edition was released and included upgrades to the game and extra features. Club Penguin: Elite Penguin Force was released by Disney for the Nintendo DS on November 25, 2008. As members of the "Elite Penguin Force", players solved mysteries around Club Penguin. The game features mini-games from Club Penguin; coins earned by the mini-games could be transferred to the player's Club Penguin account.

==== Club Penguin: Elite Penguin Force – Herbert's Revenge (2010) ====
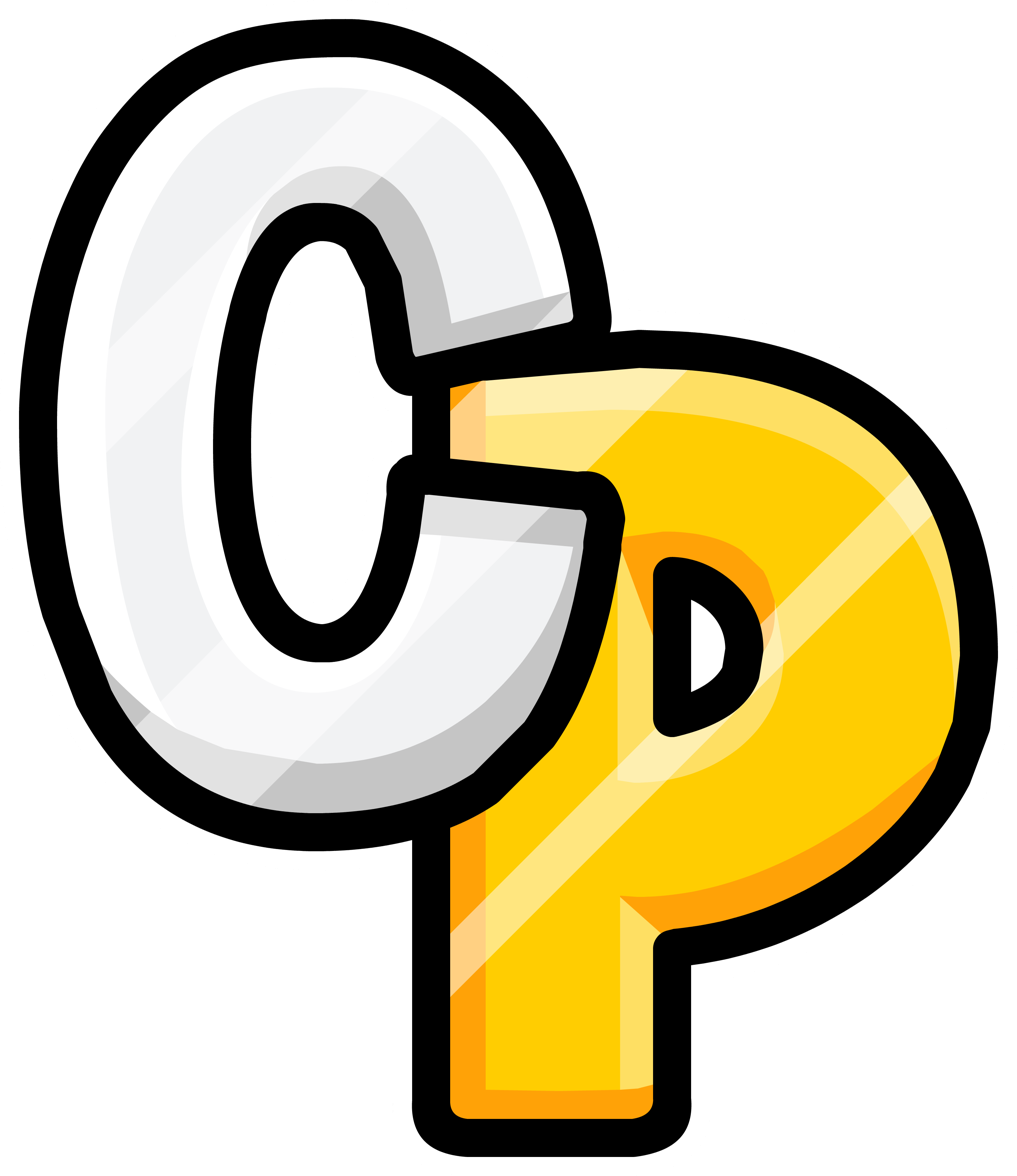
Club Penguin CP wordmark

Club Penguin: Elite Penguin Force – Herbert's Revenge is a sequel to Club Penguin: Elite Penguin Force. The game starts off as the player and former members of the PSA are recruited to be part of the EPF. They are put in 6 different PSA missions, starting with Secret of the Fur, and 4 game-exclusive EPF missions featuring the main antagonist, Herbert the bear. Herbert's Revenge was announced on February 13, 2010, with a release of May 2010. Previously established character Dot the Disguise Gal features as a character in the game.

The Sports Shop (where the PSA HQ was formerly located) was changed to the 'Everyday Phoning Facility.' Players who were PSA agents and had taken 'the test' became agents of the EPF. Players who were already EPF agents (and were able to access the EPF Command Room through the wardrobe in the PSA HQ) no longer had any benefits whereas members who had entered a code from 'Herbert's Revenge' can call the elite puffle 'Flare' from the game by using the puffle whistle button on the EPF phone, and performed a special action when they sit or dance with the puffle, although they were able to get more puffles through the EPF phone.

=== Wii ===
==== Club Penguin: Game Day! (2010) ====
In 2010, Disney Interactive Studios announced plans for Club Penguin: Game Day!, a game for the Wii. It was reported that the game was released on September 21, 2010, in the U.S. Reportedly, the game would involve players working as a team trying to earn sections of land on an island, with the objective being to conquer the island. The game was based around several interactive games, some of which were 3D versions of games then played and games which appeared only at the Fall Fair (such as Puffle Paddle) in Club Penguin. Players were able to customize their penguins and choose their team (blue, red, yellow, or green). Any points earned in the Wii game could be synchronized with Club Penguin.

Club Penguin: Game Day! was developed by Artoon and released in September 2010. The game can be played by up to 4 people at once. There is also a single player mode. Club Penguin: Game Day! and its rating were first found on the ESRB site in April 2010, but it was taken down before May since the game was not announced at that time. It then was officially announced on June 10, 2010. In the game, players can create and customize a 3D penguin and compete in a variety of challenges. Each time players beat a challenge, they conquer some territory on the island. The ultimate goal for players is to conquer as much territory as possible. Once, players could transfer coins, items, and stamps to their Club Penguin account. However, this is no longer working since May 20, 2014 at 10.30 PM EST when Nintendo discontinued the Wi-Fi support with the Nintendo DS and Wii.

== Television specials ==
British company Factory produced three TV specials based on the game, a Christmas TV special, titled We Wish You a Merry Walrus, aired on Disney Channel in the UK on December 17, 2014. A sequel to We Wish You a Merry Walrus, a summer special titled Club Penguin: Monster Beach Party was also produced and premiered on Disney Channel in the UK on August 10, 2015. A Halloween special based on the game, Club Penguin: Halloween Panic!, premiered on Disney Channel UK on October 25, 2015.

== Merchandise ==
=== Books ===
Cardback to Club Penguin CCG

In honor of Club Penguin's third anniversary in 2008, Club Penguin released books that were published under the Snowball Press name. Outside of the virtual world, such books were published by Grosset & Dunlap and included guidebooks for the game as well as "choose-your-own-adventure"-style books. The series includes The Ultimate Official Guide to Club Penguin Volume 1 by Ladybird Books, Stowaway! Adventures at Sea by Tracey West, Stuck on Puffles by Ladybird Books, and Waddle Lot of Laughs by Rebecca McCarthy.

On February 3, 2018, Club Penguin Island released an e-book titled Wish Upon a Squid which could be read via the Disney Story Central app. Players were given a code to get the eBook for free. The code expired on March 31, 2018. The book followed the story about a determined penguin named Leedah and her journey across the island to discover her special talent.

=== Collectible card game ===
A collectible card game was released by Topps. The cards feature characters and player penguins from Club Penguin, the latter intended to be customized with special stickers of clothing items. The card game's rules are the same as the mini-game Cardjitsu from Club Penguin.

== Unofficial media ==
Following the closure of Club Penguin, an identical recreation of Club Penguin entitled Club Penguin Rewritten (2017–2022) proceeded to accumulate over 11 million registered users over the following five years, before monetising (allowing for advertisers) over the course of the COVID-19 pandemic lockdowns and consequently being shut down by the City of London Police in compliance with a copyright investigation request from Disney. Another recreation, New Club Penguin, was released in 2020, having amassed 2 million players over four years.

== Awards and nominations ==
Year	Award	Title	Recipient	Result	Ref.
2008	Web Marketing Association Entertainment Standard of Excellence		Club Penguin	Won	
2008	Web Marketing Association Game Site Standard of Excellence		Club Penguin	Won	
2008	2008 Webby Awards, Youth Category		Club Penguin	Nominated	
2009	2009 Webby Awards, Games Category		Club Penguin	Won	
2010	Children's BAFTA Award	Kids Vote	Club Penguin	Won	
2011	Children's BAFTA Award	Kids Vote	Club Penguin	Nominated	
2012	Children's BAFTA Award	Kids Vote	Club Penguin	Nominated	
2013	Children's BAFTA Award	Kids Vote	Club Penguin	Nominated	
2018	Game Audio Network Guild Award	Best Music in a Casual/Social Game	Club Penguin Island	Nominated	
