= Fall Line Studios =

Video game studio

- Company type: Subsidiary
- Industry: Video games
- Founded: 2006; 20 years ago
- Defunct: 2009; 17 years ago
- Fate: Merged into Avalanche Software
- Successor: Avalanche Software
- Headquarters: Salt Lake City, Utah, United States
- Number of employees: 2
- Parent: Disney Interactive Studios

Fall Line Studios was an American video game developer owned by Disney Interactive Studios. It was based in Salt Lake City, Utah.

It was dedicated to develop games based on Disney characters, television shows, and entertainment franchises exclusively for Nintendo consoles such as the Nintendo DS and Wii systems, in addition to original titles. The company also helped develop Disney's DGamer network, utilized in various Nintendo DS games.

The studio was merged into Avalanche Software in 2009.

== Video games ==
- The Chronicles of Narnia: Prince Caspian
- Hannah Montana: Music Jam (co-developed with Gorilla Systems Corp.)
- Hannah Montana: Pop Star Exclusive (co-developer with EA Canada)
- Ultimate Band
