= Wizards of Waverly Place (video game) =

2009 video game

- Developer: Black Lantern Studios
- Publisher: Disney Interactive Studios
- Platform: Nintendo DS
- Release: NA: August 25, 2009; EU: August 28, 2009; AU: September 21, 2009
- Genre: Adventure
- Modes: Single-player, multiplayer

Wizards of Waverly Place is a video game developed by Black Lantern Studios and published by Disney Interactive Studios for the Nintendo DS. The video game is based on the Disney Channel Original Series Wizards of Waverly Place. It was released in August 2009 in America and Europe and in Australia on September 21.

== Summary ==
The game's plot involves Alex buying a bracelet that is only meant for adult wizards and starts freezing people. The game is quest-based and involves the player traversing through several locations from the television series. Alex Russo is the initial playable character, while her brothers Max and Justin later become playable. Players cast spells by drawing specific shapes on the Nintendo DS' touchscreen. Players can also unlock a variety of DGamer outfits for their DGamer character as they progress through the game. The game also contains a variety of minigames, two of which can be played through multiplayer via single-card download play.

== Sequel ==
A second video game titled Wizards of Waverly Place: Spellbound was released on November 16, 2010. The game's story consists of Alex finding her missing dress for a wizardry fashion show.
