= The Chronicles of Narnia: The Lion, the Witch and the Wardrobe (video game) =

2005 video game

- PAL region cover art for PlayStation 2
- Developers: Traveller's Tales; Amaze Entertainment (DS, GBA)
- Publisher: Buena Vista Games
- Platforms: Game Boy Advance; GameCube; Nintendo DS; PlayStation 2; Windows; Xbox
- Release: NA: November 15, 2005; PAL: November 25, 2005; PAL: March 31, 2006 (GC, Xbox)
- Genre: Action-adventure
- Modes: Single-player, multiplayer

The Chronicles of Narnia: The Lion, the Witch and the Wardrobe is an action-adventure game released in 2005 by Traveller's Tales (console version) and Amaze Entertainment (handheld version). The game is based on the novel-adapted movie of the same name. It was released in November before the movie for most major consoles including the GameCube, PC, Xbox, PlayStation 2, Nintendo DS, and Game Boy Advance, A version for the PlayStation Portable was planned, but was cancelled. Also in 2005, a role-playing game, a strategy game and a chess game (all with identical names) were released for wireless phone systems by Disney Mobile. A significant feature has William Moseley, Skandar Keynes, Anna Popplewell, Georgie Henley, Elizabeth Hawthorne, and Jim Broadbent reprising their roles from the film.

== Gameplay ==
=== Console versions ===
The objective of The Lion, the Witch and the Wardrobe is to guide the four Pevensie children—Peter, Susan, Edmund and Lucy—through the enchanted, wintery land of Narnia as they fight to end the rule of the wicked White Witch with the aid of Aslan, the talking lion and true king of Narnia. Divided into fifteen levels, the game follows a linear style of gameplay, and makes use of various gameplay elements: stealth, combat, puzzle-solving, and strategy. While the first two levels are set in 1940s England, the third introduces Narnia as the setting. Film clips from The Chronicles of Narnia: The Lion, the Witch and the Wardrobe appear at the beginning and conclusion of each level. The game sports both single player and co-op modes. 2 players can play at once, but there can be as many as four playable characters to switch between in each level.

Along the way, the children will encounter and fight off various hostile creatures in the service of the White Witch. The most physically powerful of the group, Peter, wields a sword, and Susan can use archery and attack with ranged weapons, such as snowballs. Edmund carries a torch and can climb, while Lucy can tame and ride various animals. The player can alternate between the characters at any time, taking advantage of each character's special moves and features. Each child possesses nine special "power moves"; Lucy can heal other characters, for example. Additionally, the characters can team up with each other to produce various combo moves. For instance, Peter will swing Edmund around in a circle, while Edmund kicks anything in his path.

The player can also collect coins, which may be traded in for special moves and character upgrades, such as an increase in health. The player may also mark statues of petrified heroes for Aslan to restore; this directly affects the amount of reinforcements that the player will have in the final battle against the White Witch. Other bonus items can be found and collected throughout the game.

=== Handheld versions ===
The gameplay of the Game Boy Advance (GBA) and Nintendo DS (DS) differs from that of the PlayStation 2, GameCube, and Xbox. Composed of seventeen chapters, the GBA version features simpler gameplay, with only one character to play as per chapter and no ability to switch between characters during the level. To navigate the frozen land, the characters may have to remove natural obstacles by clearing snowdrifts or moving rocks out of their path. Combat for the characters consists of a normal attack and a stronger one. Certain skills, called nobilities, are learned by the characters as a result of aiding creatures and are accessible to all of the children once learned; one nobility allows the character to heal others, for example. Found throughout the game, chests contain health restoratives, such as tea and candy, and other items.

In contrast, the DS version uses a system of level-based progression. The characters gain experience points as they defeat enemies, and after earning a set number, level up; each level gained allots the player one virtue point to add to a selected character's statistics and improve either his or her health points, strength, defense or ability to use skills often. In addition to exploring Narnia, the characters can traverse a series of dungeons, fending off enemies and a boss. The player can also go on various side quests and be rewarded with learning a specific skill. The DS version allows the player to switch between characters, though not all may be available on certain levels. Playable characters not currently being controlled by the player can be commanded to attack, defend or other actions, such as healing.

Both versions introduce an indication of warmth, which shows how cold the player character is in the wintery land. In the GBA version, the depletion of the bar negatively affects the health of the player character, while in the DS version, the cold affects the collection of experience points and the speed of combat. In the GBA version, building a fire or consuming tea or toast will restore warmth to the character. For the DS version, taking shelter will warm the characters. The DS version also features a cycle of day and night which varies the temperature and enemies encountered.

== Plot ==
The fantasy land of Narnia has been under the spell of the evil White Witch, who makes it always winter but never Christmas, but when Aslan comes, it will be spring again and the Witch's reign will be over. Four children enter Narnia and, along with the legendary lion, Aslan, help defeat the White Witch and her evil minions.

== Development ==
The game was showcased at E3 2005.

=== Release ===
On 17 August 2005, Buena Vista Games' European division signed a five-month console exclusivity deal with Sony Computer Entertainment for the PlayStation 2 version, of which it would release alongside the PC and Handheld versions in November 2005. The deal also included marketing and television support, with the game also being included with PS2 bundles released during the 2005 Christmas season. The GameCube and Xbox versions would release at the end of March 2006 after the deal ended.

== Reception ==
Reception

Aggregate scores
Aggregator	Score					
Aggregator	DS	GBA	GameCube	PC	PS2	Xbox
GameRankings	67.93%	65.25%	73.20%	69.41%	68.71%	72.17%
Metacritic	65 / 100	66 / 100	71 / 100	71 / 100	68 / 100	72 / 100

Review scores
Publication	Score					
Publication	DS	GBA	GameCube	PC	PS2	Xbox
Eurogamer					7 / 10	
G4					3/5	
Game Informer			6.5 / 10		6.5 / 10	6.5 / 10
GamePro			3.5/5		3.5/5	3.5/5
GameSpot	6.3 / 10	6.2 / 10	6.9 / 10	6.9 / 10	6.9 / 10	6.9 / 10
GameSpy	2/5			2.5/5	3/5	3/5
GameZone	6.7 / 10			7.3 / 10	7.1 / 10	7.7 / 10
IGN	7.2 / 10	7.4 / 10	8.3 / 10	8.3 / 10	8.3 / 10	8.3 / 10
Nintendo Power	7 / 10		5.5 / 10			
Official U.S. PlayStation Magazine					2.5/5	
Official Xbox Magazine (US)						6.5 / 10
PC Gamer (US)				60%		

The game has received mixed to positive reviews. The slightly different style of combat available has been both praised and criticized.

The team style gameplay also has gotten mixed reception. Critics call the AI used to control the other children "dead", complaining that they do not help much when in the middle of battle. The authenticity of the game, that it uses voices, backgrounds, and music from the movie, has been looked upon well.

The Sydney Morning Herald gave it a score of three stars out of five and called it "a decent start to what will inevitably be a game series".

The game shipped more than 2 million copies.
