= The Chronicles of Narnia: Prince Caspian (video game) =

2008 video game

- Developers: Traveller's Tales; Fall Line Studios (DS)
- Publisher: Disney Interactive Studios
- Platforms: PlayStation 2, PlayStation 3, Wii, Windows, Xbox 360, Nintendo DS
- Release: May 15, 2008: NA: May 15, 2008; NA: May 23, 2008 (Wii); AU: June 12, 2008; EU: June 20, 2008; AU: July 3, 2008 (PC); AU: July 10, 2008 (Wii)
- Genre: Action-adventure
- Modes: Single-player, multiplayer

The Chronicles of Narnia: Prince Caspian is an action-adventure video game developed by Traveller's Tales (as the last game before transitioning to Lego-only property) to coincide with the theatrical release of the film of the same name. It was released for the Nintendo DS, Xbox 360, PlayStation 2, Wii, Microsoft Windows and PlayStation 3 on 15 May 2008 in North America to mixed reception. The DS version was the first game to implement Disney's DGamer online chat service.

William Moseley, Skandar Keynes, Anna Popplewell, Georgie Henley, Ben Barnes, Vincent Grass, Peter Dinklage, and Cornell S. John reprise their roles from the film.

== Plot ==
One year has passed in the real world since the first adventure ended, but in Narnia, almost 1300 years have passed. The villainous King Miraz prevents the rightful heir, his young nephew, Prince Caspian, from ruling the land of Narnia. Caspian uses Susan's magic horn that was left in Narnia to summon the four Pevensies and a small army of Old Narnians to help him reclaim his rightful throne and find Aslan.

Puzzles need to be solved to progress through the game and unlock bonus material. Featuring 20 playable characters, of which 4 are available in each level, each character uses different weapons and abilities. These Include: The Pevensie children, Prince Caspian, Glenstorm, Trumpkin, Dr. Cornelius, Reepicheep, Giant Wimbleweather, Tyrus the Satyr, and Asterius the Minotaur. In addition to these, several unnamed characters are also playable, including Trees, Fauns, Centaurs, Gryphons and horses. They can also be controlled after they have been mounted by the player's character. Bonus material is, however, primarily unlocked by opening Treasure Chests, which require a certain number of keys to be opened.

== Development ==
Walt Disney Pictures recorded an exclusive scene for the game that does not appear in the film. The bonus scene depicts Cornelius telling Caspian about the Pevensies, the Narnians and the war.

== Reception ==
Scores

Aggregate scores
| Aggregator | Score | | | | | |
| Aggregator | DS | PC | PS2 | PS3 | Wii | Xbox 360 |
|---|---|---|---|---|---|---|
| GameRankings | 52.22% | 60% | 75% | 59.12% | 68.75% | 61.78% |
| Metacritic | 54/100 | 53/100 | 67/100 | 56/100 | 63/100 | 56/100 |

Review scores
| Publication | Score | | | | | |
| Publication | DS | PC | PS2 | PS3 | Wii | Xbox 360 |
|---|---|---|---|---|---|---|
| 1Up.com | | | | | | D− |
| Game Informer | | | | 6.25/10 | | 6.25/10 |
| GamePro | 3/5 | | | | | |
| GameSpot | 4/10 | 6/10 | | 5.5/10 | | 5.5/10 |
| GameZone | 6.5/10 | | | 6.2/10 | | 5.8/10 |
| IGN | 7/10 | 6.3/10 | 6.3/10 | 6.3/10 | 6.3/10 | 6.3/10 |
| Official Nintendo Magazine | 55% | | | | | |
| Official Xbox Magazine (US) | | | | | | 5.5/10 |
| PlayStation: The Official Magazine | | | | 2/5 | | |
| VideoGamer.com | | | 8/10 | 8/10 | 8/10 | 8/10 |

The game was met with average to mixed reviews upon release. GameRankings and Metacritic gave it a score of 52.22% and 54 out of 100 for the DS version; 60% and 53 out of 100 for the PC version; 75% and 67 out of 100 for the PlayStation 2 version; 59.12% and 56 out of 100 for the PlayStation 3 version; 61.78% and 56 out of 100 for the Xbox 360 version; and 68.75% and 63 out of 100 for the Wii version.
