= Club Penguin: Elite Penguin Force =

2008 video game

- North American cover art
- Developer: 1st Playable Productions
- Publisher: Disney Interactive Studios
- Director: Andrew Carroll
- Composer: Bart Roijmans
- Platform: Nintendo DS
- Release: NA: November 25, 2008; EU: March 13, 2009; AU: April 16, 2009
- Genre: Adventure
- Modes: Single-player, multiplayer

Club Penguin: Elite Penguin Force is a point-and-click adventure game for the Nintendo DS based on Disney's massively multiplayer online game Club Penguin. It was released in North America on November 25, 2008, in Europe on March 13, 2009, and in Australia on April 16, 2009. In September 2009, a Collector's Edition was released which included upgrades to the game and extras. On June 10, 2010, Thrustmaster, a video game accessories manufacturer, created a "Full Spy Pack" inspired by the games. On March 8, 2012, a German regionalization of the Collector's Edition (but without DGamer) was released in Germany.

In the game, the player's penguin is assigned an Elite role ranked superior to the secret agents. Players embark on missions utilizing both familiar and all-new gadgets, accessories, vehicles, and locations to investigate mysterious events on Club Penguin. In addition, the game operates with the Nintendo Wi-Fi Connection system. Coins that are earned in the game could be sent to the player's online penguin via the DS. It has sold more than 1.5 million copies worldwide. A sequel, titled Club Penguin: Elite Penguin Force – Herbert's Revenge, was released for the DS in 2010.

== Gameplay ==
Gary the Gadget Guy, talking to the player

Club Penguin: Elite Penguin Force is a point and click game. Players will be able to earn coins as they play, and can embark on missions that use various gadgets, accessories, and abilities to investigate mysterious events on Club Penguin. Players will tackle new mini-games, such as mini-games that were also available on the Club Penguin website, such as Cart Surfer, Jet Pack Adventure, and Ice Fishing. To complete the game, the player must become the highest-ranked member of the Elite Penguin Force by completing thirteen different story missions. Side missions also become available after the player completes the first mission, and more of them are unlocked after the player obtains the necessary skills and techniques to beat them.

== Plot ==
After following a trail of clues meant as a test, the player assumes membership of the Elite Penguin Force (E.P.F.), a more secretive corporation than the Penguin Secret Agency co-directed by Dot the Disguise Gal, also known as "D". The player trains with a few of the Elite Puffles and is given the use of a Spy Gadget (a device in the shape of a Nintendo DS), and after helping to close a minor case, they are called upon to investigate the sudden disappearance of Gary the Gadget Guy, known as "G". With the help of various clues, the player finds him in an old tunnel at the Mine, trapped under a mine cart.

Due to Gary's short-term amnesia, the case surrounding his disappearance is closed. However, not long afterwards, the boiler in the Boiler Room is mysteriously stolen, causing the player to suspect that there is more to the case. The player quickly expedites their Puffle training, then tests out Gary's latest invention, the Snow Trekker. During the test run, the player discovers a stash of random items in and near the Ice Cave, as well as a strange gadget at the Mine entrance. They hand over the gadget to Gary, who confirms that it is his long-lost "Robo-Locator". This suddenly triggers his recovery from amnesia, and he remembers why he was in the Mine in the first place: he built three test robots to handle his riskier inventions, but their passion for overcoming challenges led them astray, and it was too late for him to turn them off.

After informing the Director of the E.P.F., Gary invents a Robo-Gadget to deactivate the test robots. The robots continue stealing items from around the island, including the speakers in the Night Club and the ticket booth from the Stage, but the player eventually immobilizes and deactivates all of the robots. They celebrate along with the other agents, but the celebration is interrupted when the Director issues an island-wide alert, revealing that Gary and the Elite Puffles have mysteriously vanished. The player manages to find their captor in the Mine's shaft: the Ultimate Proto-Bot 10000, a larger robot that the test robots have built using all of the stolen objects. It rampages around Club Penguin Island, searching for random items to upgrade itself with. With assistance from the Elite Puffles after the player frees them one at a time, the player manages to weaken and subdue the Ultimate Proto-Bot on Mount Tallest without harming Gary. They then use the Robo-Gadget to deactivate it, ending the chaos once and for all. The Director then praises the player, promoting them to the highest possible rank in the E.P.F., and reveals that all of the damage has been repaired.

== Critical reception ==
Reception

Aggregate score
Aggregator	Score
Metacritic	72/100

Review scores
Publication	Score
IGN	7/10
Variety	(average)

Club Penguin: Elite Penguin Force received "generally positive" reviews according to the review aggregation website Metacritic.
