= Phineas and Ferb: Ride Again =

2010 video game

- North American box art
- Developer: Altron
- Publisher: Disney Interactive Studios
- Director: Takeshi Tsurumi
- Programmers: Takeshi Tsurumi; Kazuya Koinuma; Toshiaki Wada
- Artists: Katsuki Yamaguchi; Yo Terada; Hiroyasu Ito
- Composer: Tomoyoshi Sato
- Platform: Nintendo DS
- Release: NA: September 14, 2010; PAL: April 1, 2011
- Genre: Platform
- Modes: Single-player, multiplayer

Phineas and Ferb: Ride Again is a platform video game based on the television series Phineas and Ferb, and a sequel of the video game Phineas and Ferb, developed by Altron and published by Disney Interactive Studios for the Nintendo DS console. It was released in North America on September 14, 2010, and later in PAL regions on April 1, 2011. It continues with the two inventor brothers, Phineas and Ferb, making another four big projects, including a rockin' skateboard course and a spaceship. Meanwhile, Perry wants to foil Dr. Doofenshmirtz's plans.

== Gameplay ==
Players can now play as Perry to save the world by battling Dr. Doofenshmirtz's robots and henchmen. Players can also play as Candace through mazes, trampolines, lily pads, and more and upgrade their gadgets from the first game for more power.

== Reception ==
Reception was generally positive, receiving a score of 86.50% based on 2 reviews. Game Vortex's Ricky Tucker gave the game a 93/100, concluding: "Phineas & Ferb Ride Again is easily one of the better-licensed games to hit in the last few years and a must-buy for fans regardless of age".
