= Hannah Montana video games =

A number of adventure/rhythm video games based on the Disney Channel show Hannah Montana and the film have been released. All the games were published by Buena Vista Games / Disney Interactive Studios.

== Overview ==
Year	Title	Developer(s)	Publisher(s)	Platform(s)	Ref.
2006	Hannah Montana	DC Studios	Buena Vista Games	Nintendo DS	
2007	Hannah Montana: In Action	Babaroga	Disney Mobile	Mobile phones	
2007	Hannah Montana: Music Jam	Gorilla Games	Disney Interactive Studios	Nintendo DS	
2007	Hannah Montana: Spotlight World Tour	Avalanche Software	Disney Interactive Studios	PlayStation 2 / Wii	
2009	Hannah Montana: The Movie	n-Space	Disney Interactive Studios	Windows / PlayStation 3 / Xbox 360 / Wii / Nintendo DS	
2009	Hannah Montana: Secret Star	TBA	Disney Mobile	Mobile phones	
2009	Hannah Montana: Rock Out the Show	Page 44 Studios	Disney Interactive Studios	PlayStation Portable	

== Games ==
=== 2006 game ===
Hannah Montana
- Developer: DC Studios
- Publisher: Buena Vista Games
- Platform: Nintendo DS
- Release: NA: October 10, 2006
- Genre: Adventure
- Mode: Single-player

Hannah Montana is an adventure video game released in October 2006 for the Nintendo DS. The player controls Miley Stewart and Lilly Truscott as they search for the person who might reveal Miley's secret alter ego, Hannah Montana. The player must find clues and combine items to solve mysteries, with the help of gadgets, including a magnifying glass and a flashlight. There is also an interactive dialogue and gesture system. Lilly may also ride her skateboard, rollerblades, or scooter in timed challenges. Players can also design customized clothing and access Hannah Montana's secret wardrobe via the Nintendo DS' wireless network. The player has to search for clues with Oliver Oken's gadgets. In the endgame, players can revisit locations to look for more wardrobe items and explore Malibu. The game sold 1.3 million copies.

=== 2007 games ===
Hannah Montana: Music Jam was released on October 16, 2007, in North America for Nintendo DS. The game lets players create songs, make music videos, and show their creations to other players. Players are able to link Nintendo DS systems over short-range wireless to form live "instrument" bands.

Hannah Montana: Spotlight World Tour was developed by Avalanche Software and released on November 6, 2007, in the U.S for PlayStation 2 and Wii. It features nine tour arenas including Tokyo, London and Paris. Players control Hannah's moves using the Wii Remote and Nunchuk (Wii) and dance pads (PS2). The game includes 16 songs from seasons 1 and 2. The game was released for PlayStation 2 on August 12, 2008.

=== 2009 games ===
Hannah Montana: The Movie Video Game was developed by n-Space. The game was released in North America—three days before the film's theatrical release—on April 7, 2009, and for Europe and Australia in May for the PlayStation 3, Nintendo DS, Xbox 360, and Wii. It was revealed by ESRB. The game had been leaked onto the internet about a week before the initial release date.

The player plays as Miley and Hannah by exploring Crowley Corners and interacting with Miley's family and friends during quests. Players unlock key items for concerts - like songs and concert venues - as quests are completed. In concert mode, players perform on six different stages (unlocked during story mode) to 9 Hannah songs. Players can join band members and play with them on the drums, keyboard or guitar. Points are given at performances and when a task is completed and can be used to buy more clothes and accessories.

The Z-Phone is the tool for figuring out quests and navigating the way around Crowley Corners. When someone receives a call, a small icon will flash on screen. The phone is used to keep track of achievements and unlockable items. It also displays the map that is used to move to different locations in Crowley Corners, marks the progress in the mission objectives and is used to take the player to the tour bus.

The player will also play various mini games to earn achievement points or trophies and unlock new game content. Mini games can be played in story or Quick Play Mode.

- Horse Riding - a ride with Blue Jeans, jumping the obstacles and collecting special items on the field to score points and unlock new game features.
- Milk Jug Topple (called "Bottle Toss" in game) - Tossing beanbags to topple milk jugs at the County Fair. The players collect points for each jug that is toppled to the ground.
- Horse Races - The player races a horse down a track or competes with other players by hitting the target with a water pistol.
- Frog Jump - The player earns points by launching rubber frogs onto passing lily pads with a hammer.

Hannah Montana: Rock Out the Show was bundled with the Hannah Montana PSP Entertainment Pack which includes a lilac PSP, a UMD featuring selected Hannah Montana episodes, a 2 GB memory stick and vinyl stickers. Developed by Page 44 Studios, standalone games were released on August 4, 2009 in North America. In the game, Robbie Ray gets sick, so Hannah has to manage her new tour around the world. The player must create the stages, select the songs, and dress Hannah. The song list includes 11 songs. The player must play rhythm-based games, while Hannah sings the songs.

While the Wii version was met with positive reviews, the Xbox 360 version of the game was panned by critics where it received a low score on Metacritic of 25/100.

=== Canceled game ===
Hannah Montana: Pop Star Exclusive
- Developer: WayForward Technologies
- Publisher: Disney Interactive Studios
- Director: Sean Velasco
- Producer: Robb Alvey
- Designer: Sean Velasco
- Programmer: Stephen Foot
- Artists: Michael Fromknecht; Ken Christiansen; Pablo Ruvalcaba
- Composer: Jake Kaufman
- Platform: Nintendo DS
- Release: Unreleased
- Genres: First-person, Photography game
- Mode: Single-player

Hannah Montana: Pop Star Exclusive was to be the fifth video game based on the Hannah Montana television show. It was a first-person photography game being developed by WayForward Technologies between 2007 and 2008 but was cancelled during development. A playable prototype and source code for the game were later discovered and released on March 7, 2024.

== Reception ==
IGN gave Spotlight World Tour for the PS2 a 4.5 (poor) rating.

In 2013, GamesRadar+ ranked the Xbox 360 version of Hannah Montana: The Movie as the 48th worst game ever made. The game has since been taken off the list.
