= Bart =

Bart is a masculine given name. It is a Dutch and Ashkenazi Jewish surname, and derives from the name Bartholomäus, a German form of the biblical name Bartholomew, which means 'son of talmai' in Aramaic.

== Surname ==
- Bart (surname)

== Given name ==
- Bart Andrus (born 1958), American football player and coach
- Bart Arens (born 1978), Dutch radio DJ
- Bart Baker (born 1986), American comedian and parody musician
- Bart Bassett (born 1961), Australian politician
- Bart Baxter (fl. 1990s–2000s), American poet
- Bart Becht (born 1956), Dutch businessman
- Bart Berman (born 1938), Dutch-Israeli pianist and composer
- Bart Biemans (born 1988), Belgian footballer
- Bart Bok (1906–1983), Dutch-American astronomer
- Bart Bongers (1946–2007), Dutch water polo player
- Bart Bowen (born 1967), American cyclist
- Bart Bradley (1930–2006), Canadian ice hockey centre
- Bart Braverman (born 1946), American actor
- Bart Brentjens (born 1968), Dutch cyclist
- Bart Bryant (born 1962), American golfer
- Bart Bull, American writer, reporter, author, columnist, and critic
- Bart Bunting (born 1976), Australian blind Paralympic alpine skier
- Bart Burns (1918–2007), American actor
- Bart Buysse (born 1986), Belgian footballer
- Bart Cambré (born 1970), Belgian business theorist
- Bart Campolo, American humanist writer and former Christian pastor
- Bart Cantz (1860–1943), American baseball player
- Bart Carlier (1929–2017), Dutch footballer
- Bart Carlton, American basketball player
- Bart Claessen (born 1980), Dutch trance music DJ
- Bart Conner (born 1958), American Olympic gymnast
- Bart Cummings (1927–2015), Australian racehorse trainer
- Bart Davis (born 1955), American lawyer and politician
- Bart De Clercq (born 1986), Belgian cyclist
- Bart Decrem, Belgian-born Silicon Valley entrepreneur
- Bart Deelkens (born 1978), Belgian footballer
- Bart De Wever (born 1970), Belgian politician
- Bart de Graaff (1967–2002), Dutch television personality
- Bart de Liefde (born 1976), Dutch politician and field hockey umpire
- Bart de Ligt (1883–1938), Dutch anarcho-pacifist and antimilitarist
- Bart DeLorenzo, American theatre director and producer
- Bart Dockx (born 1981), Belgian cyclist
- Bart Dodson, American paralympic athlete
- Bart Dorsa (born 1967), American artist, photographer, and filmmaker
- Bart D. Ehrman (born 1955), American biblical scholar and atheism activist
- Bart Evans (baseball) (born 1970), American baseball pitcher
- Bart Evans (polo), American polo player
- Bart Exposito (born 1970), American painter
- Bart Farley, American soccer goalkeeper
- Bart Fletcher, American actor
- Bart Forbes (born 1939), American painter and illustrator
- Bart Freundlich (born 1970), American film producer, director, and screenwriter
- Bart Giamatti (1938–1989), American university president and baseball executive
- Bart Goor (born 1973), Belgian soccer player
- Bart Gordon (born 1949), American lawyer and politician
- Bart Groothuis (born 1981), Dutch politician
- Bart Howard (1915–2004), American songwriter and pianist
- Bart King (1873–1965), American cricketer
- Bart Laeremans (born 1966), Belgian politician
- Bart Leysen (born 1969), Belgian cyclist
- Bart McGhee (1899–1979), soccer player who played as a forward
- Bart Moeyaert (born 1964), Belgian writer
- Bart Preneel (born 1963), Belgian scientist
- Bart Ramakers (born 1963), Belgian artist and art curator
- Bart Schilperoord (born 1982), Dutch cricketer
- Bart Scott (born 1980), American football player
- Bart Sibrel (born 1964), American conspiracy theory film maker
- Bart Somers (born 1964), Belgian politician
- Bart Staes (born 1958), Belgian politician
- Bart Starr (1934–2019), American football player and coach
- Bart Stupak (born 1952), Polish-American politician
- Bart Swings (born 1991), Belgian long track speed skater and inline speed skater
- Bart Taminiau (born 1947), Dutch field hockey player
- Bart Tanski (born 1990), American football player
- Bart Tobener (born 1970), American drag racer
- Bart Veldkamp (born 1967), Dutch speed skater
- Bart Verbruggen (born 2002), Dutch footballer
- Bart Visman (born 1962), Dutch composer
- Bart Voskamp (born 1968), Dutch cyclist
- Bart Wallet (born 1977), Dutch historian
- Bart Wellens (born 1978), Belgian cyclo-cross cyclist
- Bart Wenrich, American television producer
- Bart Whiteman (1948–2006), American theatre actor, director, producer, and critic
- Bart Willoughby (born 1960), Indigenous Australian musician
- Bart Wuyts (born 1969), Belgian tennis player
- Bart Yasso, American runner and biathlete
- Bart Yates, American novelist
- Bart Zeller (born 1941), American baseball player
- Bart Zoet (1942–1992), Dutch cyclist

=== Fictional characters ===
- Bart Allen, a DC Comics superhero called Flash, Kid Flash, and Impulse
- Bart Hamilton, the third Green Goblin, a Spider-Man villain
- Bart McQueen, in the soap opera Hollyoaks
- Bart Simpson, in the television series The Simpsons

=== Animals ===
- Bart the Bear (1977–2000), an Alaskan Kodiak bear who appeared in many Hollywood films
- Bart the Bear 2 (2000–2021), an Alaskan brown bear who appeared in films and television

== Acronyms ==
- BART, acronym for the Bay Area Rapid Transit, operating in the San Francisco Bay Area

== See also ==
- Black Bart (disambiguation)
- Tony Di Bart, stage name of English singer Antonio Carmine Di Bartolomeo (born 1964)
