= Sarbakan =

Canadian video game studio

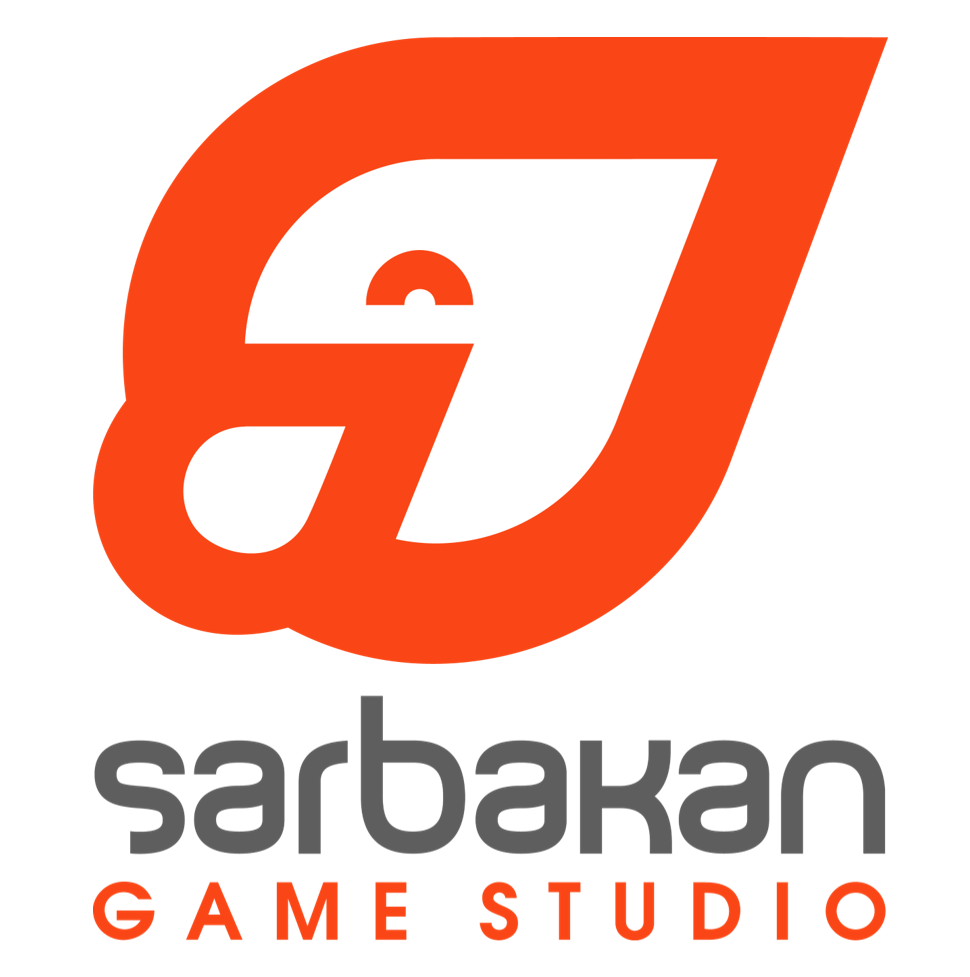
- Type: Subsidiary
- Industry: Video games
- Founded: 1998
- Headquarters: Quebec City, Quebec
- Number of employees: 60
- Parent: Adrenaline Amusements (2013–present)
- Website: sarbakanstudio.com/en/

Sarbakan is a Canadian video game studio based in Quebec City, Quebec. Ten years after its foundation in 1998 by Guy Boucher, Sarbakan had delivered over 600 games, mostly web-based, and started shifting its focus from flash game development to console digital download gaming.

In 2010, Sarbakan began collaborating with Disney Interactive Studios and other studios to make games for iOS and Android platforms. Where's My Water won multiple awards including 'Game of the Year' by Pocket Gamer, and in 2012 the iPhone "Apple Design Award" during WWDC. In 2013 the company would be acquired by Adrenaline Amusements.

== Games developed & co-developed ==
2012-2016

Game	Publisher	Platform(s)	Genre(s)
Where's My Water?	Disney Mobile	iOS, Google Play, Amazon	Puzzle
Where's My Perry?	Disney Mobile	iOS, Google Play, Amazon	Puzzle
Lazy Raiders	Namco-Bandai	iOS, Google Play, Amazon, Nook, Samsung	Puzzle
Wreck-it Ralph / Fix-it Felix	Disney Mobile	iOS, Google Play, Amazon	Platformer
Wreck-it Ralph / Sugar Rush: Sweet Climber	Disney Mobile	iOS, Google Play, Amazon	Endless Climbing
Wreck-it Ralph / Hero's Duty	Disney Mobile	iOS, Google Play, Amazon	Top Shooter
Wreck-it Ralph / Turbo Time	Disney Mobile	iOS, Google Play, Amazon	Racing
Wreck-it Ralph / Flight Command	Disney Mobile	iOS, Google Play, Amazon	Flight simulator
BlackOut : Bring the color back in the sky	Adrenaline Amusements	iOS, Google Play, Samsung, Windows, Windows 8 Phones	Swipe Action
Popeye Slots	Ludia	iOS, Google Play	Slot Machines
Banzai Blade	Cartoon Network Games	iOS	Swipe Action
Formula Cartoon	Cartoon Network Games	iOS	Racing
Zombro	News Corp	iOS, Google Play	Puzzle
Playmobil Dragons	Playmobil	Google Play, Amazon, Web	Swipe Action
B.O.B. Super Freaky Job (Monsters vs Aliens/DreamWorks Animation)	Adrenaline Amusements	iOS, Google Play	Puzzle
AdvenChewers	Warner Bros.	iOS, Google Play, Amazon	Side Scroller
GSN Casino- High Stakes Black Jack	GSN	iOS	Card games
Fruit Ninja FX 2 / Halfbrick	Adrenaline Amusements	Windows	Swipe Action
Jetpack Joyride / Halfbrick	Adrenaline Amusements	Windows	Side Scroller
Skylanders Cloud Patrol/ Activision	Adrenaline Amusements	Windows	Swipe Action
Tiny Warriors	Toonzone	iOS (soft-launch)	Match-3
Goldfish_Get Gilbert	Campbell/ Pepperidge Farm	iOS, Google Play	Puzzle path to finger
One button Sports	Namco-Bandai	iOS, Google Play	Sports
Catch-a-coin /Canadian Mint	Cossette Ad Agency	iOS, Google Play	Swipe Action
OMG! / National Bank	Vibrant Ad Agency	Windows 46inch Multi-Touch Screen	Trivia
Monster Factory	Adrenaline Amusements	Windows	Match monsters
Playmobil Knights	Playmobil	iOS, Google Play, Web	Light RPG
Playmobil Princess	Playmobil	iOS, Google Play, Web	Light RPG
Tinymals	Adrenaline Amusements	iOS, Amazon Kindle and Fire phone, Windows 8 Phones	Nurturing
Olaf's Adventures	Disney Mobile	iOS, Amazon	Adventure
Playmobil Luxury Mansion	Playmobil	iOS, Google Play, Web	Simulation
Flying Tickets	Adrenaline Amusements	Windows	Side scroller
Chesnaught's Spiky Shield	The Pokémon Company International	HTML5	Swipe action
Floette Float!	The Pokémon Company International	HTML5	Side scroller
Iron Man: Armored Avenger	Disney Mobile	Port to Amazon	Port
Mickey Mouse Club House: Wildlife Count Along	Disney Mobile	Port to Amazon	Port
Cars 2 World Grand Prix: Read & Race	Disney Mobile	Port to Amazon	Port
Sofia the first story theater	Disney Mobile	Port to Amazon	Port
Planes: Storybook Deluxe	Disney Mobile	Port to Amazon	Port
It's a Small World	Disney Mobile	Port to Amazon	Port
Candy Crush Saga	Adrenaline Amusements	Windows	Match-3
L’envolée ultime Banque Nationale	Vibrant Ad Agency	Windows and iPad	Side scroller
Goldfish Finn's Dream	Campbell/ Pepperidge Farm	iOS, Google Play, WebGL	Side-scrolling gravity-based platformer
Astro Beams	Warner Bros. / ESC	Wide screen 10’ x 30’	Multiplayer and social
Pink Martini Slot Machines	BTV	Facebook	Slot Machines
Solrock and Lunatones waterfall fun	The Pokémon Company International	HTML5	Endless Climbing
Inside Out Storybook Deluxe	Disney Mobile / Pixar	iOS, Google Play, Amazon	Storybook Deluxe & activities
Palace Pets in Whisker Haven	Disney Mobile	iOS, Google Play, Amazon	Nurture
Speed-of-Light	Dave & Busters	iOS, Google Play	Tap action
Goldfish Brooke's Giant Dream	Campbell/ Pepperidge Farm	iOS, Google Play, WebGL, trailer	Side Scroller
Crossy Road	Adrenaline Amusements	Windows Arcade	Endless Arcade Hopper
Playmobil Kaboom!	Playmobil	iOS, Google Play, Windows Arcade	Shooting
Playmobil Children's Hospital	Playmobil	iOS, Google Play, Amazon, Web	Light RPG
Blazing Bajirao	Eros Digital	iOS, Google Play, Web	Side Scroller
Inkay's Topsy-Turvy World	The Pokémon Company International	HTML5	Side Scroller
Goldfish XTreme's Hoop Dream	Campbell/ Pepperidge Farm	iOS, Google Play, Amazon, WebGL	Puzzle-Basketball
Motley Bricks	Square Enix	iOS, Google Play	Puzzle-Basketball

2011

Captain America: Sentinel of Liberty (iOS/Android)
Scene It? - Movie Night (XBLA/PSN)
iCarly: iSock it to 'Em (iOS)
Johnny Test (Nintendo DS)
Dora's Creativity Center (iOS)

2010

Wizards of Waverly Place: Spellbound (Nintendo DS)
Little Noir Stories – The Case of the Missing Girl (Downloadable)
Lazy Raiders (XBLA)

2009

Wedding Dash: Ready, Aim, Love! (Downloadable): Star Fever Agency (Social MMO)
Dora's Lost and Found Adventure (Downloadable)
Where's Waldo? The Fantastic Journey (Nintendo DS)

2008

The Game of Life – Path to Success (Downloadable)
The Game of Life – Classic (Downloadable)
Monopoly – SpongeBob SquarePants Edition (Downloadable)
The Game of Life – SpongeBob SquarePants Edition (Downloadable/Retail)
Spongebob Squarepants: Invasion of The Lava King (Online)
Wedding Dash 2 – Rings Around the World (Downloadable/Retail)
Fitness Dash (Downloadable)
School House Shuffle (Downloadable)
Wordmaster (Nintendo DS)
Horseland (Nintendo DS)
Huru Humi – Huru High (Online community)
Slimeball Multiplayer (Downloadable)
Scrabble (Downloadable)
Yahtzee Texas Hold’em (Downloadable)
NightMares the Adventures (Online episodic game – 5 episodes)
Mickey and Friends in Pillow Fight! (Online)

2005

Operation Victory (Downloadable)

2004

FireChild (Online)

2002

Houdini: Master of the Extraordinary (Online)

2001

Steppenwolf: The X-Creatures Project (Online episodic game – 24 episodes)

1999

Good Night Mr. Snoozleberg (Online episodic game – 8 episodes)
Arcane – Online Mystery Serial (Online episodic game – 12 episodes)
