= Bart Dorsa =

American photographer

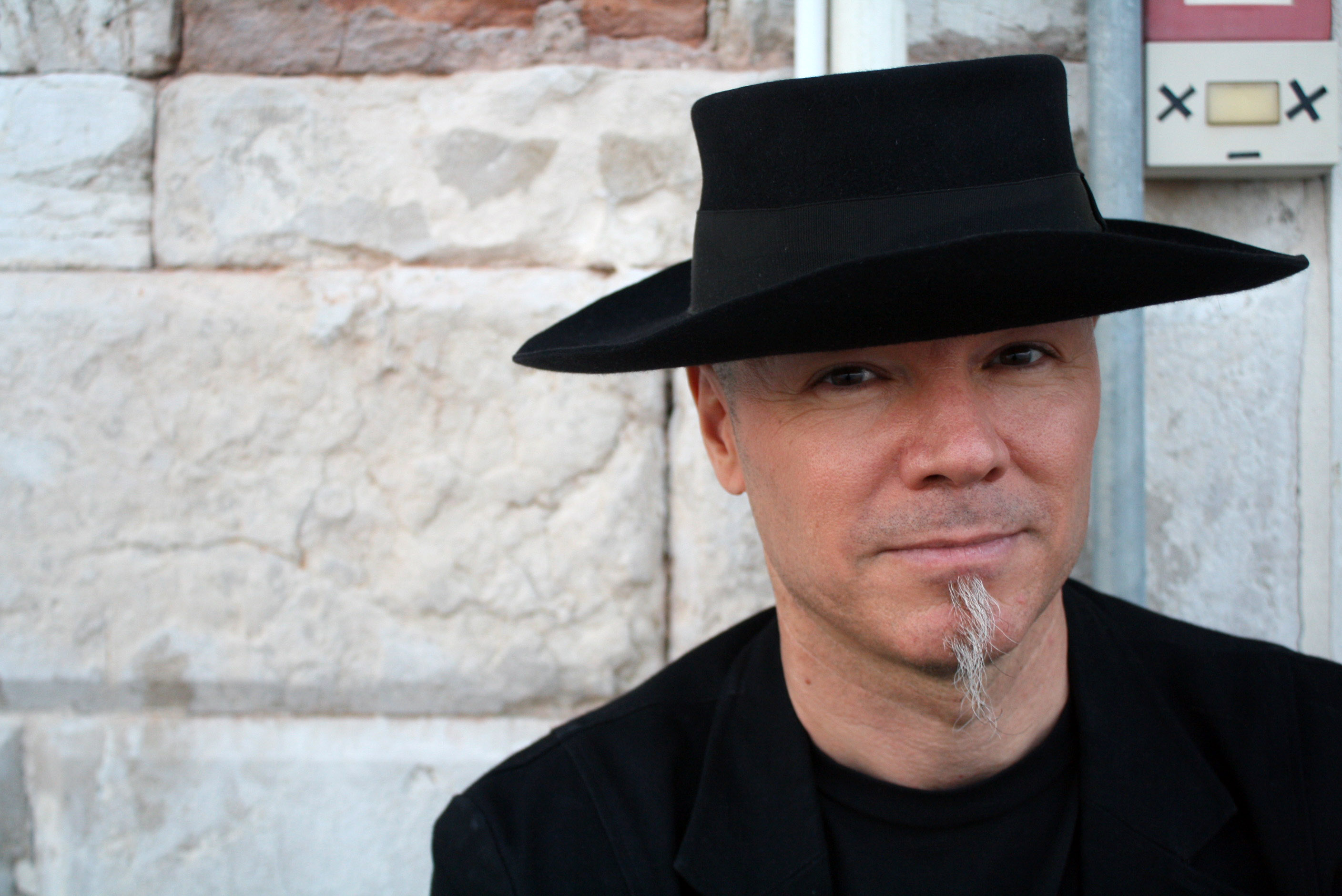
- Born: 1967 (age 58–59); California, United States
- Known for: Photography
- Website: www.dorsa.com

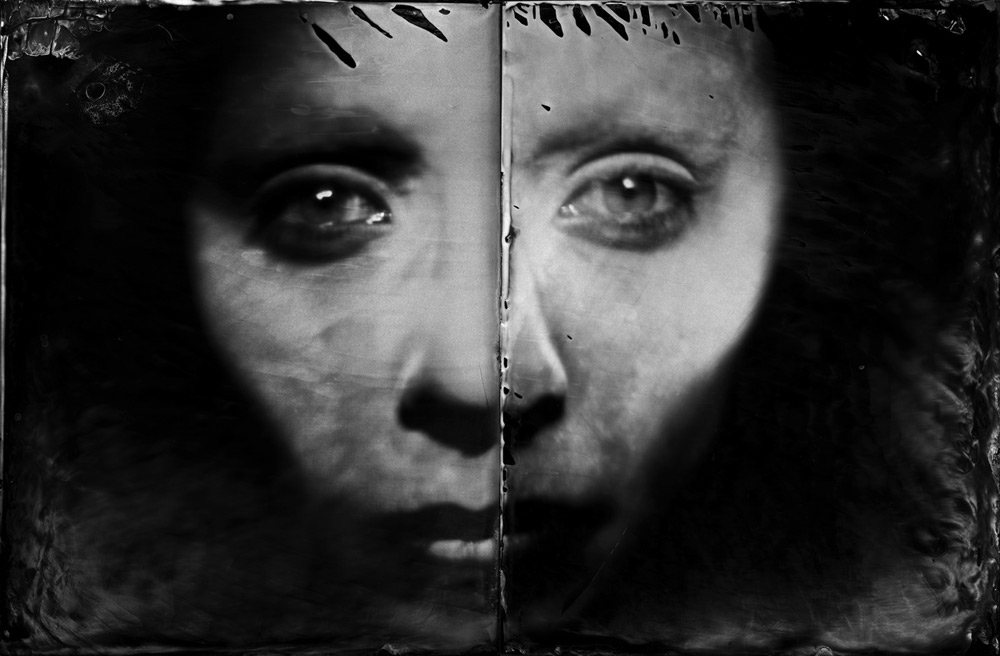
Katya Diptych 7, Crossroads series, 2012, Collodion and Silver Glass Photographic Plates, Individual size 93 cm x 61,5 cm, Courtesy Bart Dorsa

Bart Dorsa (born 1967) is an American artist, photographer, film-maker. Dorsa works in an old photographic technique (Collodion process). Dorsa's notable exhibitions have been at the Venice Biennale and Moscow Museum of Modern Art. In 2011 Dorsa pedaled his Flaming Duck kinetic sculpture around the city of Moscow.

== Early life ==
Dorsa was born in California to Frank and Marilyn Dorsa, and is the grandson of Frank Dorsa Sr the inventor of the Eggo waffle.

== Career ==
Dorsa began his career in visual arts as an independent filmmaker, but later moved to photography and sculpture. In May and June 2011 Dorsa pedaled his Flaming Duck kinetic sculpture for 6 weeks around the city of Moscow at times shooting fire as high as 50 feet into the air. Dorsa conceived the Duck as a present for his father's 69th birthday.

== Art ==
For almost 10 years now Bart Dorsa has been living in Moscow and working with various photographic techniques creating images that are experimental, emotional and have consistently challenged conventional notions of beauty. Dorsa studies wet plate technique in Europe and later experimented a lot with different cameras, lenses, and hand-made emulsions. To achieve the desired effect, Dorsa gradually removed all excess elements, until at some point he destroyed the camera and began shooting with only a lens and a camera obscura. Bart Dorsa has transformed traditional exhibition locations into spaces that create a context of mystery and emotion, covering the spaces in fabric and building unique 'sanctuary' space-within-space structures.

== Exhibitions ==
- May 2015 - November 2015 part of Glasstress Gotika Exhibition, Collateral Event of the 56th Venice Biennale,
- May 2013 - September 2013 "Katya" within Collateral Events of the 55th Venice Biennale
- May 2011 "Against The Sun", Skolkovo Moscow School of Management, Moscow
- November 2009 "Deep Inside My Doll House", Moscow Museum of Modern Art
- April 2009 "Silver Tongue Devil", Pobeda Gallery, Moscow

== Filmography ==
- 1999 - The Invisibles (executive producer)
- 1999 - Here Lies Lonely (director)
- 2001 - 3000 Miles to Graceland (actor)
