= Nemo's Reef =

2012 simulation video game

- Developer: Disney Mobile
- Platforms: iOS, Android, Windows Phone
- Release: December 20, 2012

Nemo's Reef was a mobile simulation video game developed by Disney Mobile based on Pixar's Finding Nemo franchise. It was released on December 20, 2012 and available for iOS, Android, and Windows Phone.

== Gameplay ==
Sometime after the events of Finding Nemo, the titular character is tasked with building a reef as part of a school assignment to attract rare types of fish. The game tasks with building and managing it, similar to other city-building games. There are three in-game currencies: Sand Dollars, Algae and Pearls, which are the most valuable. Players must also make the conditions right in order for visiting fish to stay. Players were also able to visit other friends' reefs.
