= Riddim Ribbon =

2010 video game

- Riddim Ribbon App Store icon
- Developer: Tapulous
- Publisher: Tapulous
- Designer: Dave Mathews (davemathews.com)
- Platform: iOS
- Genres: Music; Platformer
- Mode: Single-player

Riddim Ribbon Free is the second installment in Tapulous' series of music games, preceded by Riddim Ribbon feat. The Black Eyed Peas. It features Like a G6 by Far East Movement as a default track. Similar to Tap Tap Revenge 3, there is an in-app store where players can buy premium tracks or redeem them with store credits.

== Gameplay ==
Riddim Ribbon has a very similar gameplay to Riddim Ribbon feat. The Black Eyed Peas. It does not use any official remixes of the played songs, but instead plays a sound effect when the marble reaches an upper level. A new feature is introduced in which colored pebbles are collected and bonus points earned when three like-colored pebbles are connected side-by-side.

Riddim Ribbon is played by moving the iPod Touch or iPhone to turn the rolling marble and keep it on track.

== Soundtracks ==
Riddim Ribbon's track store features several premium tracks along with several free tracks as well.

=== Premium Tracks ===
Artist	Song title
Avenged Sevenfold	"Almost Easy"
Avenged Sevenfold	"Bat Country"
The Black Eyed Peas	"Imma Be"
The Black Eyed Peas	"Rock That Body"
Cascada	"Evacuate the Dancefloor"
Cascada	"Pyromania"
Fall Out Boy	"Sugar We're Goin Down"
Fall Out Boy	"Thnks Fr Th Mmrs"
Good Charlotte	"The Anthem (Million $ Mano Remix)"
Good Charlotte	"Little Things (Patrick Stump Remix)"
Gwen Stefani	"Hollaback Girl"
Gwen Stefani	"What You Waiting For?"
Jason Derülo	"In My Head"
Jason Derülo	"Ridin' Solo
Justin Timberlake	"SexyBack (feat. Timbaland)"
Justin Timberlake	"LoveStoned / I Think She Knows"
LMFAO	"I'm In Miami Trick"
LMFAO	"Shots"
La Roux	"Bulletproof"
La Roux	"In for the Kill"
Lady Gaga	"Alejandro (Skrillex Remix)"
Lady Gaga	"Bad Romance (DJ Dan Remix)"
Lady Gaga	"Just Dance"
Lady Gaga	"Poker Face (Space Cowboy Remix)"
Maroon 5	"Makes Me Wonder"
Maroon 5	"Misery"
Passion Pit	"Little Secrets"
Passion Pit	"Sleepyhead"
Rihanna	"Disturbia"
Rihanna	"Hard (Jumb Smokers Remix)"
Rihanna	"Rockstar 101 (Chew Fu Teachers Pet Fix)"
Rihanna	"Rude Boy (Chew Fu Vitamin S Fix)"
Rihanna	"Only Girl (In The World)"
Rihanna	"Pon de Replay"
Semi Precious Weapons	"Put a Diamond in It"
Semi Precious Weapons	"Semi Precious Weapons"
Taio Cruz	"Break Your Heart (Vito Benito FF Radio Remix)"
Taio Cruz	"Dynamite"

== See also ==
- Tap Tap Revenge
