= Riddim Ribbon feat. The Black Eyed Peas =

2010 video game

Riddim Ribbon featuring The Black Eyed Peas
- Riddim Ribbon App Store icon
- Developer: Tapulous
- Publisher: Tapulous
- Designer: Dave Mathews (davemathews.com)
- Platform: iOS
- Genre: Music
- Mode: Single-player

Riddim Ribbon featuring The Black Eyed Peas is the first installment in Tapulous' series of music games, succeeded by Riddim Ribbon Free. It features three tracks by The Black Eyed Peas plus more tracks that can be purchased from Apple's in-app purchase. Previously Tapulous had created games in the Tap Tap series including Tap Tap Revenge, Tap Tap Revenge 2 and Tap Tap Revenge 3.

== Gameplay ==
In Riddim Ribbon the player plays the part of a DJ and guides a spinning marble down a ribbon to try to create remixes in songs. The player must follow the ribbon to keep gaining points. If the player falls off of the ribbon they lose points and their streak. Every level is harder to play with more turns, and jumps.

Riddim Ribbon gameplay

Riddim Ribbon allows players to create their own remixes. At each checkpoint a player can decide which direction to turn and can choose a different remix.

Riddim Ribbon also allows players to challenge their friends on the remixes they make to see who can get a better score.

Riddim Ribbon is played by moving the iPod Touch or iPhone to turn the rolling marble and keep it on track.

== Soundtracks ==
Riddim Ribbon features three artists; Tiesto, The Black Eyed peas and Benny Benassi. Tapulous has also announced that they expect to have more music soon.

Black Eyed Peas helped create the entire game. On the day it was released will.i.am a rapper and DJ for Black Eyed Peas said "I am so excited about this game... it makes you re-think the concept of playing a song... It makes you re-think the remix..."

Song title	Artist	Easy	Medium	Hard
Boom Boom Pow	The Black Eyed Peas	✓	✓	✓
Meet Me Halfway	The Black Eyed Peas	✓	✓	✓
I Gotta Feeling	The Black Eyed Peas	✓	✓	✓
Imma Be • Rock That Body Mashup	The Black Eyed Peas	✓	✓	✗
Escape Me	Tiësto	✗	✓	✓
Escape Me (Sample)	Tiësto	✗	✓	✗
Louder Than Boom	Tiësto	✗	✓	✓
Satisfaction	Benny Benassi	✗	✓	✓

=== Remixes ===
Along with the base songs there are also many remixes. These remixes were created by DJ's including will.i.am, David Guetta, and Robbie Rivera

Song title	Remix Artist	Remix Title
Boom Boom Pow	Will.i.am	"Boom Boom Wow"
Boom Boom Pow	Zuper Blahg	"Boom Boom Style"
I Gotta Feeling	Printz & Zuper Blahq	Printz vs. Zuper Blahq Remix
I Gotta Feeling	David Guetta	David Guetta FMIF Remix
I Gotta Feeling	Zuper Blahq	Zuper Blahq Remix
I Gotta Feeling	Taboo	Taboo's Broken Spanglish Remix
Meet Me Halfway	Printz Board	Printz Board Remix for Beets & Produce, Inc.
Meet Me Halfway	DJ Ammo/Poet	DJ Ammo/Poet Name Life Remix
Louder Than Boom	Bart B More	Bart B More Remix
Louder Than Boom	Henry Saiz	Henry Saiz Remix
Louder Than Boom	Tyrane	Tyrane Remix
Escape Me	Avicii	Avicii's Remix At Night
Escape Me	Alex Gaudino & Jason Rooney	Alex Gaudino & Jason Rooney Remix
Escape Me	LA Riots	LA Riots Remix
Satisfaction	Isak	Isak Original
Satisfaction	Robbie Rivera	Robbie Rivera Remix
Satisfaction	Steve Murano	Steve Murano Remix
Satisfaction	DJ I.C.O.N.	DJ I.C.O.N. Remix

== Development and History ==
On September 28, 2009, a video was released of Bart Decrem the company's CEO, announcing the new game, Riddim Ribbon, developed by Tapulous and Seek Mobile Interactive utilizing the SeekTech engine. On February 8, 2010 it was released for the iPhone across the world.

=== 1.0.2 ===
The first update of the game within days of the release, and fixed many minor bugs that were found by users within the first few days.

A new release is expected by users addressing many issues with Riddim Ribbon within the first few weeks of release.

=== 1.0.3 ===
On February 18, 2010 the second update was released. The update featured some wanted features by users and overall made players happier.

Levels were made easier to unlock. A sensitivity bar was added to the options menu allowing players to choose how sensitive the turn movements were. Some of the audio effects were changed as well.

1.0.3 was the first large update released by Tapulous however more updates are expected by players in the future.

== Reception ==
Within 24 hours of the release of Riddim Ribbon it had become the 15th most popular game in the iTunes Store. Later that day it hit the number 4 most grossed and downloaded app. In less than 72 hours after the release, Riddim Ribbon later reached #1 for Top Paid Music Game jumping ahead of Rock Band. Just hours later Riddim Ribbon then became the highest grossing app in the app store.

The overall reception of Riddim Ribbon was fairly good. Although many people criticized Tapulous for making so few songs, they have promised to soon add "...more huge artists. New music [will be] added frequently!"

Reviews of Riddim Ribbon
Version 1.0.3

Review scores
Publication	Score
GameSpot	9.6/10
Touch Reviews	5/5
TouchGen	4/5
iPhone Reviews 2.0	8/10
148Apps	3.5/5

== See also ==
- Riddim Ribbon
- Tapulous
