= Tapulous =

American software and video game company

Tapulous, Inc.
- Formerly: Gogo Apps
- Type: Subsidiary
- Industry: Video games Computer software
- Founded: February 2008; 18 years ago
- Founders: Bart Decrem; Andrew Lacy
- Defunct: January 9, 2014; 12 years ago
- Fate: Shut down; all games removed from App Store
- Headquarters: Palo Alto, California, U.S.
- Area served: Worldwide
- Key people: Bart Decrem (CEO); Andrew Lacy (COO)
- Products: Tap Tap series
- Owner: Disney Interactive (The Walt Disney Company)
- Number of employees: 20
- Parent: Disney Mobile
- Website: tapulous.com

Tapulous, Inc. was an American software and video game developer and publisher headquartered in Palo Alto, California. It was a wholly owned subsidiary of The Walt Disney Company as part of Disney Interactive's Disney Mobile unit. The company's most profitable products were the Tap Tap series of music games, which surpassed thirty-five million downloads.

Tapulous was founded in February 2008 with the specific intention of developing software applications for the iOS platform. The company's Tap Tap Revenge gained at least one million players in less than one month of availability, and was the most-downloaded free game of the App Store in 2008. Building on the success of the game, Tapulous then heavily focused on the Tap Tap Revenge series by expansion and partnership with Universal Records. As of December 2009, the company's sales totaled nearly $1 million per month. In July 2010, the company was acquired by The Walt Disney Company. On January 9, 2014, the company shut down and removed all its remaining games from the App Store.

== History ==
With the advent of unofficial applications being distributed across the internet, Apple announced the availability of a native SDK for the iOS/iPhone platform in October 2007.

As a reaction to the announcement of the SDK, Tapulous formed in January 2008 with the initial name of "Gogo Apps". Its co-founders were Bart Decrem, an entrepreneur who helped launch the Firefox browser and was the founding CEO of Flock, Inc. and Andrew Lacy, a consultant of McKinsey & Company. The company thereafter changed its name to the current one, and hired developers Nate True and Guy English to develop Tap Tap Revenge as a launch title for the App Store, although the actual release date was eventually several days after the launch of the store. Meanwhile, Layton Duncan and Tristan O'Tierney developed Twinkle as another launch product. Initial investment in the company was provided by Rob Theis in 2007, and later followed by $1.8 million USD, from Andreas Bechtolsheim and Roy Thiele-Sardina via HighBAR Ventures, Marc Benioff, the late Rajeev Motwani, and others.

Within a month of its publishing, the game Tap Tap Revenge became one of the most popular applications available for the iOS, and had over one million players, and was installed on about twenty percent of all iPhone and iPod Touch devices. In December 2008, it was announced that the game was the most-downloaded free game in the App Store for the year. In April, 2009, comScore announced that Tap Tap Revenge was the most-installed app on the App Store. Tapulous continued to release sequels of the game as a part of the Tap Tap series, and became involved with major label Universal Records in June 2009 to feature their artists in their games.

On July 1, 2010, Tapulous was acquired by The Walt Disney Company and incorporated into Disney Mobile as a wholly owned subsidiary, part of Disney Interactive Media Group. As of January 7, 2014, Bart Decrem officially resigned as CEO of Tapulous. This was followed days later with an announcement that the Tap Tap apps would be pulled from the iPhone store on January 10 and servers would be shut down by the company some time in February.

== See also ==
- Riddim Ribbon feat. The Black Eyed Peas
- Riddim Ribbon
