= Where's My Water?: Swampy's Underground Adventures =

American web cartoon series by Disney.com

- Genre: Comedy
- Based on: Where's My Water? by Disney
- Developed by: Disney.com
- Directed by: Rob Fendler
- Starring: Justin T. Bowler, Rebecca Metz
- Opening theme: Where's My Water (Theme)
- Country of origin: United States
- Original language: Grammelot
- No. of episodes: 12

Production
- Producer: Kori Rae
- Running time: 2 mins
- Production companies: Animax Entertainment; Disney Interactive Media Group

Original release
- Network: Disney XD; Disney.com; Disney Channel
- Release: October 18, 2012 – January 17, 2013

Where's My Water?: Swampy's Underground Adventures is an American animated web series on Disney.com based on the 2011 mobile app game Where's My Water?. It was posted from October 2012 to January 2013 on Disney.com and has also been broadcast on Disney Channel and Disney XD.

== Characters ==
- Swampy is an alligator who lives in the sewers, but unlike the other alligators, he enjoys taking baths. The other alligators like to tamper with his plumbing. He has a crush on Allie, and tries to impress her. Swampy is voiced by Justin T. Bowler, who also provided Swampy's voice in the game.
- Cranky is the alpha male of the sewer alligators. He dislikes humans, and as a result, dislikes Swampy's human-like bathing, he is also interested in Allie. Cranky is also voiced by Justin T. Bowler
- Allie is a female alligator who perceives Swampy as quirky, but charming and sweet. Swampy and Cranky regularly show affection for her. Allie is voiced by Rebecca Metz
- Karl is a clueless alligator who is friends with Swampy, Cranky, and Allie. He usually does a lot of dumb actions throughout each episode and appears to have a big appetite, as he is usually seen eating many things in the show.
- Pushy and Shovey are an alligator duo who have a personal hatred for each other and they tend to fight each other and misbehave, they occasionally act as Cranky's minions.

In addition to voicing Swampy and Cranky, Bowler also provided the voices of the Karl, Pushy and Shovey in the show.

== Production ==
The series was originally going to be a series of shorts on TV, but was changed to a web series. Production started in March 2012 and the first promo was shown on Disney.com in July 2012. A trailer was published on August 30.

== Release ==
The first episode aired on August 31, 2012 and officially aired on October 5, 2012. It was shown on Disney Channel with Lego's "Friends Of Heartlake City" on October 12. A press release announced the premiere of the series on video.disney.com and YouTube (Note: Uploads from 2012 through late 2019 on Disney's YouTube channel were set to private sometime around November 2024, and are therefore inaccessible. The episodes however, remain available on the Disney Video side of the disney.com website.) on October 18, 2012.

== Episodes ==
Seasons	Episodes	First airdate	Last airdate
1	12	October 18, 2012	January 17, 2013

=== Season 1: 2012–13 ===
The episodes were published on disney.com, then posted to YouTube and made public on Fridays in 2012 and Thursdays in 2013. They were later broadcast on the Disney Channel in between other shows. It also started airing on Disney XD on July 13, 2013 as part of Randomation Animation.

No.	Title	Disney.com publish date	Disney Channel airdate
1	"Meet Swampy"	October 18, 2012; October 18, 2012 (YouTube)	October 12, 2012
When Swampy mistakes a fire extinguisher for a rocket pack to show off for Allie - he becomes a foam-spewing rocket gator!
2	"Rising Tide"	October 25, 2012	October 27, 2012
Swampy explores the sewer, and feeds a small algae creature. But it follows him, and absorbs more water until it turns into a ferocious monster.
3	"Change Is Good"	October 30, 2012	November 3, 2012
Swampy wants the sewer to be clean, but Cranky wants the sewer to stay messy. They engage in a political campaign against each other.
4	"Troubled Waters"	November 7, 2012	November 10, 2012
A pair of sunglasses lands on Swampy's tail and takes on a life of its own, while dragging Swampy along.
5	"Under Pressure"	November 14, 2012	December 29, 2012
When Cranky accidentally swallows a radio, Swampy, Allie, and Karl have a dance party.
6	"Out to Dry"	November 28, 2012	December 29, 2012
When the sewer goes dry, it's up to Swampy and Cranky to find out why.
7	"Sink or Swim"	December 5, 2012	January 25, 2013
Allie sees that Swampy, Cranky, and Karl are sitting around eating donuts and becoming fat, so she puts them through an exercise program.
8	"Stretched Thin"	December 13, 2012	January 26, 2013
A bottle of glue gets the gators in a sticky situation.
9	"On Ice"	December 18, 2012	February 1, 2013
Cranky is turned to ice.
10	"Boiling Point"	January 3, 2013	February 2, 2013
Swampy and the alligators discover a balloon and believe it's an alien. Can they make sense of this UFO before they reach their boiling point?
11	"Double Trouble"	January 9, 2013	February 15, 2013
Swampy looks in a mirror and enters a parallel universe. Note: Perry the Platypus from Phineas and Ferb appears while Swampy falls.
12	"Ducky"	January 17, 2013	March 1, 2013
Swampy tries to get his rubber duck back from a duck family.
