= Lazy Raiders =

2010 video game

- Developers: Sarbakan (X360); Namco Networks (iOS, Android)
- Publishers: Microsoft Game Studios; Namco Networks (iOS, Android)
- Platforms: Xbox Live Arcade, iOS, Android
- Release: XBLA; February 24, 2010 iOS; November 15, 2012; Android; May 11, 2013
- Genre: Action/Puzzle
- Mode: Single-player

Lazy Raiders (originally Dig It Up) is a video game developed by Sarbakan and published by Microsoft Game Studios for Xbox Live Arcade in 2010. It was later ported and published by Namco Networks for iOS in 2012, and for Android in 2013.

== Gameplay ==
Lazy Raiders uses a "World-Flip" mechanic that allows the player to flip and spin the entire world, which allows gravity to move objects (such as Dr. Diggabone, boulders, minions and thieves) through mazes. The game has 80 levels set in three different settings: Seven Cities of Gold, Arctic Caves and Wild West.

== Development ==
Lazy Raiders was originally planned for both an XBLA and a WiiWare release, but the developers struggled to reach both demographics. Eventually they abandoned WiiWare as the multiplatform angle "resulted in design hazards that did nothing but dilute the whole game experience." Likewise, the game was initially planned to include two multiplayer modes. These were scrapped as the team was already under heavy time constraints. On June 7, 2016, it was announced that Lazy Raiders along with Anomaly: Warzone Earth and Aqua would be released for Xbox One Back Compat.

== Reception ==
Reception

Aggregate score
Aggregator	Score
Metacritic	(iOS) 82/100 (X360) 80/100

Review scores
Publication	Score
4Players	(X360) 80%
Eurogamer	(X360) 8/10
GameSpot	(X360) 7.5/10
IGN	(X360) 8/10
Jeuxvideo.com	(iOS) 11/20
Official Xbox Magazine (US)	(X360) 8/10
Pocket Gamer	(iOS) 4/5
TeamXbox	(X360) 8/10

The Xbox 360 and iOS versions received "favorable" reviews according to the review aggregation website Metacritic. IGN described the former as "one of the most polished and good looking XBLA games we've played in a while." Pocket Gamer called the latter "A priceless artifact."

Since its release, the Xbox 360 version sold 13,063 units worldwide by January 2011. Sales moved up to 14,876 units by the end of 2011.
