= Eggo Cereal =

Breakfast cereal made by WK Kellogg Co

Eggo (cereal)
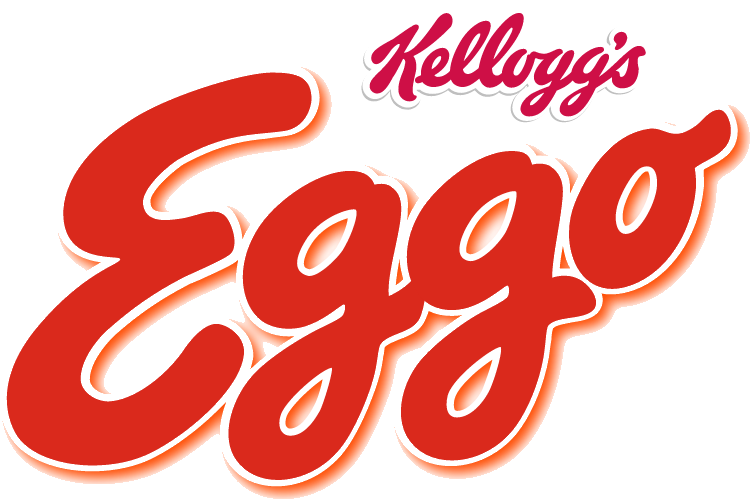

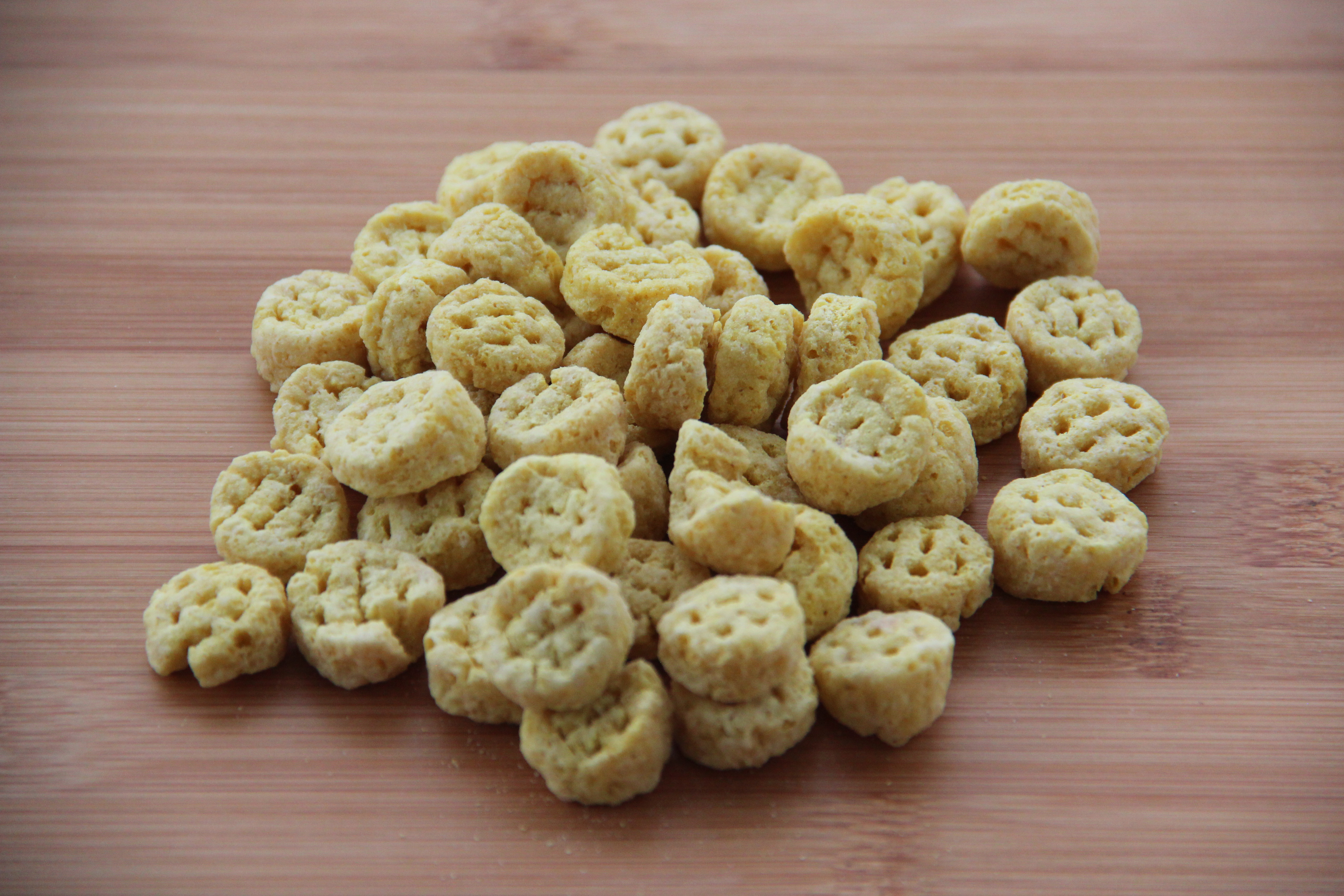
- Product type: Breakfast cereal
- Current owner: WK Kellogg Co
- Country: U.S.
- Introduced: 2006
- Previous owners: Kellogg Company (2006–2023)

Eggo Cereal is a multigrain breakfast cereal introduced in 2006 and reintroduced in 2019. It is manufactured by WK Kellogg Co, a spin-out of Kellogg's. It resembles Eggo waffles, a brand of frozen waffles produced by Kellanova and shares much of the same branding.

== History ==
In 2006, Kellogg's officially released Eggo Cereal. It came in two flavors: Maple Syrup and Cinnamon Toast. The cereal was discontinued in 2012.

In August 2019, the official Twitter page for Eggo posted a message on National Waffle Day saying that if their post got 10,000 retweets, they would officially bring the product back. By 6 September, the goal was reached, and in November Kellogg's brought back the Eggo cereal on the shelves of Walmart, with other local stores following in December. The new version came out with three flavors: Homestyle, Blueberry, and Chocolate. As of 2021, the Blueberry flavor has been discontinued.

== Product Information ==
Eggo Cereal consists of maple syrup, cinnamon toast, and flavoured corn cereal pieces in a waffle shape, just like Eggo waffles. It was considered a multigrain cereal that is lightly sweetened to taste accordingly to the Eggo waffles that it was created after. It was produced to have a light buttery and maple taste to it. It was specifically shaped to resemble miniature Eggo waffles. An average serving size of this cereal was about one cup. For every serving of this cereal, there were 120 calories and 12 grams of sugar. Eggo Cereal contained allergens such as wheat, corn product, and soy beans. It is claimed that there is no actual maple syrup within the maple syrup Eggo cereal ingredients. The dietary exchanges labeled on the Eggo cereal are based on the Choose Your Foods Exchange Lists for Diabetes copyright 2008 by American Dietetic Association and American Diabetes Association.
