= Justin T. Bowler =

American actor, writer, and producer

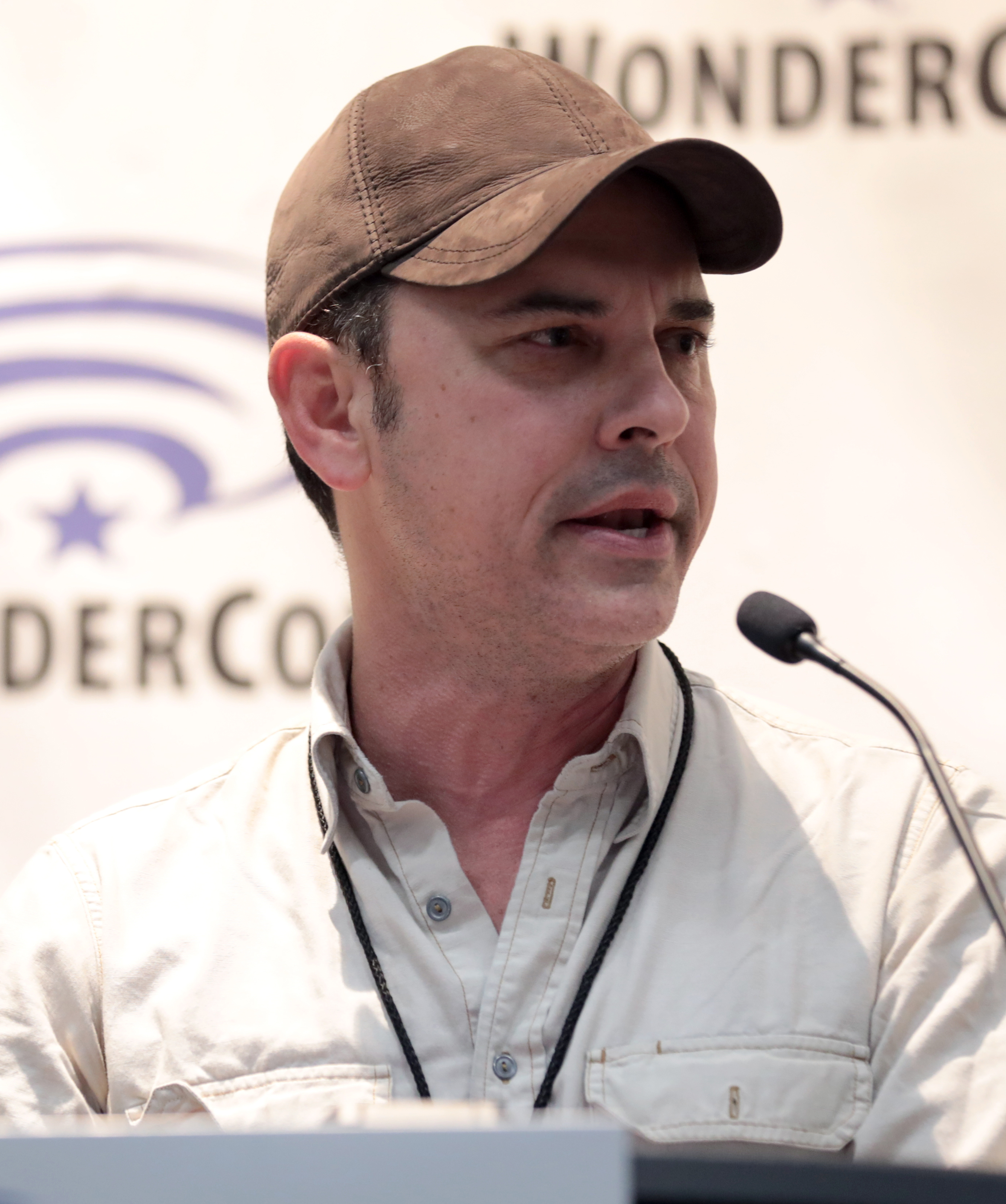
- Bowler at the 2023 WonderCon
- Born: Justin T. Bowler; February 12, 1974 (age 52); Los Angeles, California, U.S.
- Occupations: Actor, writer, producer
- Years active: 1996–present
- Website: justintbowler.com

Justin T. Bowler (born February 12, 1974) is an American actor, writer, and producer. He is best known for his role as the Disney characters "Swampy" and "Cranky" on Where's My Water?: Swampy's Underground Adventures. He wrote, executive produced and starred in the short film Touch, which won several film festival awards.

== Career ==
In 2007, Justin T. Bowler starred in, co-wrote, co-produced the feature film "Pool Party".

In 2010, Justin became a contributing writer, and reviewer for the comedic entertainment news site "The Movie Guys".

In March, 2011, he wrote and executive produced the award-winning short film, Touch. The film was accepted to over 20 domestic and international film festivals and won 5 awards.

In the summer of 2011, Justin sang three tracks on the Wii video game The Smurfs Dance Party.

In the fall of 2011, Justin provided the voices of Swampy, and his nemesis, Cranky, in the Disney Interactive Studios application Where's My Water?.

In 2012–2013, he reprised the voices of Swampy and Cranky, in addition to the rest of the male voices, in the animated Disney series Where's My Water?: Swampy's Underground Adventures.

== Filmography ==
Actor

Year	Title	Role
1995	Date Smart	John
1996	Job Smart	Tommy Picnic
1997	Home of Your Own	John
1997	Safety Smart	Darren
1999 - 2000	Crime Strike (TV series)	Store Manager
2005	Designing Spaces	Correspondent
2006	Untold Stories of the ER (TV series)	Officer Down
2007	John Kerwin Show	Sketch Actor
2012-2013	Where's My Water?: Swampy's Underground Adventures	Swampy & Cranky

Video game

Year	Title	Role
2011	The Smurfs Dance Party	Lead Vocalist
2011	Where's My Water?	Swampy & Cranky
2011	Minute to Win It	Arnold Schwarzenegger

Producer

Year	Title	Role
1996	Job Smart	co-producer
1998	Community Man	producer
2009	Two of a Kind	executive producer
