= Diggin' Dogs =

2012 video game

- Developer: Soap Creative
- Publisher: Chillingo
- Platform: iOS
- Release: February 9, 2012
- Genre: Puzzle
- Mode: Single-player

Diggin' Dogs is a 2012 casual puzzle video game developed by Soap Creative and published by Chillingo for iOS devices. The player must guide dogs to the end of a level by swiping the screen to dig through dirt and tilting the device left or right using accelerometer-based motion controls to move dogs and items. Diggin' Dogs received "generally favorable reviews", according to review aggregator Metacritic, and was compared by critics to Where's My Water?, a game with a similar digging mechanic, although Diggin' Dogs was in development before it released.

== Gameplay ==
The player must dig tunnels to guide the dogs to the end of the level, while avoiding hazards such as poison mushrooms

Each level begins with three dogs, and the player must guide them to a golden boot the end of the level by digging a path down through the dirt by swiping the screen. Tilting the device left or right using accelerometer-based motion controls causes the dogs and items in the level to slide accordingly, with gravity moving downwards, preventing backtracking. Dogs are moved using physics rather than controlled directly and jump when tapped by the player. Items in the level can be interacted with to change the game's physics, such as reversing gravity for things in the level other than the dogs.

Hazards including enemy creatures (such as bats and ghost pirates) and traps must be avoided, or the dogs that touch them die; traps can be slid into enemies to kill them. Helmets may be picked up to provide abilities for the dog wearing it, such as negating the effects of a type of hazard (e.g. a hat that turns poisonous mushrooms into coins), or having coins in the level magnetically move towards the dog. Splitting up the three dogs into separate tunnels is necessary to collect helmets needed to complete some levels. At least one dog must reach the end of the level to complete it - finishing a level with all three dogs awards additional points.

Diggin' Dogs has 61 levels and five worlds with different themes: forest, snow, junkyard, jungle, volcano. Coins and bones can be collected in each level; coins award points, while bones are used to unlock additional levels. There are three bones in each level, and a golden bone that unlocks all levels at once may be bought through an in-app purchase. Score is determined at the end of a level by the number of dogs alive and the number of coins collected, awarding a gold, silver or bronze medal ranking for the level. Rankings are listed on Chillingo's Crystal leaderboard.

== Development ==
Developer Soap Creative is based in Australia. Diggin' Dogs was first exhibited by Electronic Arts at an event in San Francisco in 2011, and was released for iOS on February 9, 2012. Prototypes for the game's engine existed in 2007, and the first "incarnation" of Diggin' Dogs gameplay concept was a game titled Escape of the Blobs designed by Patrick Cook for an internal "Game in a Day" competition at Soap Creative. In 2008, Soap Creative worked with Edmund McMillen on a mature version of the game that had a steampunk theme with the gameplay concept "possibly going to be worms eating into a diseased brain", but this was short-lived and the project never materialized. Soap Creative also made a flash game with a similar digging mechanic titled Truffle Hunter.

Cook summarized Diggin' Dogs as having "the presentation of a cutesy casual game and the gameplay core of an old school gamer's game". Cook described the game's digging as a "never seen before core mechanic" at the time of development that was overshadowed by Where's My Water?, a game with a similar mechanic, that released several months before Diggin' Dogs.

== Reception ==
Reception

Aggregate score
Aggregator	Score
Metacritic	80/100

Review scores
Publication	Score
AppSpy	5/5
148Apps	4/5
Multiplayer.it	8/10
Pocket Gamer	8/10
TouchArcade	3.5/5
Slide To Play	3/4
Gamezebo	3.5/5

Diggin' Dogs received "generally favorable reviews", according to review aggregator Metacritic. Diggin' Dogs was extensively compared to Where's My Water? by critics, with TouchArcade describing the game as "Where's My Water?, with Doggies", and Gamezebo criticizing how similar the game is, stating that it "borrows too much from an already successful formula ... [without] adding much new".

Several reviews noted Diggin' Dogs' varied gameplay, with 148Apps stating that it "offer[s] enough challenge and intrigue to have the player entertained for a long time" due to its variety, and Slide To Play called it "seriously imaginative" with "a surprising amount of depth". AppSpy called the game "addictive", praising its varied levels and gameplay elements and comparing it to The Lost Vikings, and called its graphics "charmingly rendered, with simple, yet adorable characters". Gamezebo praised its level design, stating that it "challenges players to think ahead". Pocket Gamer praised the game's difficulty and called its level design "inventive".

TouchArcade called the game "cute and entertaining", and praised its intuitive controls. Slide To Play praised the game's controls but criticized the game's camera, expressing that "you don't have much chance to see what is to the left or right of you" due to the camera following the dogs. Multiplayer.it called the game "lively and light-hearted" and "deep and enjoyable", but expressed that the inability to control the camera impeded gameplay.
