= Disney Mobile =

Disney's mobile app division

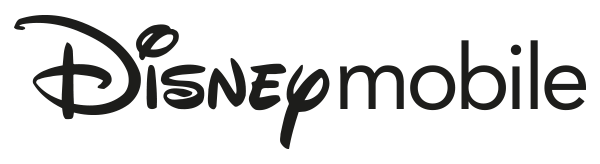
- Type: In-name only unit of Disney Interactive.
- Industry: Video games
- Founded: October 2, 2000; 26 years ago
- Headquarters: Palo Alto, California, U.S.
- Key people: Bart Decrem (GM)
- Products: Mobile video games Apps
- Brands: Club Penguin; Where's My Water?; Tsum Tsum
- Services: Wireless
- Number of employees: 50
- Parent: Disney Interactive
- Divisions: Starwave Mobile

Disney Mobile is an American division of Disney Consumer Products, which is in itself a division of The Walt Disney Company, that designs mobile games and apps, content and services.

== History ==
In August 2000, Walt Disney Internet Group (WDIG) entered the mobile content market in Japan with an agreement with NTT DoCoMo to launch the Disney-i content service. In November 2003, WDIG and Index Corporation agreed to "develop and distribute Disney-branded mobile content for the Chinese market" and that Index would, in conjunction with China Mobile, work to launch the Disney Mobile service. Walt Disney Internet Group launched DisneyMobile.com in December 2003 as a portal for Disney Mobile content.

Starting in January 2004, WDIG licensed Disney Mobile content to KPN, a prominent Dutch telecom firm. In March 2004, WDIG agreed to a licensing deal with Vodafone to provide Disney Mobile services in 14 countries: Australia, Egypt, Germany, Greece, Hungary, Ireland, Italy, Malta, The Netherlands, New Zealand, Portugal, Spain, Sweden, and Switzerland. Also in 2004, Disney re-activated the Starwave identity as Starwave Mobile, which publishes casual games for mobile phones for non-Disney brands within Disney's conglomerate or from third parties.

Sprint and Disney had previously launched a phone service for sports fans using content from Disney's sports channel, ESPN, branded Mobile ESPN.

The company, that worked with Sprint, started a mobile virtual network operator in the United States, which launched in June 2006. Earlier, DMobile and O2 agreed to a mobile virtual network operator agreement in April 2006 for the United Kingdom. In August 2006, DMobile halted its plans to roll out its wireless service in the UK, citing "adverse changes in the retail environment for its decision".

In September 2007, DMobile stopped signing up new wireless customers and discontinued the wireless service altogether on December 31, 2007. DMobile decided to shift its strategy by licensing its mobile suite, Family Center, and its content to other providers. However, in November 2007, Disney Japan and Softbank announced a wireless service joint venture, Disney Mobile, to be launched in 2008.

In July 2010, Disney purchased Tapulous to increase available mobile expertise. In 2011, Bart Decrem of Tapulous was appointed general manager of DMobile.

Launched September 22, 2011, Where's My Water?, a mobile game, starring Swampy the alligator - the first Disney original mobile character - rivaled Angry Birds for 20 days in October 2011, even becoming the top mobile game on the iTunes bestseller charts for a short time. This has led to a YouTube channel with a web series for Swampy. Where's My Water? has inspired several spin-offs, including “Where's My Perry?” and “Where's My Mickey?”. Also launched by DMobile in September 2011 was Puffle Launch, a mobile version of the game played on Club Penguin. In October 2011, working with Spin Master, DMobile launched the Disney AppMATes game with Cars 2 toys that interact with an iPad screen, turning it in to what the publisher called a "virtual play mat". The MAT (Mobile Application Toy) has to be held in contact with three touchpads (positioned on the windows either side) that then allow the touchscreen to orient the car via the use of conductive pads on the bottom. There are also light-tubes that allow the app to light up the car's headlights and a light on top.

With a decrease in venture capital flowing into game companies, Disney Interactive, including Disney Mobile, has been able to find co-development partners easier. This co-development model has lifted Disney to have 11 games among the 200 most-downloaded. Disney Mobile teamed up with Imangi Studios to release a version of Temple Run based on the film Brave, titled Temple Run: Brave. DMobile teamed up with developer Hipster Whale to release Disney Crossy Road on April 6, 2016, which in two days became the top downloaded game on iOS.

== Wireless ==
In the US, Disney Mobile operated on Sprint's CDMA network. Disney handled the administrative side and marketed the service to family subscribers.

Disney Mobile's offerings included Family Center suite, a multiple family-friendly applications to help parents manage their family's mobile phone experience. The innovative family monitor and call control features allowed parents to set spending limits and decide when the phone could and couldn't be used. The family locator service allowed parents to use GPS to locate their child's phone. There was also a family alert feature that let the whole family send text messages to each other.

Disney and Sprint had hoped that Disney Mobile content and applications would help drive demand for data services.

== Game support ==
Disney Mobile is well known for producing a myriad of games for iOS and Android, but due to the limitations of its support team, it must discontinue old games before releasing new ones. Some games, such as Where's My Water? will continue to be supported indefinitely.

=== Related developers ===
- Rovio Entertainment
- Outfit7
- Kongregate
- Jam City
- Kabam

== Executives ==
- George Grobar, senior vice president and General manager (2005–2008)
- Bart Decrem, General manager (2011–present)

== See also ==
- SoftBank Mobile
- NTT Docomo
