= Black Bart =

Black Bart may refer to:

== People ==
- Bartholomew Roberts (1682–1722), Welsh pirate
- Black Bart (outlaw) (1829–after 1888), English-American outlaw
- Black Bart (wrestler) (1948–2025), stage name of American professional wrestler Rick Harris

== Other uses ==
- Black Bart (film), a 1948 western film based on the life of the outlaw
- Black Bart (theatre), a musical theater group
- Black Bart (TV series), an unaired television pilot based on the film Blazing Saddles
