= Where's My Water? =

2011 video game

- Developer: Creature Feep
- Publisher: Disney Mobile
- Director: Tim Fitzrandolph
- Composer: David Luis Ortega
- Platforms: iOS; Android; Windows Phone; Windows; Mac OS X; BlackBerry 10; Kindle Fire; NetCast; Firefox OS; Adobe Flash
- Release: September 22, 2011
- Genre: Puzzle
- Mode: Single-player

Where's My Water? is a 2011 puzzle video game developed by American studio Creature Feep and published by Disney Mobile, a subsidiary of Disney Interactive Studios. It was released for iOS, Android, Kindle Fire, Windows, Windows Phone, Mac OS X, BlackBerry 10, NetCast, and Firefox OS operating systems, and Adobe Flash. The game has its players route a supply of water to an alligator. Where's My Water? has been praised for its gameplay and its graphical style, with special recognition of its lead character, Swampy, the first original Disney character for its mobile game portfolio, voiced by actor Justin T. Bowler.

The game has inspired multiple spin-offs including: Where's My Perry?, Where's My Mickey?, Where's My Water? featuring XYY Where's My Valentine?, Where's My Holiday?, and Where's My Summer?. This game was also released for Windows computers in 2011. More mobile versions continued to be released through 2013. In September 2013, a sequel titled Where's My Water? 2 was released. This game was released on Mac OS X devices through the Mac App Store in November 2014.

== Gameplay ==
Swampy, an alligator living in a city sewer system, hates being dirty. Whenever he tries to take a bath, a big alligator named Cranky disrupts the water flow to Swampy's home. Located somewhere on the level is a supply of water, either a finite amount pooled at various locations or an infinite amount flowing from a pipe. Players use the touch screen on their device to dig through the dirt and redirect the water towards an inlet leading to Swampy's bathtub. Occasionally, the water must be routed through other pipes or must interact with machines in order to open up a route to the inlet. When the required amount of water reaches the bathtub, the level is completed and the next level is unlocked. If all of the water flows away or turned into poison or mud, the player loses the level. Also scattered around the level are three rubber ducks that can be collected when they absorb an amount of water. Select levels also include items hidden in the dirt that will unlock bonus levels when three-item collections are completed.

Certain levels are also populated by hazards that must be avoided or removed. For example, some levels contain algae that will absorb water and grow. Other types of fluids will sometimes appear, such as purple poison, reddish mud, and green ooze. A single drop of poison will contaminate pure water, turning it into poison as well, while the ooze will erode through the dirt, pop balloons, and react with water, destroying both fluids. Mud eventually hardens into dirt, unless water reaches it, in which case the water turns to mud instantly. If either poison, ooze or mud reaches the inlet, the level will be lost and will automatically restart. In addition, bombs will destroy all of the objects and kill all of the rubber ducks on contact, while regular water kills Cranky Ducks, and poison kills the rest of the Ducks. However, poison and ooze will also destroy the invasive algae on contact. The poison will remove it, while the ooze will cause it to solidify, creating a rock—and they will react with each other explosively if they touch each other, potentially opening up parts of the level to the benefit or detriment of the player.

Points are awarded for the amount of time taken to complete the level, for collecting rubber ducks, and for delivering more than the minimum amount of water to Swampy's tub. Collecting a certain number of rubber ducks will also unlock new groups of levels.

=== Fluids ===
- Water is the first fluid seen in the game. Water approaching algae will cause more algae to grow. Any amount of water approaching poison will cause the water itself to become poison. Approaching with ooze will cause both fluids to dissolve. Approaching with mud will make the mud wet.
- Poisonous water, purple in color, is the second fluid encountered in the game. Any amount of poison approaching water will cause the water to become poison. Poison also removes algae. Approaching with ooze will cause an explosion.
- Ooze is the third fluid. It slowly eats through dirt. Approaching with water or mud will cause both fluids to dissolve. Approaching algae will transform the algae into stone. Approaching with poison will cause an explosion.
- Steam is the fourth fluid. Unlike the other fluids, steam floats upwards instead of falling.
- Mud is the fifth fluid. It gradually dries itself into dirt. Dry mud can be changed to wet mud by adding water, steam or poison. Approaching with ooze will cause both fluids to dissolve. However, dirt cannot be changed back to mud.

Other games change the fluids to fit the series' theme. For example, Where's My Mickey? depicts poisonous water as "Red Fizz".

== Development ==
Where's My Water? was developed by Creature Feep, a team of designers within the Disney Mobile division of Disney Interactive Studios. Creature Feep is headed up by game design director Tim FitzRandolph, whose earlier works included the popular game JellyCar that Disney would later acquire and distribute. In an October 2011 interview, FitzRandolph explained that the goal for the development of Where's My Water? was "to contribute a new character to the company, while making a really fun game in the process".

The earliest phase of development centered around the concept of the game, which was players using their fingers to guide water to a goal. According to FitzRandolph, "We had a whole bunch of ideas, and at some point along the line, it kept coming back that water, water was very fresh and people hadn't done a lot of physics around water." Designers invested time in making sure the water flowed naturally and as a player might expect it would in real life, thus making the gameplay easier to learn for newcomers. In actuality, the water is rendered as many individual "drops" that interact with each other.

The place players were routing water towards became a bathtub, at which point the designers had to devise a reason for having a bathtub underground. That reason came from the urban legend of alligators living in city sewers, so the game's lead character became a "hygiene-conscious alligator". Unlike many mobile games released by Disney, where characters from the company's films are used, Where's My Water? represents the first time that Disney has produced an original character for a mobile game. In designing that character, Disney Mobile wanted one "that felt like it belonged when lined up with other Disney characters".

=== Release ===
Where's My Water? was launched with four chapters – "Meet Swampy", "Troubled Waters", "Under Pressure" and "Sink or Swim"—each containing 20 levels. New chapters are rolled out with updates, each featuring new gameplay mechanics. An October 2011 update added "Change is Good", a 20-level expansion that added the ability to change fluid types from one to another in order to complete levels. "Boiling Point", the game's sixth 20-level chapter, was released in a November 2011 update and included levels where players must convert steam into liquid water. A version for devices equipped with the Android operating system was released on the Android Market in North America on November 23, 2011, and included all six chapters available up to that point.

In December 2011, "Stretched Thin" was released to both platforms, adding 20 new levels, a Christmas overlay for the title screen and new water balloon obstacles. A free, ad-supported version of Where's My Water? was also released to both iOS and Android in December 2011. The free version includes 25 unique levels, plus the ability to unlock five popular levels taken from the main game.

"Caution to the Wind", a new 20-level chapter, was launched in March 2012, adding fans and vacuums that move water and other game elements around the level. In April 2012, "Rising Tide" was added, which introduced valves that can redirect water and the other fluids as needed to complete the chapter's 20 levels. In May 2012, a total of 20 levels that originally appeared in the free version were added to the full version, collectively known as "The Lost Levels". The levels in question are grouped into two holiday-themed chapters, "10 Days of Swampy" (Christmas) and "Hearts and Crafts" (Valentine's Day). June 2012 saw the release of "Out to Dry", which included levels involving wet mud that sets into dirt. The update also included two new in-app purchases: the "Mystery Duck" mode (see below) and Locksmith Duck, which would unlock a chapter without having to collect a certain number of ducks within the main game. In connection, Where's My Perry, a version of the game featuring Perry the Platypus from Phineas and Ferb, was released the same day as the "Out to Dry" update. On September 19, 2012, a new update brought a special Birthday Level, "Make a Wish", to Where's My Water and Swampy's 1 Year Birthday. 10 more Lost Levels were also added for free. An infographic of Where's my Water's history teased a new update with a black-and-white and Frankenweenie-based levels.

=== Cranky's Story ===
In January 2012, "Cranky's Story", a new subset of levels within the game, was added initially to the iOS version and later to the Android version. The gameplay in "Cranky's Story" is basically the same as the main game, in that players must route a fluid to an inlet goal. However, this time the player must help Cranky by bringing the purple poisonous water into his lair to melt algae that is covering his food. This time, the ducks are now purple and can only be collected by being splashed with poison, while other fluids (including clean water) will kill it. If water or any of the other fluids enter the inlet, the level is failed (the water causes Cranky's food to be covered with more algae, surprising him, while ooze will turn it into a rock and being kicked away, the same is true with mud). If all of the poison is lost, then Cranky will get very angry. The first five levels in the first chapter, "Cranky's First Course", are free to play, while the rest of the chapter and the whole the second chapter, "Hunger Pains", are accessible through a one-time in-app purchase. The update also includes "Cranky's Challenge", a set of 12 challenges and four bonus stages for the player to accomplish. If those challenges are failed, then Swampy will mope down in disappointment. An all new Food Groups and the third episode "Bulking Up" were released on April 5, 2012, and adds 6 challenges and two bonus stages. The final episode, "Overstuffed", was released on May 18, 2012. Cranky is also voiced by Justin T. Bowler.

=== Mystery Duck ===
In June 2012, a new game mode called "Mystery Duck" was introduced. It is a revisit of previous levels from the main game except the player has to deal three special kinds of ducks. They are the Mega Duck, a large duck that requires a large amount of water to fill; Ducklings, a group of 10 tiny ducks (which can easily be filled with a drop of water); and the tuxedo-clad Mystery Duck, which goes around an entire level either by disappearing and reappearing in certain spots or physically moving up and down and side to side. Like "Cranky's Story", a one-time in-app purchase was required to play beyond the first five levels. On September 19, as part of the Birthday update, 40 more levels were added to Mystery Duck. On October 30, as part of the release of Swampy's Underground adventures, 20 more levels were added to Mystery duck. On November 15, as part of the levels of the week, the last 40 levels were added to Mystery Duck.

=== Allie's Story ===
On May 25, 2013, a new subset of levels called "Allie's Story" was added. Allie is an organ player and Swampy's girlfriend. The gameplay in this mode is the same as the other modes, but this time, it requires players to direct steam to operate Allie's makeshift pipe organ. Ducks are blue and can only be covered in steam, while other fluids (except clean water) will kill them. If water or other fluids get in the inlet, the level is failed. Only two episodes in this mode, "Warming Up" and "Tuning In" were available in the update. The last two chapters "Rising to the Top" and "Symphony in Steam" were added on September 11, 2013. As with Cranky's Story and Mystery Duck, a one-time in-app purchase is required to play beyond the first five levels. Allie is voiced by Rebecca Metz.

== Spin-offs ==
Disney has released several spin-off games under the Where's My moniker. They include:

- Where's My Perry? is a game starring Perry the Platypus from Phineas and Ferb, who needs water to enter in the O.W.C.A. HQ.
  - Game modes include Doofenshmirtz Evil Incorporated, and for three other O.W.C.A. agents.
- Where's My Mickey? (released June 19, 2013) is a game starring Mickey Mouse (as seen in the Disney Channel shorts) who needs water for his lemonade stand, putting out a sentient fire, and for his budding plant.
  - Game modes include two extra Mickey packs, "A Glass Half Empty!" and "The Menace of Venice", as well as two packs – "Shipwrecked!" and "Van Goofy" – featuring Goofy instead.
- Where's My Holiday? (December 1, 2012 – January 21, 2013) was a Christmas themed game starring Swampy and Perry. The game was free and included six levels for both characters as demos for Where's My Water? and Where's My Perry?.
- Where's My Valentine? (released February 1, 2013) is another game starring Swampy and Perry, this time themed around Valentine's Day. It was technically released as an update for Where's My Holiday? and replaced the levels, icons, and other visuals
- Where's My Summer? (released May 23, 2013) is a summer-themed game starring Perry. Instead of Swampy, there are twelve Perry levels.
- Where's My Water? featuring XYY (April 2014) is the localised version of the Chinese game Where's My XiYangYang? (November 2013) and stars characters from the popular Chinese cartoon Pleasant Goat and Big Big Wolf. The game was retired on August 29, 2014. Both Where's My XiYangYang? and Where's My Water? featuring XYY were developed by ATH Interactive Studio instead of Creature Feep.

== Reception ==
Reception

Aggregate score
Aggregator	Score
Metacritic	iOS: 90/100

Review scores
Publication	Score
IGN	iOS: 9.0/10
Gamezebo	iOS: 5/5
Slide To Play	iOS: 4/4
TouchArcade	iOS: 4.5/5

Where's My Water? has received universal acclaim from critics. Mike Thompson of Gamezebo said "anyone who enjoys physics puzzle titles would be out of their mind to miss picking this up". IGN's Justin Davis said players "will have a ton of fun figuring out how to get Swampy clean level after level". Chris Reed, writing for Slide To Play, called the game "a highly polished and appealing physics puzzler that nearly everyone can enjoy". Along with the gameplay, reviewers have made special mention of the game's graphical presentation. Gamezebo said the graphics "are particularly great, featuring crisp and cartoon-like visuals that look like something out of ... well, out of a Disney cartoon", and IGN said that Swampy "animates wonderfully and always appears incredibly adorable". Pocket Gamer's Steve McCaskill praised its visual design, stating that it gave "the impression of an interactive cartoon".

After only one day on Apple's U.S. App Store, Where's My Water? ascended to the top of the list of paid apps, surpassing Angry Birds. In its first month of release, Where's My Water? was downloaded more than one million times. The game remained on top of the App Store charts for three weeks, and it has also reached No. 1 on App Stores in 30 other countries. In March 2012, Apple announced that a copy of the free version of Where's My Water?, downloaded by a user from China, was the 25 billionth application downloaded from the App Store. Pocket Gamer awarded it Best Casual/Puzzle Game in 2012 During WWDC 2012, the app was awarded a 2012 "Apple Design Award" for iPhone apps. During the 15th Annual Interactive Achievement Awards, the Academy of Interactive Arts & Sciences nominated Where's My Water? for "Casual Game of the Year".

=== Impact ===
The popularity of Where's My Water?, and of Swampy in particular, has led Disney to develop a web series based on Swampy and other characters introduced in the game's cutscenes, including Allie, a female alligator who is the object of both Swampy's and Cranky's affection. Where's My Water?: Swampy's Underground Adventures debuted with a teaser August 31, 2012 on the Disney.com website and featured a 12-episode season, each episode running around two minutes. The series is animated by Animax Entertainment. According to Mark Walker, the senior vice-president of Disney.com, the series would "build out the world and tell Swampy's story and that of other characters".

== See also ==
- List of most downloaded Android applications
- Diggin' Dogs, a 2012 game with a similar digging mechanic
