= Bart Forbes =

American painter

Bart Forbes (born July 3, 1939 in Altus, Oklahoma) is an American painter and illustrator. He has worked for most of the popular magazines, amongst them Time, Sports Illustrated, Ladies' Home Journal, McCall's and Golf Digest, as well as a broad selection of corporate clients. His works include postage stamps for the US Postal Service, Time magazine's Man of the Year article on Jimmy Carter, paintings of the 1988 Seoul Olympics, theme paintings for the PGA tournaments and club houses and paintings of the Dallas Cowboys for Jerry Jones' private jet. He was the recipient of the 1986 Sport Artist of the Year Award given annually by the American Sport Art Museum and Archives. The Sports Art of Bart Forbes, a collection of his most famous sports paintings, was published by Beckett in 1998. He was inducted into the Society of Illustrators Hall of Fame in 2017.

Bart and his wife, Mary Jo were married July 26, 1969. Their son, Ted Forbes, is the creator and host of the YouTube vlog, The Art of Photography. Their daughter, Sarah Radicello, is a graphic designer.

== Career ==
Bart Forbes is a painter–illustrator who has worked over a 55+ year period. He is well-known for his loose painterly, yet realistic style of work which, in the 1970s and 1980s, was regularly reproduced to accompany stories for McCall's, Redbook, Ladies' Home Journal and other popular women's magazines. At that time, a number of limited edition prints were published including male and female golfers, the endangered species series and images of Native Americans among others.

== Sports art ==
As Forbes' career progressed and women's magazines adopted a smaller size format, most often without short stories, his focus shifted to the world of sport with commissions from Sports Illustrated, Time and the National Football League. In 1987, he was commissioned by the Korean Olympic Committee to be their official artist for the 1988 Seoul Olympics. Several of the resultant images were reproduced in a series of limited editions prints as well.

== Gallery work and fine art ==
Over the years, requests for large paintings necessitated that Forbes change medium from water color to oil, but his style retained its original loose, washy quality. In 2005, 2006 and 2007 TPC Sawgrass in Ponte Vedra Beach, Florida, commissioned Forbes to do a number of mural-size paintings of legendary golf moments and players from the Players Championship tournaments. He is currently still painting commissioned work along with landscape paintings for sale in galleries.
