= Where's My Perry? =

2012 video game

Where's my Perry?
- Developer: Creature Feep
- Publisher: Disney Mobile
- Platforms: iOS, Android, BlackBerry OS, Windows Phone
- Release: iOS: CAN: June 28, 2012
- Mode: Single player

Where's My Perry? is a puzzle video game spin-off of Where's My Water? themed after Phineas and Ferb and featuring Perry the Platypus. It was developed by Creature Feep and published by Disney Mobile, a subsidiary of Disney Interactive Studios. The game was released on June 28, 2012, for iOS; on July 18, 2012, for Android, and on December 10, 2013, for Windows Phone. It was also available for BlackBerry 10 operating system. As of December 2017, it is no longer available due to Disney making new ones. The game contains fully voiced dialogue and cutscenes, with the voice actors from the original series (Dan Povenmire, Jeff "Swampy" Marsh, Tyler Alexander Mann, and Dee Bradley Baker) reprising their roles.

== Gameplay ==
The gameplay of Where's My Perry? is likely similar to Where's My Water?, where the player has to guide water down to Perry through pipes in order to complete the level. This is done by erasing ground with the touchscreen. Not all of the water has to reach Perry, but in levels with limited water, if you run out of water, the level fails and restarts. This can be caused by the water touching dangerous substances, Inators, or going off-screen. If dangerous substances reach Perry, this will also fail and restart the level. All of the main levels also require the player to collect gnomes to unlock the next set. There are also various gimmicks, some returning from the predecessor and some new.

The game has two other game modes; Doofenshmirtz Evil Incorporated, where Doofenshmirtz's levels require "evil" sludge (the game's version of poisonous water), turning various household objects into his mechanized, sentient minions of his likeness. With three other agents – Terry the Turtle, Peter the Panda and Pinky the Chihuahua – coming together to fight back, the O.W.C.A. levels combine previous mechanics and introduce Doofenshmirtz's newest Inator, which can change dirt into water and vice versa.

== Reception ==
Reception

Aggregate score
Aggregator	Score
Metacritic	84/100

Where's My Perry? received "generally favorable" reviews from critics, according to the review aggregation website Metacritic. While 148Apps gave the app an overall rating of 4 stars, the reviewer said "...I can't help feeling Where's My Perry? is a little too close to Where's My Water? to earn top marks. As a sequel it's more than solid, just download prepared for more of what you know and love, not a new experience." Slide To Play gave it a rating of 3+ (good), saying "Simply put, Where's My Perry? is a very good game, whether you're a fan of Where's My Water? or a fan of Phineas and Ferb. And if you're a fan of both? Then there is no reason for you not to have this game." Gamezebo gave it 4½ stars.

== See also ==
- List of most downloaded Android applications
