= Eggo =

Brand of frozen waffles

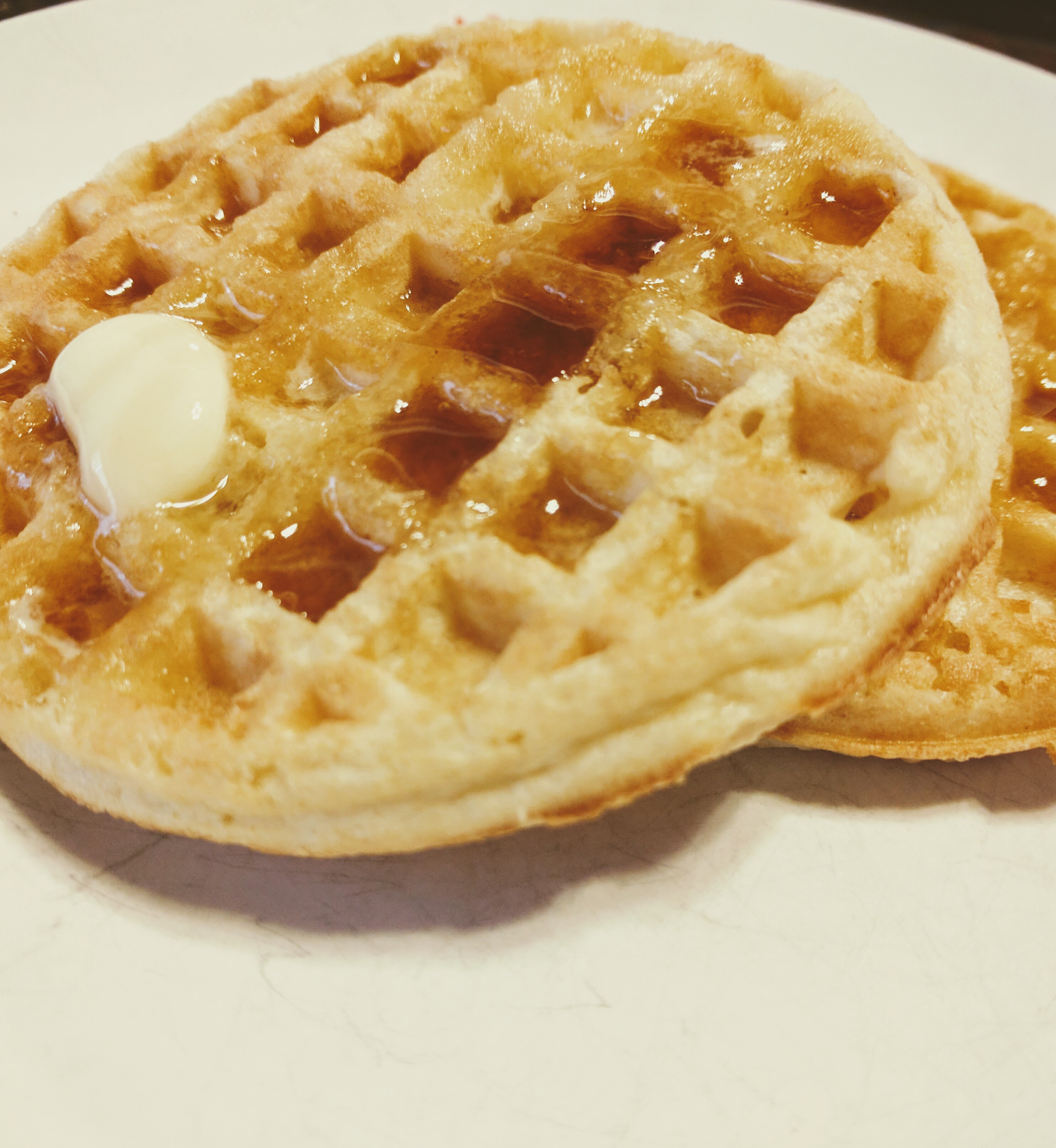
- Product type: Waffle, pancake
- Current owner: Mars Inc.
- Produced by: Kellanova
- Country: U.S.
- Introduced: 1953; 73 years ago
- Previous owners: Kellogg Company (until 2023)
- Website: www.leggomyeggo.com

Nutritional info
Nutritional value per 2 waffles (70 g)
- Energy: 190 kcal (790 kJ)
- Carbohydrates: 27 g
- Sugars: 2 g
- Fat: 7 g
- Saturated: 2 g
- Trans: 0 g
- Protein: 4 g
- Other constituents: Quantity
- Cholesterol: 15 mg
- ^{†}Percentages estimated using US recommendations for adults.

Eggo is a brand of frozen waffles owned by Kellanova (formerly the Kellogg Company), and sold in North America. Several varieties are available, including homestyle, miniature, cherry, blueberry, strawberry, vanilla bliss, brown sugar cinnamon, apple cinnamon, buttermilk, chocolate chip, and Thick & Fluffy.

Other than waffles, Eggo also produces a selection of pancakes, French toast, and egg and cheese breakfast sandwiches, of which varieties include ham or sausage.

By mid-June 2009, Eggo had a 73% share of the frozen waffle market in the United States.

== History ==
Eggo waffles were invented in 1953 by the American inventor Frank Dorsa, who developed a process by which waffles could be cooked, frozen, and packaged for consumers.

The name “Eggo” was derived from Dorsa's first product, “Eggo Mayonnaise”. The brand was later applied to waffle mix, potato chips, and eventually to the frozen waffle for which it is primarily known today.

All of the products were produced at a sprawling plant and factory on Eggo Way in San Jose, California, near the intersection of US 101 and East Julian Street. The Dorsas were very involved in local community activities and donated extensively to school and community projects. For Halloween, instead of candy, Tony Dorsa would give out bags of Eggo potato chips to trick-or-treaters.

In 1968, as a means of diversification, the Kellogg Company purchased Eggo. Their advertising slogan—"L'eggo my Eggo"—developed by Leo Burnett in 1972 is well known through their television commercials. Due to similarity between the contraction leggo and the product name Lego, in the later 2000s Kellogg's collaborated with The Lego Group to produce Eggo waffles shaped like Lego bricks.

In fall 2009, there was a shortage of some Eggo products due to several problems. Among these were a listeria contamination which caused the Atlanta plant to be shut down for cleaning, severe flooding in the Atlanta area, and equipment repairs at the Kellogg plant in Rossville, Tennessee.

Kellogg's produces an Eggo brand breakfast cereal that was shaped to have the likeness of waffles. Flavors include maple syrup and cinnamon toast. It was originally produced from 2006 to 2012, but after a popular campaign was reintroduced in 2019.

In 2016, the Netflix series Stranger Things featured Eggo waffles as a key story beat bringing the brand to global attention beyond the countries where the brand is sold. In the show, they are the favorite food of the character Eleven.

== See also ==
- List of frozen food brands
