= Bart Tobener =

American racecar driver

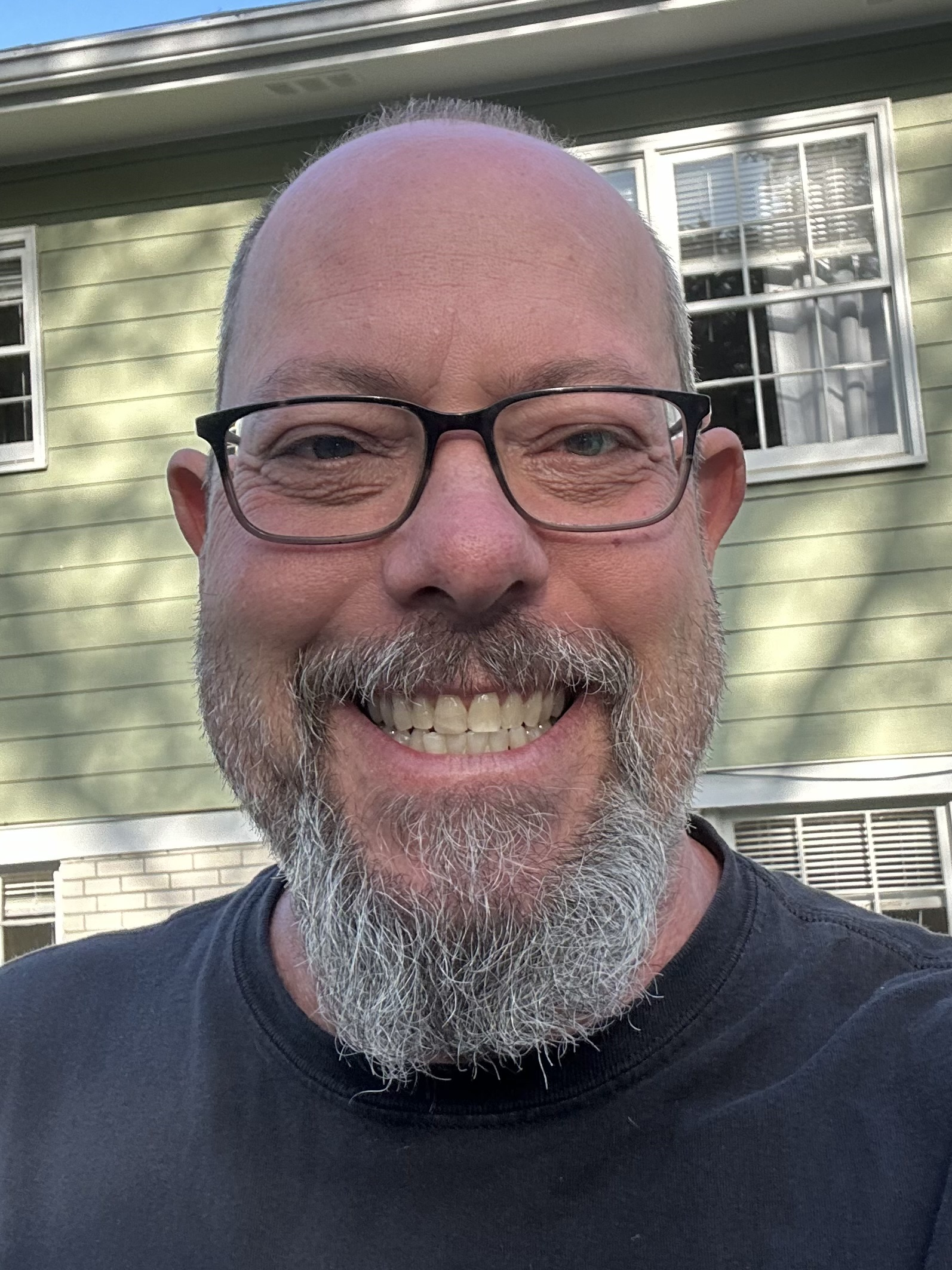
- Tobener in 2024
- Nationality: American
- Full name: Barton David Tobener
- Born: 28 April 1970 (age 56) Fort Lauderdale, Florida, U.S.
- Retired: 2022
- Debut season: 1998
- Categorisation: NHRA
- Years active: 1998–2022
- Teams: Tobener Motorsports
- Car number: 4214
- Former teams: Team UPR; Team Vortech; Team Diablosport; Tobener Motorsports
- Wins: 43

Previous series
- 1991–2009; 1999–2022; 2005–2022; 2012–2022: FFW; NMRA; NMCA; RTRA

Barton David Tobener (/ˈtoʊb.nər/ TOHB-nər; born April 28, 1970) is an American former racing driver. He was active from 1998 to 2022. He is known for his achievements in drag racing.

== Racing career ==
Tobener began racing as a teenager, initially with mini import trucks before transitioning to motorcycles. Early track time at Moroso Motorsports Park in Florida helped cultivate his interest in motorsports. His career progressed at UPR Products, where he worked as a mechanic and developed skills in engine building and tuning under the mentorship of Mark Mainiero.

Competing in events organized by the National Mustang Racers Association (NMRA) and the National Muscle Car Association (NMCA), Tobener earned multiple victories and championships, gaining recognition for his performance and dedication. In 2014, he became the first driver to record a seven-second pass in the NMRA Edelbrock Renegade class, securing the championship that year. He was also an early adopter of Holley EFI technology, which contributed to his success.

Tobener later founded Tobener Motorsports, a performance shop offering upgrades, parts, and consulting services.
