= Bart Exposito =

American painter

Bart Exposito (born 1970, in Texas, US) is an artist based in Los Angeles. He paints geometric images in a graphic design style.

Exposito's work has appeared in a number of shows including “Game Over” at Galerie Grimm/Rosenfeld in Munich and “Wake Up & Apologise” at the Hayworth Gallery, Los Angeles. He has exhibited internationally at galleries such as Studio 9, London and Galerie Fur Gegenwarstkunst, Bremen.
