= Bart Taminiau =

Field hockey player

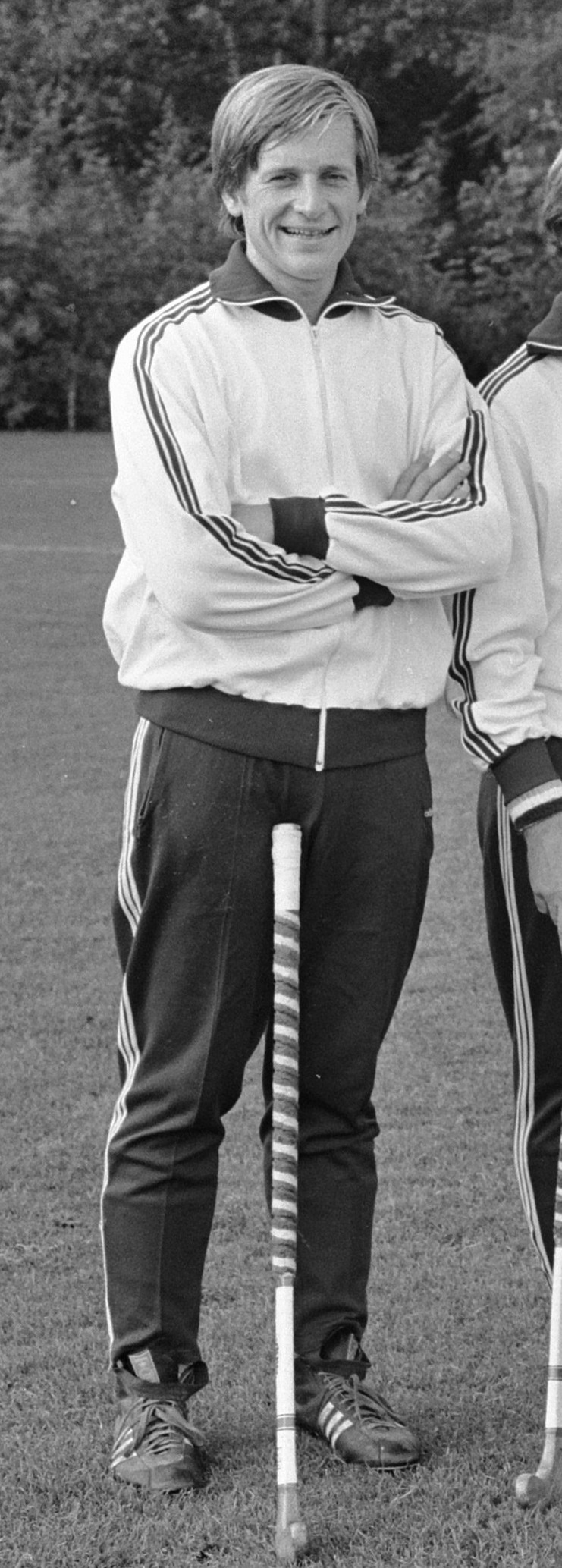
- Taminiau in 1974

Personal information
- Born: 27 March 1947 (age 79) Tilburg, the Netherlands
- Height: 1.83 m (6 ft 0 in)
- Weight: 79 kg (174 lb)

Sport
- Sport: Field hockey
- Club: TMHC, Tilburg
Medal record
Representing the Netherlands
Hockey World Cup
Gold medal – first place	1973 Amsterdam	Team

Bernardus Philippus Wilhelmus Maria "Bart" Taminiau (born 27 March 1947) is a retired field hockey player from the Netherlands. He competed at the 1972 and 1976 Olympics, where his teams finished in fourth place on both occasions.

Between 1970 and 1978 Taminiau played 87 international matches and scored 4 goals, two of them at the 1973 World Cup, which was won by the Netherlands.
