= Bart Schilperoord =

Dutch cricketer

Personal information
- Full name: Bart Schilperoord
- Born: 11 November 1982 (age 44); Schiedam, South Holland, Netherlands
- Batting: Right-handed
- Role: Wicket-keeper

Career statistics
Competition	First-class
Matches	1
Runs scored	42
Batting average	21.00
100s/50s	–/–
Top score	27
Catches/stumpings	3/–
- Source: Cricinfo, 8 February 2022

Bart Schilperoord (born 11 November 1982) is a Dutch former first-class cricketer.

Schilperoord was born at Schiedam. A club cricketer for Hermes DVS, He made a single appearance in first-class cricket for the Netherlands against Canada in the Intercontinental Cup at Rotterdam in July 2009, replacing retired wicket-keeper Jeroen Smits. Batting twice in the match, he was dismissed for 15 runs in the Dutch first innings by Zameer Zahir, while in their second innings he was dismissed for 27 runs by the same bowler. As wicket-keeper, he took one catch and one stumping. He was later selected in the Dutch squad for their Intercontinental Cup fixture against Scotland in June 2010, but did not feature in the starting eleven.
