= Frank Dorsa =

American food inventor

- Education: San Jose High School
- Known for: Eggo frozen waffle

Frank Joseph Dorsa (August 18, 1907 – January 17, 1996) was an American food machinery inventor, best known for the Eggo frozen waffle.

== Early life ==
Dorsa was born and raised in San Jose, California. His formal education ended with San Jose High School.

== Career ==
His first job after graduation was as a machinist at a small company, later bought by Los Gatos-founded FMC Corporation.

In 1932, the Dorsa brothers developed a mayonnaise—branded “Eggo Mayonnaise”— noted for its use of "100 percent fresh ranch eggs" and "triple refined vegetable oil".

After mayonnaise, with an infusion of $50, Dorsa branched out to waffle batter. When the waffle batter popularity exceeded the area to which it could be transported fresh, they developed a dry waffle mix that required only the addition of milk. Dorsa's younger brothers, Sam, and Anthony (Antonino), handled sales and deliveries.

In 1938, they acquired the Santa Clara, California Garden City Potato Chip factory, making Eggo potato chips. For the potato chip factory, Dorsa developed a continuous potato peeler. Eggo expanded, to include salad dressings, noodles, and pretzels.

Frank invented a fryer that wouldn't curl bacon.

In 1953, Frank invented a carousel-motor-powered machine that would cook waffles and then freeze them. Dorsa named the product Eggo frozen waffle.

In 1966, the Dorsas sold Eggo to Fearn Foods Inc., which was acquired by Kellogg's in 1970.

== Family ==
Frank Dorsa married Evelyn Mary Denevan in 1938. They had three sons, Frank Jr., Stanley and Richard.
