= Bart Decrem =

American entrepreneur

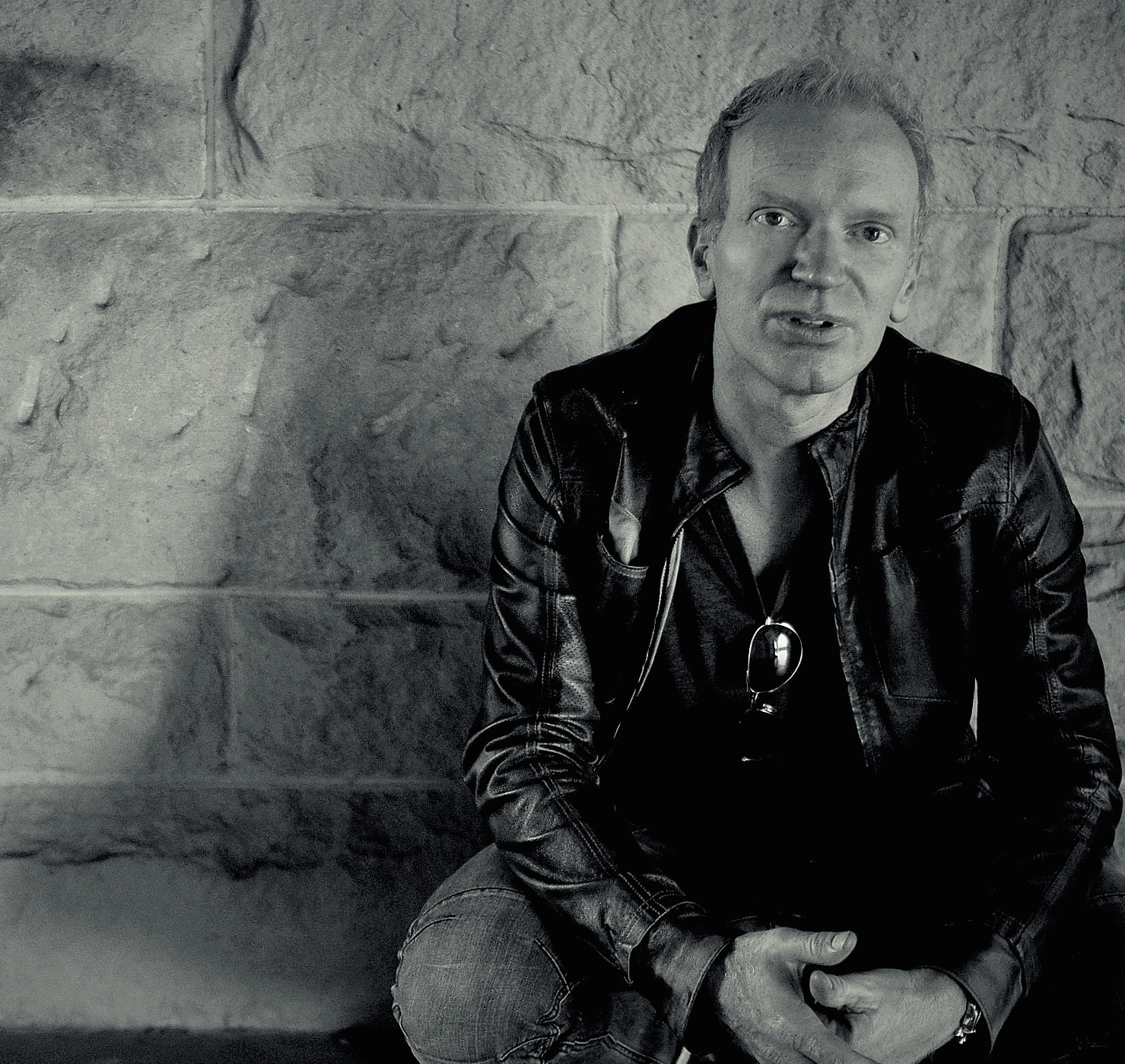
- Bart Decrem in 2015
- Born: Belgium
- Occupation(s): SVP and General Manager, Mobile Games, at The Walt Disney Company (July 2010 - July 2013), Founder and CEO Tapulous, Entrepreneur In Residence DCM, Founder and CEO Flock, Inc, Head of marketing, business affairs Mozilla Foundation, Co-Founder Eazel, Founder and Executive Director Plugged In (publication)

Bart Decrem is a Silicon Valley entrepreneur who, most recently, headed the Mobile Games business for The Walt Disney Company between July 2010 and the Fall of 2013. He was born and raised in Belgium.

== Early life ==
His first entrepreneurial venture was at the age of 13, when he started a weekly magazine for Belgium's leading underground radio station while working as a DJ there. Decrem moved to the US to study law at Stanford University. After graduation, Decrem founded Plugged In, a non-profit organization in East Palo Alto that provided community members with Internet access and related educational programs. Plugged In was one of the first such Digital Divide programs in the United States.

== Career ==
In 1999, Decrem co-founded Eazel, an open source Linux desktop start-up. Their software, Nautilus, continues to be popular among Linux users. Among other projects, he coordinated the creation of the GNOME Foundation. After Eazel shut down in 2001, Decrem spent 18 months in Seoul, doing business development for several local startups.

In 2003–2004, Decrem headed marketing and business affairs for the Mozilla Foundation. He coordinated Firefox marketing activities, including branding, the Firefox 1.0 launch and the creation of Spread Firefox, the community marketing effort for Firefox. He also headed up partnerships with Google, Yahoo, Amazon and Mozilla. His work for Mozilla was sponsored by Mitch Kapor’s Open Source Applications Foundation.

After leaving Mozilla, he started Flock, a startup building a social web browser. Angel investors in Flock included Josh Kopelman, Gil Penchina, Joe Kraus, Scott Kurnit, Stratton Sclavos and others. VC investors included Bessemer Venture Partners, Catamount Ventures and Shasta Ventures. He was Flock’s CEO through its Series C, and left the company in the Summer of 2006.

In 2007, Decrem worked as an Entrepreneur In Residence at DCM (Doll Capital Management).

In January, 2008, Bart Decrem was Founder and CEO at Tapulous, one of the first iPhone startups. Andrew Lacy was the Co-Founder at Tapulous. Tapulous is the company behind Tap Tap Revenge one of the first major game hits on the App Store.

In April, 2009, comScore announced that Tap Tap Revenge was the most popular App Store app of all times on the occasion on Apple’s announcement of the first one billion app downloads. At that time, according to comScore, Tap Tap Revenge was installed on 32% of all iPhones in the United States of America.

In July, 2010 Tapulous was acquired by The Walt Disney Company.

From July 2010 until June 2013 he was SVP and General Manager for Disney Mobile Games, the group behind the smartphone hits Where’s My Water, Temple Run: Oz and Where’s My Mickey.

Decrem was recognized as one of the fifty most creative people in business in 2009 by Fast Company, and one of the 10 most creative people in the Music Biz by Fast Company, He has also been featured in Advertising Age's "2010 Creativity 50" by Creativity.
