= Tap Tap Revenge =

2008 video game

- Tap Tap Revenge App Store icon
- Developer: Tapulous
- Publisher: Tapulous
- Designers: Louie Mantia, Tino Bedi
- Platform: iOS
- Release: WW: July 11, 2008
- Genre: Music
- Modes: Single-player, multiplayer

Tap Tap Revenge (also known as Tap Tap Revenge Classic) was a music game created by Nate True, and developed and published by Tapulous for iOS in July 2008. It is the first game in Tapulous' Tap Tap series.

Development for the game began prior to the release of the iPhone SDK, and was originally entitled Tap Tap Revolution. The goal of the game is to tap each of the colored balls when they reach a line at the bottom of the screen. If the ball is hit on the beat, the player gains points, but if not, it counts as a miss. There are also "shakes", which require the player to move the iPhone, iPod Touch or iPad (although the game was designed for the former two) to the right, left, or middle.

The game's reception was generally positive, and it became the most downloaded free game of the App Store for 2008.

The game was followed by Tap Tap Revenge 2, Tap Tap Revenge 3 and Tap Tap Revenge 4.

In 2010, the game series and its parent company were acquired by Disney. Via a post on their Facebook page, as of February 2014 the game has been removed from the App Store by owner Disney and it no longer plans to support the game.

== Gameplay ==
The game was modeled after Konami's popular Dance Dance Revolution series gameplay. Players use their fingers to tap colored balls when they reach the bottom of the screen. The goal is to hit the balls at the correct time (as dictated by the beat of the song), and thus gain points. "Shakes", represented as on-screen arrows follow the same pattern as the colored balls, but player input is recognized from a physical shake of the device in the proper direction (right, left, or back). Following the end of a song, the point scores is recorded by the game, and the user has the ability to upload and compare their score online with other players.

A combination of correct touches by the player results in extra points, and after a certain point, a "Revenge mode" is available for use. The player must physically shake the device to activate the mode.

The game features both single-player and multiplayer modes, whereas both modes are only accessible via the same physical device. While the game initially features one set of playable songs, more songs can be downloaded from within the game. The game features four difficulty levels, and most songs are available for specifically one difficulty level.

== Development and history ==
On September 11, 2007 Nate True released Tap Tap Revolution (named after, and based on, the popular music game series Dance Dance Revolution) for iOS via his personal blog. The game pre-dated the release of the iOS SDK, and players were required to jailbreak their iPhone to play the game. The game had been developed by True within a two-day time span. Soon after that release came a new user interface from Tino Bedi (Doc). and the ability to play songs from your iTunes library and share tap tracks in the cloud. It soon became one of the most popular games for jailbroken iPhones, and received media attention.

On July 8, 2008, True announced that the game would be released in the App Store at launch as a revamped game under the Tap Tap Revenge name. He also announced that the game had been bought by startup company Tapulous, and that he was hired as a developer. After the release of the sequel, Tap Tap Revenge 2, Tapulous re-released the title as Tap Tap Revenge Classic.

On February 5, 2014, Tapulous announced the Tap Tap Revenge franchise will come to a halt and every single server be shut down, and all the Tap Tap Revenge games will no longer be downloadable on the App Store.

== Reception ==
Reception

Review score
Publication	Score
Eurogamer	7/10

Award
Publication	Award
TechCrunch	Best Time Sink Site/Application (2008)

By July 31, 2008, 20 days after its initial release, the game approached 1 million downloads. The total installed iPhone OS 2.0 user base was 5-6 million. Tapulous also announced that they were in talks with Indie and major musicians to release purchasable sequels for the game. In December, Apple announced that the game was the second-most downloaded free application of the year from their App Store, and the most downloaded free game. In April 2009, internet marketing research company comScore announced the results of a study which claimed 1 in 3 U.S. iPhone OS users had downloaded the game, and that it was the most popular application for the iPhone and iPod Touch.

As part of the 2nd generation iPod Touch advertising campaign, Apple featured Tap Tap Revenge in print and television ads with the headline "The funnest iPod ever.".

== Sequels and spin-offs ==
The game spawned three direct sequels, Tap Tap Revenge 2, Tap Tap Revenge 3, and Tap Tap Revenge 4, as well as a set of spin-offs and artist-centric video games. The digital distribution of the Tap Tap series has over 15 million combined downloads.

=== Tap Tap Revenge 2 ===
Tap Tap Revenge 2 gameplay

On March 3, 2009, Tap Tap Revenge 2 was released. It became the most-downloaded free application on the App Store only three days after its release, and reached half a million downloads over that period.

=== Tap Tap Dance ===
Tap Tap Dance was released in December 2008, featuring electronic music from artists such as Daft Punk, Justice, Digitalism, and The Chemical Brothers. It was first to feature the rewritten OpenGL-based game engine that powered all subsequent games in the series, and introduced features such as special boss tracks for certain songs with custom visuals, along with core features like tap and hold notes. It was well-received critically, winning IGN's Best Music Game of 2008.

=== List of games ===
Name	Date Released
Tap Tap Revenge	July 11, 2008
Nine Inch Nails Revenge	October 31, 2008
Tap Tap Dance	December 4, 2008
Christmas with Weezer	December 4, 2008
Tap Tap Revenge 2	March 3, 2009
Tap Tap Coldplay	April 2, 2009
Dave Matthews Band Revenge	May 19, 2009
Lady Gaga Revenge	June 9, 2009
Tap Tap Revenge 3	October 6, 2009
Metallica Revenge	October 27, 2009
Kings of Leon Revenge	March 2, 2010
Justin Bieber Revenge	March 28, 2010
Tap Tap Radiation	April 1, 2010
Nirvana Revenge	May 12, 2010
Nickelback Revenge	June 26, 2010
Katy Perry Revenge	August 24, 2010
Linkin Park Revenge	September 15, 2010
Lady Gaga Revenge 2	November 17, 2010
Tap Tap Revenge 4	iOS: December 20, 2010 Android: March 30, 2011
Green Day Revenge	March 21, 2011
Bruno Mars Revenge	May 6, 2011
Born This Way Revenge	June 1, 2011
Tap Tap Glee	August 4, 2011
Tap Tap Muppets	November 17, 2011
Tap Tap Tour	July 6, 2012

== See also ==
- Tapulous
