= Phineas and Ferb Get Busted! =

- Phineas and Ferb episode
- Episode no.: Season 1 Episode 16
- Directed by: Dan Povenmire
- Written by: Bobby Gaylor (story); Martin Olson (story); Jon Colton Barry (storyboards); Piero Piluso (storyboards); Robert F. Hughes; Zac Moncrief
- Production code: 116
- Original air dates: February 16, 2009 (Disney XD); March 13, 2009 (Disney Channel)

Guest appearances
- Clancy Brown as the Drill Sergeant; Geraldo Rivera as Morty Williams

Episode chronology
← Previous "The Flying Fishmonger"	Next → "Greece Lightning"
- Phineas and Ferb (season 1)

"Phineas and Ferb Get Busted!" (broadcast outside the United States and Canada as "At Last") is the 16th episode, as well as the 45th broadcast episode of the first season of the animated television series Phineas and Ferb. The episode aired on Disney XD on February 16, 2009, and on Disney Channel on March 13, 2009, in the United States. The episode follows Phineas and Ferb finally being caught by their parents and sent to a reform school, where a harsh and cruel sergeant attempts to destroy their imagination by sitting them down to a commercial about good boys that mind-controlled them into the obedient drones. Candace along with Jeremy goes to save them after she sees a news report about their horrible condition.

The episode's story was written by the writing team Martin Olson and Bobby Gaylor and constructed into storyboard by Jon Colton Barry and Piero Piluso. Dan Povenmire, co-creator of Phineas and Ferb, directed it. Talk show personality Geraldo Rivera and veteran actor Clancy Brown guest star as television reporter Morty Williams and the school sergeant, respectively.

== Plot ==
External videos
- Phineas and Ferb Get Busted S1 E16 Full Episode Phineas and Ferb @disneyxd — Official upload of the episode onto YouTube

Phineas and Ferb rebuild their mother's station wagon into a flying car, called the "Flying Car of the Future, Today", and build a giant tower. Candace manages to show Linda, who is furious, and Phineas confesses that they've been doing similar things all summer. As Linda tearfully apologizes to Candace for not believing her, Lawrence goes outside and sees the tower. Linda asks Lawrence if he knows about what the boys did and he denies it. Candace suggests several different punishments to the boys, but Lawrence sees no harm in the project. The tower then collapses, destroying part of the house. Linda and Lawrence send the boys to the "Smile Away Reformatory School" run by a drill sergeant, unaware that it is a prison where kids are brainwashed to remove their creativity.

Candace enjoys fun activities with Stacy and Jeremy, but after a few days is bored and haunted by the sad consequences of busting Phineas and Ferb, realizing that she loves her brothers for their genius skills. She and Jeremy take the flying car to save her brothers, but damaged it while on the way. After several failed attempts to get into the school, they disguised themselves as reporter Morty Williams and his cameraman, which fools the Sergeant, allowing them to get into the school. Linda and Lawrence at the same time, conclude that the severity of their punishment was worse than it should've been, and they make the decision to have the boys taken out of the reform school. Once Jeremy and Candace get into the school, they escape with Phineas and Ferb.

The Sergeant sends his guards and attack dogs after them, now seeking to put Candace and Jeremy in the school as well, leading to a chase. Reaching the edge of a gorge, Candace tries to get Phineas and Ferb fix the flying car but as they appear to have lost their creativity from the brainwashing, Candace remorsefully breaks down and admits that she is proud to have them as her brothers, which snaps them out of their state. As they are cornered by the Sergeant, Perry the Platypus knock him off the cliff to his death using a giant robot spider as he battled with Dr. Doofenshmirtz. Soon after, Phineas and Ferb are juggling corn dogs, Linda and Lawrence turn into marionettes controlled by a giant Baljeet, who then turns into one as well, controlled by a giant talking zebra, and Jeremy proposes to Candace.

It turns out it was all a dream Candace was having all along and that the events of the episode never happened, which she tells her family at breakfast, even revealing Perry's secret identity. However, Major Monogram bursts in with an army of O.W.C.A. (Organization Without a Cool Acronym) agents to relocate Perry and mind-erase the Fletchers and Flynns. Perry then wakes up in Phineas's bed, with the events of the entire episode having all been a dream inside a dream. Phineas tells him to go back to sleep, which they both do.

== Voice cast ==
- Vincent Martella as Phineas Flynn
- Ashley Tisdale as Candace Flynn
- Thomas Sangster as Ferb Fletcher
- Caroline Rhea as Linda Flynn-Fletcher
- Richard O'Brien as Lawrence Fletcher
- Maulik Pancholy as Baljeet Tjinder
- Mitchel Musso as Jeremy Johnson
- Kelly Hu as Stacy Hirano
- Clancy Brown as the Drill Sergeant
- Geraldo Rivera as Morty Williams
- Jeff "Swampy" Marsh as Major Monogram

== Production ==
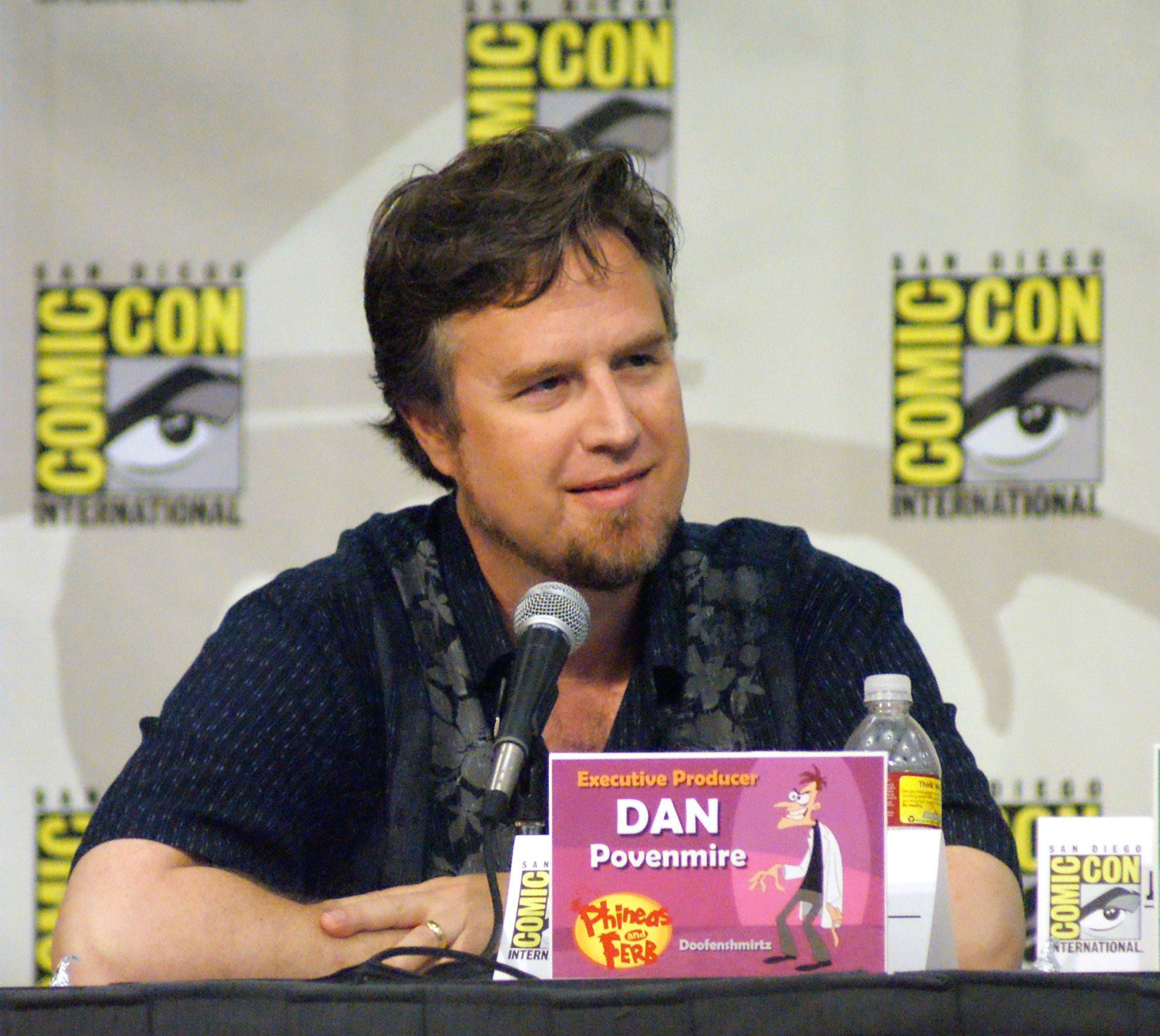
Series co-creator Dan Povenmire directed "Phineas and Ferb Get Busted".

"Phineas and Ferb Get Busted!" was written by Bobby Gaylor and Martin Olson as a story, but the storyboards were adapted and constructed by Jon Colton Barry and Piero Piluso. Robert F. Hughes and Zac Moncrief as well are apple credited for additionally writing for the episode. Dan Povenmire, the show's co-creator and executive producer, directed the episode.

The episode is titled "At Last" when broadcast outside the United States and Canada. Latin America labels the episode name in its end credits for the episode, despite entitling it "Al Fin"; however, "Al Fin" literally translates to "At Last."

Geraldo Rivera guest starred as the voice of investigative talk show host Morty Williams. Clancy Brown, known for his work in The Shawshank Redemption, and SpongeBob SquarePants provided the voice of the drill sergeant. "Phineas and Ferb Get Busted" was originally broadcast in America as the premiere of season two on Presidents' Day, February 16, 2009, on Disney XD, at 4:30 PM Eastern/Pacific Time. It was followed by first season reruns aired in a marathon.

== Reception ==
When the episode broadcast on Disney Channel on March 13, 2009, it garnered a total of 3.7 million viewers, 1.4 million of them ages 9–14. It was the series second most watched telecast, behind only "Flop Starz," and was the top-rated for Kids 6–11 in almost 6 months, ranking in Phineas and Ferb's top four most watched in the category. Moreover, it was the day's most watched in Tweens 9-14 and Kids 6-11 and the most watched for cable television in total viewers.

Matt Blum of Wired wrote about the episode, "if it's any indication, the second season will be even more brilliant than the first season was." Blum as well praised the appearance of Clancy Brown as a guest actor. One of the songs in the episode, "Little Brothers" was voted #4 on Phineas and Ferb's Musical Cliptastic Countdown.
