= Phineas and Ferb season 1 =

2007 American animated musical-comedy

Phineas and Ferb
- Season 1
- Showrunners: Dan Povenmire; Jeff "Swampy" Marsh
- No. of episodes: 26 (47 segments)

Release
- Original network: Disney Channel (2007-2008); Disney XD (2009)
- Original release: August 17, 2007 – February 18, 2009

Season chronology
- Next → Season 2

The first season of the American animated musical-comedy Phineas and Ferb premiered from August 17, 2007, to February 18, 2009. The twenty-six episode season was broadcast in the United States on the Disney Channel. The five main characters include stepbrothers Phineas Flynn and Ferb Fletcher, their neurotic older sister Candace Flynn, secret agent Perry the Platypus (who is also Phineas and Ferb's pet), and the "evil" scientist Dr. Heinz Doofenshmirtz.

Phineas and Ferb was created by Dan Povenmire and Jeff "Swampy" Marsh. The characters were conceived by the duo while working together on The Simpsons and Rocko's Modern Life in the 1990s, and were inspired by the summers of their own childhoods. Povenmire and Marsh spent 16 years attempting to get it pitched to Nickelodeon and Cartoon Network. They ultimately passed on the show, and Disney Television Animation signed on to produce the series.

Phineas and Ferb debuted on August 17, 2007. It was originally broadcast as a one-episode preview. Following the premiere of High School Musical 2, it was previewed again on September 28, 2007, before making its premiere in February 2008. The series was a success, with the premiere episode, "Rollercoaster", attracting over 10 million viewers during its first airing. The season had high viewership among viewers aged 6-10 and 9-14. By May 2008, the series had become a top-rated program amongst young children.

== Episodes ==
| No. overall | No. in season | Title | Directed by | Written by | Storyboarded by | Original release date | Prod. code | U.S. viewers (millions) |
|---|---|---|---|---|---|---|---|---|
| 1 | 1 | "Rollercoaster" | Dan Povenmire | Dan Povenmire & Jeff "Swampy" Marsh | Dan Povenmire (uncredited) | August 17, 2007 | 101 | 10.80 |
| 1 | 1 | "Candace Loses Her Head" | Dan Povenmire | Story by : Dan Povenmire, Jeff "Swampy" Marsh & Martin Olson; Teleplay by : Dan Povenmire, Jeff "Swampy" Marsh, Martin Olson, Kyle Baker & Patrick A. Ventura | Kyle Baker & Patrick A. Ventura | February 5, 2008 | 101 | N/A |
Phineas and Ferb construct a rollercoaster, inspired to create a better one after being unsatisfied with a past one they rode at the county fair. Meanwhile, Perry stops Doofenshmirtz from reversing the Earth's rotation with a large ball of tin foil. Phineas and Ferb carve Candace's face into Mount Rushmore as a birthday present. Meanwhile, Perry must thwart Doofenshmirtz from boring a tunnel to China from inside Mount Rushmore.
| 2 | 2 | "The Fast and the Phineas" | Dan Povenmire | Story by : Dan Povenmire & Jeff "Swampy" Marsh; Teleplay by : Dan Povenmire, Jeff "Swampy" Marsh, Sherm Cohen & Antoine Guilbaud | Sherm Cohen & Antoine Guilbaud | February 2, 2008 | 102 | N/A |
| 2 | 2 | "Lawn Gnome Beach Party of Terror" | Dan Povenmire | Story by : Dan Povenmire, Jeff "Swampy" Marsh, Martin Olson & Bobby Gaylor; Teleplay by : Dan Povenmire, Jeff "Swampy" Marsh, Martin Olson, Bobby Gaylor, Chris Headrick & Jon Colton Barry | Chris Headrick & Jon Colton Barry | September 28, 2007 | 102 | 3.3 |
Phineas and Ferb convert their mother's station wagon into a remote-controlled race car and enter it into a local stock-car race. Meanwhile, Doofenshmirtz attempts to use his latest invention—the "Deflate-inator"—to deflate everything in the Tri-State Area. Phineas and Ferb build a tropical beach in their backyard to survive the intense heat wave that has struck Danville. Meanwhile, Perry must stop Doofenshmirtz from stealing all the lawn gnomes in the Tri-State Area.
| 3 | 3 | "The Magnificent Few" | Dan Povenmire | Story by : Martin Olson, Dan Povenmire & Swampy Marsh; Teleplay by : Martin Olson, Dan Povenmire, Swampy Marsh, Mike Diederich & Chong Lee | Mike Diederich & Chong Lee | February 8, 2008 | 103 | 1.61 (Note: with kids 6-11) |
| 3 | 3 | "S'Winter" | Dan Povenmire | Story by : Dan Povenmire, Swampy Marsh, Martin Olson & Bobby Gaylor; Written by : Dan Povenmire, Swampy Marsh, Martin Olson, Bobby Gaylor, Sherm Cohen & Antoine Guilbaud | Antoine Guilbaud & Sherm Cohen | February 9, 2008 | 103 | N/A |
When Doofenshmirtz uses mind-controlled termites to destroy all the wood in the area to help his new aluminum-siding business, Phineas, Ferb, and Isabella must wrangle a herd of cattle that escaped from a dude ranch after the termites destroyed their barn. Phineas and Ferb use a snow-cone machine to create "S'Winter," an amalgam of summer and winter. Meanwhile, Candace follows her crush Jeremy after noticing him hanging out with a Swedish exchange student named D.D., and Doofenshmirtz plots to melt all the chocolate in the Tri-State Area with his "Melt-inator 65000".
| 4 | 4 | "Are You My Mummy?" | Dan Povenmire | Story by : Dan Povenmire, Swampy Marsh, Martin Olson & Bobby Gaylor; Written by : Dan Povenmire, Swampy Marsh, Martin Olson, Bobby Gaylor, Robert F. Hughes, Kyle Baker & Mike Roth | Kyle Baker & Mike Roth | February 15, 2008 | 104 | N/A |
| 4 | 4 | "Flop Starz" | Dan Povenmire | Story by : Dan Povenmire & Jeff "Swampy" Marsh; Teleplay by : Dan Povenmire, Jeff "Swampy" Marsh, Sherm Cohen & Antoine Guilbaud | Sherm Cohen & Antoine Guilbaud | February 1, 2008 | 104 | 3.99 |
Phineas and Ferb visit an Egyptian-themed movie theater and attempt to get a mummy of their own, but they end up capturing Candace, who is wrapped in toilet paper. Meanwhile, Doofenshmirtz tries to raise the city's water level by destroying a beaver dam so his real estate will become beachfront property. Phineas and Ferb's song "Gitchee, Gitchee, Goo" becomes a one-hit wonder and brings them worldwide fame, while Candace wins a chance to sing on stage with them during the auditions for a reality music competition. Meanwhile, Doofenshmirtz turns his building into a giant robot to wreak terror upon the Tri-State Area.
| 5 | 5 | "Raging Bully" | Dan Povenmire | Story by : Martin Olson, Dan Povenmire & Jeff "Swampy" Marsh; Teleplay by : Martin Olson, Dan Povenmire, Jeff "Swampy" Marsh, Wendy Grieb & Kent Osborne | Wendy Grieb & Kent Osborne | February 4, 2008 | 105 | 1.46 |
| 5 | 5 | "Lights, Candace, Action!" | Dan Povenmire | Story by : Dan Povenmire, Jeff "Swampy" Marsh, Martin Olson & Bobby Gaylor; Written by : Dan Povenmire, Jeff "Swampy" Marsh, Martin Olson, Bobby Gaylor, Sherm Cohen & Antoine Guilbaud | Sherm Cohen & Antoine Guilbaud | February 3, 2008 | 105 | N/A |
When Buford challenges Phineas to a thumb-wrestling competition, Phineas receives training from the boxing champion Evander Holyfield. Meanwhile, Doofenshmirtz creates a hypnotic device to control people's minds so they will be forced to celebrate his birthday and clean up afterward. Candace stars in the movie The Princess Sensibilities. However, she discovers that new directors Phineas and Ferb have changed it to The Curse of the Princess Monster. Meanwhile, Doofenshmirtz creates an "Age-Accelerator-inator" to age cheese but tries to age Perry.
| 6 | 6 | "Get That Bigfoot Outa My Face!" | Dan Povenmire | Story by : Dan Povenmire & Bobby Gaylor; Written by : Dan Povenmire, Bobby Gaylor, Kent Osborne & Kim Roberson | Kent Osborne & Kim Roberson | February 23, 2008 | 106 | N/A |
| 6 | 6 | "Tree to Get Ready" | Dan Povenmire | Story by : Martin Olson, Dan Povenmire & Swampy Marsh; Written by : Mike Diederich, Chong Lee, Martin Olson, Dan Povenmire & Swampy Marsh | Mike Diederich & Chong Lee | March 22, 2008 | 106 | N/A |
Phineas and Ferb visit their grandparents at a lake house, and they try to scare their friends with a fake Bigfoot, but then Candace and her grandparents scare them with a more lifelike Bigfoot. Meanwhile, Perry is trapped in Doofenshmirtz's love triangle as he enters while on a date. Phineas and Ferb build treehouses for themselves and Candace, while Doofenshmirtz plans to use brainwashed pigeons to destroy a celebration in honor of his brother Roger.
| 7 | 7 | "It's About Time!" (Note: This episode is a half-hour special.) | Dan Povenmire | Story by : Dan Povenmire; Written by : Dan Povenmire, Jon Colton Barry, Kent Osborne, Mike Roth & Aliki Theofilopoulos | Jon Colton Barry, Mike Roth, Kent Osborne & Aliki Theofilopoulos | March 1, 2008 | 107 | N/A |
Phineas and Ferb decide to repair a time machine at a natural history museum, sending themselves and Candace to the Jurassic Age. Meanwhile, Doofenshmirtz replaces Perry as his nemesis with a secret agent panda, causing Perry to become depressed.
| 8 | 8 | "Jerk De Soleil" | Dan Povenmire | Story by : Bobby Gaylor & Martin Olson; Written by : Bobby Gaylor, Martin Olson, J.G. Quintel & Kim Roberson | J.G. Quintel & Kim Roberson | February 10, 2008 | 108 | N/A |
| 8 | 8 | "Toy to the World" | Jeff "Swampy" Marsh | Story by : Bobby Gaylor & Martin Olson; Written by : Mike Diederich, Bobby Gaylor, Chong Lee & Martin Olson | Mike Diederich & Chong Lee | February 22, 2008 | 108 | 1.63 |
Phineas and Ferb create a circus for the neighborhood after their original circus plans are canceled, while Jeremy gives Candace wild parsnips without knowing that she is allergic to them. Meanwhile, Doofenshmirtz creates a device to make people's voices higher so his voice will seem lower, but instead, it gets even higher. After Candace sarcastically suggests they can make a better toy than the Har D Har Toy Company's "Shimmy Jimmy", Phineas and Ferb design an "inaction figure" based on Perry. Meanwhile, Doofenshmirtz plots to build toll booths to enter and exit the Tri-State Area to become rich.
| 9 | 9 | "One Good Scare Ought to Do It!" | Dan Povenmire & Zac Moncrief | Story by : Bobby Gaylor & Martin Olson; Written by : Jon Colton Barry, Bobby Gaylor, Chris Headrick & Martin Olson | Jon Colton Barry & Chris Headrick | October 3, 2008 (Note: This episode was first released on The Fast and the Phineas DVD on July 29, 2008.) | 109 | N/A |
Isabella has the hiccups, and Phineas and Ferb build a haunted house to scare them away. Candace goes over to Jeremy's house but is tormented by his little sister, Suzy, while Doofenshmirtz destroys his mentor's base per his request.
| 10 | 10 | "A Hard Day's Knight" | Dan Povenmire | sBobby Gaylor & Martin Olson; Written by : Jon Colton Barry, Bobby Gaylor, Martin Olson & Mike Roth | Jon Colton Barry & Mike Roth | June 14, 2008 | 110 | N/A |
| 10 | 10 | "I, Brobot" | Dan Povenmire | Story by : Martin Olson; Teleplay by : Martin Olson, Kent Osborne & Aliki Theofilopoulos | Kent Osborne & Aliki Theofilopoulos | February 6, 2008 | 110 | N/A |
Phineas, Ferb, and Candace visit their grandparents in England, and the boys create a Renaissance fair, where Candace ends up in a jousting tournament. Meanwhile, Perry goes undercover at an evil scientists' convention to track down Doofenshmirtz. Phineas and Ferb clone themselves as Phinedroids and Ferbots (robots) to complete more projects. Meanwhile, Doofenshmirtz tries using a giant magnet to erase messages he left on his girlfriend's answering machine.
| 11 | 11 | "Mom's Birthday" | Dan Povenmire | Story by : Swampy Marsh, Martin Olson & Dan Povenmire; Written by : Robert F. Hughes, Zac Moncrief, Martin Olson, Kent Osborne & Aliki Theofilopoulos | Kent Osborne & Aliki Theofilopoulos | February 29, 2008 | 111 | 3.4 |
| 11 | 11 | "Journey to the Center of Candace" | Dan Povenmire | Story by : Bobby Gaylor & Martin Olson; Written by : Bobby Gaylor, Robert F. Hughes, Zac Moncrief, Martin Olson, Kent Osborne & Kim Roberson | Kim Roberson & Kent Osborne | February 29, 2008 | 111 | 3.4 |
Candace plans a special birthday party for her mother, but Phineas and Ferb's plans keep upstaging her own. Meanwhile, Doofenshmirtz creates a shrinking machine that will make whatever he hates shrink to the size of an atom. Phineas and Ferb build a shrinking submarine to go inside Isabella's pet chihuahua and retrieve a sash it ate, but they accidentally end up in Candace's stomach instead while she is on a date with Jeremy. Meanwhile, Perry tries to stop Doofenshmirtz's plans to destroy anyone who cannot make up their mind with his newest invention, realizing that it may put Phineas and Ferb in danger.
| 12 | 12 | "Run Away Runway" | Dan Povenmire | Story by : Bobby Gaylor & Martin Olson; Teleplay by : Sherm Cohen, Bobby Gaylor, Antoine Guilbaud & Martin Olson | Sherm Cohen & Antoine Guilbaud | February 7, 2008 | 112 | 1.53 |
| 12 | 12 | "I Scream, You Scream" | Zac Moncrief | Story by : Bobby Gaylor; Written by : Sherm Cohen, Bobby Gaylor & Antoine Guilbaud | Sherm Cohen & Antoine Guilbaud | February 17, 2008 | 112 | N/A |
Candace tries to become a fashion model, while Phineas and Ferb create a fashion collection entitled Summer All the Time. Meanwhile, Doofenshmirtz designs a machine to create clones of himself so they can wait in line for him. Phineas and Ferb try to make a giant ice cream maker for Isabella after her tonsils are removed, and Doofenshmirtz tries to build a huge space laser while his daughter Vanessa stays with him for the weekend. As usual, Candace tries to bust Phineas and Ferb, while Vanessa tries to convince her mother that her father is evil.
| 13 | 13 | "It's a Mud, Mud, Mud, Mud World" | Zac Moncrief | Story by : Bobby Gaylor & Martin Olson; Written by : Mike Diederich, Bobby Gaylor, Robert F. Hughes, Zac Moncrief, Martin Olson & Mike Roth | Mike Diederich & Mike Roth | February 24, 2008 | 113 | N/A |
| 13 | 13 | "The Ballad of Badbeard" | Dan Povenmire | Story by : Bobby Gaylor & Martin Olson; Written by : Jon Colton Barry, Mike Diederich, Bobby Gaylor, Robert F. Hughes, Zac Moncrief & Martin Olson | Mike Diederich & Jon Colton Barry | April 12, 2008 | 113 | N/A |
Phineas and Ferb invent a monster truck for Candace to practice her driving skills, but soon, her practice run turns into a massive racing rally. Meanwhile, Doofenshmirtz tries to discover investors for his new line of monster trucks that look like monsters. Guest star: Billy Ray Cyrus as Buck Buckerson After learning about a mysterious pirate named Badbeard from their grandfather, Phineas and Ferb set out on a high-seas adventure. Meanwhile, Candace accidentally witnesses one of Perry and Doofenshmirtz's battles after getting infected with a psychedelic moss.
| 14 | 14 | "Dude, We're Getting the Band Back Together" | Dan Povenmire | Story by : Bobby Gaylor & Martin Olson; Written by : Bobby Gaylor, Chris Headrick, Robert F. Hughes, Chong Lee, Zac Moncrief & Martin Olson | Chris Headrick & Chong Lee | March 8, 2008 | 114 | N/A |
Phineas and Ferb locate their parents' favorite band, Love Händel, to perform a reunion concert in the backyard to make up for their father's wedding anniversary. Meanwhile, Doofenshmirtz plans a surprise birthday party for Vanessa and intends to launch Perry on a giant firecracker as the grand finale. Guest stars: Jaret Reddick, Carlos Alazraqui and Steve Zahn as the Love Handle Members
| 15 | 15 | "Ready for the Bettys" | Zac Moncrief | Story by : Bobby Gaylor & Martin Olson; Written by : Bobby Gaylor, Martin Olson, Kent Osborne & Aliki Theofilopoulos | Aliki Theofilopoulos & Kent Osborne | February 16, 2008 | 115 | N/A |
| 15 | 15 | "The Flying Fishmonger" | Zac Moncrief | Story by : Bobby Gaylor & Martin Olson; Written by : Bobby Gaylor, Elizabeth Ito, Martin Olson, Kim Roberson | Kim Roberson & Elizabeth Ito | September 12, 2008 | 115 | N/A |
Candace and her best friend Stacy travel on a tour bus with their favorite rock band, The Bettys, but later realize they are only being used as servants. Meanwhile, Phineas and Ferb accidentally discover Perry's lair and are sent on a mission intended for him. Phineas and Ferb help Ferb's grandfather live his lifelong dream—to jump a gorge in his motorcycle, the Holy Mackerel. Meanwhile, Doofenshmirtz tries to kick sand all over a childhood bully's house.
| 16 | 16 | "Phineas and Ferb Get Busted!" | Dan Povenmire | Story by : Bobby Gaylor & Martin Olson; Written by : Jon Colton Barry, Bobby Gaylor, Robert F. Hughes, Zac Moncrief, Martin Olson & Piero Piluso | Jon Colton Barry & Piero Piluso | February 16, 2009 (Note: Beginning with this episode, new episodes premiered on Disney XD prior to Disney Channel.) | 116 | N/A |
Candace finally busts Phineas and Ferb, resulting in them being sent to an aggressive reform school for their own good and safety that will stifle and destroy imagination and creativity by the mean and cruel drill sergeant. When Candace discovers what is being done to her brothers and realizes she misses them, she teams up with Jeremy to help rescue them. However, this adventure turns out to be a dream of Candace's in a dream of Perry’s.
| 17 | 17 | "Greece Lightning" | Dan Povenmire | Story by : Bobby Gaylor & Martin Olson; Written by : Alex Almaguer, Bobby Gaylor, Chris Headrick & Martin Olson | Alex Almaguer & Chris Headrick | April 19, 2008 | 117 | N/A |
| 17 | 17 | "Leave the Busting to Us!" | Zac Moncrief | Story by : Bobby Gaylor & Martin Olson; Written by : Sherm Cohen, Bobby Gaylor, Antoine Guilbaud, Robert F. Hughes & Martin Olson | Sherm Cohen & Antoine Guilbaud | April 19, 2008 | 117 | N/A |
After learning about ancient Greece, Phineas and Ferb stage a chariot race through Danville's streets. Meanwhile, after learning that the natural enemy of the platypus is man, Doofenshmirtz creates a mild-mannered robot named Norm to fight Perry. Candace uses a reality show, Bust 'Em, to secretly film her brothers designing a white-water rafting ride. Meanwhile, Doofenshmirtz tries to create a new ice age via weather pellets.
| 18 | 18 | "Crack That Whip" | Dan Povenmire | Story by : Bobby Gaylor & Martin Olson; Written by : Timothy Björklund & Kim Roberson | Timothy Björklund & Kim Roberson | May 24, 2008 | 118 | N/A |
| 18 | 18 | "The Best Lazy Day Ever" | Zac Moncrief | Story by : Bobby Gaylor & Martin Olson; Written by : Jon Colton Barry & Mike Roth | Jon Colton Barry & Mike Roth | May 24, 2008 | 118 | N/A |
Phineas and Ferb build a roller derby rink for their grandmother, who once was on a championship derby team, so that she can skate against her one-time rival, Jeremy's grandmother. Candace is worried that Jeremy will stop liking her if his grandmother loses. Meanwhile, Doofenshmirtz believes a statue of a bearded Rutherford B. Hayes is mocking him for being unable to grow facial hair. Phineas and Ferb decide to spend the day doing nothing, but Candace does not believe them and ends up constructing something of her own to try to bust them. Meanwhile, after being considered one of the ugliest people in the region, Doofenshmirtz plans to use an "Ugly-inator" to make everyone uglier than he is to make himself the most handsome person in the area.
| 19 | 19 | "Boyfriend from 27,000 B.C." | Zac Moncrief | Story by : Martin Olson; Written by : Aliki Theofilopoulos & Marc Crisafulli | Aliki Theofilopoulos & Marc Crisafulli | June 7, 2008 | 119 | N/A |
| 19 | 19 | "Voyage to the Bottom of Buford" | Zac Moncrief | Story by : Bobby Gaylor & Martin Olson; Written by : Antoine Guilbaud & Chong Lee | Antoine Guilbaud & Chong Lee | June 7, 2008 | 119 | N/A |
Phineas and Ferb revive a caveman from a glacier, but the caveman gets loose into a costume party Candace is attending, and she mistakes him for Jeremy. Meanwhile, Doofenshmirtz plans to destroy sandwich costumes. When Buford's goldfish, Biff, goes missing, Phineas and Ferb help him find it. Meanwhile, Doofenshmirtz tries to regain his evil reputation after accidentally saving a kitten who fell from a tree.
| 20 | 20 | "Put That Putter Away" | Zac Moncrief | order-s,w Written by : Jon Colton Barry & Mike Diederich; Story by : Bobby Gaylor & Martin Olson | Jon Colton Barry & Mike Diederich | August 10, 2008 | 120 | 1.53 |
| 20 | 20 | "Does This Duckbill Make Me Look Fat?" | Dan Povenmire | Story by : Bobby Gaylor & Martin Olson; Written by : Douglas McCarthy & Piero Piluso | Douglas McCarthy & Piero Piluso | August 10, 2008 | 120 | 1.53 |
Phineas and Ferb build a giant miniature golf course when Danville's only miniature golf course goes out of business. Candace is sick with a cold and enlists Stacy decides to bust the boys, but Stacy fails to focus and plays miniature golf with the boys. Meanwhile, Doofenshmirtz moves into a house on the same street as the Flynn-Fletcher house. After watching an old sci-fi film, Phineas and Ferb decide to build a molecular transporter, which ends up switching the minds of Perry and Candace into each other's bodies after they accidentally go in together. Candace is forced to spend most of the day as a platypus, while Perry, in Candace's body, goes on a mission to foil Doofenshmirtz's newest scheme: to replace the Mr. Slushy Burger jingle in the statues of mascot "Slushy the Clown" with his evil jingles. Guest star: Rob Paulsen as the mad scientist
| 21 | 21 | "Traffic Cam Caper" | Dan Povenmire & Zac Moncrief | Story by : Martin Olson; Written by : Kim Roberson & Marc Ceccarelli | Kim Roberson & Marc Ceccarelli | July 12, 2008 | 121 | N/A |
| 21 | 21 | "Bowl-R-Ama Drama" | Dan Povenmire | Story by : Bobby Gaylor & Martin Olson; Written by : Chris Headrick & Alex Almaguer | Chris Headrick & Alex Almaguer | July 12, 2008 | 121 | N/A |
Candace acquires footage from a traffic camera showing proof of Phineas and Ferb's antics. However, Perry, using Doofenshmirtz's robot Norm, steals it for himself so it can be destroyed since it contains evidence he is a secret agent. Phineas and Ferb build the world's largest bowling ball and pins to try to beat the world record and get into The World's Most Pointless Records. Candace test-drives the bowling ball, which she plans to show to Jeremy; when she accidentally turns off an internal gyroscope, she loses control and rolls around through downtown Danville. Meanwhile, Doofenshmirtz tries to use giant robotic penguins to freeze Danville so he can sell addictive hot chocolate for a million dollars a cup.
| 22 | 22 | "The Monster of Phineas-n-Ferbenstein" | Zac Moncrief | Story by : Jon Colton Barry & Martin Olson; Written by : Jon Colton Barry & Mike Diederich | Jon Colton Barry & Mike Diederich | October 17, 2008 | 122 | 1.26 (Note: with kids 9-14) |
| 22 | 22 | "Oil on Candace" | Zac Moncrief | Story by : Bobby Gaylor & Martin Olson; Written by : Antoine Guilbaud & Aliki Theofilopoulos | Antoine Guilbaud & Aliki Theofilopoulos | October 17, 2008 | 122 | 1.26 |
Phineas and Ferb learn about one of Ferb's Victorian ancestors, Ferbgor and Dr. Phineastein, who once created a giant platypus monster for a "Monster Ball". Meanwhile, while locked in his lab, Doofenshmirtz tells Perry a loosely connected story about his ancestor, Dr. Jekyll Doofenshmirtz, and his failed attempts to make a potion that could turn himself into a monster. Phineas and Ferb help their friend Django display his artwork, while Doofenshmirtz tries to impress his former Evil Science professor.
| 23 | 23 | "Unfair Science Fair" | Dan Povenmire & Zac Moncrief | Story by : Bobby Gaylor & Martin Olson; Written by : Elizabeth Ito & Aliki Theofilopoulos | Elizabeth Ito & Aliki Theofilopoulos | February 17, 2009 (Note: This episode was first released on The Daze of Summer DVD on February 10, 2009.) | 123 | N/A |
| 23 | 23 | "Unfair Science Fair Redux (Another Story)" | Dan Povenmire & Zac Moncrief | Story by : Bobby Gaylor & Martin Olson; Written by : Jon Colton Barry & Piero Piluso | Jon Colton Barry & Piero Piluso | February 18, 2009 | 123 | N/A |
When Baljeet enters the science fair with a design for a portal to Mars, Phineas and Ferb help him build it to scale. Meanwhile, Doofenshmirtz tries to win first prize at the fair with a giant baking soda volcano, and Candace competes with a girl for a job at Mr. Slushy Dawg. Candace uses Baljeet's portal when her friends are too busy to hang out, and inadvertently becomes queen of Mars. Meanwhile, Perry helps Doofenshmirtz shop for supplies for his baking soda volcano.
| 24 | 24 | "Out to Launch" | Dan Povenmire & Zac Moncrief | Story by : Bobby Gaylor & Martin Olson; Written by : Kim Roberson, Piero Piluso & Kent Osborne | Kim Roberson, Piero Piluso & Kent Osborne | December 5, 2008 | 124 | N/A |
Lawrence buys a star for Phineas and Ferb online, leading them to build a rocket to visit it. Meanwhile, Doofenshmirtz uses a space station robot to perform a shadow puppet show on the Moon to get back at a former classmate, who himself was a poor puppeteer with huge hands, but still won over a girl who had been interested in Doofenshmirtz.
| 25 | 25 | "Got Game?" | Zac Moncrief | Story by : Jon Colton Barry, Bobby Gaylor, Lance LeCompte & Martin Olson; Written by : Antoine Guilbaud & Chong Lee | Antoine Guilbaud & Chong Lee | August 2, 2008 | 125 | N/A |
| 25 | 25 | "Comet Kermillian" | Dan Povenmire | Story by : Martin Olson & Bobby Gaylor; Written by : Alex Almaguer & Chris Headrick | Alex Almaguer & Chris Headrick | August 2, 2008 | 125 | N/A |
Phineas and Ferb create a sports competition that pits boys against girls to see who are the better athletes, as Isabella and Buford argue about who is better. Meanwhile, Doofenshmirtz tries to win a dog show. Phineas and Ferb build an observatory and plan to etch their faces in a comet. Candace is tormented by Jeremy's sister, Suzy, while on an outing with him. Meanwhile, Doofenshmirtz buys all the steaks in the city so he can mass-market glasses made from them and also creates a giant heat ray. Guest star: Phil LaMarr as the street performer
| 26 | 26 | "Out of Toon" | Zac Moncrief | Story by : Bobby Gaylor & Martin Olson; Written by : Jon Colton Barry & Mike Diederich | Jon Colton Barry & Mike Diederich | November 7, 2008 | 126 | N/A |
| 26 | 26 | "Hail Doofania!" | Zac Moncrief | Story by : Bobby Gaylor & Martin Olson; Written by : Antoine Guilbaud & Aliki Theofilopoulos | Antoine Guilbaud & Aliki Theofilopoulos | November 7, 2008 | 126 | N/A |
Phineas and Ferb create a superhero cartoon with exaggerated versions of themselves, their sister, and their friends, while Doofenshmirtz creates a ray gun that makes people dance. After finding out Roger has been elected mayor, Doofenshmirtz builds his own country on a giant inner tube, and Vanessa tries to bust him to her mother. Meanwhile, Phineas and Ferb create a "Rainbow-inator" to show Isabella her first rainbow, and Candace and Vanessa accidentally switch clothes at the dry cleaners.

== Production ==
=== Development ===
Series co-creator Dan Povenmire cited the origins for the show to his childhood in Mobile, Alabama. Povenmire recalled that his mother told him "never to waste a day of summer". Meanwhile, the show's other co-creator, Jeff "Swampy" Marsh grew up in a large, blended family. Similar to Povenmire, Marsh spent his summers exploring and taking part in several different activities in order to have fun. The two met while working as layout artists on The Simpsons in the 1990s. Povenmire commented that "We were always laughing at the same jokes". The two became a writing team on the Nickelodeon animated series Rocko's Modern Life. They began working on Phineas and Ferb around 1992, while still working together at Nickelodeon. The two had become friends due to their mutual tastes and interests. Citing their childhood, they wanted to incorporate summer vacations, a time when the two would go out and do something constructive. They spent fourteen years pitching it to four different networks, including Nickelodeon and Cartoon Network, all of which kept shooting it down due to its complexity.

Povenmire eventually landed the pitched with Disney. The network did not immediately accept the show but told Povenmire that it would keep the packet. Povenmire assumed that this had meant an end to negotiations, aware that the phrase usually means they "throw it in the trash later." To his complete surprise, however, Disney accepted it. After being given a chance, Povenmire and Marsh turned their attention to the company's overseas executives. Instead of penning a normal script, the two drew out storyboards and played them in a reel. Povenmire voiced over the reel with his dialogue and added sound effects. After securing the executives' support, production on the show began in the summer of 2006. The duo invited colleagues who also worked on Rocko's Modern Life to exert the same function.

=== Writing style ===
The show uses four major writers to devise story ideas according to "strict guidelines", such as that the boys' schemes never appear to be "magical". Stories are reviewed at weekly sessions on Monday, then simultaneously scripted and storyboarded. A very rough design is built before the storyboard, featuring little more than suggested scenes and dialogue, is drafted; the writers then gather for a "play-by-play" walk-through of the storyboard in front of the whole crew, whose reactions to the jokes are assessed before rewrites are made. The writers also include running gags in every episode, which are generally lines spoken by characters. Almost every episode is set into two eleven-minute segments.

=== Cast ===
Phineas and Ferb are voiced by Vincent Martella and Thomas Sangster, respectively. Sangster was one of many British actors cast; Marsh lived in the United Kingdom for seven years, and developed a fondness for its people. The rest of the cast includes Ashley Tisdale as their sister Candace, Dee Bradley Baker as the secret agent platypus Perry, Caroline Rhea as Phineas and Ferb's mother Linda Flynn-Fletcher, Richard O'Brien as Phineas and Ferb's father Lawrence Fletcher, Kelly Hu as Candace's best friend Stacy, and Alyson Stoner as Phineas and Ferb's next-door neighbor and best friend Isabella. Series creators Dan Povenmire and Jeff "Swampy" Marsh provide the voices of Dr. Doofenshmirtz and Major Monogram, respectively.

== Release ==
=== Announcements ===
The series was officially announced as part of the annual upfront presentation to advertisers on February 8, 2007, with a premiere date slated for winter of 2008. The main voice cast was revealed to include Vincent Martella and Thomas Sangster as the titular characters, and then-Disney Channel stars Ashley Tisdale and Mitchel Musso as Candace and Jeremy. Recurring actors and a number of guest stars for the season were unveiled on September 13, along with the premiere date, which was set to January 2008. Following the popularity of the first 2 previews, Disney Channel released a press release on November 8, stating that the series would officially premiere in February 2008, with new episodes being shown every night in a month-long marathon dubbed "Ferb-ruary." In that same interview, series creators Povenmire and Marsh were added to the cast in the roles of Dr. Doofenshmirtz and Major Monogram respectively.

== Ratings ==
The first episode, "Rollercoaster", garnered a total of 10.8 million viewers when aired as a one-episode preview on August 17, 2007. When Phineas and Ferb officially debuted in February the next year, it proved cable's number one watched animated series premiere by "tweens". Throughout the first quarter that followed, it peaked as the top-rated animated series for ages 6–10 and 9–14, also becoming number three animated series for all of cable television for viewers age 6–10. By the time the commissioning of the second season was announced in May 2008, the series had become a top-rated program in the 6–11 and 9–14 age groups. The review aggregator website Rotten Tomatoes calculated an approval rating of 100%, based on 7 reviews, with an average rating of 9/10.
