= Milo Murphy's Law =

American animated TV series (2016–2019)

- Genre: Comedy
- Created by: Dan Povenmire; Jeff "Swampy" Marsh
- Directed by: Dan Povenmire; Robert F. Hughes; Bob Bowen
- Voices of: "Weird Al" Yankovic; Sabrina Carpenter; Mekai Curtis
- Opening theme: "It's My World (And We're All Living in It)" by "Weird Al" Yankovic
- Ending theme: "It's My World (And We're All Living in It)"
- Composer: Danny Jacob
- Country of origin: United States
- Original language: English
- No. of seasons: 2
- No. of episodes: 40 (73 segments) (list of episodes)

Production
- Executive producers: Dan Povenmire; Jeff "Swampy" Marsh
- Producer: Robert F. Hughes
- Editor: Anne Harting
- Running time: 22 minutes (11 minutes per segment)
- Production company: Disney Television Animation

Original release
- Network: Disney XD
- Release: October 3, 2016 – December 2, 2017
- Network: Disney Channel
- Release: January 5 – May 18, 2019

Related
- Phineas and Ferb; Hamster & Gretel

Milo Murphy's Law is an American animated comedy television series created by Dan Povenmire and Jeff "Swampy" Marsh for Disney Channel and Disney XD. The series premiered on October 3, 2016, on Disney XD. It revolves around the title character, Milo Murphy, who is a descendant of the "Original Murphy" of Murphy's law, which states that anything that can go wrong will go wrong. The series takes place in the same universe as Povenmire and Marsh's previous series Phineas and Ferb, with multiple references to the show occurring across the first season, culminating in a crossover at the start of the second season and continuing throughout with other plot threads from the former series.

While working on Hamster & Gretel, Povenmire stated that he and Marsh "...would both really love to do more Milo Murphy...I'm willing to do more than one show at a time," and according to Povenmire, a possible third season hinged on its Disney+ viewership.

== Characters ==
=== Main ===
- "Weird Al" Yankovic as Milo Murphy, the title character of the series. He has a reputation for having extreme misfortune due to being a descendant of the creator of Murphy's Law. Despite constant misfortune, he is optimistic and has a talent for overcoming his bad luck. He carries a backpack with him that seems to have what he needs for any given situation. It was given to him by his old babysitter, Veronica, who was the only one able to handle Murphy's Law.
- Sabrina Carpenter as Melissa Chase, the long-time best friend of Milo's. Her father is the local fire chief. She has had a secret fear of rollercoasters, since one nearly fell on her, and has fake front teeth after catching a pop fly.
- Mekai Curtis as Zack Underwood, Milo's best friend. He was once the lead singer of a boy band called "The Lumberzacks".

=== Supporting ===
==== The Murphys' house ====
- Diedrich Bader as Martin Murphy, Milo's father. Just like his son, he has extreme misfortune. He is a safety inspector, mostly due to the fact that when he's around, safety contingencies are pushed to the limit.
- Pamela Adlon as Brigette Murphy, Milo's mother who is an architect.
- Kate Micucci as Sara Murphy, Milo's older sister and fellow Dr. Zone fan.
- Dee Bradley Baker as Diogee Ex Machina Murphy, Milo's dog. He regularly follows Milo, who keeps telling him to go home. His name is pronounced "d-o-g", and his middle name refers to the fact that he often appears out of nowhere, to help Milo out of seemingly hopeless situations. In general, his whole name is a play off of the phrase "deus ex machina" (with "god" as the translation of "deus").
- Dan Povenmire as Dr. Heinz Doofenshmirtz (a.k.a. "Professor Time"), a formerly-evil-scientist-turned-O.W.C.A. member. Doofenshmirtz becomes a supporting character in the second season, living in the Murphys' garden shed after his house is destroyed by Murphy's Law.

==== Jefferson County Middle School ====
- Chrissie Fit as Amanda Lopez, a student in Milo's class who is a perfectionist and serves as the love interest for Milo throughout the series.
- Vincent Martella as Bradley Nicholson, a pessimistic and arrogant student who is jealous of the attention Milo gets.
- Greg Cipes as Mort Schaeffer, a friend of Milo and Bradley's and the drummer in their band.
- Django Marsh as Chad Van Coff, a classmate of Milo's who is convinced that Mr. Drako is a vampire.
- Alyson Stoner as Lydia, a classmate of Milo's as well as Amanda's best friend.
- Michael Culross as Kyle Drako, a middle school teacher with a slight Hungarian accent based upon that of 1930's Dracula actor Bela Lugosi. A recurring gag involves him exhibiting the traits of a vampire.
- Christian Slater as Elliot Decker, the school crossing guard and self-described "Safety Czar" who makes it his mission to protect the city from Milo.
- Mackenzie Phillips as Elizabeth Milder, the principal of Jefferson County Middle School.
- Kevin Michael Richardson as Nolan Mitchell, the football coach of Jefferson County Middle School.
- Sarah Chalke as Mrs. Murawski, the science teacher of Jefferson County Middle School who holds an unhealthy affection for her desk.
- Laraine Newman as Ms. White, another middle school teacher.

==== Bureau of Time Travel Agents ====
- Dan Povenmire and Jeff "Swampy" Marsh as Vinnie Dakota and Balthazar Cavendish. The pair are time travelers given the assignment to prevent the extinction of the pistachio. They are considered a joke by their fellow time agents because their job is considered inconsequential. Dakota dresses in 1970s disco clothing while Cavendish dresses in 1870s victorian era formal wear. In the episode "Missing Milo", they are revealed to be the inspiration for Dr. Zone and Time Ape.
- Mark Hamill as Mr. Block, Cavendish and Dakota's superior.
  - Hamill also voices Bob Block, Mr. Block's great-great-great-grandfather in the present day, who hires Cavendish and Dakota as janitors for P.I.G.
- Ming-Na Wen and Brett Dalton as time agents Savannah and Brick. Unlike Dakota and Cavendish, the pair resemble traditional secret agents and drive a time vehicle that resembles a limousine. Their character designs are based on their voice actors, who portrayed secret agents in the television series Agents of S.H.I.E.L.D.

==== O.W.C.A. (Organization Without a Cool Acronym) ====
- Dee Bradley Baker as Perry the Platypus, aka "Agent P", a platypus agent and the pet of the Flynn-Fletcher family.
- Jeff "Swampy" Marsh as Major Monogram, Perry's superior in O.W.C.A.
- Tyler Alexander Mann as Carl, Major Monogram's personal assistant.

==== Octalians ====
- Joanna Hausmann as Alien Commander, the captain of an extraterrestrial fleet interested in the capture of Milo.
- Odessa Adlon as Orgaluth, the Alien Commander's daughter.
- Brock Powell as Alien Pilot, the Alien Commander's second-in-command.
- John Ross Bowie and Cedric Yarbrough as Loab and Khone, the Alien Commander's "favorite" field agents.
- Al Yankovic, Jeff "Swampy" Marsh, and Brock Powell as Beek, Mantel and Dorsal, additional field agents under the Alien Commander.

=== Others ===
- Vanessa Williams as Eileen Underwood, Zack's mother who works as a surgeon.
- Phil LaMarr as Marcus Underwood, Zack's father.
- Adrian Pasdar as Richard Chase, Melissa's father who works as a fireman.
- Jemaine Clement as Doctor Zone, the main character of the eponymous show within a show, inspired by the eponymous character from Doctor Who.
  - Clement also voices Orton Mahlson, the creator and star of Doctor Zone, whom Milo and his friends team up with to stop the Pistachions. His name is a parody of series writer Martin Olson.
- Sophie Winkleman as Time Ape, Dr. Zone's sidekick.
- Rhys Darby as King Pistachion, a mutated pistachio that takes over Cavendish and Dakota's future with his army of Pistachions.
- Scott D. Peterson as Scott, an "Undergrounder" who lives beneath Danville.
- Vincent Martella as Phineas Flynn, an upbeat young boy whom Milo and his friends team up with to stop the Pistachions.
- David Errigo Jr. as Ferb Fletcher, a boy of few words whom Milo and his friends team up with to stop the Pistachions.
- Ashley Tisdale as Candace Flynn, Phineas' sister whom Milo and his friends team up with to stop the Pistachions.
- Maulik Pancholy as Baljeet Tjinder, a friend of Phineas and Ferb's whom Milo and his friends team up with to stop the Pistachions.
- Bobby Gaylor as Buford van Stomm, a friend of Phineas and Ferb's whom Milo and his friends team up with to stop the Pistachions.
- Alyson Stoner as Isabella Garcia-Shapiro, a friend of Phineas and Ferb's whom Milo and his friends team up with to stop the Pistachions.
- Dan Povenmire as Colonel Niblet, head of a mysterious government agency.
- Jeff "Swampy" Marsh as Lieutenant Tennant, a government lieutenant under Colonel Niblet.
- John Viener as the disembodied head of Norm, Doof's formerly giant robot man.
- Olivia Olson as Vanessa Doofenshmirtz, Doof's goth daughter from his failed marriage.
- Mitchel Musso as Jeremy Johnson, Candace Flynn's boyfriend.
- Maulik Pancholy as "Neal from the Comic Shop", Sara's love interest.

== Episodes ==
The show currently comprises two seasons with 20 episodes each. When asked about the odds of a third season in May 2020, Povenmire stated they are still at a low and the odds all hinge on the uptick in views on Disney+ which had yet to happen.

Season	Segments	Episodes	Originally released		
Season	Segments	Episodes	First released	Last released	Network
1	36	20	October 3, 2016	December 2, 2017	Disney XD
2	37	20	January 5, 2019	May 18, 2019	Disney Channel

== Crossovers ==
The second-season premiere episode was a crossover with the series creators' previous show, Phineas and Ferb. The entire Phineas and Ferb cast reprised their roles for the special, with the exception of Thomas Sangster, the original voice of Ferb, due to scheduling conflicts. Ferb was instead voiced by David Errigo Jr. Following the crossover, the Phineas and Ferb characters Doofenshmirtz, Perry the Platypus, Major Monogram and Carl joined the cast of Milo Murphy's Law in a recurring capacity, following the destruction of Doofenshmirtz's penthouse building.

Milo Murphy's Law character Trucker Ted appeared in the Disney+ film Phineas and Ferb the Movie: Candace Against the Universe, with Bob Bowen reprising his role. "Weird Al" Yankovic was also slated to return as Milo Murphy in the film, but his scenes were cut from the final release.

In August 2022, Povenmire expressed interest in a crossover between Hamster & Gretel, Phineas and Ferb, and Milo Murphy’s Law.

== Reception ==
Common Sense Media rated the show 4 out of 5 stars, stating: "Parents need to know that Milo Murphy's Law is a hilarious animated series from the creators of Phineas and Ferb. It suggests that the fabled Murphy's Law (whatever can go wrong will go wrong) is a real condition that afflicts its titular character and puts him through all sorts of unpredictable trials. As a result, there are lots of scary and potentially painful accidents (falling off a cliff, being chased by wolves, getting caught in a subway turnstile), but Milo always approaches them with a can-do attitude that positively influences his friends as well. As for his friends, they prove their worth by sticking with him regardless of what that exposes them to, so there are lots of good messages there".

Common Sense Media rated the crossover episode, titled "The Phineas and Ferb Effect", 4 out of 5 stars, stating, "Expect a lot of action involving oversized plantlike monsters who don human identities and turn some people into plants themselves, but no real violence. If this is your kids' introduction to any of these characters, know that this fun mix of personalities will encourage them to seek out more of their separate escapades".

Parrot Analytics reported in May 2021 that "the audience demand for Milo Murphy's Law is 4 times the demand of the average TV series...", and it was also ranked as No. 77 of the top 100 series on Disney+. On February 23, Marsh stated that although Disney had apologized to him and Povenmire for promoting the show poorly in the past, "... the show is doing well on Disney+, and that maybe its success will possibly justify a couple of specials".

=== Awards and nominations ===
Year	Award	Category	Nominee	Result
2017	44th Annie Awards	Outstanding Achievement, Storyboarding in an Animated TV/Broadcast Production	Dan Povenmire and Kyle Menke for "Going the Extra Milo"	Nominated
2017	44th Daytime Emmy Awards	Outstanding Children's Animated Program	Dan Povenmire (executive producer), Jeff "Swampy" Marsh (co-executive producer)	Nominated
2017	44th Daytime Emmy Awards	Outstanding Writing in an Animated Program	Jeff "Swampy" Marsh, Kyle Menke, Dan Povenmire	Nominated
2018	45th Annie Awards	Outstanding Achievement for Writing in an Animated Television/Broadcast Production	Joshua Pruett for "The Island of the Lost Dakotas"	Nominated
2020	47th Daytime Emmy Awards	Outstanding Special Class Animated Program	Milo Murphy's Law	Nominated
