= Flop Starz =

- Phineas and Ferb segment
- Candace joins Phineas and Ferb's band to perform "Gitchee Gitchee Goo."
- Episode no.: Season 1 Episode 4b
- Directed by: Dan Povenmire
- Story by: Dan Povenmire; Jeff "Swampy" Marsh
- Production code: 104b
- Original air date: February 1, 2008

Episode chronology
← Previous "Are You My Mummy?"	Next → "Raging Bully"
- Phineas and Ferb season 1

"Flop Starz" is the second half of the fourth episode, as well as the third broadcast episode of the American animated television series Phineas and Ferb. (Note: Two episodes ("Rollercoaster" and "Lawn Gnome Beach Party of Terror") aired before the episode as previews, making it the third to be broadcast.) The episode was originally broadcast on Disney Channel on February 1, 2008 (as the official series premiere). In the episode, Phineas and Ferb become one-hit wonders in a morning, much to the disappointment of their sister Candace, who is trying out for the talent show The Next American Pop Teen Idol Star! Meanwhile, Doofenshmirtz converts his building into a giant robot to aid him in his attempt to conquer the Tri-State Area.

The episode was storyboarded by Sherm Cohen and Antoine Guilbaud with the story conceived by the co-creators of the series. The episode included "Gitchee Gitchee Goo", the first song included in the series; it was so popular with Disney executives that they asked for a song in every episode. The episode was broadcast to premiere the series, so a majority of the series' standard humor and plot devices had yet to be established.

"Flop Starz" carried several references to the music industry (the title is a spoof of the phrase "pop stars"), as well as to the talent show American Idol. The episode was well received by critics and fans alike, gaining 4.0 million viewers when it premiered. "Flop Starz" has been featured in several pieces of merchandise, including a junior novelization by Lara Bergen in 2009.

== Plot ==
External videos
- Flop Starz | S1 E4 | Full Episode | Phineas and Ferb | @disneyxd — Official upload of the episode onto YouTube

At breakfast, the family watches a promo for a teen talent competition show; Candace is inspired to audition at the mall. The boys are also curious, specifically about artists who only release one successful song, then it's all over. Their mother explains the concept of "one-hit wonders" to them and reminisces about her days as one named "Lindana". While the boys work on becoming one-hit wonders by writing a "meaningless" song, Candace tries on outfits for the audition - including her mother's Lindana outfit- all rejected by her best friend Stacy.

At the audition, she is set to perform with the new band "PFT", which she discovers is "Phineas and the Ferb-Tones" (PFT for short), consisting of Phineas (main vocals and guitarist), Ferb (drummer and keyboardist), and their friends, Isabella Garcia-Shapiro and Fireside Girls, Adyson Sweetwater, Gretchen and Milly (as back-up singers "the Ferbettes"), whose song "Gitchee Gitchee Goo" has topped the charts, making them one-hit wonders. Instead of joining them, Candace tries to expose them to their mother as usual. She mistakes the on-stage silhouette of an anthropomorphic rabbit playing a blender as his instrument for her brothers and her mother takes her to get glasses.

Meanwhile, Perry enters Dr. Doofenshmirtz's lair, which is in a different building to usual, wearing groucho glasses; confusing him for a temp, Doofenshmirtz explains his plan to terrorize the "entire Tri-State Area". After Perry removes his "disguise" the entire building transforms into a giant robot (thanks to Doofenshmirtz buying up huge numbers of construction toys).

Oblivious to Candace's threat, the boys go to "Huge-O-Records" to discuss a record deal. Meanwhile, trying to show their mom the band's poster on a building outside, Candace hurries their mother from a store whilst inadvertently carrying a jacket she has not paid for. The security guard recognizes the mother as Lindana, but insists she goes back inside to pay. During the delay, the poster is destroyed because it was on a building scheduled for demolition. (Ironically, her mother would have witnessed it being destroyed by Doofenshmirtz's robot if Perry had not changed its direction.) At the record company, Phineas, inspired by his mother's story, throws a diva tantrum and leaves, unaware that the CEO Ben Baxter plans to use a videotape of the band's performance to carry on its legacy.

Meanwhile, a seemingly victorious Doofenshmirtz traps Perry and offers him a deli platter. Perry allows him to pour a large amount of pepper onto it, which he blows, causing the robot building to sneeze. The pair are sent flying through the record office, taking the PFT tape with them. In the free fall following this, Perry uses the tape to hook himself safely on a flag pole, while Doofenshmirtz lands on a mattress on top of a parked truck belonging to a folding mattress company. He is immediately crushed, first by the mattress and then by his own robot.

Back at the mall, Candace, having failed to bust her brothers, is downtrodden until Jeremy tells her the boys' fun shouldn't ruin her good time and that she should sing anyway. She joins the band in singing their hit song in a reunion concert. Rethinking her view of her brothers, believing they may be her ticket to stardom, Candace is devastated when the band announces its retirement. Everyone else leaves the closing mall, leaving her in the dark by her lonesome.

== Voice cast ==
- Vincent Martella as Phineas Flynn, Additional Voices
- Ashley Tisdale as Candace Flynn, Additional Voices
- Thomas Sangster as Ferb Fletcher (credit only)
  - Danny Jacob as Ferb's singing voice (uncredited)
- Caroline Rhea as Linda Flynn-Fletcher, Additional Voices
- Alyson Stoner as Isabella Garcia-Shapiro
  - Laura Dickinson as Isabella and the Fireside Girls' singing voices (uncredited)
- Mitchel Musso as Jeremy Johnson, Additional Voices
- Dan Povenmire as Dr. Heinz Doofenshmirtz, Additional Voices
- Jeff "Swampy" Marsh as Major Monogram, Additional Voices
- Dee Bradley Baker as Perry the Platypus, Additional Voices
- Kelly Hu as Stacy Hirano, Additional Voices
- Jeff Bennett as Ben Baxter, Additional Voices

== Production ==
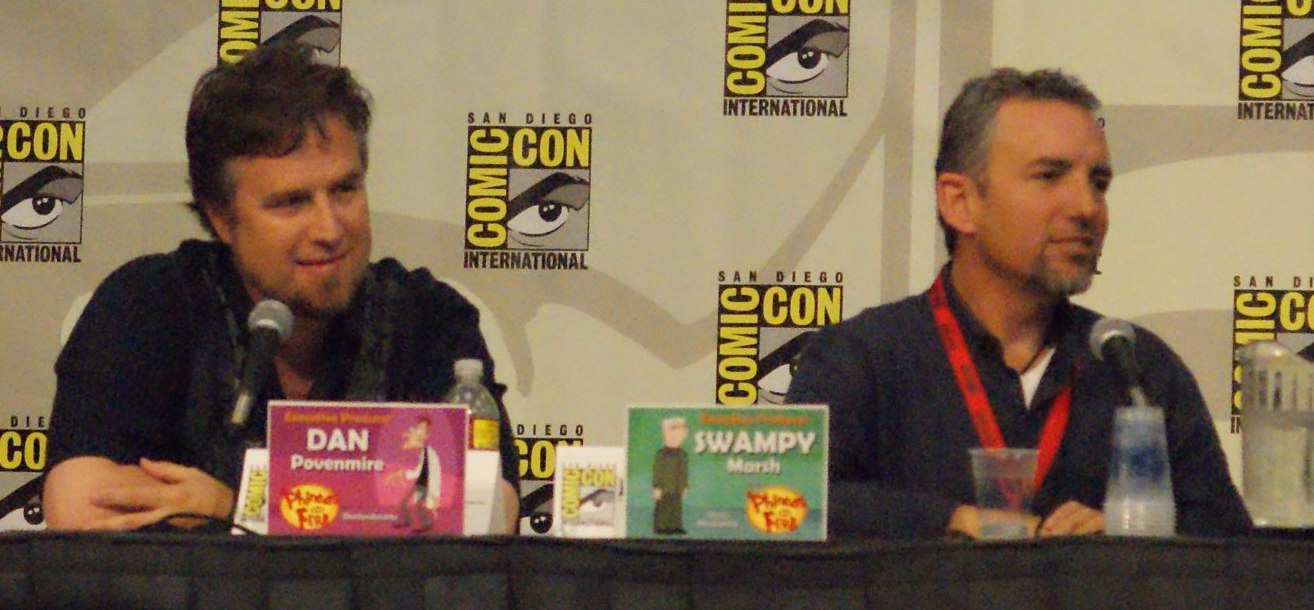
Series co-creators Dan Povenmire and Jeff "Swampy" Marsh wrote "Flop Starz."

Series co-creators, Dan Povenmire and Swampy Marsh, wrote the story for "Flop Starz;" Sherm Cohen and Antoine Guilbaud, meanwhile, constructed the storyboards. Povenmire directed the episode, which he did for the majority of the season. Povenmire and Marsh wrote the featured song, "Gitchee Gitchee Goo," like they do with all of the music in the show. That song and Perry's "secret agent theme" were the first pitched to Disney, who enjoyed it so much they wanted the pair to write a song for every episode.

Disney Channels Worldwide coordinated a global launch for the show; "Flop Starz" was chosen as the premiere episode across 150 territories where the Disney Channel was broadcast instead of the pilot episode, "Rollercoaster". This caused the episode to premiere six months later than originally planned due to the logistics of dubbing and localizing the episodes in the selected languages. Despite the delay, the episode officially aired on 1 February 2008, starting off the month-long marathon Disney titled "Phineas and Ferb-uary."

== Cultural references ==
The episode contains several references to the talent show American Idol, as the competition Candace enters and "Phineas and the Ferb-tones" perform at, The Next American Pop Teen Idol Star, is a complete parody of it. The episode as well references the craze of boy bands and the pop genre, more specifically the "bubblegum" style, including its title, a play on "pop stars".

Candace, trying on outfits, goes through a sailor suit, a construction worker uniform, Native American clothing, a biker wear, and a policemen uniform; these are referent to the clothing worn by five members of the 1970s disco group Village People.

Linda's pseudonym as a one-hit wonder, "Lindana," is a spoof of the famous singer Madonna; as well, the title of her hit single "I'm Lindana and I Wanna Have Fun" is referent to the 1983 hit song "Girls Just Want to Have Fun" by Cyndi Lauper. Furthermore, during the end credits, the greatest hits album for the song is titled "The Essential Lindana: Still Fun..." which is a play on the Essential line of compilations from Legacy Recordings.

In 2022, creator Dan Povenmire confirmed on his TikTok that "Gitchee Gitchee Goo" was inspired by the song "Eep, Opp, Ork, Ah-ah (Means I Love You)" from The Jetsons episode "A Date with Jet Screamer".

== Reception ==
=== Ratings ===
Logistically and technically, that represented quite an achievement when you consider the kind of effort that was involved in areas like dubbing, promotion and marketing.

— Jonathan Boseley, Disney Channel V.P. of programming for the U.K., Scandinavia and emerging markets, on the episode's ratings.

"Flop Starz" was, as recorded by Disney, cable's number one watched animated series premiere for the "tween" demographic. Four million viewers have been reported as viewing it in no specific demographic. This spark continued, leading to the series to be television's top-rated animated series for kids (6–11) and tweens (9–14) for the first quarter of the year.

Worldwide, the episode garnered over 23.5 million viewers from the over one hundred and fifty territories in which it was broadcast, including the United Kingdom, Australia, and the United States. Disney Channel's vice president of programming for the UK, Scandinavia and emerging markets, has responded to the high ratings, explaining that it was an achievement due to the effort spent with marketing and voice overs.

=== "Gitchee Gitchee Goo" and merchandise ===
Several critics have positively reviewed the song "Gitchee Gitchee Goo" from the episode, stating that it "could probably have gotten radio play 20 years ago." Disney as well enjoyed it enough to ask the creators to write songs every episode. The song has since then made brief appearances in later episodes, either in "elevator music" form or as the song itself. The song was featured as an extended version on the album Disney Channel Playlist, which featured multiple songs from different Disney Channel artists. The song also was one of the twenty-six songs appearing on the series official soundtrack, released on September 29, 2009. The episode was one of several that was featured on the first volume DVD of season one titled "The Fast and the Phineas." In the DVD, it is paired with its production partner "Are You My Mummy?" Lara Bergen adapted the episode, along with the fellow season one episode "Lights, Candace, Action!" into a novella for young readers titled Runaway Hit. It was the second of a series of novelizations made from the series.

The extended version of "Gitchee Gitchee Goo" also appears in the Musical Cliptastic Countdown episode, having been voted as the most requested song of the show's first season; after the hypnotic single My Name Is Doof is performed, and the audience members had been hypnotized by Doofenshmirtz, Perry the Platypus, having been told by Major Monogram that they needed something even more catchy to counteract it, pulls down a curtain, therefore revealing the extended version and breaking the spell.
