= Ferb Fletcher =

Fictional character from Phineas and Ferb

- Phineas and Ferb character
- First appearance: "Rollercoaster" (2007)
- Created by: Dan Povenmire; Jeff "Swampy" Marsh
- Voiced by: Mitchel Musso (unaired pilot); Thomas Sangster (2007–2015); David Errigo Jr. (2018–present); Danny Jacob (singing voice)

In-universe information
- Full name: Ferbs Fletcher
- Nickname: Ferb
- Gender: Male
- Family: Lawrence Fletcher (father); Linda Flynn-Fletcher (step-mother); Phineas Flynn (step-brother); Candace Flynn (step-sister)
- Nationality: English-American

Ferbs "Ferb" Fletcher is a fictional character and the titular co-protagonist of the animated television series Phineas and Ferb. Voiced by British actor Thomas Sangster in Phineas and Ferb's original run and the film Across the 2nd Dimension (2011), American actor David Errigo Jr. in the Milo Murphy's Law episode "The Phineas and Ferb Effect", the film Candace Against the Universe (2020), and Phineas and Ferb's revival run, with a singing voice by series composer Danny Jacob, he was created by Phineas and Ferb founders Dan Povenmire and Jeff "Swampy" Marsh. He first appeared in the show's pilot episode, "Rollercoaster".

Ferb and his step-brother Phineas Flynn spend their days during summer vacation from school striving to have fun. They are featured in the majority of episodes as the A-Plot constructing large scale inventions or taking part in other outlandish activities. Ferb, an engineering genius, allows Phineas to do most of the talking for the pair and is "more of a man of action." When Ferb does speak, it is almost always a single sentence. In a conversation in the future time of "Phineas and Ferb's Quantum Boogaloo", it is revealed that he was at Camp David.

Ferb was named after a set-builder named Frank Leasure, a construction foreman on several Star Trek properties and a friend of Povenmire and Marsh. His wife Melinda, an artist on The Simpsons and King of the Hill, nicknamed him "Ferb". In "Vanessassary Roughness" Ferb explains that his name is short for something, but he didn't get a chance to say it. On Twitter, Povenmire announced that Ferb was actually short for "Ferbs". He cares for Vanessa Doofenshmirtz (daughter of Dr. Heinz Doofenshmirtz) and saves her in the same episode when she gets tangled up and a lawn mower almost gets her, but he is able to save her with a giant tool which appears to be an exaggerated version of a Swiss Army Knife. In "Summer Belongs To You" Vanessa asks Candace what Ferb is short for; Candace realizes she doesn't know herself what it is short for. In the fourth season episode "Act Your Age", he as a teenager appears to be in a relationship with Vanessa. Ferb's design is based on a rectangle and also shaped like an "F" and is inspired by the style of late animator Tex Avery. As a character, Ferb has been critically well-received and appears in several pieces of Phineas and Ferb merchandise, including toys, T-shirts, and video games.

== Role in Phineas and Ferb ==
Ferb comes from a blended family, a premise the creators considered underused in children's programming and which reflected Marsh's own upbringing. He was born on February 29. Ferb's birth mother is never revealed, but the series shows that both Ferb and his father Lawrence hail from England. Lawrence married Ferb's step-mother Linda after meeting her at a 1990s concert by the fictional band Love Händel. Marsh considers explaining the family background "not important to the kids' lives. They are a great blended family and that's all we need to know." Ferb and his family live in the fictional town of Danville, in a large, suburban neighborhood. Throughout their summer vacation, Ferb and Phineas conceive outrageous schemes to defeat boredom while sitting lazily beneath a tree in their backyard. Phineas mainly conceives each project while Ferb spearheads its construction. Their activities are almost always beyond the capability of a typical child and have included toy design (in "Toy to the World"); treasure-hunting (in "The Ballad of Badbeard"); engineering (in "It's About Time!"); and restaurant management (in "Chez Platypus"). Ferb's step-sister, Candace, is always trying to get the two in trouble with their mother for their schemes, but is never able to. Ferb talks very rarely, usually having only one line per episode. He speaks with a British accent. There are a total of 28 episodes in which he had no lines and the longest he ever spoke was in "The Lizard Whisperer" when he gave a speech which totalled 129 words.

== Character ==
=== Creation and conception ===
Ferb was created by Phineas and Ferb creators Dan Povenmire and Jeff "Swampy" Marsh, who originally met as layout artists on the Fox Network animated series The Simpsons. Phineas and Ferb was inspired by their boyhood memories of summer vacation; Povenmire and Marsh both felt the theme of school in television had fallen to redundancy and wanted to create a series that took place solely in the summertime.

Ferb's name was derived from that of a mutual friend of Povenmire and Marsh named Frank, who "owns more tools than anyone [they] know." Frank was a set-builder who had worked building and designing sets for shows such as Star Trek: Deep Space Nine. Frank's wife disliked Frank's name and gave him the unusual nickname "Ferb".

=== Design and voice ===
"We knew Thomas Sangster from Love Actually and Nanny McPhee and he was able to express so much. But he did it in a studio in London and never met or saw anybody else working on the show. He'd seen one episode where somebody else was the voice that he had to portray and he just got it."

— Jeff "Swampy" Marsh on casting Ferb

Ferb was given a simplistic structure so that young audiences would be able to draw him easily. As with the other characters of Phineas and Ferb, Ferb's design is constructed of geometric shapes in homage to animator Tex Avery. Ferb's head is based on a rectangle with a wider top than bottom. A square is used for his nose, and an egg-shaped oval is used for his eyes. The eye furthest from the screen is always drawn larger than the other. Povenmire uses a nine-step process to draw Ferb, starting with his head and ending with touch ups.

Ferb was originally going to be voiced by actor Mitchel Musso. However, when Phineas and Ferb was picked up as a full series, Povenmire and Marsh chose to make Ferb British and cast Thomas Sangster as his voice. However, they enjoyed Musso to a level that they recast him as the voice of the character Jeremy Johnson; although Musso no longer voiced a title character, his new role allowed him more lines. Sangster himself is a British actor and was among several cast members hired that hailed from England. Marsh himself had lived in the country for seven years and developed a fondness for the culture and people.

=== Personality ===
Ferb was devised as a character devoid of ill will. Marsh explained, "It was important to us that [Phineas and Ferb] never did anything with any animosity. They never tried to get their sister in trouble or outsmart their mother and get away with it." Instead, he and his brother create things for the sheer enjoyment of it or to help out others ("and for the ladies"); for example, Ferb and Phineas carve Candace's face into Mount Rushmore for her birthday, set up a roller derby for a rematch race with his Grandmother Betty Jo's old rival, create a haunted house for their friend Isabella to cure her hiccups and make a super-computer to find out what to do for their mom after being so kind to them.

Povenmire and Marsh intended for Ferb's creative drive to stem primarily from a desire to have fun, and in one episode, "Thaddeus and Thor", Phineas openly confirms this as his and his brother's only goal in their daily schemes – though Ferb adds that they also do it "for the ladies."

In the original pitch to overseas Walt Disney Company executives, Povenmire and Marsh constructed storyboards and recorded them with dialogue and sound effects. As a prototype, Ferb did not speak at all. However, after considering comedy's "big duos" including Wallace and Gromit and Jay and Silent Bob, the creators chose to have Ferb speak at least once in most episodes (but in "Summer Belongs To You" he spoke nine times and in "The Lizard Whisperer" gives an entire short speech that lasts about 45 seconds), but to have him remain silent and allow Phineas to speak for him the majority of the time. Although Ferb's taciturnity is generally not commented on in the series, Phineas mentions it while he and his brother were in England on the episode "A Hard Day's Knight": "I'll be the top half since I tend to do more of the talking and you will be on the bottom part because of your long spindly legs". Despite being quiet, Ferb is a polyglot, being able to speak in human, animal, and alien tongues.

Ferb also seems to possess good insight, which is probably the main character trait, other than his silence, distinguishing his character from Phineas. Jean Yoo, an official press member for Disney Channel, notes that when Ferb does speak, "it always shows a greater understanding of the situation than his countenance would indicate." He usually says one or two sentences per episode, such as "They [platypuses] are the only mammals to lay eggs," "Sharks have to keep moving forward, or they'll drown," and shortly after, "Well, he [Buford] was all up in my face," or "Candace, we [Phineas and Ferb] are just kids." He also has a crush on Vanessa Doofenshmirtz.

== Reception ==
Critical reception for the character has been generally positive. Emily Ashby of Common Sense Media describes him as a "go-to engineering guru" and considers him and Phineas to be "partner[s] in crime." Susan Stewart, reviewing the show in The New York Times, notes that Phineas and Ferb "work on a heroic scale and are apparently not limited by the laws of nature." Josh Jackson, editor of Paste magazine, listed Ferb's "dry wit" as the third of five reasons as to why the series is the "Best Kids Show on TV," writing that "Ferb gets about one line per episode, but it's always a doozy."

Ed Stetzer, Richie Stanley, and Jason Hayes, author's the book Lost and Found: The Younger Unchurched and the Churches That Reach Them, wrote that Ferb and Phineas, along with the cast of High School Musical, are examples of creating a "whole new culture" in households. Stetzer, Stanley, and Hayes continued to write that "[O]ur culture has connected with media that shows not only the Cinderella and Prince Charming life we all wish for, but also the life in which we all live with real trials, real joys, and real fears."

"Backyard Beach," a song Danny Jacob performs as Ferb in the episode "Lawn Gnome Beach Party of Terror," became very popular among viewers and was voted as the second best song in the series by viewers in the special 2009 event, "Phineas and Ferb's Musical Cliptastic Countdown". The best, according to viewers, was "Gitchee Gitchee Goo" from "Flop Starz," which Jacob performs in as Ferb. Ferb is also credited as the singer in the music video version of "My Ride from Outer Space" from the episode "The Chronicles of Meap" (actually performed again by Danny Jacob).

== In other media ==
Besides the series Phineas and Ferb, Ferb has been featured in several other pieces of merchandise from the series. To date, he has appeared in all Phineas and Ferb novelizations, published by Disney Press. Ferb appears in the Nintendo DS video game based on the series, simply titled Phineas and Ferb. Dan Povenmire has said that he saw nothing of the game until its release date, on which he was given a copy for free. Phineas and Ferb made a cameo in the MAD sketch "The Straight A-Team" where they decided to beat the Straight A-Team. They appear again in the sketch "DolPhineas and Ferb Tale" where they are spoofed alongside the film Dolphin Tale. Their design in MAD was unrealistic to their regular design.

Plush toys of the character, along with toys representing Phineas and Perry, have been manufactured. Ferb also appears on most of the Phineas and Ferb T-shirts. Ferb is set to appear in the forthcoming comic book series based on the series, though details are unconfirmed. Costumed versions of Ferb and Phineas have appeared in Disneyland, for the pre-taping of the annual Walt Disney World Christmas Day Parade.
