= List of Phineas and Ferb characters =

The majority of the series' main characters as seen at the end of "Rollercoaster: The Musical!". Clockwise from top left: Vanessa, Dr. Doofenshmirtz, Jeremy, the giant floating baby head, Candace, Stacy, Linda, Lawrence, Coltrane, Buford, Gretchen, Ginger, Milly, Baljeet, Ferb, Perry the Platypus, Phineas, Isabella, Irving, Holly, Adyson, and Katie.

The following is a character list of main and secondary characters on the Disney Channel series Phineas and Ferb.

== Main characters ==
=== Phineas Flynn ===
Phineas Flynn (voiced by Vincent Martella) is the main character of the series. He has red hair. His age is not mentioned. Phineas, along with his stepbrother Ferb Fletcher, star in the A-Plot of every episode. The series concerns Phineas's attempts to avoid boredom by finding something new to do every day of the summer vacation. He does this with his much less-talkative stepbrother Ferb, and often with many other neighborhood children. He is known to be very selfless and energetic. Phineas has many catch phrases like "Oh, there you are, Perry." or "Hey, Ferb! I know what we're going to do today!" and "Hey, where's Perry?".

Phineas comes from a blended family. The creators chose this arrangement because they considered it underused in children's programming as well as from Marsh's experiences in one. As a character, Phineas has received a positive critical response, with one reviewer describing him and his brother as a "comical pairing." Phineas appears in Phineas and Ferb merchandise, including plush toys, t-shirts, and a video game.

=== Ferb Fletcher ===
Ferb Fletcher (voiced by Thomas Brodie-Sangster between 2007 and 2015, and by David Errigo Jr. since 2018) is a boy of very few words. He is Phineas's green-haired, intelligent but laconic stepbrother from the United Kingdom. Created by Phineas and Ferb co-founders Dan Povenmire and Jeff "Swampy" Marsh, he first appeared in the show's pilot episode, "Rollercoaster."

Ferb and his stepbrother Phineas Flynn spend their days during their summer vacation having lots of fun. They are featured in every episode's A-Plot constructing large scale inventions or taking part in other outlandish activities. Ferb, an engineering genius, allows Phineas to do most of the talking for the pair and is described as "more of a man of action," by Phineas, which makes him more of a plot device than a developed character. Ferb is more likely to sing than speak, but most often has a one-liner in the episodes. Ferb is named after a friend of the show's creators who was an expert on tools and, at times, stayed rather silent.

=== Candace Flynn ===
Candace Gertrude Flynn (voiced by Ashley Tisdale, Shelby Young (Disney Broken Karaoke)) is characterized as Phineas's sixteen-year-old previously fifteen-year-old biological sister and Ferb's stepsister. The character's personality is based on Jennifer Grey's character in Ferris Bueller's Day Off. Candace first appeared in the pilot episode, "Rollercoaster".

Candace was originally designed to antagonize her brothers. In most episodes, she appears to really disapprove of their inventions and attempt to get them in trouble by showing their mom the inventions. Her catchphrases are: "Mom! Phineas and Ferb are...!" and "You are so busted!", and while she never proves anything to her mother, Candace persists in the majority of episodes. Whenever she attempts to "bust" her brothers, Phineas and Ferb's work unintentionally disappears before their mother sees it, and the boys appear to be involved in simple activities. Usually, Candace is shown stuttering "Buh-buh-buh-but...!", while her mother is shown forcibly taking her away and disregarding Candace's actions as crazy and childish.

Dan Povenmire described Candace's character: "Candace does get frustrated. She thinks it's not fair—that if she were doing the things they're doing, she'd get in big trouble. It's not, 'I'm going to get those guys and ruin their lives.' She does bust them later in the season, but there are a couple of twists to it." There are moments in the series when Candace appears to enjoy her brother's inventions, and although she frequently seems to overlook the fact that Phineas and Ferb openly care about her, Candace is shown to care more about their well-being than busting them. In the "Traffic Cam Caper" episode, when Phineas is in peril, Candace goes out of her way to save him, allowing a disc containing footage of Phineas and Ferb's projects to be stolen by Perry. Also, when Phineas delivers a very heartfelt speech at his birthday party thanking his friends, Candace seems so touched that she destroys another disc she intended to use to bust him and Ferb ("Clipshow").

Candace is best friends with Stacy Hirano, and is also good friends with Vanessa Doofenshmirtz, the daughter of Perry's nemesis, Dr. Heinz Doofenshmirtz, the main antagonist in the series. Candace and her family appear unaware that their pet platypus Perry, portrayed as a secret agent, fights Dr. Doofenshmirtz. Candace also appears unaware that Perry's battles with Dr. Doofenshmirtz are often the cause of the disappearance of Phineas and Ferb's inventions. Her character has appeared in Dr. Doofenshmirtz's lair on a number of occasions, but never seems to know where Perry goes everyday. Vanessa's character knows Perry personally, and seems unaware of the fact that Candace is part of Perry's host family. The friendship between Candace and Vanessa's characters is based on their ongoing failed attempts to prove something about a family member to their mothers.

Candace has an obvious crush on Jeremy Johnson, but for a long time, she is oblivious to the fact that he likes her back. The series portrays Candace as unphotogenic and self-conscious of what Jeremy would think if he saw the many photos of her posing awkwardly or with embarrassing facial expressions.

The depth of Candace has received positive critical acclaim and appears in other media such as video games. Common Sense Media rated Candace as the 10th worst TV role model, claiming that "her primary motivations are pleasing her boyfriend and getting her brothers in trouble" and she was "a very screechy, whiny stereotype of a girl", which could reinforce gender stereotypes a lot.

In "Phineas and Ferb's Quantum Boogaloo", it is revealed that Candace will have three children in the future: Xavier, Fred and Amanda, with Xavier and Fred behaving similarly to Phineas and Ferb, while Amanda takes after Candace.

Candace appears in the film Candace Against the Universe, when Phineas goes to great lengths to rescue her from an alien race that kidnaps her to save their planet.

=== Perry the Platypus ===
Perry the Platypus (vocal effects by Dee Bradley Baker), a.k.a. Agent P, is Phineas and Ferb's pet platypus and first appeared along with a large portion of the main cast in the pilot episode "Rollercoaster." Perry is featured as the star of the B-Plot for all but one episode of the series, (Season 2 Ep 10a: “Oh There You Are, Perry!”). Alongside his arch-nemesis Dr. Heinz Doofenshmirtz. He is a primarily silent character, with the only noises being the occasional rattling of his bill. Toward the beginning and end of most episodes, a character, often Phineas, can be found addressing Perry's absence with "Where's Perry?" and "Oh, there you are, Perry.", respectively, which are also both titles of episodes.

In Phineas and Ferb the Movie: Across the 2nd Dimension, an alternate reality (yet more evil and ruthless) version of Perry (known as Platyborg) appears. Platyborg would later return in the episode sequel, Tales from the Resistance: Back to the 2nd Dimension.

=== Dr. Heinz Doofenshmirtz ===
Dr. Heinz "Doof" Doofenshmirtz (voiced by Dan Povenmire) is an evil scientist appearing in all but one episode's B-Plots thus far. He is the father to teenage Vanessa Doofenshmirtz and is the head of his own company, Doofenshmirtz Evil Inc., which has its own jingle. Depending on the episode, Dr. Doofenshmirtz's main goal is to either destroy or rule the tri-state area, which was suggested to him as a teenager on a failed date with Linda Flynn-Fletcher as a starting point before taking over the world. Routinely bumbling, incompetent, and forgetful, almost all of Doofenshmirtz's plans—always involving various gadgets and/or inventions—have been thwarted by Perry the Platypus. However, a few of his schemes were quite successful, such as in the 2014 special Phineas and Ferb Save Summer, when Doofenshmirtz moved the Earth away from its original orbit to bring on an early autumn, much to Perry's distress. His catchphrases include "A platypus? (Perry puts on his hat) Perry the Platypus?!", and after most defeats, "Curse you, Perry the Platypus!!"

His contraptions are almost all named "[something]-inator", and in "Unfair Science Fair" it is revealed that his first invention as a child was simply called "Inator".

Throughout the series, Doofenshmirtz's flashbacks (which are often shown after Perry has been captured) explore his mentally abusive and lonely childhood growing up in the fictional village Gimmelshtump, Druelselstein. Before becoming an evil scientist, Doofenshmirtz was a bratwurst street vendor until being put out of business by the hot dog industry. Doofenshmirtz usually monologues and displays acts of cartoon-style physical violence towards his nemesis Perry, a skilled anthropomorphic platypus secret agent. His last name is frequently abbreviated to "Doof". Doofenshmirtz appears in several merchandise pieces, particularly the book series, and the video game. Doofenshmirtz, however much he wants to be evil, is not a bad guy at heart, and, with the help of his daughter Vanessa, comes to realize by the end of the fourth season that he can actually "do good". In "The O.W.C.A. Files", Doofenshmirtz has qualified as a member of the titular secret agency because he was briefly raised by ocelots. Despite this he returns to his evil ways at the beginning of the fifth season.

In the 2011 TV film, Phineas and Ferb the Movie: Across the 2nd Dimension, an alternate reality (yet much more intelligent and successful) version of Dr. Doofenshmirtz appears, with the regular Doofenshmirtz serving as a supporting character. 2nd Doofenshmirtz later returns in the episode sequel "Tales from the Resistance: Back to the 2nd Dimension".

== Supporting characters ==
=== Isabella Garcia-Shapiro ===
Isabella Garcia-Shapiro (voiced by Alyson Stoner) is a Jewish Mexican American girl. She is one of the brothers' best friends and has a big crush on Phineas Flynn of which he is unaware, though he has shown he cares a lot for her from time to time. Her first appearance is in the pilot episode. She is known for the famous catchphrase, "Whatcha doin'?" (which she doesn't like when other people besides her say) and is the leader of the Fireside Girls troop. The troop often helps Phineas and Ferb in their projects. She is named after series creator Dan Povenmire's oldest daughter.

=== Baljeet Tjinder ===
Baljeet Tjinder (/ˌbælˈʒiːt/ bal-ZHEET; also known as Baljeet Rai; voiced by Maulik Pancholy) is Phineas' and Ferb's friend and neighbor. He wears blue overalls. An intellectual and polite boy who moved to Danville from India, he often helps the boys with their ideas and displays his knowledge of mathematics and trivia. The series details his relationships with various girls, from old playmate Mishti, to Fireside Girl Ginger. Baljeet has a complicated relationship with Buford van Stomm.

=== Buford van Stomm ===
Buford van Stomm (voiced by Bobby Gaylor) started out as a bully, particularly towards Baljeet and Phineas, but quickly changed into more of a frenemy, helping Phineas, Ferb, and their friends on various occasions instead of acting solely antagonistically with his actual antagonistic actions toned down. He was also not called a bully nearly as often, especially as the series went on, but Baljeet remained his primary target, the two even singing a duet in one episode where they describe each other as "frenemies" and "my least favorite brother", while his relationship with Phineas became a one-sided rivalry on his part when he was not aiding him. Phineas believes that Buford only bullies others out of boredom, thus he often invites him to keep his mind occupied. By contrast, Buford leaves Ferb alone, likely due to Ferb subduing him easily when he tried to intimidate him in his debut episode. Buford also began displaying hidden talents and interests, such as speaking French in "Summer Belongs to You", to give his character more depth, though he still wished to keep this information secret under threat of pain for fear it would ruin his tough guy image. In "Act Your Age", he appears to have become a full-fledged friend and a sensitive artist type. He heavily resembles his mother in appearance and is stated on at least one occasion to be of Dutch descent.

=== Linda Flynn-Fletcher ===
Linda Flynn-Fletcher (voiced by Caroline Rhea) is the mother of Phineas and Candace and stepmother of Ferb. Unaware of the large-scale projects that Phineas and Ferb create on a daily basis, Candace often drags her away a lot from other interests in an attempt to get the boys in trouble. Each creation is somehow destroyed or eliminated moments before "Mom" arrives, leaving Candace quite dumbfounded and Linda reluctant to believe Candace. Linda was also a one-hit wonder known as "Lindana" with her song, "I'm Lindana and I Wanna Have Fun". That fact possibly makes her, as a singer, a parody of Cyndi Lauper, because of Lauper's hit "Girls Just Want to Have Fun", and because both of them were famous singers in the 1980s (Linda fictionally). Her single is used as elevator music throughout the series. Her surname is not consistent throughout the series; in at least one episode, Candace refers to her as "Linda Flynn". She is based on Dan Povenmire's sister, also named Linda. She went on a date with Heinz Doofenshmirtz during their mid-teens, and she was the one who inspired him to take over the tri-state area as a starting point for worldwide domination when he sarcastically stated that he would rule the world. However, their relationship did not progress further following this short-lived interaction.

=== Lawrence Fletcher ===
Lawrence Fletcher (voiced by Richard O'Brien) is the father of Ferb and stepfather of Phineas and Candace. Lawrence sells antiques, is from the United Kingdom and is portrayed like a sitcom dad as being scatterbrained and unaware of what is going on. He often agrees to follow Phineas's instructions and even forces Candace to cooperate as if he considers Phineas and Ferb's skills normal. Unlike the boys' mother, he has seen some of the boys' inventions; he has not reacted negatively, and apparently believes that their mother approves. His precise surname is a matter of some dispute; in at least one episode, Isabella addresses him as "Mr. Flynn". Jeff "Swampy" Marsh has said that Lawrence Fletcher is very similar to his stepfather, Bill.

=== Major Monogram ===
Major Francis Monogram (voiced by Jeff "Swampy" Marsh) is one of the heads of the O.W.C.A. (Organization Without a Cool Acronym) Department and Perry the Platypus' boss. He usually appears in a Nehru jacket on a giant screen giving Perry instructions for his next mission to stop Dr. Heinz Doofenshmirtz's endless attempts to take over the tri-state area. His uniform prominently features the initials "MM." He has a monobrow and wears a toupée. Sometimes, he is shown to have a lack of details about what Doofenshmirtz is up to, and orders Perry to go stop it as usual. Just like Doofenshmirtz, he has also appeared in every episode of the series to date, except Isabella and the Temple of Sap.

=== Carl the Intern ===
Carl the Intern (voiced by Tyler Alexander Mann) is Major Monogram's young unpaid intern of the O.W.C.A. (Organization Without a Cool Acronym) in charge of video taping Monogram when he is being interviewed and talking to Agent P. He is a bit careless, wears glasses, and sometimes forgets to focus the camera correctly. He comes from a family of unpaid interns, and desperately wants to be appreciated by Major Monogram, treating him as a father figure. He briefly replaced the Major in "Phineas and Ferb Save Summer", but went back to his old job at the end of the episode when O.W.C.A. was revived; by the time of "Act Your Age", he has taken this role permanently. Carl has also stated that he has no sense of smell because he was born without nostrils.

=== Stacy Hirano ===
Stacy Hirano (voiced by Kelly Hu) is Candace's best friend. She is of Japanese heritage, and often is pressured by her mother to become a "doctor or a lawyer or a doctor". Stacy is shown to be annoyed by Candace's constant attempts to bust Phineas and Ferb, and would prefer to just have fun with the inventions; she also occasionally gets annoyed with Candace's gushing about her relationship with Jeremy. She's in a relationship with Jeremy's friend and bandmate, Coltrane. During the episode "Happy Birthday, Isabella", she finds out about Perry's secret identity, but doesn't lose her memories afterwards, because she is not related to Perry's host family and has promised to keep his identity secret. She would become an O.W.C.A. agent in the episode "Agent T (for Teen)". In "Phineas and Ferb's Quantum Boogaloo", it is revealed over a phone call with "future Candace" that she has become the President of Uruguay, twenty years after the series takes place.

=== Jeremy Johnson ===
Jeremy Johnson (voiced by Mitchel Musso between 2007 and 2020, David Errigo, Jr. since 2025) is Candace Flynn's crush and later boyfriend. He is seventeen years old previously sixteen. He works at Mr. Slushy Burger (sometimes named Mr. Slushy Dawg). In "Summer Belongs to You!", he and Candace begin dating. He is also in a band named "The Incidentals".

=== Vanessa Doofenshmirtz ===
Vanessa Doofenshmirtz (voiced by Olivia Olson) is Heinz and Charlene Doofenshmirtz's teenage daughter, introduced in the episode "Tree To Get Ready". She is very sarcastic, mild-mannered, cynical, and dresses in a goth style. Vanessa is aware that her father is an evil scientist and knows about her father's nemesis Perry the Platypus. She is often exasperated by her father whenever he tries to establish a "father-daughter" bond between them as he doesn't really understand her interests, or refuses to acknowledge that she is growing up and often assumes that she is also interested in "evil." She often tries to convince her mom that her dad is an "evil scientist", but much like Candace, also ultimately always fails when she does appear trying to catch him in the act, much to her dismay. She does, however, occasionally show appreciation for what he does for her, as he is clearly devoted to her (he once taught her how to drive and traveled halfway around the world after she got lost). Also, despite denying it so many times, Vanessa admits that she may be a little evil, as she once helped her father escape from custody by posing her hairdryer as a pistol to fool Major Monogram and Perry into releasing Doofenshmirtz, as shown in the special Phineas and Ferb: Summer Belongs to You!. Although Ferb has a crush on her, she remains oblivious to his affections as she already had a punk (not goth) boyfriend named "Johnny", whom she later broke up with in the episode "Minor Monogram". She is in a relationship with Monty Monogram, the son of Major Monogram; however "Act Your Age" depicts her becoming involved with Ferb ten years down the line.

In addition to this, in deleted scenes of the 2011 TV film, Phineas and Ferb: Across the 2nd Dimension, Vanessa makes a cameo appearance, along with an alternative reality version of herself (2nd Dimension Vanessa). Later, 2nd Dimension Vanessa appeared in the episode sequel, Tales from the Resistance: Back to the 2nd Dimension.

== Recurring characters ==
=== Fireside Girls ===
The Fireside Girls are a group of ten girl scout–like girls led by Isabella in troop 46231. Isabella and the other Fireside Girls usually help Phineas and Ferb in their projects which, in turn, are at times created to help the Fireside Girls with a humanitarian cause.

Other members of the troop:

- Gretchen (voiced by Ariel Winter) wears glasses and has short auburn hair. She is the second in command in the troop and the first (besides Isabella) who had been addressed by name.
- Holly (voiced by Cymphonique Miller _{(Seasons 1–2)}, Diamond White _{(Season 2–Present)}, Dana Davis _{(as a teenager in "Act Your Age")}) has dark skin and black hair.
- Katie (voiced by Isabella Acres, Soleil McGhee _{(as a teenager in "Act Your Age")}) has blonde hair.
- Milly (voiced by Isabella Murad, Dannah Phirman _{(as a teenager in "Act Your Age")}) has curly, brown hair and freckles.
- Adyson Sweetwater (voiced by Madison Pettis) has straight, brown hair. She is the second member of the troop to be addressed by name, and the first to have been given a last name as well.
- Ginger Hirano (voiced by Tiffany Espensen _{(seasons 1–2)}, Michaela Zee _{(season 3–Present)}, Ming-Na Wen _{(as a teenager in "Act Your Age")}) The younger sister of Candace's best friend Stacy. She has a crush on Baljeet, and is shown as his girlfriend in "Act Your Age".

=== Norm ===
Norm (voiced by John Viener) is a giant robot man created by Dr. Doofenshmirtz to destroy Perry the Platypus. Introduced in "Greece Lightning," he is a giant robotic mild-mannered businessman who often says, "The enemy of platypus is man." Norm has also appeared in other episodes. For instance, in the episode, "Traffic Cam Caper," Perry borrows Norm as a ride to steal the traffic cam disk, for it has evidence that Perry is a secret agent. He was once a part of the O.W.C.A. but was fired because he was not an animal. Later in the series, he is depicted as Doofenshmirtz's sidekick and servant who makes frequent mistakes such as cooking eggs with the shells on or serving Doof chocolate cake for breakfast, though always staying cheery. In the episode "A Real Boy", Norm reveals that he has always wanted to be a human boy and considers Doofenshmirtz his father and Vanessa his sister.

In the 2011 TV film, Phineas and Ferb the Movie: Across the 2nd Dimension, a group of alternate reality (yet much more menacing and successful) versions of Norm (known as Norm-Bots) appear, with the regular Norm making a cameo.

=== Vivian Garcia-Shapiro ===
Vivian Garcia-Shapiro (voiced by Eileen Galindo), or simply "Viv," is Isabella's mother and lives across the street from Phineas and Ferb. She is a Jewish Mexican, one of Linda's best friends, and plays upright bass in a jazz band with Linda Flynn and Jeremy's mom. She is known for talking very fast and often making useless comments such as, "Oh, Candace, look how tall you've gotten.", despite seeing Candace only a week earlier. She is fluent in both English and Spanish.

=== Jenny Brown ===
Jenny Brown (voiced by Alyson Stoner) is Candace's second best friend and a big hippie. She wears a peace symbol necklace and says that she hopes for world peace.

=== Pinky ===
Pinky (vocals by Dee Bradley Baker) is Isabella's pet chihuahua. Much like Perry the Platypus, Pinky also lives a double-life as a secret agent for the O.W.C.A. under the codename, "Agent Pinky" in a division run by a commander named Wanda, a.k.a. Admiral Acronym. Pinky's nemesis is Professor Poofenplotz. Although she does not like dog food, Pinky will eat just about anything—especially her favorite; grilled cheese sandwiches (as seen in the episode "Journey to the Center of Candace"), and even inedible objects, having once accidentally swallowed Isabella's Fireside Girl sash. Pinky always shakes as an ongoing joke about the behavior of other Chihuahuas. She first appeared in the episode "Journey to the Center of Candace", where Pinky plays a major role, as Phineas and Ferb shrink themselves (as well as a submarine) to miniature proportions to go inside Pinky to retrieve Isabella's sash. However, Pinky is distracted just before she can eat the sandwich by a black cat, and later Candace dwells upon the sandwich, unaware that Phineas and Ferb are inside it, and Phineas and Ferb are then swallowed, unaware that they are in the wrong body.

=== Charlene Doofenshmirtz ===
Charlene Doofenshmirtz (voiced by Allison Janney) is the former wife of Dr. Heinz Doofenshmirtz and shares custody of their daughter, Vanessa. Unaware of Dr. Doofenshmirtz's "evil" side, and in fact saying she does not believe someone can ever be truly evil, she divorced him due to a lack of common interests and having different life-goals. She is very wealthy and gives her ex-husband a large allowance each month. She is sometimes called by Vanessa who tries to "bust" her father, but to no avail. Charlene and Linda Flynn-Fletcher have been paired up in a cooking class owned by Chef Pierre and in "I Scream, You Scream" were distracted by both Candace and Vanessa at the same time. Despite being divorced with Doof, she still goes to Doofenshmirtz family reunions claiming that she "kept the name," as seen in "Thaddeus and Thor."

However, in the episode "Tales From the Resistance: Back to the 2nd Dimension" (the episode sequel to the 2011 TV film, "Phineas and Ferb: Across the 2nd Dimension"), it is shown that there is an alternate reality version of Charlene Doofenshmirtz. It turns out that 2nd Charlene is still married to 2nd Doof and actually shares much of his evil personality, and that their divorce was just a ruse to gain financial advantages during 2nd Doof's reign (such as receiving coupon mail, putting up junk yard sales, and going on separate vacation trips).

=== Suzy Johnson ===
Suzy Johnson (voiced by Kari Wahlgren), known as Little Suzy Johnson, is Jeremy's little sister. She has a high-pitched squeaky voice and appears very sweet and innocent. However, she is actually very spoiled and manipulative and very possessive over Jeremy, once telling Candace (who she hates), "There is only one girl in Jeremy's life", and thus will do anything to keep Candace away from her brother.

=== Grandpa Clyde and Grandma Betty Jo ===
Grandpa Clyde Flynn and Grandma Betty Jo Flynn (voiced by Barry Bostwick and Caroline Rhea respectively) are Linda's parents, Phineas and Candace's maternal grandparents, Lawrence's -in-laws, and Ferb's step-grandparents. Every summer, they invite the family along with many neighborhood kids to a lakehouse which Phineas calls, "Camp P&F". Though they are very old, they often participate in the kids' capers. Grandpa Clyde, like Phineas and Ferb, has a great sense of mechanics, as seen in "Crack That Whip!" Betty Jo is also shown in the same episode to have a fierce rivalry with Edna Hildagard, Jeremy and Suzy's grandmother.

=== Grandpa Reginald and Grandma Winifred ===
Grandpa Reginald Fletcher and Grandma Winifred Fletcher (voiced by Malcolm McDowell and Jane Carr) are Lawrence's parents, Ferb's paternal grandparents, Phineas and Candace's step grandparents, and Linda Flynn-Fletcher's -in-laws who reside in the United Kingdom. Reginald used to be a daredevil known as the Flying Fishmonger.

=== Roger Doofenshmirtz ===
Roger Doofenshmirtz (voiced by John O'Hurley) is mayor of Danville and Dr. Heinz Doofenshmirtz's younger brother. Heinz often states angrily that Roger is their mother's favorite son, and even wrote a song about it, "My Goody Two-Shoes Brother". In "Tree to Get Ready", Roger states that he is "the most handsome and charming man in the tri-state area". This enrages Doof a lot, who is convinced to use his latest -inator, the Poop-inator, to hypnotize the tri-state area pigeons into raining feces on Roger during his speech, when he receives the Key To The City.

=== Irving Du Bois ===
Irving Du Bois (voiced by Jack McBrayer) is Phineas' and Ferb's self-proclaimed biggest fan. He always carries a scrapbook that he filled with images and souvenirs from Phineas and Ferb's big ideas as well as a strand of Ferb's hair. Irving has an older brother Albert, who is self-nicknamed 'The Truth Detector.'

=== Django Brown ===
Django Brown (voiced by Alec Holden) is a good friend of Phineas and Ferb. Django is the son of the artist Beppo Brown from "Oil on Candace," who is famous for his work in making giant creations, from refrigerators to dental floss. He is named after co-creator Jeff "Swampy" Marsh's son, Django Marsh, who voices minor characters on the show.

=== Admiral Acronym ===
Admiral Wanda Acronym (voiced by Jane Leeves) is one of the heads of the O.W.C.A. (Organization Without a Cool Acronym) Department and Pinky the Chihuahua's boss. Just like Major Monogram, she usually appears on a giant screen giving Pinky instructions for his next mission to stop Professor Poofenplotz's endless attempts to take over the world.

Also, just like Monogram (who has an unpaid intern named Carl), Adrimal Acronym has her own unpaid intern named Carla, who bears some similar resemblances to Carl.

=== Professor Poofenplotz ===
Professor Esmeralda Poofenplotz (voiced by Amanda Plummer) is an old mad scientist and the nemesis of Agent Pinky, Isabella's pet Chihuahua. She is known for her silly attempts for worldwide domination. Her known schemes so far involve replacing handbags, stealing royal jelly, and searching for strong hairspray (her favorite is "Stiff Beauty" hairspray, which originally was only used by clowns). Needless to say, because of her somewhat arrogant personality, Poofenplotz has failed to know about the flaws of her schemes. And because of that, it has allowed Pinky to defeat her in return, leaving an humiliated Poofenplotz to yell out, "Curse you, Pinky the Chihuahua!!", similar to how Heinz Doofenshmirtz says whenever his plans get foiled by Perry the Platypus.

=== Love Händel ===
Love Händel is a rock band idolized by many in the Danville tri-state area, first seen in the episode, "Dude, We're Gettin' the Band Back Together!" Lawrence Fletcher and Linda Flynn shared their first kiss at a Love Händel concert. Shortly afterward, plagued by infighting caused by the pressures of a dwindling fanbase, Love Händel split up. Lead Singer Danny (voiced by Jaret Reddick) became the owner of Danny's Music Shop. Bass Player Bobbi Fabulous (voiced by Carlos Alazraqui) became the owner of Bobbi's Fashion Salon and Linda's hairdresser. Sherman "Swampy" (voiced by Steve Zahn) ended up working at the Danville Public Library, believing he had lost his sense of rhythm. Eventually, all three members are convinced to reunite for a concert in the Flynn/Fletcher's backyard, in which they sing their hit song, "You Snuck Your Way Right into My Heart." Love Handel occasionally reappears in other episodes and in the movie where they sing their songs. The band also made appearances in episodes of Milo Murphy's Law and Hamster and Gretel.

=== Monty Monogram ===
Monty Monogram (voiced by Seth Green) is Major Monogram's son and has been working in O.W.C.A. since "Minor Monogram". Vanessa Doofenshmirtz seems to become interested in him after she broke up with Johnny, and it is possible that he is slightly interested in her too, because he winks at her before leaving. They have coffee together in "Sipping with the Enemy", at which point they apparently begin to date one another. In "Minor Monogram", he has recently graduated from the "High School Without a Cool Acronym" (H.S.W.C.A.) and he really wants to fight evil following his dad's footsteps. Due to the rivalry between his father and Dr. Doofenshmirtz, he and Vanessa try to keep it secret from the two of them, aided by Perry and Carl (though the latter briefly blackmailed Monty in hopes of getting his help in earning Major Monogram's approval). In the special Phineas and Ferb Save Summer, Monty played a major role as he attempts to help rescue all of the captured agents and defeat the villains of L.O.V.E.M.U.F.F.I.N. in their plan to take over the world by sending it into a new Ice Age.

=== Dr. Hirano ===
Dr. Hirano (voiced by Ming-Na Wen) is Stacy and Ginger's mother. She removed Isabella's tonsils in, "I Scream, You Scream." She is often referred to through conversations between Candace and Stacy where Candace gratifies, "Stacy, you're a genius!" and Stacy replies, "Could you call my mom and tell her that?!" She is fluent in both English and Japanese.

=== Coltrane ===
Coltrane (voiced by Corbin Bleu) is Jeremy's friend and bandmate in "The Incidentals". He plays bass and football with Jeremy and his friends. During the summer, he begins a relationship with Stacy Hirano.

=== Rodney ===
Aloyse Everheart Elizabeth Otto Wolfgang Hypatia Gunther Galen Gary Cooper von Roddenstein (voiced by Joe Orrantia), or Rodney for short, is a bald evil scientist and a member of the villain organization L.O.V.E.M.U.F.F.I.N.. He serves as the main rival to Dr. Doofenshmirtz, believing him to a disappointment because of his constant failures. Throughout most of his appearances, Rodney attempts to best out on Doofenshmirtz to show that he's a much better villain, only to fail so many times (either due to Doofenshmirtz's antics or Perry's intervention). Similar to Doofenshmirtz, Rodney usually makes his own inventions and ends them with the suffix "-inizor". He also has his own robot apprentice named Chloe, whom Norm fell in love with. He also has a son named Orville, who usually helps him create his -inizors.

In the episode "Robot Rodeo", Rodney and the other L.O.V.E.M.U.F.F.I.N. members make fun of Doofenshmirtz because of his lack of time management, resulting in Doof completely scrapping his original plans and instead creating the "Eradicate Rodney's Inator-Inator", which has a built-in punching glove that is meant to destroy Rodney's inizor. The inator stays true to its word, and destroys Rodney's inizor, successfully getting back at Rodney and bringing him to tears, but not before shouting "What?! No fair!!", and then walking offstage where he isn't seen for the rest of the episode.

Rodney would later go on to appear as the antagonist in the 2014 episode special, "Phineas and Ferb Save Summer", where he learns that Doofenshmirtz has actually succeeded in moving the Earth away from the Sun to an early autumn with his latest -inator. Taking the opportunity to exploit this, Rodney leads L.O.V.E.M.U.F.F.I.N. into revealing themselves to the world and capturing all of O.W.C.A.'s agents. He even creates an -inizor (which is just ten times the size and strength of Doof's -inator) that will send the Earth into a new Ice Age if the world refuse to meet all of L.O.V.E.M.U.F.F.I.N.'s demands. However, in the end, Doofenshmirtz (who is completely disgusted by Rodney's true goal for worldwide domination) manages to defeat Rodney, who then gets arrested by Monty Monogram and taken into O.W.C.A. custody.

== Other characters ==
There are several characters that reappear as recurring jokes, such as a farmer, voiced by Corey Burton, and his wife, voiced by Jennifer L. Hughes. The wife always admonishes her husband for forgetting something before rhetorically asking if he thought that something would fall from the sky, and then it does and sometimes hits her hard. For example, in the episode, "Leave the Busting to Us", the wife says, "I can't believe you bought a bunny farm but forgot to buy any bunnies! Did you really think the bunnies would fall from the sky?!" A pack of rabbits then falls from the sky and hits her.

Another minor character is the Giant Floating Baby Head. In an interview, Dan Povenmire stated that the head had originated from a storyboard panel that writer Mike Diederich had drawn which director Rob Hughes found hilarious enough to create an entire bit around. It first appears in "One Good Scare Ought to Do It!" and has since appeared in several other episodes.

Dr. Doofenshmirtz's mother (voiced by Cloris Leachman) has appeared. She refers to Roger being her favorite child and often ignores Heinz. Albert (voiced by Diedrich Bader), is Irving's brother who appeared in "Not Phineas and Ferb", "The Doof Side of the Moon", and "Nerds of a Feather".

Buford's mother (voiced by Pamela Adlon) and Baljeet's mother (voiced by Meera Syal) have both appeared.

"Horse in a Bookcase" is an in-universe music video that features the titular character. It later briefly appears in Milo Murphy's Law.
