= Rollercoaster (Phineas and Ferb) =

- Phineas and Ferb episode
- Promotional artwork for the episode detailing Phineas and Ferb riding their roller coaster.
- Episode no.: Season 1 Episode 1a
- Directed by: Dan Povenmire
- Written by: Jeff "Swampy" Marsh; Dan Povenmire
- Production code: 101a
- Original air date: August 17, 2007

Episode chronology
← Previous —	Next → "Candace Loses Her Head"
- Phineas and Ferb season 1

"Rollercoaster" is the series premiere of the American animated musical-comedy television series Phineas and Ferb, as well as the first half of the first episode of the series. The episode was originally broadcast on Disney Channel in the United States on August 17, 2007, as a preview of the series. The episode follows the series' protagonists, Phineas and Ferb, as they build an extremely large roller coaster starting in their backyard and going throughout the city. In a subplot, the protagonists' pet platypus Perry is a "secret agent" codenamed Agent P who is assigned the mission to investigate the plans of an evil but silly scientist named Dr. Heinz Doofenshmirtz.

Series' creators Dan Povenmire and Jeff "Swampy" Marsh wrote "Rollercoaster", the former of whom also directed the episode. The two used the episode to pitch the series to Disney. They recorded a set of storyboard reels, which Povenmire voiced over and sent them overseas. When originally aired on August 17, 2007, "Rollercoaster" peaked high ratings in several categories, leading to the episode being the second highest-rated telecast Disney Channel received in its recorded history. The preview garnered a recorded amount of 10.8 million viewers. In 2011, a half-hour musical episode titled "Rollercoaster: The Musical!" was released for the second season, which reenacts the events of "Rollercoaster" in musical form.

== Plot ==
External videos
- Phineas and Ferb First Episode Rollercoaster S1 E1 Full Episode @disneyxd — Official upload of the episode onto YouTube

Phineas (Vincent Martella) and his quiet stepbrother Ferb (Thomas Brodie-Sangster) are sitting lazily under a big tree in their backyard when they decide to construct a large roller coaster. With their mother Linda (Caroline Rhea) at the grocery store, their suspicious and gullible sister Candace (Ashley Tisdale) wants to catch them in the act and "bust" them.

Candace goes to the store to tell their Mom of the boys' activity, though she is keen on neglecting it, while their neighbor and best friend Isabella (Alyson Stoner), who has a crush on Phineas, goes up to him and asks "Whatcha doin'?". Phineas and Ferb begin working on the coaster. Meanwhile, Phineas and Ferb's pet platypus Perry (Dee Bradley Baker) begins to perform his daily act as a "secret agent" codenamed Agent P, being informed by his short-tempered boss Major Francis Monogram (Jeff "Swampy" Marsh) that his arch-nemesis, an evil and eccentric scientist named Dr. Heinz Doofenshmirtz (Dan Povenmire), who uses ridiculously complicated schemes to take over the Tri-State Area, has bought 80% of the Tri-State Area's tin foil. Perry darts off to investigate what Dr. Doofenshmirtz is doing. With their rollercoaster finally finished, Phineas and Ferb unveil it to the neighborhood children, including Isabella. The children ride the rollercoaster, which twists around the city. Doofenshmirtz, meanwhile, reveals that he is using the tin foil to cover the eastern seaboard, then using a magnet to pull it, thereby reversing the Earth's rotation with the Magnetism Magnifier. Perry fights him, but Doofenshmirtz manages to get the magnet activated. However, Doofenshmirtz soon learns that his plan is flawed because the magnet has only taken the tin foil off the eastern seaboard, forming it into a 2-ton giant ball. Seeing that the ball is heading towards them, Doofenshmirtz and Perry attempt to separate the magnet from his machine to stop it.

Perry attempts to solve the problem by hooking the magnet to a helicopter, causing the magnet to go with it. This attempt is unsuccessful, and Doofenshmirtz and the top of his building are sent rolling away by the tin foil ball. The magnet attracts the Magnetism Magnifier, which picks up the entire rollercoaster, preventing Linda from seeing it. Perry cuts the cable, making the rollercoaster drop to the ground, then jumps into the rollercoaster while placing his hat onto Isabella to avoid blowing his cover. Phineas looks behind him and utters, "Oh, there you are, Perry." The rollercoaster reaches the broken end of the track and starts flying across the world and into space, while Candace makes her mother drive home to see that Phineas and Ferb are not there. However, the rollercoaster lands in the tree in their backyard, while Phineas and Ferb fall out, leaving Linda able to see her children but not the rollercoaster, so she still does not believe Candace. As the other children fall out of the tree, the episode ends with Isabella having a friendly conversation with the stepbrothers before returning home, as the rollercoaster explodes (causing Candace to call for Linda again, but Linda once again dismisses her) and the giant tin foil ball rolls around town.

== Voice cast ==
- Vincent Martella as Phineas Flynn
- Ashley Tisdale as Candace Flynn, Additional Voices
- Thomas Sangster as Ferb Fletcher
- Caroline Rhea as Linda Flynn-Fletcher
- Alyson Stoner as Isabella Garcia-Shapiro, Additional Voices
- Dan Povenmire as Dr. Heinz Doofenshmirtz, Factory Manager
- Jeff "Swampy" Marsh as Major Monogram, Additional Voices
- Dee Bradley Baker as Perry the Platypus, Additional Voices

== Production ==
=== Conception ===
An original storyboard panel from the pitch reel sent to overseas executives for Disney.

Series co-creator Dan Povenmire attributed the genesis for the show to his childhood in Mobile, Alabama. Povenmire recalled that his mother told him "never to waste a day of summer". Meanwhile, the show's other co-creator, Jeff "Swampy" Marsh grew up in a large, blended family. Similar to Povenmire, Marsh spent his summers exploring and taking part in several different activities in order to have fun. The two met while working as layout artists on The Simpsons in the 1990s. Povenmire commented that "We were always laughing at the same jokes". The two became a writing team on the Nickelodeon animated series Rocko's Modern Life. They began working on Phineas and Ferb around 1992, while still working together at Nickelodeon. The two had become friends due to their mutual tastes and interests. Citing their childhood, they wanted to incorporate summer vacations, a time when the two would go out and do something constructive. They spent sixteen years pitching it to four different networks, including Nickelodeon and Cartoon Network, all of which kept shooting it down due to its complexity. When Povenmire landed a pitch with Disney, despite being unsure at first, the series was accepted.

Povenmire and Marsh both wrote "Rollercoaster", and used it as the pitch for the entire series. Unlike normal series, they did not send a script to the overseas Disney executives, but set up a storyboard and mixed it over with dialogue by Povenmire, then set up a "play-by-play" and recorded it. The series was accepted after 16 years of development and the episode was produced. Several lines and scenes from the storyboard were removed or altered in the eventual production of the episode. Povenmire and Marsh wanted to include two things in every episode; a song, and an action or chase scene. However, the song in every episode did not begin until "Flop Starz", the next episode. Disney Channel released a press release for the episode on July 14, 2007. The announcement highlighted some of the core plots that remained throughout the series: step-brothers Phineas and Ferb taking their dreams to the extreme by building their inventions, Candace attempting to rat them out to their mom as well as somehow being left with no evidence to bust them, and their pet platypus, Perry, leading a double life as a secret agent and facing off against the evil Dr. Doofenshmirtz.

=== Casting ===
Vincent Martella, Thomas Sangster, and Ashley Tisdale, who voice Phineas, Ferb, and Candace respectively, were all hired by the casting department because of their popularity within the target age-group and general belief in their ability to perform their roles. Another character, Jeremy, who is usually voiced by Mitchel Musso, briefly appeared in the episode in a different voice than usual from an unknown voice extra. The end credits of the episode list several extras who possibly voiced him, including Dee Bradley Baker (who voiced Perry the Platypus), Raviv Ullman, and the creators.

== Release and reception ==
"Rollercoaster" first aired on the Disney Channel on August 17, 2007. It aired as a preview after the premiere of High School Musical 2, with a rating of TV-G. Disney Channel wanted to start off the series in a special way, though they did not use "Rollercoaster"; instead, they chose the episode "Flop Starz", and aired it in a worldwide premiere.

When originally aired on August 17, 2007, "Rollercoaster" peaked high ratings in several demos. The preview garnered a recorded amount of 10.8 million viewers. 4.15 million were in the demographic of kids 6–11, while 4.20 million were in their teens 9–14 category. These high ratings lead to the episode being the second highest-rated telecast Disney Channel received in its recorded history. Povenmire later stated it was one of their favorite episodes. In January 2011, a half-hour musical episode titled "Rollercoaster: The Musical!" was released for the second season, which reenacts the events of "Rollercoaster" in musical form.
