= Jeff "Swampy" Marsh =

American animator and voice actor (born 1960)

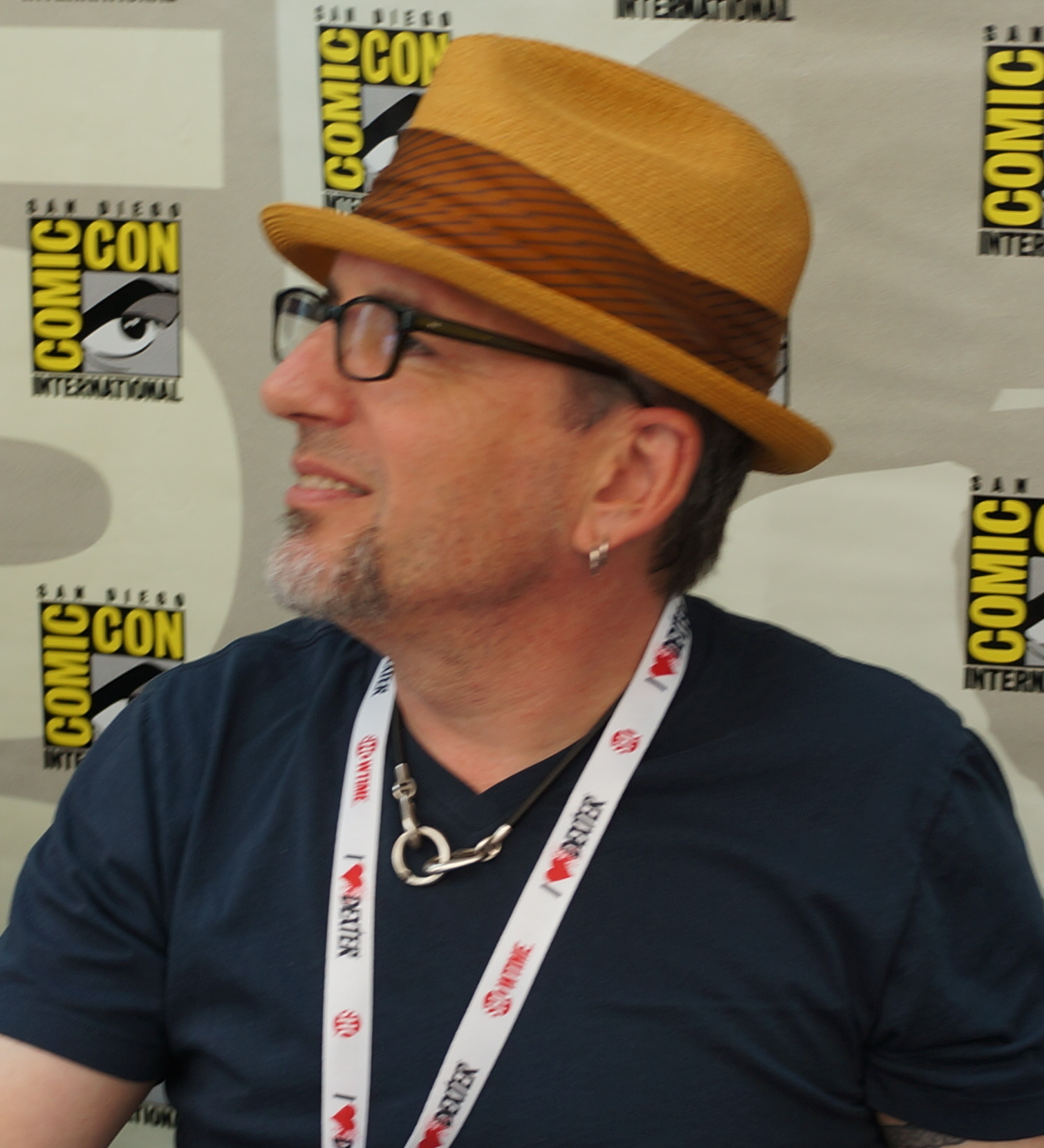
- Marsh in 2013
- Born: Jeffrey Kent Dudman; December 9, 1960 (age 65); Santa Monica, California, U.S.
- Occupations: Animator; writer; producer; director; voice actor
- Employer(s): Disney Television Animation; Nickelodeon Animation Studio; 20th Television Animation; BKN New Media Ltd
- Spouse: Birgitte Bear Verburgt (m. 2006)
- Children: 2
- Relatives: Les Brown (grandfather)
- Writing career
- Years active: 1989–present
- Notable work: Phineas and Ferb; Milo Murphy's Law; King of the Hill; Rocko's Modern Life; The Simpsons; Pete the Cat; Hey A.J.!

Jeffrey Kent "Swampy" Marsh (né Dudman; born December 9, 1960) is an American animator, voice actor, writer, director, and producer. With Dan Povenmire, Marsh is the co-creator and co-star of the Disney Channel animated series Phineas and Ferb and Milo Murphy's Law. Marsh was born in Santa Monica, California, where he grew up with a heavily blended family dynamic. Marsh is known for his contributions to the television animation industry, working for over six seasons on the animated television series The Simpsons. Marsh continued to work on other animated television series, including King of the Hill and Rocko's Modern Life, before moving to England in 1996.

While in England, Marsh worked on several animated programs, including Postman Pat and Bounty Hamster, and worked for BKN New Media Ltd. to produce several feature films. After six years living in England, Marsh was asked by his longtime partner Dan Povenmire to help produce Phineas and Ferb, a concept the two had while working together on Rocko's Modern Life. Marsh accepted and moved back to the United States. Since premiering in 2007, the series has since garnered Marsh two Emmy Awards nominations for songwriting. After Phineas and Ferb, Marsh and Povenmire created and produced Milo Murphy's Law, which premiered in 2016. In 2020, they produced a second Phineas and Ferb film, Candace Against the Universe.

== Early life ==
Born as Jeffrey Kent Dudman on December 9, 1960, in Santa Monica, California, he was raised in a large and complicated blended family, which included his stepfather Bill Marsh (who later adopted Swampy and changed his last name to Marsh). Growing up, he never felt the dynamic was treated in the media coherently enough to make it seem "normal”, which Marsh felt was unjustified since the majority of his friends were from either divorced or blended familial structures.

Marsh spent his summer vacations being active, going outside and digging trenches and tunnels, building tree houses, and constructing forts. He also had a wonderful childhood watching cartoons as a kid. His cartoon heroes were Hanna-Barbera and King Features Syndicate cartoons. He and his family were engrossed in several musical activities, with musical background dating back to Les Brown, Marsh's grandfather. His household was filled with several different musical instruments and over the years, Marsh learned to play the banjo, trombone, trumpet, and guitar. As Marsh recalls, he would "sing into fake microphones and create full rock bands with [his] friends and family."

Throughout high school and college, Marsh took architectural drawing courses and participated in theater productions. He developed an understanding of the view of a set builder.

== Career ==
=== Early career ===
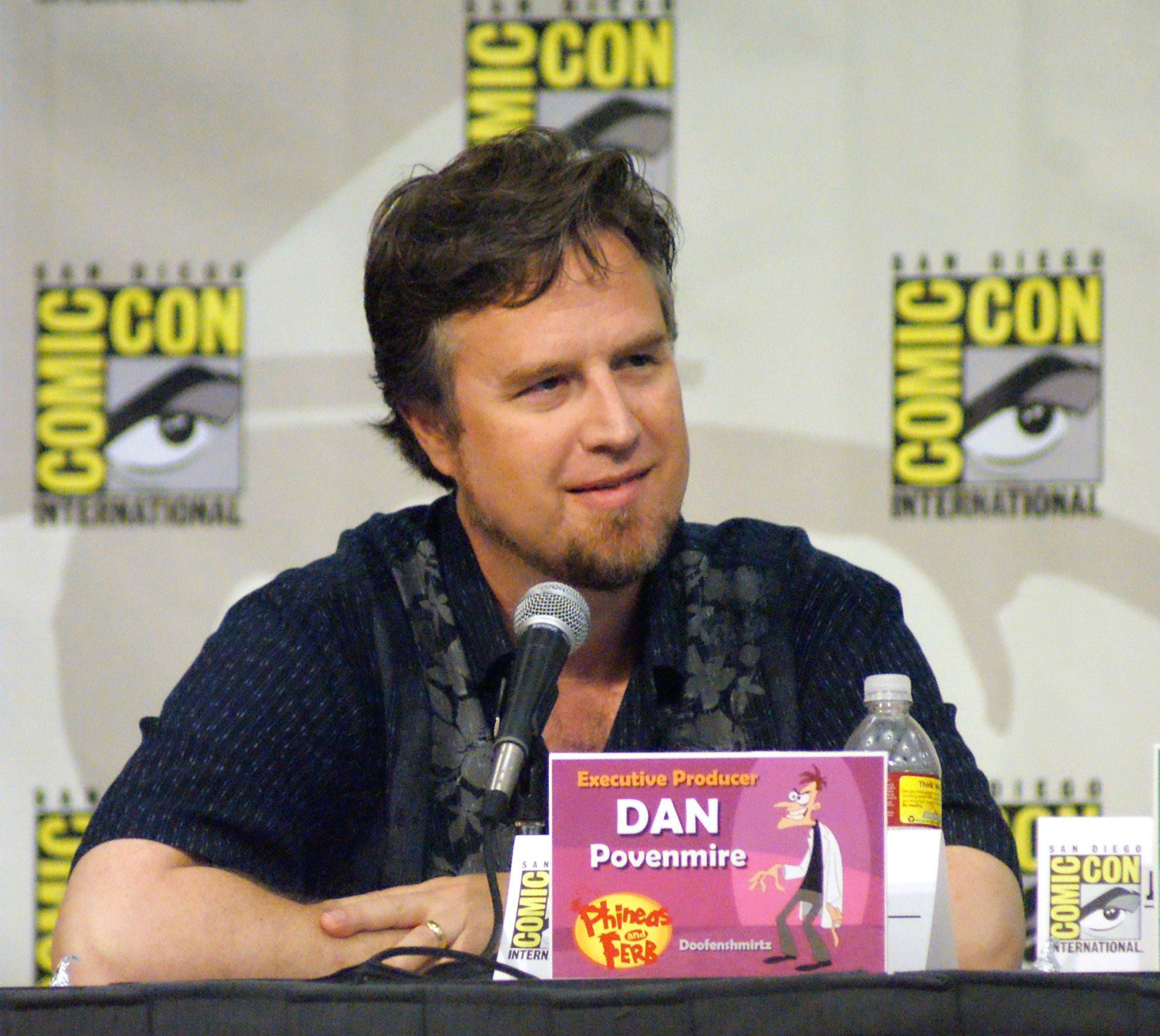
Marsh met Dan Povenmire while working on The Simpsons and continued to work alongside him on Phineas and Ferb.

As an adult, Marsh became a vice president of sales and marketing for a computer company. One day, he "freaked out" and decided to quit. A friend of his helped him put together a portfolio and go into the animation business. He eventually found himself working on the animated television series The Simpsons as a background layout artist in 1990. Marsh worked on the series for over six seasons and three episodes he helped produce won Emmy Awards. To help him with his animation efforts on the show, Marsh utilized several books about art, architecture design, and artistic rendering which he kept in his household library. His desk in the series' office placed him opposite of fellow layout artist Dan Povenmire; the two bonded over shared tastes in humor and music and quickly formed a friendship.

By 1993, Marsh was working as a writer and director on Nickelodeon's animated series Rocko's Modern Life— the channel's first "in house" cartoon production— for four seasons. He found himself working alongside Povenmire again, this time as a writing partner, a choice Marsh claimed was made by the crew in hopes of making Povenmire's neatness offset his own sloppy storyboarding. The pair developed a distinctive style, including in their stories' characteristic musical numbers and chase scenes. Together they won an Environmental Achievement Award for a 1996 Rocko episode they had written.

In 1996, Povenmire and Marsh conceived the series Phineas and Ferb, based on their similar experiences of childhood summers spent outdoors. Povenmire went through several unsuccessful pitches to get the series picked up. In 1997, Marsh was hired as one of the first artists for the Fox Network animated series King of the Hill, serving as both a storyboard artist and designer.

=== Move to England ===
After working on Rocko and King of the Hill, Marsh later moved to London, England around the start of 2000, which he considered to be "absolutely fantastic." Marsh spent six years in the city, working on several animated television productions which included Legend of the Dragon, Postman Pat and Bounty Hamster, along with other projects produced by major companies BBC, ITV, and Carlton TV. He also served as a large contributor and producer for several British feature films, working for BKN International subsidiary BKN New Media Ltd.

Around 2005, Povenmire contacted Marsh, notifying him that a pitch for Phineas and Ferb had been somewhat successful and The Walt Disney Company had shown interest in producing the series but wanted to see an eleven-minute pilot. Marsh immediately accepted and began packing. He had already booked a vacation to Los Angeles, while Povenmire had plans to travel to France; while Povenmire set up a sidetrack to travel to England, Marsh flew down to Los Angeles for two days where he devised a plot outline for the episode "Rollercoaster". When Povenmire went to France, he drew the storyboards and plotted out how it would all come together, and then went to England where the pair touched up the dialogue and checked to make sure it came out how they had planned it.

=== Phineas and Ferb ===
Marsh moved back to the United States when Disney accepted the pilot episode and ordered a full 26-episode season. The pair still needed to convince overseas Disney executives to pick up the series, so instead of a conventional script, they recorded the storyboards for "Rollercoaster". Povenmire then spent time dubbing over it with his voice for each character, along with sound effects and narration. When the recording was sent to the executives, they accepted and the series was officially greenlit for the company's cable network Disney Channel. It officially began broadcast on February 1, 2008, and the cartoon was named Phineas and Ferb.

Marsh and Povenmire wanted to incorporate into the show the kind of humor they had developed in their work on Rocko's Modern Life. They included action sequences and, with Disney's encouragement, featured musical numbers in every episode after "Flop Starz". Povenmire described the songs as his and Marsh's "jab at immortality", but the pair have earned two Emmy nominations for Phineas and Ferb songs to-date. A third Emmy nomination, for the episode "The Monster of Phineas-n-Ferbenstein" (2008), pitted the show against SpongeBob SquarePants, although neither nominee received the award due to an unspecified technicality.

The distinctive style of Tex Avery influenced the show's artistic look, which includes geometric shapes in both the characters and the background. The style was determined by Povenmire's first sketch of title character Phineas Flynn, who he doodled on the butcher paper covering the table during dinner with his family in a restaurant in South Pasadena, California; he was so taken with the sketch he tore it out, kept it, and used it as the prototype for Phineas and the stylistic blueprint for the whole show. In addition to being a co-executive producer and a co-creator, Marsh voices the character of Major Francis Monogram. Marsh based his performance of the character on broadcast journalist and anchorman Walter Cronkite.

=== Career after Phineas and Ferb and reviving the show ===
The final episode of Phineas and Ferb's fourth season aired on June 12, 2015, ending its original run on television. At some point before the North American release of Yo-kai Watch (video game) on November 6, 2015, Marsh and Povenmire, composed, lyricised, and performed the opening song for the Yo-kai Watch series outside of Japan. Marsh and Povenmire collaborated again and produced a series for Disney XD titled Milo Murphy's Law, which premiered on October 3, 2016. Two seasons aired and the last episode premiered on May 18, 2019, with later episodes airing only on Disney Channel. Marsh has also developed an animated TV series for Amazon Prime based on the Pete the Cat children's book series, with the first season premiering in December 2017 and the show running until March 2022. His recent work includes Phineas and Ferb the Movie: Candace Against the Universe, which was released on Disney+ on August 28, 2020. In 2019, Marsh was announced as producer, director and voice director of a queer fantasy web series titled S.A.L.E.M.: The Secret Archive of Legends, Enchantments, and Monsters. Marsh is currently serving as an executive producer on the Disney Junior animated series Hey A.J.!. On March 16, 2023, it was announced that Marsh would be returning as executive producer and voice director for the Phineas and Ferb revival, which premiered on June 5, 2025.

== Personal life ==
Marsh is married to Birgitte Bear Verburgt and has two children and four grandchildren. While attending college in England he was nicknamed "Swampy" in reference to his last name, "Marsh", and he later added it as an inter-title in his credited name: Jeff "Swampy" Marsh. According to an original pitch extra of Phineas and Ferb, Marsh prefers having "Swampy" in his name because it makes his name 15 letters, longer than most other people's names.

== Sources ==
- Greenspon, Jaq (2003). Careers For Film Buffs & Other Hollywood Types. McGraw-Hill. ISBN 978-0-07-140574-4.
- Neuwirth, Allan (2003). Makin' Toons: Inside the Most Popular Animated TV Shows and Movies. Allworth Communications, Inc. ISBN 1-58115-269-8.
