= Phineas Flynn =

Fictional character from Phineas and Ferb

- Phineas and Ferb character
- First appearance: "Rollercoaster" (2007)
- Created by: Dan Povenmire; Jeff "Swampy" Marsh
- Voiced by: Vincent Martella

In-universe information
- Gender: Male
- Occupation: Student
- Family: Unnamed father; Linda Flynn-Fletcher (mother); Candace Flynn (sister); Lawrence Fletcher (stepfather); Ferb Fletcher (stepbrother)
- Spouse: Isabella Garcia-Shapiro (future girlfriend)
- Nationality: American

Phineas Flynn is a fictional character and the titular co-protagonist of the animated television series Phineas and Ferb. He is voiced by Vincent Martella. Phineas, along with his quiet but intelligent stepbrother Ferb Fletcher, stars in the A-Plot of most episodes.

The series concerns Phineas and Ferb's attempts to avoid boredom by finding something new to do for each day of their summer vacation, often with many other neighborhood children. The activities they devise usually involve outlandish contraptions, including roller coasters, haunted houses, roller rinks, and a backyard beach etc. which Phineas and Ferb design and build cooperatively. Phineas's sister is Candace Flynn, who tries to reveal their outrageous creations to their mother, but to no avail.

Phineas comes from a blended family. The creators chose this arrangement because they considered it underused in children's programming as well as from co-creator Jeff "Swampy" Marsh's past experiences in one. As a character, Phineas has received positive critical response, with one reviewer describing him and his stepbrother as a "comical pairing." Phineas appears in Phineas and Ferb merchandise, including plush toys, t-shirts, and a video game.

== Role in Phineas and Ferb ==
Phineas comes from a blended family, a decision co-creator Marsh made to reflect his own experiences growing up. Phineas's birth father is never present or discussed in the series; Marsh and Povenmire have stated that they fully intend to keep that way. It is established that his mother, Linda Flynn-Fletcher, married Ferb's father, Lawrence Fletcher, after dating him for a while in the 1990s. They fell in love at a concert of the fictitious band "Love Händel" after they were put on the kiss cam.

Phineas is portrayed as an intelligent, creative, innovative, and good-natured child. As a means to defeat boredom, he and Ferb devise outrageous activities throughout their summer vacation, often participating in activities such as toy design (in "Toy to the World"); piracy (in "The Ballad of Badbeard"); time travel (in "It's About Time!"); restaurant management (in "Chez Platypus"); all usually inaccessible to children. Phineas lives in the fictional town of Danville (part of the Tri-State Area), in a large, suburban neighborhood; he comes up with most of his ideas while sitting with Ferb in their backyard.

== Concept and creation ==
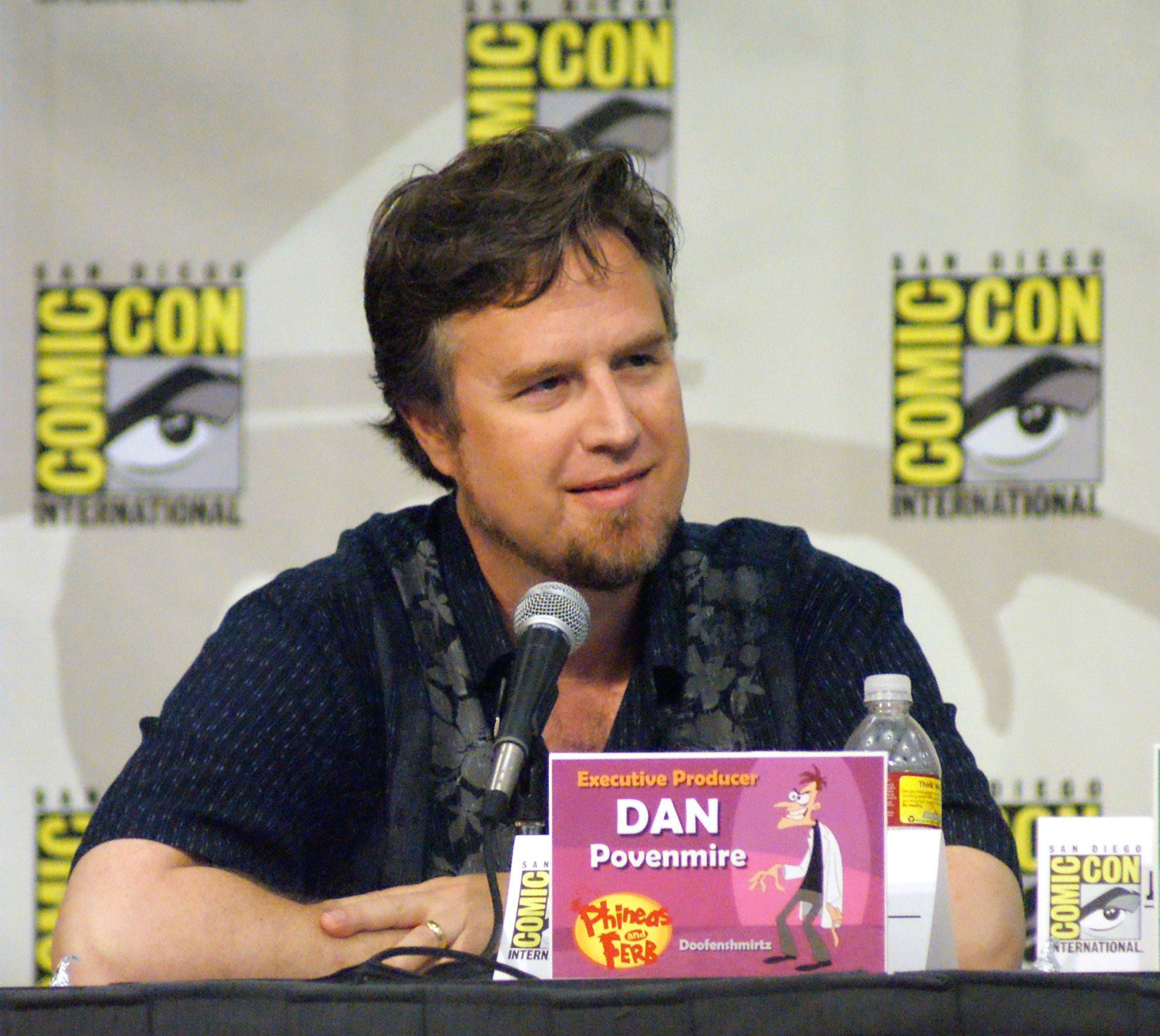
Dan Povenmire originally drew Phineas on a piece of butcher paper in South Pasadena, California.

Dan Povenmire and Jeff "Swampy" Marsh had conceived the idea of the Phineas and Ferb series while working as layout artists on The Simpsons. After planning the basics of the show, the two began laying out characters. Povenmire, eating dinner with his family at a Wild Thyme restaurant in South Pasadena, California, drew a quick sketch of a "triangle kid." Povenmire named the triangle doodle "Phineas," saying he "look[ed] like [one]", and with reference to the character Phileas Fogg (often misreferenced as "Phineas Fogg") from Around the World in 80 Days (1873). Povenmire tore the paper out and called Marsh that night, telling him "Hey, I think we have our show."

After designing the show, the two had significant difficulties getting the series green lit. It was not picked up for fifteen years. In their final pitch to the Walt Disney Company, the creators designed a recorded storyboard, featuring a very rough outline of characters. The prototype Phineas was ruder to others than the version in the eventual show, where the creators decided to make him more good-natured. Citing comedy's "big duos" including Wallace and Gromit and Jay and Silent Bob, the creators chose to give Phineas most of the dialogue while Ferb remains almost silent.

=== Design ===
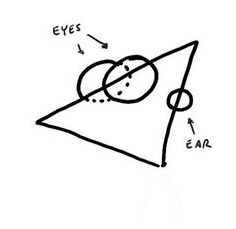
Outline of Phineas' head design.

All characters in Phineas and Ferb were drawn in a design borrowed from Tex Avery's style, with geometric shapes being included in their structure; Phineas in particular is that of a triangle. The triangle face has been stated in the series as being just his nose that covers the entire head. The goal while drawing characters was to make them simple enough to be drawn by child viewers and be recognized by silhouette. Phineas's eyes lie on the top of his head and are of oval shape. For his hair, three "tufts" are put in the back and front, while three freckles lie underneath. For the ear, a small 3 is used to represent the ear lobe. Povenmire uses thin, spindly arms for every character as a simple reason to add fun.

=== Voice ===
Young actor Vincent Martella, previously known for The CW series Everybody Hates Chris, was cast for the role of Phineas. Martella originally auditioned for the role five months before his initial pickup, but was left without feedback for the time. When Dan Povenmire was given a tape of Martella in Everybody Hates Chris, he called him to do Phineas for the pilot. He designed a different voice than his own which he describes as "wacky [and] crazy." The creators were afraid of him losing it when his voice changed, though he was still able to retain it for the most part even afterward, though the tone is now slightly different from the original sound.

While in recording sessions, Martella has a large amount of enthusiasm and describes it as humorous to watch himself doing a take. In interviews Martella has said that he enjoys working on the series and voicing Phineas, and appreciates the opportunity to work alongside guest stars, especially Malcolm McDowell.

Martella once wrote as an article for Popstar! Magazine his thoughts on the role and of the show itself:

The greatest thing about being on Phineas so far is that I can get my parents to laugh! We all sat down to see the beach episode on New Years Eve! Once I saw all the adults laughing along with me and my 10-year-old brother, that was the greatest thing in the world to me!

— Martella

=== Hallmarks ===
Phineas and Ferb makes liberal use of running gags, and Phineas has several recurrent lines that are featured in most episodes. When he comes up with an idea of what adventure he and his brother are going to have that day, he says "Ferb, I know what we're gonna do today!" During the course of an adventure, Phineas is generally asked by a disbelieving adult "Aren't you a little bit young to be..." doing whatever he's doing in that episode. For example, while constructing a shrine of his sister on the face of Mount Rushmore, a park ranger asks him "Aren't you boys a little young to be restoring a national monument?" Phineas generally answers "Yes, yes we are," though on a few occasions has responded "No" or "Well, I don't think so."

In every episode, Phineas and Ferb's pet platypus, Perry, disappears to carry out his job as a secret agent. The kids almost always notice this, asking "Hey, where's Perry?" Then, when Perry comes home, they say, "Oh, there you are, Perry." Discussing Perry, co-creator Povenmire cited the example of his own pet cat, Sprocket, which he claimed led a "secret life" with his neighbors in order to get extra food.

== Characterization ==
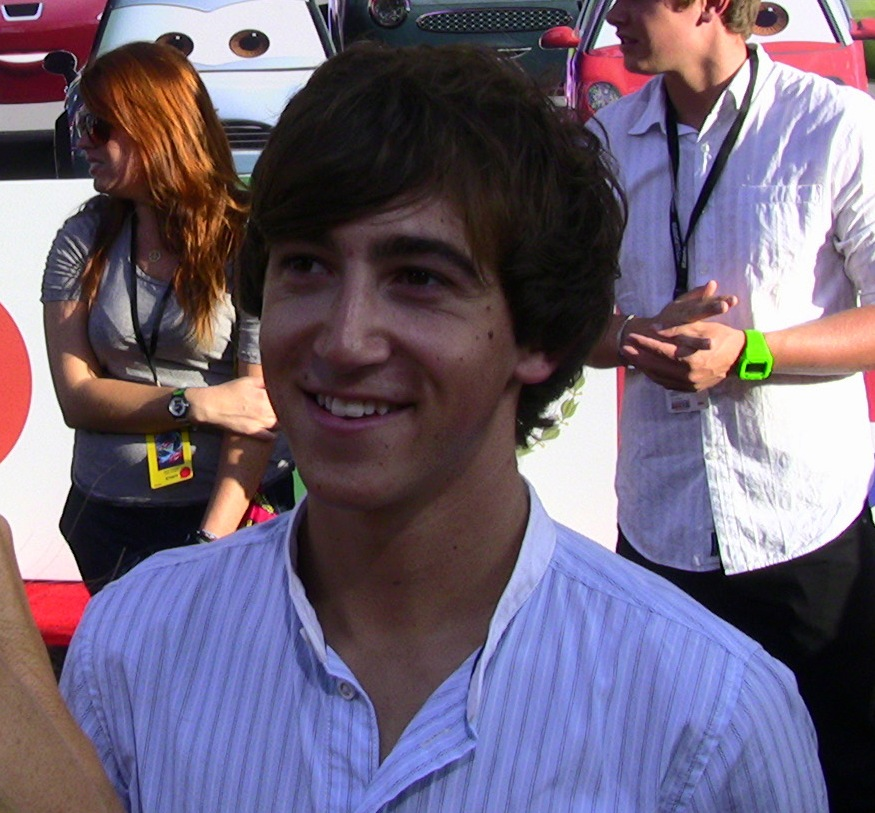
Vincent Martella voices Phineas Flynn.

His [Phineas'] confidence makes people think, "He must be a prodigy." People rarely ask him if he's too young. He'd never lie to an adult or try to get away with anything. He's just motivated by fun. If he thought mom would actually dislike the things they're doing, he would probably stop, but since he's never gotten in trouble for it, he doesn't think of it as getting into trouble.

— Dan Povenmire in an interview with Animation Magazine.

Phineas is portrayed as being a highly intelligent, imaginative, optimistic, and adventurous boy. The Disney Channel promos for Phineas and Ferb describe him as someone who "thinks big", refusing to let any day be ordinary. Povenmire also characterizes him as assertive, someone so secure in his abilities that others assume he is a prodigy. Povenmire and Marsh wanted the series to reflect their own childhood memories of going out during the summer and have fun, digging trenches and building tunnels, forts, and tree houses.

The creators wanted Phineas, like Ferb, to be a character who would never "[do] anything with any animosity," or to agitate his sister or outsmart his mother purposely. Instead, the character was supposed to be motivated only by enjoyment and free from mean spiritedness. He is very friendly, caring, well-mannered, and several of his plots involve helping someone out. He tries to please his sister Candace, carving her face into Mount Rushmore for her birthday in one episode and helping her retrieve a tape detailing his summer adventures even though she intended on using the footage as evidence to "bust" him and Ferb. Another episode has him throwing an extravaganza for his mother's birthday, and yet another has him (along with Ferb and Candace) recreating their parents' most romantic moment for their wedding anniversary. He has also been shown helping his grandparents, reenacting his step-grandfather Reginald's daredevil stunt from his youth and setting up a roller derby for a rematch race with his grandmother Betty Jo's old rival. In the episodes "One Good Scare Ought to Do It!" and "Hail Doofania!", Phineas goes to great lengths to help his friend Isabella. Other episodes, like "Unfair Science Fair," "Oil on Candace," "The Bully Code," and "Voyage To The Bottom of Buford," further explore Phineas's generosity toward all of his friends.

Occasionally, Phineas's ideas, plots, and schemes have upset others, intentionally or otherwise. Most notably Candace is constantly frustrated in her efforts to "bust" her brothers throughout the series, and in rare cases, Phineas has unwittingly caused misfortune to others. For example, in the episode "Get That Bigfoot Outta My Face," Phineas gives all the kids at camp a fright when he tricks them into thinking Bigfoot is attacking, though this is mostly getting into the spirit of spooky story telling.

Nonetheless, Povenmire and Marsh intended for Phineas and Ferb to be motivated only by fun. In one episode, "Thaddeus and Thor", Phineas says that fun is his only goal in his daily schemes – though Ferb adds that they also do it "for the ladies." Phineas also says that he wants his adventures to give him something interesting to say when he gets back to school, a setting the creators have confirmed they will never put him in.

== Reception ==
Phineas has received mostly positive reviews. Emily Ashby of Common Sense Media describes Phineas as "boisterous," and he and Ferb as "partner[s] in crime." Susan Stewart, reviewing the show in The New York Times, notes that Phineas and Ferb "work on a heroic scale and are apparently not limited by the laws of nature." Jean Yoo, an official press member for Disney Channel, describes him as "a precocious bundle of energy whose tolerance for sitting still is just a little thinner than his patience for the social echelon in which he finds himself." She as well notes that he is "endearing and smart."

Variety calls Phineas's adventures "spectacular." Animation Insider reporter Aaron Bynum described him as a "wiz kid idea machine." The Seattle Times wrote that both Phineas and Ferb were "young heroes." The song "Ain't Got Rhythm," which Vincent Martella performed in the voice of Phineas alongside Steve Zahn and Thomas Sangster in the episode "Dude, We're Getting the Band Back Together," was nominated for an Emmy Award in 2008 for "Outstanding Original Music and Lyrics."

== Legacy ==
Besides the series Phineas and Ferb, Phineas has been featured in several other pieces of merchandise from the series. To date, he has appeared in all Phineas and Ferb novelizations, published by Disney Press. Phineas appears in the Nintendo DS video game based on the series, simply titled Phineas and Ferb. Dan Povenmire has said that he saw nothing of the game until its release, on which he was given a copy for free. Paste claimed that Phineas, alongside Ferb are 33rd best cartoon characters of all time.

Plush toys of the character, along with toys representing Ferb and Perry, have been manufactured. Phineas also appears on most of the Phineas and Ferb t-shirts. Phineas is set to appear in the forthcoming comic book series based on the series, though details are unconfirmed. Phineas and his brother Ferb have as well both been referenced in the book Lost and Found: How Churches Are Connecting to Young Adults as examples of how media and television characters can be influential in people's lives.
