= List of Phineas and Ferb episodes =

Episodes of American television series

Phineas and Ferb is an American animated musical-comedy television series created by Dan Povenmire and Jeff "Swampy" Marsh for Disney Channel and Disney XD. The series follows Phineas Flynn and his stepbrother Ferb Fletcher during summer vacation. Every day, the boys embark on a grand new project, which annoys their controlling older sister, Candace, who frequently tries to reveal their shenanigans to her and Phineas' mother, Linda Flynn-Fletcher. The series also follows the titular stepbrothers' pet platypus Perry, a secret agent whose sole mission is to prevent his evil arch-nemesis Dr. Heinz Doofenshmirtz from taking over the tri-state area.

Phineas and Ferb was conceived by Povenmire and Marsh while working together on The Simpsons and Rocko's Modern Life in the 1990s. Povenmire and Marsh pitched the concept to networks like Nickelodeon and Cartoon Network, but they passed on the show. Povenmire later pitched the idea to Disney Television Animation. Disney executives initially declined the pitch, but told Povenmire that they would "keep the packet". Povenmire assumed that this meant an end to negotiations, aware that the phrase usually means they "throw it in the trash later". Disney later surprised Povenmire by agreeing to produce the show.

Two episodes, "Rollercoaster", and "Lawn Gnome Beach Party of Terror", were previewed on August 17 and September 28, 2007, respectively. The first season officially began airing on February 1, 2008, and aired through February 18, 2009, consisting of 26 episodes. Ratings for the season were high, with "Rollercoaster" garnering 10.80 million viewers. The second season premiered the following day after season 1 finished on February 19, 2009, running until February 11, 2011. Phineas and Ferb continued to air regularly until its fourth and originally final season, which began on December 7, 2012, and ended on June 12, 2015. On January 13, 2023, Disney Branded Television announced at the Television Critics Association press tour that the series would be revived, with season five and six comprising 40 episodes. The first season of the revival premiered on Disney Channel on June 5, 2025, and on Disney+ the following day, June 6, 2025.

== Series overview ==
Season	Segments	Episodes	Originally released	
Season	Segments	Episodes	First released	Last released
1	47	26	August 17, 2007	February 18, 2009
2	65	39	February 19, 2009	February 11, 2011
3	62	35	March 4, 2011	November 30, 2012
4	49	37	December 7, 2012	June 12, 2015
5	38	20	June 5, 2025	January 16, 2026
6	TBA	20	October 6, 2026	TBA

== Episodes ==
Most of the episodes premiered in pairs of two eleven-minute stories, while others were released on their own. To match up with the current digital releases and reruns, the episodes are listed under the original production order for the first four seasons, the order mainly used for streaming services.

=== Season 1 (2007–09) ===
No. overall	No. in season	Title	Directed by	Written by	Storyboarded by	Original release date	Prod. code	U.S. viewers (millions)
1	1	"Rollercoaster"	Dan Povenmire	Dan Povenmire & Jeff "Swampy" Marsh	Dan Povenmire (uncredited)	August 17, 2007	101	10.80
1	1	"Candace Loses Her Head"	Dan Povenmire	Story by : Dan Povenmire, Jeff "Swampy" Marsh & Martin Olson; Teleplay by : Dan Povenmire, Jeff "Swampy" Marsh, Martin Olson, Kyle Baker & Patrick A. Ventura	Kyle Baker & Patrick A. Ventura	February 5, 2008	101	N/A
2	2	"The Fast and the Phineas"	Dan Povenmire	Story by : Dan Povenmire & Jeff "Swampy" Marsh; Teleplay by : Dan Povenmire, Jeff "Swampy" Marsh, Sherm Cohen & Antoine Guilbaud	Sherm Cohen & Antoine Guilbaud	February 2, 2008	102	N/A
2	2	"Lawn Gnome Beach Party of Terror"	Dan Povenmire	Story by : Dan Povenmire, Jeff "Swampy" Marsh, Martin Olson & Bobby Gaylor; Teleplay by : Dan Povenmire, Jeff "Swampy" Marsh, Martin Olson, Bobby Gaylor, Chris Headrick & Jon Colton Barry	Chris Headrick & Jon Colton Barry	September 28, 2007	102	3.3
3	3	"The Magnificent Few"	Dan Povenmire	Story by : Martin Olson, Dan Povenmire & Swampy Marsh; Teleplay by : Martin Olson, Dan Povenmire, Swampy Marsh, Mike Diederich & Chong Lee	Mike Diederich & Chong Lee	February 8, 2008	103	1.61 (Note: with kids 6-11)
3	3	"S'Winter"	Dan Povenmire	Story by : Dan Povenmire, Swampy Marsh, Martin Olson & Bobby Gaylor; Written by : Dan Povenmire, Swampy Marsh, Martin Olson, Bobby Gaylor, Sherm Cohen & Antoine Guilbaud	Antoine Guilbaud & Sherm Cohen	February 9, 2008	103	N/A
4	4	"Are You My Mummy?"	Dan Povenmire	Story by : Dan Povenmire, Swampy Marsh, Martin Olson & Bobby Gaylor; Written by : Dan Povenmire, Swampy Marsh, Martin Olson, Bobby Gaylor, Robert F. Hughes, Kyle Baker & Mike Roth	Kyle Baker & Mike Roth	February 15, 2008	104	N/A
4	4	"Flop Starz"	Dan Povenmire	Story by : Dan Povenmire & Jeff "Swampy" Marsh; Teleplay by : Dan Povenmire, Jeff "Swampy" Marsh, Sherm Cohen & Antoine Guilbaud	Sherm Cohen & Antoine Guilbaud	February 1, 2008	104	3.99
5	5	"Raging Bully"	Dan Povenmire	Story by : Martin Olson, Dan Povenmire & Jeff "Swampy" Marsh; Teleplay by : Martin Olson, Dan Povenmire, Jeff "Swampy" Marsh, Wendy Grieb & Kent Osborne	Wendy Grieb & Kent Osborne	February 4, 2008	105	1.46
5	5	"Lights, Candace, Action!"	Dan Povenmire	Story by : Dan Povenmire, Jeff "Swampy" Marsh, Martin Olson & Bobby Gaylor; Written by : Dan Povenmire, Jeff "Swampy" Marsh, Martin Olson, Bobby Gaylor, Sherm Cohen & Antoine Guilbaud	Sherm Cohen & Antoine Guilbaud	February 3, 2008	105	N/A
6	6	"Get That Bigfoot Outa My Face!"	Dan Povenmire	Story by : Dan Povenmire & Bobby Gaylor; Written by : Dan Povenmire, Bobby Gaylor, Kent Osborne & Kim Roberson	Kent Osborne & Kim Roberson	February 23, 2008	106	N/A
6	6	"Tree to Get Ready"	Dan Povenmire	Story by : Martin Olson, Dan Povenmire & Swampy Marsh; Written by : Mike Diederich, Chong Lee, Martin Olson, Dan Povenmire & Swampy Marsh	Mike Diederich & Chong Lee	March 22, 2008	106	N/A
7	7	"It's About Time!" (Note: This episode is a half-hour special.)	Dan Povenmire	Story by : Dan Povenmire; Written by : Dan Povenmire, Jon Colton Barry, Kent Osborne, Mike Roth & Aliki Theofilopoulos	Jon Colton Barry, Mike Roth, Kent Osborne & Aliki Theofilopoulos	March 1, 2008	107	N/A
8	8	"Jerk De Soleil"	Dan Povenmire	Story by : Bobby Gaylor & Martin Olson; Written by : Bobby Gaylor, Martin Olson, J.G. Quintel & Kim Roberson	J.G. Quintel & Kim Roberson	February 10, 2008	108	N/A
8	8	"Toy to the World"	Jeff "Swampy" Marsh	Story by : Bobby Gaylor & Martin Olson; Written by : Mike Diederich, Bobby Gaylor, Chong Lee & Martin Olson	Mike Diederich & Chong Lee	February 22, 2008	108	1.63
9	9	"One Good Scare Ought to Do It!"	Dan Povenmire & Zac Moncrief	Story by : Bobby Gaylor & Martin Olson; Written by : Jon Colton Barry, Bobby Gaylor, Chris Headrick & Martin Olson	Jon Colton Barry & Chris Headrick	October 3, 2008 (Note: This episode was first released on The Fast and the Phineas DVD on July 29, 2008.)	109	N/A
10	10	"A Hard Day's Knight"	Dan Povenmire	sBobby Gaylor & Martin Olson; Written by : Jon Colton Barry, Bobby Gaylor, Martin Olson & Mike Roth	Jon Colton Barry & Mike Roth	June 14, 2008	110	N/A
10	10	"I, Brobot"	Dan Povenmire	Story by : Martin Olson; Teleplay by : Martin Olson, Kent Osborne & Aliki Theofilopoulos	Kent Osborne & Aliki Theofilopoulos	February 6, 2008	110	N/A
11	11	"Mom's Birthday"	Dan Povenmire	Story by : Swampy Marsh, Martin Olson & Dan Povenmire; Written by : Robert F. Hughes, Zac Moncrief, Martin Olson, Kent Osborne & Aliki Theofilopoulos	Kent Osborne & Aliki Theofilopoulos	February 29, 2008	111	3.4
11	11	"Journey to the Center of Candace"	Dan Povenmire	Story by : Bobby Gaylor & Martin Olson; Written by : Bobby Gaylor, Robert F. Hughes, Zac Moncrief, Martin Olson, Kent Osborne & Kim Roberson	Kim Roberson & Kent Osborne	February 29, 2008	111	3.4
12	12	"Run Away Runway"	Dan Povenmire	Story by : Bobby Gaylor & Martin Olson; Teleplay by : Sherm Cohen, Bobby Gaylor, Antoine Guilbaud & Martin Olson	Sherm Cohen & Antoine Guilbaud	February 7, 2008	112	1.53
12	12	"I Scream, You Scream"	Zac Moncrief	Story by : Bobby Gaylor; Written by : Sherm Cohen, Bobby Gaylor & Antoine Guilbaud	Sherm Cohen & Antoine Guilbaud	February 17, 2008	112	N/A
13	13	"It's a Mud, Mud, Mud, Mud World"	Zac Moncrief	Story by : Bobby Gaylor & Martin Olson; Written by : Mike Diederich, Bobby Gaylor, Robert F. Hughes, Zac Moncrief, Martin Olson & Mike Roth	Mike Diederich & Mike Roth	February 24, 2008	113	N/A
13	13	"The Ballad of Badbeard"	Dan Povenmire	Story by : Bobby Gaylor & Martin Olson; Written by : Jon Colton Barry, Mike Diederich, Bobby Gaylor, Robert F. Hughes, Zac Moncrief & Martin Olson	Mike Diederich & Jon Colton Barry	April 12, 2008	113	N/A
14	14	"Dude, We're Getting the Band Back Together"	Dan Povenmire	Story by : Bobby Gaylor & Martin Olson; Written by : Bobby Gaylor, Chris Headrick, Robert F. Hughes, Chong Lee, Zac Moncrief & Martin Olson	Chris Headrick & Chong Lee	March 8, 2008	114	N/A
15	15	"Ready for the Bettys"	Zac Moncrief	Story by : Bobby Gaylor & Martin Olson; Written by : Bobby Gaylor, Martin Olson, Kent Osborne & Aliki Theofilopoulos	Aliki Theofilopoulos & Kent Osborne	February 16, 2008	115	N/A
15	15	"The Flying Fishmonger"	Zac Moncrief	Story by : Bobby Gaylor & Martin Olson; Written by : Bobby Gaylor, Elizabeth Ito, Martin Olson, Kim Roberson	Kim Roberson & Elizabeth Ito	September 12, 2008	115	N/A
16	16	"Phineas and Ferb Get Busted!"	Dan Povenmire	Story by : Bobby Gaylor & Martin Olson; Written by : Jon Colton Barry, Bobby Gaylor, Robert F. Hughes, Zac Moncrief, Martin Olson & Piero Piluso	Jon Colton Barry & Piero Piluso	February 16, 2009 (Note: Beginning with this episode, new episodes premiered on Disney XD prior to Disney Channel.)	116	N/A
17	17	"Greece Lightning"	Dan Povenmire	Story by : Bobby Gaylor & Martin Olson; Written by : Alex Almaguer, Bobby Gaylor, Chris Headrick & Martin Olson	Alex Almaguer & Chris Headrick	April 19, 2008	117	N/A
17	17	"Leave the Busting to Us!"	Zac Moncrief	Story by : Bobby Gaylor & Martin Olson; Written by : Sherm Cohen, Bobby Gaylor, Antoine Guilbaud, Robert F. Hughes & Martin Olson	Sherm Cohen & Antoine Guilbaud	April 19, 2008	117	N/A
18	18	"Crack That Whip"	Dan Povenmire	Story by : Bobby Gaylor & Martin Olson; Written by : Timothy Björklund & Kim Roberson	Timothy Björklund & Kim Roberson	May 24, 2008	118	N/A
18	18	"The Best Lazy Day Ever"	Zac Moncrief	Story by : Bobby Gaylor & Martin Olson; Written by : Jon Colton Barry & Mike Roth	Jon Colton Barry & Mike Roth	May 24, 2008	118	N/A
19	19	"Boyfriend from 27,000 B.C."	Zac Moncrief	Story by : Martin Olson; Written by : Aliki Theofilopoulos & Marc Crisafulli	Aliki Theofilopoulos & Marc Crisafulli	June 7, 2008	119	N/A
19	19	"Voyage to the Bottom of Buford"	Zac Moncrief	Story by : Bobby Gaylor & Martin Olson; Written by : Antoine Guilbaud & Chong Lee	Antoine Guilbaud & Chong Lee	June 7, 2008	119	N/A
20	20	"Put That Putter Away"	Zac Moncrief	order-s,w Written by : Jon Colton Barry & Mike Diederich; Story by : Bobby Gaylor & Martin Olson	Jon Colton Barry & Mike Diederich	August 10, 2008	120	1.53
20	20	"Does This Duckbill Make Me Look Fat?"	Dan Povenmire	Story by : Bobby Gaylor & Martin Olson; Written by : Douglas McCarthy & Piero Piluso	Douglas McCarthy & Piero Piluso	August 10, 2008	120	1.53
21	21	"Traffic Cam Caper"	Dan Povenmire & Zac Moncrief	Story by : Martin Olson; Written by : Kim Roberson & Marc Ceccarelli	Kim Roberson & Marc Ceccarelli	July 12, 2008	121	N/A
21	21	"Bowl-R-Ama Drama"	Dan Povenmire	Story by : Bobby Gaylor & Martin Olson; Written by : Chris Headrick & Alex Almaguer	Chris Headrick & Alex Almaguer	July 12, 2008	121	N/A
22	22	"The Monster of Phineas-n-Ferbenstein"	Zac Moncrief	Story by : Jon Colton Barry & Martin Olson; Written by : Jon Colton Barry & Mike Diederich	Jon Colton Barry & Mike Diederich	October 17, 2008	122	1.26 (Note: with kids 9-14)
22	22	"Oil on Candace"	Zac Moncrief	Story by : Bobby Gaylor & Martin Olson; Written by : Antoine Guilbaud & Aliki Theofilopoulos	Antoine Guilbaud & Aliki Theofilopoulos	October 17, 2008	122	1.26
23	23	"Unfair Science Fair"	Dan Povenmire & Zac Moncrief	Story by : Bobby Gaylor & Martin Olson; Written by : Elizabeth Ito & Aliki Theofilopoulos	Elizabeth Ito & Aliki Theofilopoulos	February 17, 2009 (Note: This episode was first released on The Daze of Summer DVD on February 10, 2009.)	123	N/A
23	23	"Unfair Science Fair Redux (Another Story)"	Dan Povenmire & Zac Moncrief	Story by : Bobby Gaylor & Martin Olson; Written by : Jon Colton Barry & Piero Piluso	Jon Colton Barry & Piero Piluso	February 18, 2009	123	N/A
24	24	"Out to Launch"	Dan Povenmire & Zac Moncrief	Story by : Bobby Gaylor & Martin Olson; Written by : Kim Roberson, Piero Piluso & Kent Osborne	Kim Roberson, Piero Piluso & Kent Osborne	December 5, 2008	124	N/A
25	25	"Got Game?"	Zac Moncrief	Story by : Jon Colton Barry, Bobby Gaylor, Lance LeCompte & Martin Olson; Written by : Antoine Guilbaud & Chong Lee	Antoine Guilbaud & Chong Lee	August 2, 2008	125	N/A
25	25	"Comet Kermillian"	Dan Povenmire	Story by : Martin Olson & Bobby Gaylor; Written by : Alex Almaguer & Chris Headrick	Alex Almaguer & Chris Headrick	August 2, 2008	125	N/A
26	26	"Out of Toon"	Zac Moncrief	Story by : Bobby Gaylor & Martin Olson; Written by : Jon Colton Barry & Mike Diederich	Jon Colton Barry & Mike Diederich	November 7, 2008	126	N/A
26	26	"Hail Doofania!"	Zac Moncrief	Story by : Bobby Gaylor & Martin Olson; Written by : Antoine Guilbaud & Aliki Theofilopoulos	Antoine Guilbaud & Aliki Theofilopoulos	November 7, 2008	126	N/A

=== Season 2 (2009–11) ===
No. overall	No. in season	Title	Directed by	Written and storyboarded by	Story by	Original release date	Prod. code	U.S. viewers (millions)
27	1	"The Lake Nose Monster"	Robert F. Hughes	Jon Colton Barry & Piero Piluso	Richard Goodman	February 19, 2009	201	N/A
28	2	"Interview With a Platypus"	Zac Moncrief	Antoine Guilbaud & Kim Roberson	Jon Colton Barry	February 20, 2009	202	N/A
28	2	"Tip of the Day"	Robert F. Hughes	Jon Colton Barry & Piero Piluso	David Shane	January 23, 2009 (Note: This episode premiered as a sneak peek on Toon Disney. It officially premiered on Disney XD on February 20, 2009.)	202	N/A
29	3	"Attack of the 50 Foot Sister"	Zac Moncrief	Jon Colton Barry & Piero Piluso	Bill Motz & Bob Roth	February 21, 2009	203	N/A
29	3	"Backyard Aquarium"	Robert F. Hughes	Joe Orrantia & Mike Roth	Jen Kirkman	February 21, 2009	203	N/A
30	4	"Day of the Living Gelatin"	Zac Moncrief	Mike Roth & Joe Orrantia	Michael Ryan	February 28, 2009	204	N/A
30	4	"Elementary My Dear Stacy"	Zac Moncrief	Antoine Guilbaud & Kim Roberson	Jon Colton Barry	February 28, 2009	204	N/A
31	5	"Don't Even Blink"	Robert F. Hughes	Antoine Guilbaud & Kim Roberson	Bobby Gaylor & Dan Povenmire	April 4, 2009	205	N/A
31	5	"Chez Platypus"	Zac Moncrief	Antoine Guilbaud & Kim Roberson	Jen Kirkman & Jon Colton Barry	April 4, 2009	205	N/A
32	6	"Perry Lays an Egg"	Zac Moncrief	Joe Orrantia & Mike Roth	Michael Ryan	April 11, 2009	206	N/A
32	6	"Gaming the System"	Zac Moncrief	Joe Orrantia & Zac Moncrief	Bill Motz & Bob Roth	April 11, 2009	206	N/A
33	7	"The Chronicles of Meap"	Jeff "Swampy" Marsh & Robert F. Hughes	Jon Colton Barry & Piero Piluso	Jon Colton Barry & David Shane	April 18, 2009	207	N/A
34	8	"Thaddeus and Thor"	Zac Moncrief	Antoine Guilbaud & Kim Roberson	Devin Bunje & Nick Stanton	June 15, 2009	208	N/A
34	8	"De Plane! De Plane!"	Zac Moncrief	Joe Orrantia & Mike Roth	David Teitelbaum	June 15, 2009	208	N/A
35	9	"Let's Take a Quiz"	Zac Moncrief	Joe Orrantia & Mike Roth	Devin Bunje & Nick Stanton	June 22, 2009	209	N/A
35	9	"At the Car Wash"	Robert F. Hughes	Michael Diederich & Perry Zombolas	May Chan	June 22, 2009	209	N/A
36	10	"Oh, There You Are, Perry"	Robert F. Hughes	Aliki Theofilopoulos Grafft & Antoine Guilbaud	Jon Colton Barry	July 11, 2009	210	N/A
36	10	"Swiss Family Phineas"	Zac Moncrief	Sherm Cohen & Chong Lee	Scott Peterson	July 11, 2009	210	N/A
37	11	"Phineas and Ferb's Musical Cliptastic Countdown"	Dan Povenmire	Written by : Scott Peterson	Jon Colton Barry	October 12, 2009	211	N/A
38	12	"Phineas and Ferb's Quantum Boogaloo"	Zac Moncrief	Kaz & Kim Roberson	Scott Peterson	September 21, 2009	212	3.90
39	13	"Hide and Seek"	Zac Moncrief	Kaz & Kim Roberson	Jon Colton Barry	July 18, 2009	213	N/A
39	13	"That Sinking Feeling"	Robert F. Hughes	Aliki Theofilopoulos Grafft & Antoine Guilbaud	May Chan	July 18, 2009	213	N/A
40	14	"The Baljeatles"	Robert F. Hughes	Piero Piluso & Jon Colton Barry	Jon Colton Barry	July 25, 2009	214	N/A
40	14	"Vanessassary Roughness"	Robert F. Hughes	Michael Diederich & Perry Zombolas	Scott Peterson	July 25, 2009	214	N/A
41	15	"No More Bunny Business"	Zac Moncrief	Sherm Cohen & Chong Lee	Jon Colton Barry	August 1, 2009	215	N/A
41	15	"Spa Day"	Robert F. Hughes	Aliki Theofilopoulos Grafft & Antoine Guilbaud	Jennifer Keene	August 1, 2009	215	N/A
42	16	"Bubble Boys"	Zac Moncrief	J. G. Orrantia & Mike Roth	May Chan	October 17, 2009	216	N/A
42	16	"Isabella and the Temple of Sap"	Zac Moncrief	J. G. Orrantia & Mike Roth	May Chan	October 17, 2009	216	N/A
43	17	"Cheer Up Candace"	Robert F. Hughes	Michael Diederich & Perry Zombolas	May Chan	October 24, 2009	217	N/A
43	17	"Fireside Girl Jamboree"	Zac Moncrief	Sherm Cohen & Chong Lee	Jennifer Keene	October 24, 2009	217	N/A
44	18	"The Bully Code"	Zac Moncrief	Kim Roberson & Kaz	Martin Olson	October 31, 2009	218	N/A
44	18	"Finding Mary McGuffin"	Robert F. Hughes & Jay Lender	Aliki Theofilopoulos Grafft & Antoine Guilbaud	Jennifer Keene	October 31, 2009	218	N/A
45	19	"What Do It Do?"	Robert F. Hughes & Jay Lender	Jon Colton Barry & Piero Piluso	Martin Olson	November 14, 2009	219	N/A
45	19	"Atlantis"	Zac Moncrief	Kim Roberson & Kaz	Jennifer Keene	November 14, 2009	219	N/A
46	20	"Picture This"	Robert F. Hughes & Jay Lender	Michael Diederich & Kaz	Martin Olson	November 7, 2009	220	N/A
46	20	"Nerdy Dancin'"	Zac Moncrief	J. G. Orrantia & Perry Zombolas	May Chan	November 7, 2009	220	N/A
47	21	"I Was a Middle Aged Robot"	Zac Moncrief	Sherm Cohen & Chong Lee	Martin Olson	February 13, 2010	221	N/A
47	21	"Suddenly Suzy"	Jay Lender & Robert F. Hughes	Aliki Theofilopoulos Grafft & Antoine Guilbaud	Martin Olson & May Chan	February 13, 2010	221	N/A
48	22	"Phineas and Ferb Christmas Vacation!" (Note: This episode is a 45-minute special.)	Zac Moncrief	Jon Colton Barry & Piero Piluso	Jon Colton Barry & Scott Peterson	December 6, 2009	222	N/A
49	23	"Undercover Carl"	Zac Moncrief	Chong Suk Lee & Sherm Cohen	May Chan & Martin Olson	February 13, 2010	223	N/A
49	23	"Hip Hip Parade"	Zac Moncrief & Robert F. Hughes	J. G. Orrantia & Perry Zombolas	May Chan	February 13, 2010	223	N/A
50	24	"Just Passing Through"	Zac Moncrief	Edgar Karapetyan & Kim Roberson	Martin Olson	February 6, 2010	224	N/A
50	24	"Candace's Big Day"	Robert F. Hughes & Jay Lender	Aliki Theofilopoulos Grafft & Antoine Guilbaud	Jennifer Keene	February 6, 2010	224	N/A
51	25	"Invasion of the Ferb Snatchers"	Zac Moncrief	J. G. Orrantia & Perry Zombolas	Jennifer Keene & Martin Olson	February 20, 2010	225	N/A
51	25	"Ain't No Kiddie Ride"	Zac Moncrief	Sherm Cohen & Chong Suk Lee	Jennifer Keene & Martin Olson	February 20, 2010	225	N/A
52	26	"Wizard of Odd"	Jay Lender & Robert F. Hughes	Michael Diederich & Kaz	Scott Peterson	September 24, 2010 (Note: Beginning with this episode, new episodes premiered on Disney Channel prior to Disney XD.)	226	3.07
53	27	"The Beak"	Jeff "Swampy" Marsh & Jay Lender	Jon Colton Barry & Piero Piluso	Scott Peterson	March 8, 2010	227	N/A
54	28	"Not Phineas and Ferb"	Zac Moncrief	Kim Roberson & Kaz	Martin Olson	February 27, 2010	228	N/A
54	28	"Phineas and Ferb-Busters!"	Jay Lender	Aliki Theofilopoulos Grafft & Antoine Guilbaud	Scott Peterson	February 27, 2010	228	N/A
55	29	"The Lizard Whisperer"	Zac Moncrief	Sherm Cohen & Chong Suk Lee	May Chan, Jennifer Keene & Martin Olson	March 6, 2010	229	N/A
55	29	"Robot Rodeo"	Jay Lender	Kaz & J. G. Orrantia	May Chan	March 6, 2010	229	N/A
56	30	"The Secret of Success"	Zac Moncrief	Kim Roberson & Kaz	May Chan & Jennifer Keene	October 8, 2010 (Note: "The Doof Side of the Moon" was first released on A Very Perry Christmas DVD on October 5, 2010.)	230	N/A
56	30	"The Doof Side of the Moon"	Jay Lender	Edgar Karapetyan & Bernie Petterson	Jon Colton Barry & Martin Olson	October 8, 2010	230	N/A
57	31	"She's the Mayor"	Zac Moncrief	Michael Diederich & Perry Zombolas	Jennifer Keene & Martin Olson	June 14, 2010	231	N/A
57	31	"The Lemonade Stand"	Jay Lender	Aliki Theofilopoulos Grafft & Antoine Guilbaud	May Chan	June 14, 2010	231	N/A
58	32	"We Call It Maze"	Zac Moncrief	Bernie Petterson & Chong Suk Lee	Jennifer Keene	October 1, 2010	232	4.35
58	32	"Ladies and Gentlemen, Meet Max Modem!"	Jay Lender	J. G. Orrantia & Kaz	Scott Peterson	October 1, 2010	232	4.35
59	33	"Nerds of a Feather"	Jay Lender	Jon Colton Barry & Piero Piluso	Jon Colton Barry	August 16, 2010	233	N/A
60	34	"Phineas and Ferb Hawaiian Vacation"	Zac Moncrief	Kaz & Kim Roberson	Jennifer Keene	July 9, 2010 (Note: This episode premiered on Disney Channel prior to Disney XD. This episode premiered on Disney XD on July 12, 2010.)	234	2.95
60	34	"Phineas and Ferb Hawaiian Vacation"	Zac Moncrief	Michael Diederich & Perry Zombolas	May Chan & Jennifer Keene	July 9, 2010	234	2.95
61	35	"Split Personality"	Jay Lender	Aliki Theofilopoulos Grafft & Antoine Guilbaud	Jennifer Keene, Lance LeCompte & Scott Peterson	October 29, 2010	235	N/A
61	35	"Brain Drain"	Jay Lender	J. G. Orrantia & Kaz	Martin Olson	October 29, 2010	235	N/A
62	36	"Make Play"	Zac Moncrief	Bernie Petterson & Edgar Karapetyan	May Chan	February 11, 2011	236	N/A
62	36	"Candace Gets Busted"	Zac Moncrief	Kim Roberson & Kaz	Scott Peterson	February 11, 2011	236	N/A
63	37	"Phineas and Ferb: Summer Belongs to You!" (Note: This episode is a one-hour special.)	Robert F. Hughes & Dan Povenmire	Dan Povenmire, Robert F. Hughes, Kyle Menke, Kim Roberson, Mike Diederich, Aliki Theofilopoulos Grafft, Antoine Guilbaud, Kaz, J. G. Orrantia, Mike Roth & Perry Zombolas	Dan Povenmire & Jeff "Swampy" Marsh	August 2, 2010	237	3.86
64	38	"Phineas and Ferb: Summer Belongs to You!"	Robert F. Hughes & Dan Povenmire	Dan Povenmire, Robert F. Hughes, Kyle Menke, Kim Roberson, Mike Diederich, Aliki Theofilopoulos Grafft, Antoine Guilbaud, Kaz, J. G. Orrantia, Mike Roth & Perry Zombolas	Dan Povenmire & Jeff "Swampy" Marsh	August 2, 2010	238	3.86
65	39	"Rollercoaster: The Musical!"	Dan Povenmire & Robert F. Hughes	Written by : May Chan, Jennifer Keene, Martin Olson & Scott Peterson; Storyboarded by : Flammarion Ferreira, Wendy Grieb, Robert F. Hughes, Chris Headrick & Chong Lee	Dan Povenmire & Jeff "Swampy" Marsh	January 29, 2011	239	N/A

=== Season 3 (2011–12) ===
No. overall	No. in season	Title	Directed by	Written and storyboarded by	Story by	Original release date	Prod. code	U.S. viewers (millions)
66	1	"Run, Candace, Run"	Jay Lender	Michael Diederich, Antoine Guilbaud, Kyle Menke & Perry Zombolas	Sergio Armendariz, Jon Colton Barry, Jennifer Keene & Martin Olson	March 11, 2011	301	3.21
66	1	"Last Train to Bustville"	Robert F. Hughes	Antoine Guilbaud, Jeff Myers & Mike Roth	Martin Olson	March 11, 2011	301	3.21
67	2	"The Great Indoors"	Jay Lender	Chong Suk Lee & Bernie Petterson	Jim Bernstein	March 4, 2011	302	3.31
67	2	"Canderemy"	Jay Lender	J. G. Orrantia & Kim Roberson	Scott Peterson	March 4, 2011	302	3.31
68	3	"The Belly of the Beast"	Jay Lender	Michael Diederich & Kyle Menke	Jim Bernstein	April 29, 2011	303	2.30
68	3	"Moon Farm"	Robert F. Hughes	Antoine Guilbaud & Kaz	Jim Bernstein	April 29, 2011	303	2.30
69	4	"Phineas' Birthday Clip-O-Rama!"	Jay Lender	Chong Suk Lee & Bernie Petterson	Scott Peterson	April 1, 2011	304	2.49
70	5	"Ask a Foolish Question"	Jay Lender	Chong Suk Lee & Bernie Petterson	Martin Olson	May 13, 2011	305	2.56
70	5	"Misperceived Monotreme"	Jay Lender	Kaz & Tom Minton	Martin Olson	May 13, 2011	305	2.56
71	6	"Candace Disconnected"	Robert F. Hughes	Aliki Theofilopoulos Grafft & Antoine Guilbaud	Martin Olson	June 18, 2011	306	N/A
71	6	"Magic Carpet Ride"	Jay Lender	Michael Diederich & Tom Minton	Jennifer Keene	June 18, 2011	306	N/A
72	7	"Bad Hair Day"	Robert F. Hughes	Kaz & Kim Roberson	Jim Bernstein & Lance LeCompte	June 24, 2011	307	4.37
72	7	"Meatloaf Surprise"	Robert F. Hughes	Bernie Petterson & Chong Suk Lee	Martin Olson	June 24, 2011	307	4.37
73	8	"Tri-Stone Area"	Robert F. Hughes	Aliki Theofilopoulos Grafft & Antoine Guilbaud	Scott Peterson	January 13, 2012	308	N/A
73	8	"Doof Dynasty"	Jay Lender	Michael Diederich & Tom Minton	Scott Peterson	January 14, 2012	308	N/A
74	9	"Phineas and Ferb Interrupted"	Jay Lender	Kaz & Kim Roberson	Jennifer Keene	July 15, 2011	309	4.29
74	9	"A Real Boy"	Robert F. Hughes	Aliki Theofilopoulos Grafft & Antoine Guilbaud	Martin Olson, Jim Bernstein & Scott Peterson	July 15, 2011	309	4.29
75	10	"Mommy Can You Hear Me?"	Jay Lender	J. G. Orrantia & Kaz	Jim Bernstein, Martin Olson & Scott Peterson	July 29, 2011	310	3.11
75	10	"Road Trip"	Robert F. Hughes	Written by : Scott Peterson, Kaz & Kim Roberson; Storyboarded by : Kaz & Kim Roberson	-	July 29, 2011	310	3.11
76	11	"Skiddley Whiffers"	Jay Lender	Chong Suk Lee & Tom Minton	Jim Bernstein	August 26, 2011	311	3.81
76	11	"Tour de Ferb"	Jay Lender	Bernie Petterson & Chong Suk Lee	Jim Bernstein & Martin Olson	August 12, 2011	311	3.93
77	12	"My Fair Goalie"	Jeff "Swampy" Marsh & Robert F. Hughes	Jon Colton Barry & Mike Milo	Jon Colton Barry & Jim Bernstein	September 9, 2011	312	4.65
78	13	"Perry the Actorpus"	Robert F. Hughes	Eddy Houchins & Kaz	Scott Peterson	March 3, 2012 (Note: This episode premiered on Disney Channel and Disney XD simultaneously.)	313	N/A
78	13	"Bullseye!"	Jay Lender	J. G. Orrantia & Kaz	Martin Olson	September 30, 2011	313	4.18
79	14	"That's the Spirit!"	Jay Lender	Bernie Petterson & Michael Diederich	Scott Peterson	October 7, 2011	314	2.79
79	14	"The Curse of Candace"	Robert F. Hughes & Jay Lender	J. G. Orrantia & Kaz	Martin Olson	October 7, 2011	314	2.79
80	15	"Escape from Phineas Tower"	Jay Lender	Bernie Petterson, Michael Diederich & Tom Minton	Kaz	October 21, 2011	315	3.34
80	15	"The Remains of the Platypus"	Zac Moncrief	John Mathot & Zac Moncrief	Clint Daniels & Jill Daniels	February 24, 2012	315	3.34
81	16	"Ferb Latin"	Robert F. Hughes & Jay Lender	Antoine Guilbaud & Kaz	Jon Colton Barry & Jim Bernstein	November 25, 2011	316	2.93
81	16	"Lotsa Latkes"	Jay Lender	Chong Suk Lee & Mike Milo	Jon Colton Barry & Jim Bernstein	November 18, 2011	316	3.61
82	17	"A Phineas and Ferb Family Christmas"	Dan Povenmire & Robert F. Hughes	Written by : Scott Peterson; Storyboarded by : Derek Thompson, Seth Kearsley & Wendy Grieb	Scott Peterson	December 2, 2011	317a (Note: 317b is just a repeat of the first season episode "S'Winter".)	4.22
83	18	"What a Croc!"	Robert F. Hughes	Aliki Theofilopoulos Grafft & Antoine Guilbaud	Martin Olson	June 1, 2012	318	2.73
83	18	"Ferb TV"	Robert F. Hughes	Chong Suk Lee & Mike Milo	Scott Peterson	September 7, 2012	318	3.61
84	19	"Mom's in the House"	Jay Lender	Antoine Guilbaud & Kaz	Martin Olson	March 2, 2012	319	2.45
84	19	"Minor Monogram"	Dan Povenmire	Jon Colton Barry & Kyle Menke	Jim Bernstein	May 11, 2012	319	2.78
85	20	"Excaliferb"	Robert F. Hughes	Aliki Theofilopoulos Grafft & J. G. Orrantia	Scott Peterson	January 15, 2012	320	2.17
86	21	"Monster from the Id"	Jay Lender	Kaz & Kim Roberson	Jim Bernstein	February 10, 2012	321	2.51
86	21	"Gi-Ants"	Robert F. Hughes	Mike Milo & Seth Kearsley	Jim Bernstein	February 10, 2012	321	2.51
87	22	"Agent Doof"	Robert F. Hughes	Bernie Petterson & Mike Diederich	Scott Peterson	May 11, 2012	322	2.78
87	22	"Phineas and Ferb and the Temple of Juatchadoon"	Jay Lender	Bernie Petterson & Mike Diederich	Jim Bernstein	January 16, 2012 (Note: This episode premiered on Disney XD prior to Disney Channel. This episode premiered on Disney Channel on January 20, 2012.)	322	N/A
88	23	"Delivery of Destiny"	Robert F. Hughes	Kaz & Kim Roberson	Scott Peterson	April 27, 2012	323	2.94
88	23	"Let's Bounce"	Robert F. Hughes	Kaz & Kim Roberson	Jim Bernstein	March 16, 2012	323	2.94
89	24	"Quietest Day Ever"	Jay Lender	Antoine Guilbaud & Kaz	Jim Bernstein	March 30, 2012	324	2.64
89	24	"Bully Bromance Breakup"	Jay Lender	John Mathot & Mike Milo	Scott Peterson	March 16, 2012	324	2.94
90	25	"The Doonkelberry Imperative"	Jay Lender	Mike Diederich & Bernie Petterson	Martin Olson	March 30, 2012	325	2.64
90	25	"Buford Confidential"	Jay Lender	Kaz & Antoine Guilbaud	Jim Bernstein & Martin Olson	April 27, 2012	325	2.94
91	26	"Sleepwalk Surprise"	Robert F. Hughes	Kaz & Kim Roberson	Scott Peterson	June 8, 2012	326	3.29
91	26	"Sci-Fi Pie Fly"	Jay Lender	John Mathot & Mike Milo	Jim Bernstein & Martin Olson	June 8, 2012	326	3.29
92	27	"Meapless in Seattle"	Robert F. Hughes	Derek Thompson, Jon Colton Barry & Kyle Menke	Jon Colton Barry	April 6, 2012	327	3.06
93	28	"The Mom Attractor"	Robert F. Hughes	Aliki Theofilopoulos Grafft & J. G. Orrantia	Martin Olson	May 4, 2012	328	2.24
93	28	"Cranius Maximus"	Jay Lender	Bernie Petterson & Mike Diederich	Scott Peterson	May 4, 2012	328	2.24
94	29	"Sipping with the Enemy"	Robert F. Hughes	Kaz & Kim Roberson	Scott Peterson	June 22, 2012	329	3.85
94	29	"Tri-State Treasure: Boot of Secrets"	Jay Lender	J. G. Orrantia & Mike Milo	Jim Bernstein	June 22, 2012	329	3.85
95	30	"Doofapus"	Robert F. Hughes	Aliki Theofilopoulos Grafft, J. G. Orrantia & John Mathot	Scott Peterson	July 6, 2012	330	2.67
95	30	"Norm Unleashed"	Jay Lender	Bernie Petterson & Mike Diederich	Jim Bernstein & Martin Olson	July 20, 2012	330	3.26
96	31	"When Worlds Collide"	Robert F. Hughes	Derek Thompson & Kyle Menke	Scott Peterson	September 14, 2012	331	2.64
96	31	"Road to Danville"	Jay Lender	Antoine Guilbaud & Kaz	Jim Bernstein & Jon Colton Barry	October 26, 2012	331	2.73
97	32	"Where's Perry?"	Robert F. Hughes	Bernie Petterson, J. G. Orrantia, Kaz & Kim Roberson	Jim Bernstein, Martin Olson & Scott Peterson	July 26, 2012	332	3.73
98	33	"Where's Perry?"	Jay Lender & Robert F. Hughes	Aliki Theofilopoulos Grafft, Derek Thompson, Edgar Karapetyan, John Mathot, Jon Colton Barry & Kyle Menke	Jim Bernstein, Martin Olson & Scott Peterson	August 24, 2012	333	4.29
99	34	"Blackout!"	Jay Lender	Antoine Guilbaud & Kaz	Jim Bernstein	November 30, 2012	334	2.44
99	34	"What'd I Miss?"	Robert F. Hughes	Aliki Theofilopoulos Grafft & John Mathot	Scott Peterson	September 17, 2012 (Note: This episode premiered on Disney XD prior to Disney Channel. This episode premiered on Disney Channel on September 28, 2012.)	334	N/A
100	35	"This Is Your Backstory"	Jay Lender	Mike Diederich & Seth Kearsley	Scott Peterson	November 2, 2012	335	2.78

=== Season 4 (2012–15) ===
No. overall	No. in season	Title	Directed by	Written and storyboarded by	Story by	Original release date	Prod. code	U.S. viewers (millions)
101	1	"Fly on the Wall"	Sue Perrotto	Aliki Theofilopoulos Grafft & John Mathot	Jim Bernstein	January 11, 2013	401	3.39
101	1	"My Sweet Ride"	Robert F. Hughes	Chris Headrick & Mike Diederich	Dani Vetere	February 1, 2013	401	3.77
102	2	"For Your Ice Only"	Robert F. Hughes	Eddie Pittman & Joshua Pruett	Scott Peterson	December 7, 2012	402	3.70
102	2	"Happy New Year!"	Sue Perrotto	Antoine Guilbaud & Kaz	Dani Vetere	December 7, 2012	402	3.70
103	3	"Bully Bust"	Sue Perrotto	Bernie Petterson & J. G. Orrantia	Jim Bernstein	January 18, 2013	403	2.99
103	3	"Backyard Hodge Podge"	Sue Perrotto	Aliki Theofilopoulos Grafft & John Mathot	Dani Vetere	April 19, 2013	403	2.59
104	4	"Der Kinderlumper"	Robert F. Hughes	Michael B. Singleton & Mike Diederich	Jim Bernstein	February 15, 2013	404	3.14
104	4	"Just Desserts"	Robert F. Hughes	Kaz & Kim Roberson	Dani Vetere	July 5, 2013	404	2.64
105	5	"Bee Day"	Sue Perrotto	Antoine Guilbaud & Kaz	Dani Vetere	April 26, 2013	405	2.44
105	5	"Bee Story"	Sue Perrotto	Bernie Petterson & J. G. Orrantia	Dani Vetere	April 26, 2013	405	2.44
106	6	"Sidetracked"	Robert F. Hughes & Sue Perrotto	Kaz, Kim Roberson, Aliki Theofilopoulos Grafft & John Mathot	Dani Vetere & Scott Peterson	March 1, 2013	406	2.98
107	7	"Knot My Problem"	Sue Perrotto	Antoine Guilbaud & Kaz	Dani Vetere	July 5, 2013	407	2.64
107	7	"Mind Share"	Robert F. Hughes	Michael B. Singleton & Mike Diederich	Martin Olson	April 5, 2013	407	3.24
108	8	"Primal Perry"	Robert F. Hughes	Joshua Pruett & Kyle Menke	Jim Bernstein, Martin Olson & Scott Peterson	March 2, 2013 (Note: This episode premiered on Disney XD prior to Disney Channel. The episode premiered on Disney Channel on May 17, 2013.)	408	N/A
109	9	"La Candace-Cabra"	Sue Perrotto	Bernie Petterson & J. G. Orrantia	Jonathan Howard	July 12, 2013	409	2.69
109	9	"Happy Birthday, Isabella"	Robert F. Hughes	Kaz & Kim Roberson	Scott Peterson	July 12, 2013	409	2.69
110	10	"Great Balls of Water"	Sue Perrotto	Aliki Theofilopoulos Grafft & John Mathot	Jim Bernstein	June 7, 2013	410	3.29
110	10	"Where's Pinky?"	Robert F. Hughes	Eddie Pittman & Joshua Pruett	Dani Vetere, Jim Bernstein & Martin Olson	June 7, 2013	410	3.29
111	11	"Phineas and Ferb: Mission Marvel"	Robert F. Hughes & Sue Perrotto	Kyle Menke, Joshua Pruett, Kim Roberson, Kaz, J. G. Orrantia, Eddie Pittman, Bernie Petterson & Antoine Guilbaud	Dani Vetere, Jim Bernstein, Martin Olson & Scott Peterson	August 16, 2013	411	3.76
112	12	"Phineas and Ferb: Mission Marvel"	Robert F. Hughes & Sue Perrotto	Kyle Menke, Joshua Pruett, Kim Roberson, Kaz, J. G. Orrantia, Eddie Pittman, Bernie Petterson & Antoine Guilbaud	Dani Vetere, Jim Bernstein, Martin Olson & Scott Peterson	August 16, 2013	412	3.76
113	13	"Thanks But No Thanks"	Sue Perrotto	Antoine Guilbaud & Kaz	Martin Olson	September 13, 2013	413	2.51
113	13	"Troy Story"	Robert F. Hughes	Mike Diederich & Michael B. Singleton	Jim Bernstein & Scott Peterson	September 20, 2013	413	2.55
114	14	"Love at First Byte"	Sue Perrotto	Eddie Pittman & J. G. Orrantia	Martin Olson	August 2, 2013	414	2.83
114	14	"One Good Turn"	Robert F. Hughes	Edward Rivera & Mike Diederich	Jim Bernstein	August 9, 2013	414	3.31
115	15	"Cheers for Fears"	Sue Perrotto	Aliki Theofilopoulos Grafft, John Mathot & Kim Roberson	Dani Vetere	November 1, 2013	415	2.41
115	15	"Just Our Luck"	Sue Perrotto	Aliki Theofilopoulos Grafft & John Mathot	Dani Vetere	January 10, 2014	415	1.75
116	16	"Return Policy"	Sue Perrotto	Mike Bell & Patrick O'Connor	Dani Vetere	January 24, 2014	416	2.23
116	16	"Imperfect Storm"	Robert F. Hughes	Bernie Petterson & Joshua Pruett	Martin Olson	June 11, 2014	416	0.44
117	17	"Steampunx"	Robert F. Hughes	Bernie Petterson & Joshua Pruett	Dani Vetere	November 15, 2013	417	1.70
117	17	"It's No Picnic"	Sue Perrotto	J. G. Orrantia & Eddie Pittman	Dani Vetere	June 23, 2014	417	0.48
118	18	"Terrifying Tri-State Trilogy of Terror"	Robert F. Hughes	Mike Bell, Kim Roberson, Aliki Theofilopoulos Grafft & John Mathot	Dani Vetere, Martin Olson & Scott Peterson	October 5, 2013	418	3.02
119	19	"Druselsteinoween"	Robert F. Hughes	Kyle Menke & Mike Diederich	Dani Vetere	October 4, 2013	419	2.65
119	19	"Face Your Fear"	Robert F. Hughes	Bernie Petterson & Joshua Pruett	Martin Olson	October 11, 2013	419	2.14
120	20	"The Klimpaloon Ultimatum"	Sue Perrotto	Patrick O'Connor, Zac Moncrief, Edward Rivera & Mike Diederich	Dan Povenmire, Dani Vetere, Jim Bernstein, Martin Olson & Scott Peterson	July 7, 2014	420	N/A
121	21	"Doof 101"	Robert F. Hughes	Kim Roberson, Zac Moncrief & Dan Povenmire	Dan Povenmire & Jeff "Swampy" Marsh	November 27, 2014 (Note: This episode was first released in Phineas and Ferb: Star Wars DVD on October 21, 2014.)	421	0.24
121	21	"Father's Day"	Sue Perrotto	Edward Rivera & Patrick O'Connor	Scott Peterson	June 10, 2014	421	0.41
122	22	"Operation Crumb Cake"	Robert F. Hughes	Kim Roberson & Mike Bell	Dani Vetere	July 14, 2014	422	0.48
122	22	"Mandace"	Sue Perrotto	Aliki Theofilopoulos Grafft & John Mathot	Jim Bernstein	July 14, 2014	422	0.48
123	23	"Tales from the Resistance: Back to the 2nd Dimension"	Robert F. Hughes	Joshua Pruett, Mike Bell, Kyle Menke & Mike Diederich	Jim Bernstein	November 25, 2014	423	0.54
124	24	"The Return of the Rogue Rabbit"	Robert F. Hughes	Michael B. Singleton & Mike Diederich	Scott Peterson	June 16, 2014	424	0.29
124	24	"Live and Let Drive"	Sue Perrotto	Eddie Pittman & J. G. Orrantia	Jeff "Swampy" Marsh, Jim Bernstein, Martin Olson & Scott Peterson	March 1, 2014	424	0.41
125	25	"Lost in Danville"	Sue Perrotto	Eddie Pittman & J. G. Orrantia	Damon Lindelof	September 29, 2014	425	0.54
125	25	"The Inator Method"	Sue Perrotto	Edward Rivera & Patrick O'Connor	Dani Vetere	September 29, 2014	425	0.54
126	26	"Act Your Age"	Robert F. Hughes	Bernie Petterson & Kim Roberson	Dani Vetere	February 9, 2015	426	0.71
127	27	"Phineas and Ferb Save Summer"	Robert F. Hughes & Sue Perrotto	J. G. Orrantia, Eddie Pittman, Aliki Theofilopoulos Grafft, Joshua Pruett, John Mathot, Mike Bell, Kyle Menke & Mike Diederich	Dani Vetere, Jim Bernstein, Martin Olson & Scott Peterson	June 9, 2014 (Note: This episode was available on Watch Disney XD and Disney XD On Demand on May 21, 2014.)	427	0.56
128	28	"Phineas and Ferb Save Summer"	Robert F. Hughes & Sue Perrotto	J. G. Orrantia, Eddie Pittman, Aliki Theofilopoulos Grafft, Joshua Pruett, John Mathot, Mike Bell, Kyle Menke & Mike Diederich	Dani Vetere, Jim Bernstein, Martin Olson & Scott Peterson	June 9, 2014	428	0.56
129	29	"Night of the Living Pharmacists"	Sue Perrotto & Robert F. Hughes	Eddie Pittman, Kim Roberson, Bernie Petterson, Patrick O'Connor, J. G. Orrantia, Joshua Pruett, Edward Rivera, Aliki Theofilopoulos Grafft & Kyle Menke	Joshua Pruett, Scott Peterson, Jim Bernstein & Dani Vetere	October 4, 2014 (Note: This episode premiered on Disney Channel prior to Disney XD. The episode premiered on Disney XD on October 10, 2014.)	429	2.34
130	30	"Night of the Living Pharmacists"	Sue Perrotto & Robert F. Hughes	Eddie Pittman, Kim Roberson, Bernie Petterson, Patrick O'Connor, J. G. Orrantia, Joshua Pruett, Edward Rivera, Aliki Theofilopoulos Grafft & Kyle Menke	Joshua Pruett, Scott Peterson, Jim Bernstein & Dani Vetere	October 4, 2014	430	2.34
131	31	"Phineas and Ferb: Star Wars"	Robert F. Hughes & Sue Perrotto	Kyle Menke, John Mathot, Mike Bell, Mike Diederich, Michael B. Singleton, Edward Rivera, Patrick O'Connor, J. G. Orrantia & Eddie Pittman	Dani Vetere, Jim Bernstein, Martin Olson & Scott Peterson	July 26, 2014 (Note: This episode premiered on Disney Channel prior to Disney XD. The episode premiered on Disney XD on August 4, 2014.)	431	2.48
132	32	"Phineas and Ferb: Star Wars"	Robert F. Hughes & Sue Perrotto	Kyle Menke, John Mathot, Mike Bell, Mike Diederich, Michael B. Singleton, Edward Rivera, Patrick O'Connor, J. G. Orrantia & Eddie Pittman	Dani Vetere, Jim Bernstein, Martin Olson & Scott Peterson	July 26, 2014	432	2.48
133	33	"Last Day of Summer"	Sue Perrotto & Robert F. Hughes	Aliki Theofilopoulos, Bernie Petterson, Calvin Suggs, John Mathot, Joshua Pruett, Kaz, Kim Roberson & Mike Diederich	Dani Vetere, Scott Peterson, Jim Bernstein & Martin Olson	June 12, 2015	433	2.94
134	34	"Last Day of Summer"	Sue Perrotto & Robert F. Hughes	Aliki Theofilopoulos, Bernie Petterson, Calvin Suggs, John Mathot, Joshua Pruett, Kaz, Kim Roberson & Mike Diederich	Dani Vetere, Scott Peterson, Jim Bernstein & Martin Olson	June 12, 2015	434	2.94
135	35	"Phineas and Ferb's Musical Cliptastic Countdown Hosted by Kelly Osbourne"	Kim Roberson (uncredited)	Written by : Bobby Gaylor (uncredited)	-	June 28, 2013	435	3.12
136	36	"O.W.C.A. Files"	Robert F. Hughes	Aliki Theofilopoulos, Bernie Petterson, Calvin Suggs, Eddie Pittman, John Mathot, Kim Roberson, Kaz, Kyle Menke, & Mike Bell	Joshua Pruett, Martin Olson & Scott Peterson	November 9, 2015	436	0.66
137	37	"O.W.C.A. Files"	Robert F. Hughes	Aliki Theofilopoulos, Bernie Petterson, Calvin Suggs, Eddie Pittman, John Mathot, Kim Roberson, Kaz, Kyle Menke, & Mike Bell	Joshua Pruett, Martin Olson & Scott Peterson	November 9, 2015	437	0.66

=== Season 5 (2025–26) ===
No. overall	No. in season	Title	Directed by	Written by	Storyboarded by	Original release date	Prod. code	U.S. viewers (millions) (Note: These ratings combine the amount of viewers watching the premieres of episodes on Disney Channel and Disney XD, which simulcasts the premieres.)
138	1	"Summer Block Buster" (Part 1)	Amber Tornquist Hollinger	Scott Peterson	Bryan L. Francis & Sang Young Ha	May 26, 2025 (Note: This episode premiered as a sneak peek. It made its official premiere on June 5, 2025.)	501	0.17
138	1	"Cloudy With a Chance of Mom" (Part 2)	Chris Ybarra	Scott Peterson	Dodo Kitcharoen, Ryann Shannon & Kyle Menke	June 5, 2025	501	0.27
139	2	"Submarine Sandwich Submarine"	James Kim	Oscar Lemus & Joshua Pruett	Samir Barrett & Wendy Grieb	June 5, 2025	502	0.28
139	2	"License to Bust"	Amber Tornquist Hollinger	Kim Roberson	Deena Beck & King Pecora	June 5, 2025	502	0.28
140	3	"Dry Another Day"	Chris Ybarra	Sunny Karnan	HyeonJeong Chozon & Nadine Promes García	June 14, 2025 (Note: This episode was first released on Disney+ on June 6, 2025.)	503	0.15
140	3	"Deconstructing Doof"	James Kim	Olivia Olson & Martin Olson	Bryan L. Francis & Sang Young Ha	June 14, 2025	503	0.15
141	4	"Tropey McTropeface"	Amber Tornquist Hollinger	Scott Peterson	Dodo Kitcharoen & Ryann Shannon	June 14, 2025	504	0.17
141	4	"Biblio-Blast!"	Chris Ybarra	Joshua Pruett	Samir Barrett & Wendy Grieb	June 14, 2025	504	0.17
142	5	"A Chip to the Vet"	James Kim	Kim Roberson	Deena Beck & King Pecora	June 21, 2025	505	0.17
142	5	"More Than an Intern"	Amber Tornquist Hollinger	Sunny Karnan	HyeonJeong Chozon & Nadine Promes García	June 21, 2025	505	0.17
143	6	"The Aurora Perry-Alis"	Chris Ybarra	Olivia Olson & Martin Olson	Bryan L. Francis, Derek Lee Thompson & Sang Young Ha	June 21, 2025	506	0.17
143	6	"Lord of the Firesides"	James Kim	Oscar Lemus	Dodo Kitcharoen & Ryann Shannon	June 21, 2025	506	0.17
144	7	"The Candace Suit"	Chris Ybarra	Kim Roberson	Deena Beck & King Pecora	June 28, 2025	507	0.40
144	7	"Agent T (for Teen)"	Amber Tornquist Hollinger	Scott Peterson	Samir Barrett & Wendy Grieb	June 28, 2025	507	0.40
145	8	"The Haberdasher"	James Kim	Joshua Pruett	HyeonJeong Chozon & Nadine Promes García	June 28, 2025	508	0.48
145	8	"Out of Character"	Amber Tornquist Hollinger	Sunny Karnan	Bryan L. Francis & Sang Young Ha	June 28, 2025	508	0.48
146	9	"Meap Me in St. Louis"	James Kim & Chris Ybarra	Jon Colton Barry	Samir Barrett, Wendy Grieb, Dodo Kitcharoen & Derek Lee Thompson	July 5, 2025	509	N/A
147	10	"No Slumber Party"	Amber Tornquist Hollinger	Kim Roberson	Deena Beck & King Pecora	July 12, 2025	510	0.22
147	10	"The Ballad of Bubba Doof"	Chris Ybarra	Olivia Olson & Martin Olson	HyeonJeong Chozon & Nadine Promes García	July 12, 2025	510	0.22
148	11	"Attack of the Candace Suit"	James Kim	Scott Peterson	Bryan L. Francis & Sang Young Ha	July 19, 2025	511	0.14
148	11	"Book Flub"	Amber Tornquist Hollinger	Kim Roberson	Dodo Kitcharoen & Derek Lee Thompson	July 19, 2025	511	0.14
149	12	"The Bad Old Days"	Chris Ybarra	Oscar Lemus & Olivia Olson	Samir Barrett, Wendy Grieb & Deena Beck	July 26, 2025	512	0.20
149	12	"Mantis Fact!"	James Kim	Sunny Karnan	Deena Beck & King Pecora	July 26, 2025	512	0.20
150	13	"The Nightmare-Inator"	Amber Tornquist Hollinger	Scott Peterson & Joshua Pruett	HyeonJeong Chozon & Nadine Promes García	August 2, 2025	513	0.13
150	13	"Doof in Retrograde"	Chris Ybarra	Joshua Pruett	Bryan L. Francis, Sang Young Ha & Deena Beck	August 2, 2025	513	0.13
151	14	"Bend It Like Doof"	James Kim	Oscar Lemus	Dodo Kitcharoen & Derek Lee Thompson	October 18, 2025	514	0.12
151	14	"Dooflicated"	Amber Tornquist Hollinger	Olivia Olson & Martin Olson	Sofia Alexander, Wendy Grieb, Deena Beck & King Pecora	October 18, 2025	514	0.12
152	15	"Space Adventure"	Bob Bowen	Bob Bowen	Bob Bowen	October 25, 2025	515	N/A
152	15	"Droogenfest"	James Kim	Sunny Karnan	HyeonJeong Chozon, Nadine Promes García, Ram Patel & King Pecora	October 25, 2025	515	N/A
153	16	"Doofercise"	Amber Tornquist Hollinger	Kim Roberson	Bryan L. Francis, Sang Young Ha & Ram Patel	November 1, 2025	516	0.14
153	16	"Croquet Y-8"	Chris Ybarra	Joshua Pruett	Dodo Kitcharoen & Derek Lee Thompson	November 1, 2025	516	0.14
154	17	"Dinner Reservations"	James Kim	Olivia Olson & Martin Olson	Sofia Alexander, Wendy Grieb, Ram Patel & King Pecora	November 8, 2025	517	0.09
154	17	"Bread Bowl Hot Tub"	Amber Tornquist Hollinger	Sunny Karnan	Deena Beck, King Pecora & Ram Patel	November 8, 2025	517	0.09
155	18	"Entrance Exam"	Chris Ybarra	Kim Roberson	HyeonJeong Chozon & Nadine Promes García	November 15, 2025	518	0.10
155	18	"Dungeons & Dating"	James Kim	Oscar Lemus	Bryan L. Francis & Sang Young Ha	November 15, 2025	518	0.10
156	19	"Elevator Irritator"	Amber Tornquist Hollinger	Scott Peterson	Dodo Kitcharoen, Derek Lee Thompson & Sang Young Ha	January 16, 2026	519	0.16
156	19	"Master of Fate"	Chris Ybarra	Shane Lincoln	Sofia Alexander & Wendy Grieb	January 16, 2026	519	0.16
157	20	"Vendpocalypse: The Musical"	Amber Tornquist Hollinger & James Kim	Joshua Pruett	Deena Beck, Ram Patel, King Pecora, HyeonJeong Chozon, Kyle Menke & Nadine Promes García	January 16, 2026	520	0.14

=== Season 6 (2026) ===
No. overall	No. in season	Title	Directed by	Written by	Storyboarded by	Original release date	Prod. code	U.S. viewers (millions) (Note: These ratings combine the amount of viewers watching the premieres of episodes on Disney Channel and Disney XD, which simulcasts the premieres.)
164	1	"Night of the Living Candace Suits"	James Kim	Scott Peterson	Sang Young Ha & Nadine Promes García	October 6, 2026	607	TBD
164	1	"Terrors of the AltSpace"	Chris Ybarra	Joshua Pruett	HyeonJeong Chozon & Derek Lee Thompson	October 6, 2026	607	TBD

== Films ==
Title	Directed by	Written by	Storyboarded by	Original release date	U.S. viewers (millions)
Phineas and Ferb the Movie: Across the 2nd Dimension	Dan Povenmire & Robert F. Hughes	Jon Colton Barry, Dan Povenmire & Jeff "Swampy" Marsh	Kyle Menke, Aliki Theofilopoulos Grafft, Antoine Guilbaud, Bernie Petterson, Chong Suk Lee, Chris Headrick, J. G. Orrantia, Kaz, Kim Roberson, Mike Diederich, Seth Kearsley, Sue Perrotto, Tom Minton, Wendy Grieb, & Zac Moncrief	August 5, 2011	7.64
Phineas and Ferb the Movie: Candace Against the Universe	Bob Bowen	Dan Povenmire, Jeff "Swampy" Marsh, Jon Colton Barry, Jim Bernstein, Joshua Pruett, Kate Kondell, Jeffrey M. Howard & Bob Bowen	Albert Calleros, Christopher Headrick, Tammy Manis, Ram Patel, Nick Sazani, Aimee Steinberger, Steven Umbleby & Matt Whitlock	August 28, 2020	N/A

== Crossover ==
Title	Directed by	Written by	Storyboarded by	Original release date	Prod. code	U.S. viewers (millions)
"The Phineas and Ferb Effect"	Bob Bowen & Robert F. Hughes	Story by : Jim Bernstein, Martin Olson, Scott Peterson, Joshua Pruett & Dani Vetere; Written by : Jim Bernstein, Martin Olson, Scott Peterson & Joshua Pruett	Lauren Andrews, Jacob Hair, Kyle Menke, Steven Umbleby, & Chris Ybarra	January 5, 2019 (Note: This episode first premiered in: Japan on August 10, 2018; Germany, Italy, Poland, Sub-Saharan Africa, Spain, and the UK on September 10, 2018; Also, in the United States, this episode premiered on both Disney Channel and Disney XD simultaneously.)	201 (MML)	0.68
