= Phineas and Ferb (disambiguation) =

Phineas and Ferb is an animated television show.

Phineas and Ferb may refer to:

- Phineas and Ferb (soundtrack), a soundtrack for the show
- Phineas and Ferb (video game), a video game based on the show
- Phineas Flynn and Ferb Fletcher, the two protagonists of the show
