= Phineas and Ferb's Quantum Boogaloo =

- Phineas and Ferb episode
- Episode no.: Season 2 Episode 12
- Directed by: Zac Moncrief
- Written by: Scott Peterson (story); Kim Roberson (storyboards); Kaz (storyboards)
- Production code: 212
- Original air dates: September 21, 2009 (Disney XD); September 25, 2009 (Disney Channel)

Guest appearances
- Bowling for Soup as themselves; Jennifer Stone as Amanda; Moises Arias as Fred; Jennifer Grey as the librarian; Noah Munck as Xavier

Episode chronology
← Previous "Spa Day"	Next → "Phineas and Ferb's Musical Cliptastic Countdown"
- Phineas and Ferb (season 2)

"Phineas and Ferb's Quantum Boogaloo" is the 12th episode of the second season of Phineas and Ferb, the 25th episode of the season to be broadcast, and the 38th episode overall. It originally aired on Disney XD in the United States on September 21, 2009, and later aired on Disney Channel on September 25, 2009. In the episode, Phineas and his stepbrother Ferb travel into the future and have their time machine stolen by their older sister Candace, now an adult, who travels back in time to get her brothers in trouble during one of their outlandish schemes. In doing so, however, she sets off a chain reaction leading to a dystopian future ruled by the evil Dr. Doofenshmirtz.

"Phineas and Ferb's Quantum Boogaloo" was written by Scott Peterson and directed by Zac Moncrief. The episode was conceived as a means of expanding the time machine plot that was introduced previously in the episode "It's About Time." Dan Povenmire and Jeff "Swampy" Marsh, co-creators of Phineas and Ferb, centralized plot elements to satirize time travel films, such as The Time Machine (1960) and the Back to the Future trilogy (1985-1990). Multiple scenes in the episode were meant to be rather confusing and difficult to understand in order to interest viewers so they would watch the episode multiple times, trying to learn something new each time.

The episode received generally positive reviews from television critics. In its original broadcast, it ranked fourth in the key demographics Boys 6–14, Kids 6–11 and Boys 6–11, totaling 599,000 viewers, an 88 percent increase from that of the previous year's ratings in the timeslot. When the episode premiered on Disney Channel on September 25, 2009, it was the thirteenth-highest-ranked cable program for the entire week. The episode guest starred actors Jennifer Stone, Moises Arias, Noah Munck, and Jennifer Grey, along with the band Bowling for Soup, who appeared as themselves performing an extended version of the series' theme song, "Today's Gonna Be a Great Day," which was also included on the official Phineas and Ferb soundtrack, which was released on September 22, 2009.

== Plot summary ==
Phineas and his stepbrother Ferb learn from their friend Baljeet that a tool they need for their latest project has yet to be invented. They and their friend Isabella borrow the time machine on display at the local museum to travel twenty years into the future. Once they arrive, Isabella stays behind with the time machine while the boys enter their sister Candace's backyard, where her sons Fred and Xavier are sitting under a tree doing nothing. The boys convince their future nephews to be active and in return are given the tool they need. As they leave, Candace spots them and it brings back upsetting memories of never being able to bust the boys. She takes her mother Linda to the museum where the boys leave, right before Linda can see them.

Professor Onassis, who invented the time machine in the 1800s, arrives in the original version of the machine soon after and future Candace steals it. She travels back to the day the boys built the rollercoaster in their backyard and succeeds in getting her mother to see them, finally fulfilling her dream of busting them. However, in doing so, she accidentally leads Perry, their pet platypus who is secretly a suave secret agent, to be injured while stopping an evil magnet mechanism. As a result, Perry's nemesis, Dr. Doofenshmirtz, comes out unharmed from the effects of the now-destroyed machine. Over time, everything is altered and the Tri-State Area becomes childproof for fear of a repeat of Phineas and Ferb's dangerous activities, and all children are stored away until adulthood. Doofenshmirtz eventually gains the upper hand, effectively becoming the ruler. He claims to be a nice Emperor, though, since he can remember everyone's name (though this is considerably easier than it seems, since one of his rules is that everyone has to be named Joe and requires everyone to wear lab coats at all times). Also, because of Doofenshmirtz succeeding, the Agency is now forced into an oath to obey him, resulting a demoralized Perry to fail more on his missions against Doofenshmirtz and is forbidden to use the time machine that Candace previously used as suggested by Major Monogram. After arriving in the dystopian future Doofenshmirtz rules, Candace finds the time machine in a junk yard and returns to the day of the rollercoaster to stop herself from interfering like before, stopping the dystopia from occurring.

The time machine gets destroyed so the two Candaces go to the backyard to convince the boys to fix the current time machine in the museum and take them back, creating a paradox and as a result, the Candace from the bleak future (wearing a white lab coat) ceases to exist. The boys then fix the machine. Isabella says to Ferb that a rollercoaster ride and time travel was a bonus. The present Candace tags along with her future self, Phineas, Ferb, and Isabella as they travel to the future (while Candace "finally" busting them in the process, but the future Linda is not angry at the boys, saying she doesn't have jurisdiction to bust the boys anymore). As Candace and the boys talk to the future Linda, Isabella sparks an idea and travels back in time. After returning to the present time, Candace leaves in victory, now happy that she had finally (technically) busted her brothers. During the credits, it reveals Isabella obtained the tool and gave it to the present day boys before they even time traveled in the first place. This causes them to change their minds about going into the future, thus, canceling out all the events that happened earlier in the episode and also causing all the characters involved in the future to cease existence (also erasing the "busting" present Candace caused, thus possibly causing a time loop).

== Voice cast ==
- Vincent Martella as Phineas Flynn (Past and Present)
- Thomas Sangster as Ferb Fletcher (Past and Present)
- Ashley Tisdale as Candace Flynn (Past, Present and Future/bad Future)
- Caroline Rhea as Linda Flynn-Fletcher (Past, Present and Future)
- Alyson Stoner as Isabella Garcia-Shapiro (Past and Present), Additional Voices
- Maulik Pancholy as Baljeet Tjinder
- Dan Povenmire as Dr. Heinz Doofenshmirtz (Past, Present and Future/bad Future), Additional Voices
- Jeff Swampy Marsh as Major Monogram (Future), Additional Voices
- Tyler Alexander Mann as Carl (Future), Additional Voices
- Dee Bradley Baker as Perry the Platypus (Past and Future/bad Future), Additional Voices
- Kelly Hu as Stacy Hirano
- Noah Munck as Xavier
- Moises Arias as Fred
- Jennifer Stone as Amanda
- Jennifer Grey as Librarian, Additional Voices
- Bowling For Soup as Themselves
- Tom Kenny, Jaret Reddick, Richard O’Brien, Charlie Schlatter and Danny Jacob as Additional Voices

== Production ==
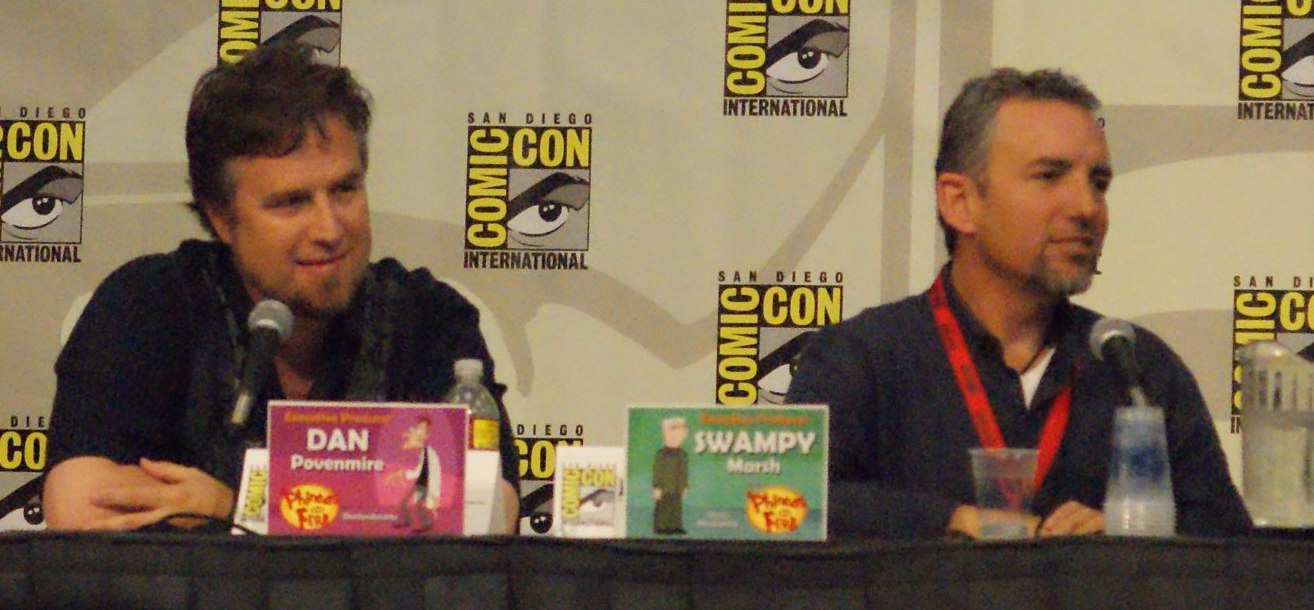
Series co-creators Dan Povenmire and Jeff "Swampy" Marsh cited the inspiration behind "Phineas and Ferb's Quantum Boogaloo" to the season 1 episode "It's About Time!"

"Phineas and Ferb's Quantum Boogaloo" was written by Scott Peterson and directed by Zac Moncrief. Phineas and Ferb had previously produced an episode in season one's "It's About Time!", which featured a time machine. Co-creator Dan Povenmire stated that he enjoyed the outcome of said episode. The writers purposely left the time machine available for the boys' use at the end of the episode so that they could reuse it in a later episode. Eventually, they conceived a plot where "Phineas and Ferb go into the future and actually see Candace as an adult (which) drags up all kinds of memories of not being able to bust them."

The scenes in which Candace travels back to Phineas and Ferb building a roller coaster are taken from the pilot episode, "Rollercoaster." Including the scenes was "great fun" for Povenmire and fellow co-creator Jeff "Swampy" Marsh, who decided early on that using it would have "future Candace go back to the rollercoaster [sic]. Then whatever she did would affect the future, in this case give Doofenshmirtz the upper hand and effectively change history." The inclusion was inspired by the Star Trek: Deep Space Nine episode "Trials and Tribble-ations," in which the Deep Space 9 crew travel back in time to the Star Trek episode "The Trouble with Tribbles." The novel approach was viewed by Marsh as "a great way to interweave a story."

The crew spent a long amount of time plotting out the episode in a room, using sticky notes, in order to make sure it played out sensibly and was clearly understandable to viewers. The production staff based a lot of the usage of time travel in "Phineas and Ferb's Quantum Boogaloo" on those from the Back to the Future trilogy (1985-1990) and H. G. Wells' The Time Machine (1960). The goal of the crew was to make sure everything stayed strong to a certain logical standpoint, which led to several surreal conversations, including several paradoxes involving time travel. The crew members sought to venture into elements that seemed complicated, as their children viewers were deemed intelligent enough to understand such elements. The hopes of the production staff was to make the episode one that they could watch multiple times and notice something new with each viewing.

Since Doofenshmirtz and Perry's actions tend to affect those of the boys, the choice to have future Candace's interference in the past greatly affect those of Doofenshmirtz and Perry's was considered the logical choice. Povenmire explained, "They affect each other in ways that we never fully understand, but if you throw off that little balance of power of their [respective] activities, all hell could break loose." The song Doofenshmirtz sings, entitled "It's Been a Charmed Life," was well-praised by the production crew, who felt that it was considerably well-handled. The song centralized the irony surrounding Doofenshmirtz having everything go well for him, a theme completely different from that which is generally touched upon in the series.

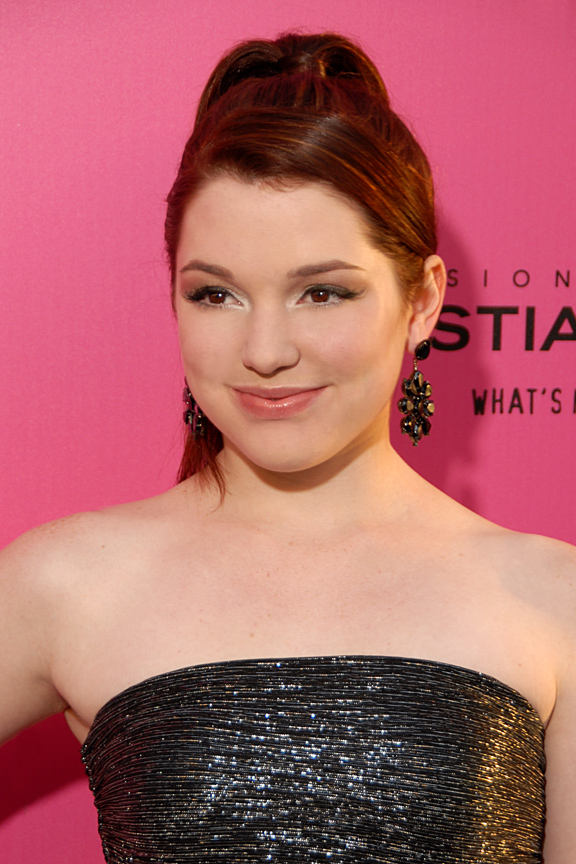
Jennifer Stone guest starred in the episode as Amanda.

The scene where Candace mentions that her best friend Stacy Hirano had become the president of Uruguay was originally written as a throwaway joke for the episode. During an e-mail exchange between the crew, some crew members were curious about the line and Povenmire came up with an entire backstory, in which Stacy meets the prince of the country, moves there and, after changing several laws, becomes eligible for the presidency. The staff enjoyed the idea and wrote it down as a possible plot for a future episode.

"Phineas and Ferb's Quantum Boogaloo" featured multiple guest appearances. Actress Jennifer Stone guest starred as Amanda, Candace's future daughter. Stone researched actress Ashley Tisdale's performance as Candace on YouTube to better grasp the attention needed on the voice role. Stone recorded her lines a long time before the final animation came in and was feeling impatient about how the end results would come out. Moises Arias, who is, according to Stone, "like [her] little brother," voiced Candace's future son, Fred. Actress Jennifer Grey also appeared as a librarian. Grey's character in Ferris Bueller's Day Off was the inspiration for Candace and the actress had previously portrayed Doofenshmirtz's professor in "Oil on Candace."

"Phineas and Ferb's Quantum Boogaloo" originally broadcast on September 21, 2009, on Disney XD and then on September 25, 2009, on Disney Channel. Like all episodes of Phineas and Ferb, it carried a TV-G parental guidance rating. The song "Today is Gonna Be a Great Day" is available on the official Phineas and Ferb soundtrack, which was released on September 22, 2009, a day after the episode's broadcast.

== Cultural references ==
"Phineas and Ferb's Quantum Boogaloo" serves as a parody of time travel films, particularly the Back to the Future film series and H. G. Wells' The Time Machine. Candace stealing the time machine to change something in the past, thus creating a dystopian future, mirrors the scene in Back to the Future Part II (1989), in which Biff Tannen steals the Delorean time machine and causes a dark and chaotic future in the process. In the future, the American pop-punk band Bowling for Soup appears and performs an extended version of the series' theme song. The band members were designed to look twenty years older and having gained weight.

== Reception ==
"Phineas and Ferb's Quantum Boogaloo" ranked fourth in its timeslot, in the demographics Boys 6–14, Kids 6–11 and Boys 6–11. It averaged 599,000 total viewers, an 88 percent increase over the previous year's record for the timeslot. In Kids 6–14, it outranked previous year's records by 152 percent. In Boys 6–14, it claimed over a 121 percent increase, in Boys 6–11, it garnered an over 116 percent increase, and in Boys 9-14, an over 138 percent registered increase. When the episode aired on Disney Channel for the first time, it was watched by 2.7 million American households and 3.9 million individual viewers, placing it at number 13 in cable network ratings for the entire week.

The episode received generally positive reviews from television critics. Matt Blum of Wired called it "probably the geekiest episode of the show so far". Blum praised the joke about Stacy becoming the president of Uruguay and called Doofenshmirtz's song "It's Been a Charmed Life" "heavy irony." Paige Wiser of the Chicago Sun-Times considered the episode one of September 21's television highlights, writing that she "could not be more excited." News OK listed the episode on its "Top 55 TV Programs for Sept. 20-26, 2009", and all three guest stars appeared on its list of "Top 30 Guest Stars on TV Shows airing Sept. 20-26, 2009". Povenmire considered the episode one of his favorites of the series.
