= Red Nose Day Actually =

2017 British romantic comedy short film

- Promotional poster for the American version (Laura Linney, featured on the poster, does not appear in the original UK broadcast).
- Based on: Characters from Love Actually by Richard Curtis
- Written by: Richard Curtis
- Directed by: Richard Curtis; Mat Whitecross
- Starring: Hugh Grant; Liam Neeson; Colin Firth; Andrew Lincoln; Chiwetel Ejiofor; Keira Knightley; Martine McCutcheon; Bill Nighy; Thomas Sangster; Lúcia Moniz; Olivia Olson; Marcus Brigstocke; Rowan Atkinson
- Country of origin: United Kingdom
- Original language: English

Production
- Producer: Fiona Neilson
- Cinematography: Andrew Dunn
- Editor: Marc Richardson
- Running time: 15 minutes

Original release
- Network: BBC One
- Release: 24 March 2017

Red Nose Day Actually is a 2017 British romantic comedy television short promotional film, following a dozen of the characters from Richard Curtis' Christmas film Love Actually, as part of the fundraising event Red Nose Day 2017. Curtis returns with many of the cast members from the original film including Hugh Grant, Liam Neeson, Colin Firth, Andrew Lincoln, Chiwetel Ejiofor, Keira Knightley, Martine McCutcheon, Bill Nighy, Thomas Sangster, Lúcia Moniz, Olivia Olson, Marcus Brigstocke, and Rowan Atkinson.

The short film was first broadcast on BBC One on 24 March 2017, as a part of Red Nose Day. A slightly different version of the film, featuring Laura Linney reprising her role and Patrick Dempsey, was broadcast in the US on 25 May 2017.

== Plot ==
The film is set in March 2017, 13 years after the events of the original film.

Juliet is watching television with her husband Peter. When the doorbell rings and she opens the door, Juliet finds Mark, who, similarly to 13 years ago, communicates with her by using cue cards, having her pretend to Peter, this time, that Mark is a fund raiser for Red Nose Day. They tell each other that they are very happy with their respective lives, and Mark presents his new wife, who is none other than British supermodel Kate Moss, whom, 13 years prior, he jokingly said he was going to marry. Mark's final card proposes that they see what happened to the rest of their friends.

David, who has lost and recently regained his position as Prime Minister since the first film, dances in his official residence once again (this time to Hotline Bling, as opposed to Jump (For My Love) in the original), even continuing in great pain after falling down the stairs. His wife and former employee Natalie amicably reprimands him, and offers to make him tea. Later in a public speech, he states that although times are harder for a lot of people now, he still believes that love and the good in people will win in the end.

Billy Mack recently released a charity single, a cover of the 1983 ZZ Top song "Gimme All Your Lovin'". As the reporter interviewing him on radio tries to help him raise awareness for Red Nose Day, Billy openly admits to not caring about children (except for the ones that buy his discs) and that he only promotes the charity to, in truth, get free publicity for his upcoming autobiography, which he has admittedly neither written nor read. He then reveals with sadness that his manager Joe has died from a heart attack since the first film, before stating that the greatest sex he ever had was with one of the Kardashians, although he cannot decide which one.

Among salesman Rufus's products are red noses in honour of Red Nose Day. When a child in line buys one and agrees to have it gift wrapped, Rufus proceeds with great delight to take an absurdly excessive amount of time doing so. The waiting line soon becomes so long that it blocks car traffic outside.

Meanwhile, on their way to pick up their three children from school, Jamie and his wife Aurélia recall their first days together. Aurélia says in Portuguese that even though life makes it impossible to be completely happy, love sometimes makes you feel like you are. She then reveals to Jamie that she is pregnant with their fourth child, though he misunderstands her and believes she was telling him what was for dinner.

Sitting on a bench near the Thames, Daniel receives a surprise visit from his stepson Sam, who is now 26 and lives in New York City, New York, USA. When Daniel expresses concern because Sam had not been in touch, he is surprised to see Joanna, Sam's childhood crush 13 years ago who had left for US. She asks for Sam's hand in marriage, and Daniel, delighted, jokingly answers that he will think about it.

The film then ends with footage showing various people and actions supported by Comic Relief, and some of the film's cast wearing red noses.

== Cast ==
- Hugh Grant as David
- Liam Neeson as Daniel
- Colin Firth as Jamie
- Andrew Lincoln as Mark
- Chiwetel Ejiofor as Peter
- Keira Knightley as Juliet
- Martine McCutcheon as Natalie
- Bill Nighy as Billy Mack
- Thomas Sangster as Sam
- Lúcia Moniz as Aurélia
- Olivia Olson as Joanna
- Marcus Brigstocke as Mikey
- Rowan Atkinson as Rufus
- Kate Moss as herself
- Victoria Derbyshire as Journalist
- Charlie Stayt as Reporter
- Jo Whiley as herself (voice)
- Laura Linney as Sarah (US release)
- Patrick Dempsey as Sarah’s husband (US release)
- Louise Pentland as Journalist

== Production ==
Shooting began in February 2017, with the film being announced at the same time. The film was broadcast on BBC One as part of Red Nose Day on 24 March 2017. Among the returning cast are Hugh Grant, Keira Knightley, Colin Firth, Liam Neeson, Bill Nighy, Andrew Lincoln, Thomas Sangster, Chiwetel Ejiofor, Marcus Brigstocke and Rowan Atkinson. Actors who did not return included Emma Thompson, Martin Freeman, Joanna Page, Rodrigo Santoro, and Gregor Fisher. Emma Thompson explained her absence from the film: "Richard wrote to me and said, 'Darling, we can't write anything for you because of Alan,' and I said, 'No, of course, it would be sad, too sad,'" referring to the then-recent death of on-screen husband Alan Rickman.

== US version ==
An additional sequence with Laura Linney and Patrick Dempsey was shot after the UK airing, for the US broadcast on NBC on 25 May 2017. It features Linney's character, Sarah, answering her cell phone as if it were her brother calling as in the film, only to reveal the caller is Patrick Dempsey, who remarks that he loves the way she always answers her phone and that she is a wonderful wife, thus giving her character a decidedly happy ending.

The US version also includes alternate versions of the two Rowan Atkinson scenes, set in the US. There are alternate exterior shots of the store he works in, which is now a Walgreens in Midtown Manhattan, replacing the unnamed British store in the original. The US version has Walgreens signage and Red Nose Day banners with the US date, two months later than in the UK, behind Atkinson throughout his scenes. The young actor playing Atkinson's customer speaks slightly different dialogue, with an American accent this time, and Atkinson describes costs in dollars instead of pounds.

The US version also replaces The Beach Boys' 1966 song "God Only Knows" over the opening shots with a cue from Craig Armstrong's score for the original film.
