= It's About Time! (Phineas and Ferb) =

- Phineas and Ferb episode
- Dr. Doofenshmirtz and Perry on the Dr. Feelbetter show. Critics praised Doofenshmirtz's and Perry's relationship in this episode.
- Episode no.: Season 1 Episode 7
- Directed by: Dan Povenmire
- Written by: Dan Povenmire (story); Jon Colton Barry (storyboards); Mike Roth (storyboards); Kent Osborne (storyboards); Aliki Theofilopoulos Grafft (storyboards)
- Production code: 107
- Original air date: March 1, 2008

Episode chronology
← Previous "Tree to Get Ready"	Next → "Jerk De Soleil"
- Phineas and Ferb season 1

"It's About Time!" is the seventh episode and the first half-hour episode, as well as 21st broadcast episode of the first season of the animated television series Phineas and Ferb. It originally aired on Disney Channel on March 1, 2008. The episode concerns stepbrothers Phineas and Ferb fixing a time machine on display in a museum and using it to travel back to prehistoric times. Meanwhile, Perry the Platypus deals with being replaced with a panda bear as the nemesis of the mad scientist Dr. Heinz Doofenshmirtz.

"It's About Time!" was written and directed by series co-creator Dan Povenmire, and storyboards were constructed by multiple artists in the show's production staff. The writers purposely left the time machine available to the boys at the end of the episode in order to reuse it later in the series, which they did in the season 2 episode "Phineas and Ferb's Quantum Boogaloo". Critical reception was generally positive, and multiple reviewers applauded Perry and Doofenshmirtz's relationship in the episode.

== Plot ==
External videos
- It's About Time! S1 E7 Full Episode Phineas and Ferb @disneyxd – Official upload of the episode onto YouTube

Phineas and Ferb attend a museum, where they discover a broken time machine built in the 1880s on display. Endeavoring to travel through time themselves, they begin fixing it to work properly. This catches the attention of Candace. When she finally gets their mother to follow her and view the machine, Linda becomes distracted while Candace continues to walk to the boys, just as their time machine activates. The three are sent back to the Late Cretaceous Period (erroneously stated to be in 300 million B.C.), where a Tyrannosaurus rex immediately destroys the time machine. Now stranded, the three are forced to flee from the T. rex and are eventually saved by a herd of Alamosaurus lounging in a large pond.

Meanwhile, Perry arrives at his lair and sees Major Monogram frozen, meaning Perry is unable to get his mission. Perry then goes to Dr. Doofenshmirtz's hideout, where he discovers Doofenshmirtz has gained a new nemesis in the form of Peter the Panda, a panda bear agent whom he met in Seattle, Washington. Downtrodden, Perry reminisces about previous battles with Doofenshmirtz when he was his nemesis, while Doofenshmirtz himself grows tired of Peter due to him being much less sympathetic than Perry. Perry and Doofenshmirtz decide to appear on the talk show Dr. Feelbetter, where they decide to once more become nemeses; however, Doofenshmirtz reveals that the whole situation was merely a scheme to capture the world's top agents (who are in the audience) and freeze them with a large ray. This results in a large-scale battle where the agents come out victorious.

The boys and Candace return to a muddy area where the T. rex has left a massive footprint, which they recognize will eventually be on display in the museum in the present. Phineas leaves a message in the footprint for Isabella and the Fireside Girls to save them. The girls—in the present—immediately spot the footprint and the message and follow their handbook to create a new time machine. They use the machine to travel back in time and rescue the three. Upon arrival in the present, though, they realize the T. rex returned with them, so Candace flees and tries to expose it to her parents. A stray ray from Doofenshmirtz's machine freezes the creature, so her parents merely believe it is an exhibit.

== Voice cast ==
- Vincent Martella as Phineas Flynn, Teenage Guy
- Ashley Tisdale as Candace Flynn
- Thomas Sangster as Ferb Fletcher
- Caroline Rhea as Linda Flynn-Fletcher
- Richard O’Brien as Lawrence Fletcher, Additional Voices
- Alyson Stoner as Isabella Garcia-Shapiro
- Mitchel Musso as Jeremy Johnson
- Dan Povenmire as Dr. Heinz Doofenshmirtz
- Jeff Swampy Marsh as Major Monogram (Non-speaking cameo), Additional Voices
- Tyler Alexander Mann as Carl
- Dee Bradley Baker as Perry the Platypus, T-Rex, Additional Voices
- Carlos Alazraqui as Dr. Feelbetter, Museum Guard, Additional Voices
- Corey Burton as Additional Voices

== Production ==
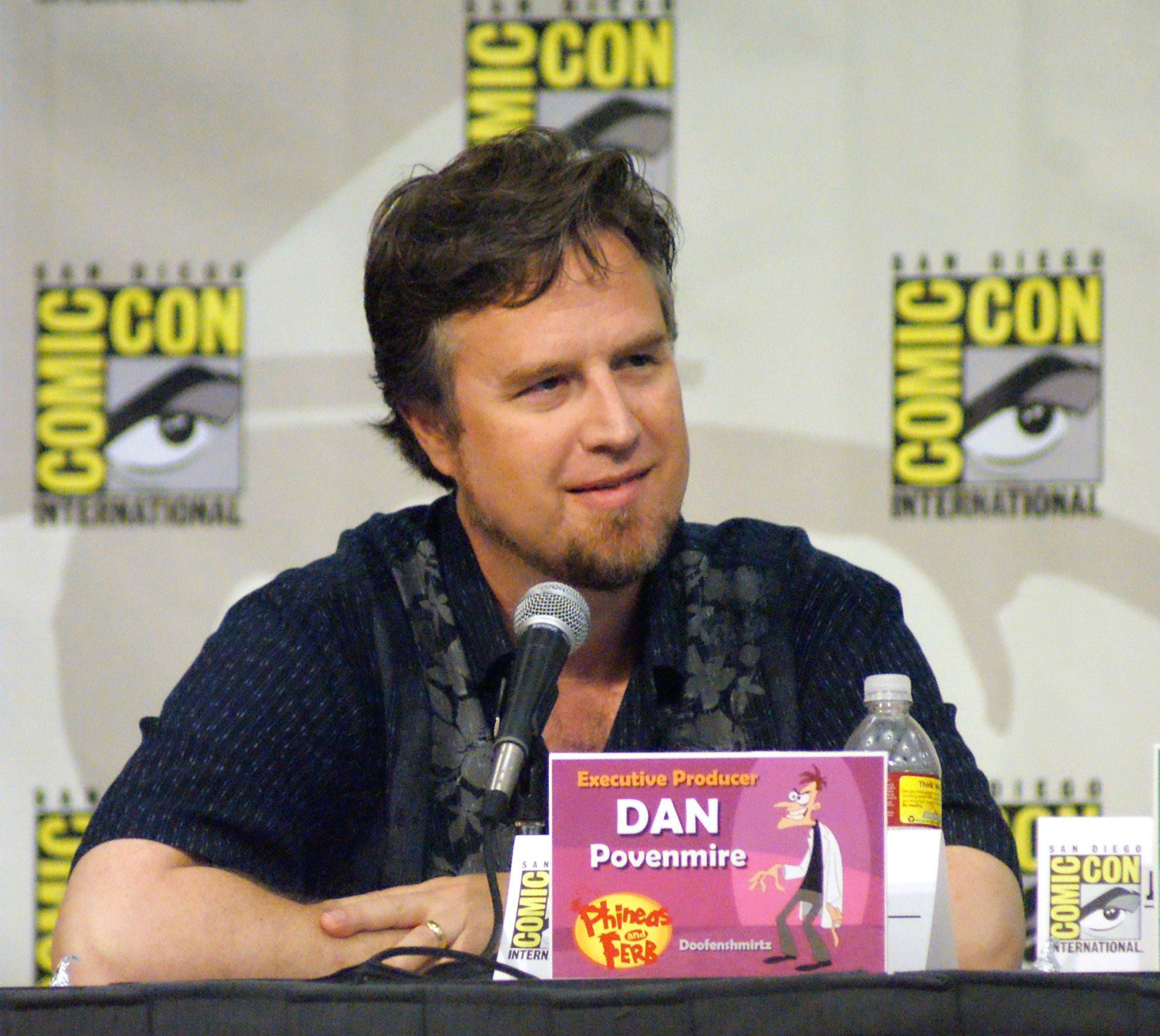
Series co-founder Dan Povenmire wrote and directed "It's About Time!"

"It's About Time!" was conceived by the series' four major writers. At a weekly session that Monday, the concept was reviewed and deemed acceptable enough to create. Series co-founder Dan Povenmire was assigned to develop the script, and simultaneously artists Jon Barry, Mike Roth, Kent Osborne, and Aliki Theofilopoulos constructed the episode's storyboards. A walkthrough of the storyboards was presented to the production staff, whose reaction determined whether certain jokes remained in the finished product. Povenmire directed the episode, which was animated at Rough Draft Studios in South Korea.

In the conclusion of the episode, Phineas and Ferb's time machine is left in positive condition and available for further use at the museum. The writing staff purposely ended it this way so that they could reutilize it later in the series. A concept was eventually conceived as a way to do so, having "Phineas and Ferb go into the future and actually see Candace as an adult (which) drags up all kinds of memories of not being able to bust them." This idea was used for the second-season episode, "Phineas and Ferb's Quantum Boogaloo".

"It's About Time!" featured two different musical numbers, entitled "My Nemesis" and "When We Didn't Get Along". During the storyboard stage, a note was simply made indicating that a song would be placed at a certain point in a sequence. As with most songs in the series, they were each written by series co-creators Povenmire and Jeff "Swampy" Marsh over the course of approximately one hour. Povenmire and Marsh proceeded by singing their draft of the song into the answering machine of the series' composer, Danny Jacob, that Friday night. Jacob performed both of the songs.

The episode was originally broadcast in the United States on the Disney Channel on March 1, 2008. "It's About Time!" became available on the DVD compilation Phineas and Ferb: The Fast and the Phineas in 2008, along with fellow first-season episodes, "One Good Scare Ought to Do It!", "The Fast and the Phineas", "Lawn Gnome Beach Party of Terror", "Flop Starz", "Raging Bully", "Lights, Candace, Action!" and "Are You My Mummy?" Both "My Nemesis" and "When We Didn't Get Along" became available in 2009 on the official Phineas and Ferb soundtrack.

== Themes ==
Multiple critics have noted that the portrayal of Doofenshmirtz and Perry's relationship in the episode features a somewhat of a homosexual subtext. The concept behind it is a parody of stereotypical teen romance film, casting Perry and Doofenshmirtz—two males who are of different species—as the teenage couple who is "breaking up". Perry's initial suspicions over Doofenshmirtz having a new nemesis are portrayed as if a person discovers their significant other is cheating on them. Perry discovers a paw print on Doofenshmirtz's face, resembling a lipstick mark on the cheek as if from a lover, and Peter the Panda emerges from Doofenshmirtz's closet. Doofenshmirtz initially tries to deny having a new nemesis, but eventually admits to the accusation, noting that he "didn't want [Perry] to find out this way," overtly detailing a common way couples discover their partner is cheating on them. Perry is depressed about their "break up" and reminisces about their past "relationship" together, while music resembling a love song plays in the background. After feeling depressed himself, Doofenshmirtz "dumps" Peter and reunites with Perry on a talk show prone to featuring romantic confrontations.

== Cultural references ==
"It's About Time!" features multiple cultural references. Aspects of the time machine are based on H. G. Wells' famous novel The Time Machine. During the "My Nemesis" musical number, caricature of The Archies, a fictional garage band in the animated television series The Archie Show, are shown and begin to sing and play instruments during the course of the sequence. The song itself parodies the style of musician Elvis Costello. The Dr. Feelbetter show incorporates elements of confrontational talk shows Dr. Phil and The Jerry Springer Show.

== Reception ==
The episode was mostly well received by critics. Blogcritics reviewer Aaraon Peck applauded the Perry and Doofenshmirtz B-Plot, considering it as both the official Pret episode and an example of the series' ability to allow "adults [to] enjoy the humor" and not strictly focusing on the entertainment of younger viewers. The production staff reacted positively to the episode, and said that they "really liked" its outcome.

Reaction to the episode's melodies were also positive. Wolfen Moondaughter wrote in her Sequential Tart article, "Five Reasons: Phineas and Ferb," that both "My Nemesis" and "When We Didn't Get Along" were among her personal favorite musical pieces from the series, despite the former resembling the styles of Elvis Costello, whom Moondaughter noted she carried a distaste for. A Wired magazine review of the series' soundtrack observed that despite being drastically different from tracks that proceed and precede it, "When We Didn't Get Along" "fit perfectly" due to "the genius of the malleable songwriting style of Phineas and Ferb's musical brain trust."
