= Jerk De Soleil =

- Phineas and Ferb episode
- Phineas and Ferb host a circus in their backyard.
- Episode no.: Season 1 Episode 8a
- Directed by: Dan Povenmire
- Written by: J. G. Quintel (storyboards); Kim Roberson (storyboards)
- Story by: Bobby Gaylor; Martin Olson
- Production code: 108a
- Original air date: February 10, 2008

Episode chronology
← Previous "It's About Time!"	Next → "Toy to the World"
- Phineas and Ferb season 1

"Jerk De Soleil" is the first half of the eighth episode, as well as the 12th broadcast episode of the first season of the animated television series Phineas and Ferb. In the episode, stepbrothers Phineas and Ferb and their friends host a circus in their backyard, attracting much attention from the neighborhood. The boys' sister, Candace, tries to expose the cirque to her mother while experiencing an allergic reaction to wild parsnips.

"Jerk De Soleil" was written by Bobby Gaylor and Martin Olson, and directed by series co-creator Dan Povenmire, who also provided the voice for Candace during scenes where the character was experiencing an allergic reaction, as the crew was unable to lower the voice of her regular actress, Ashley Tisdale, to the necessary degree. The episode was originally broadcast on February 10, 2008, as part of the special marathon event "Phineas and Ferb-urary". It received generally positive reviews.

== Plot ==
Plans for Phineas, Ferb, and their friends Isabella, Baljeet, Buford, and Django to go to the local circus, "Cirque de lune" are ruined after the performance is canceled due to the ringleader having an allergy after Baljeet comes from his mom's car at the start of the episode. Undeterred, the boys and their friends decide to build their own circus in their backyard and have themselves and their other friends act as performers. The cirque tent is speedily put up, and the group prepare their costumes.

Candace discovers the boys' circus and has set out to tell their mother, when Jeremy stops by to give her a basket of plants. Unfortunately, they include some wild parsnips, which give Candace an allergic reaction: to hide her hives and deep, scratchy voice she dons a sweatsuit and a paper bag before going to the mall to tell Linda about the boys' plans, and then sings E.V.I.L. B.O.Y.S. where Linda and her friend Vivian, Isabella's mother, are.

Exasperated, Candace returns to the circus, where Jeremy has saved a spot for her, only for the boys to mistake her for Buford, whose act is of a mud jumping performance, and include her in his act. She is sent flying through the roof of the tent, just as Doofenshmirtz and Perry are flying overhead. Doofenshmirtz's machine: the Voice-inator, activates, giving everyone in the cirque audience high-pitched voices that cause the tent to rupture. The high velocity of the Voice-inator propels the tent up into the air, destroying the machine and sending Doofenshmirtz flying off (with a high voice). Jeremy gives a CD to Candace, but Candace is not at the house, but Candace then gets the CD from Jeremy.

== Voice cast ==
- Vincent Martella as Phineas Flynn
- Thomas Sangster as Ferb Fletcher
- Ashley Tisdale as Candace Flynn, Mindy
- Alyson Stoner as Isabella Garcia-Shapiro
- Caroline Rhea as Linda Flynn-Fletcher
- Richard O'Brian as Lawrence Fletcher, Additional Voices
- Mitchel Musso as Jeremy Johnson, Additional Voices
- Maulik Pancholy as Baljeet Rai, Additional Voices
- Bobby Gaylor as Buford Van Stomm, Additional Voices
- Dee Bradley Baker as Perry the Platypus, Additional Voices
- Dan Povenmire as Dr. Doofenshmirtz, Candace Flynn (allergy affected), Additional Voices
- Jeff "Swampy" Marsh as Major Monogram, Additional Voices
- Eileen Galindo as Vivian Garcia-Shapiro
- Alec Holden as Django Brown
- Ariel Winter as Additional Voices

== Production ==
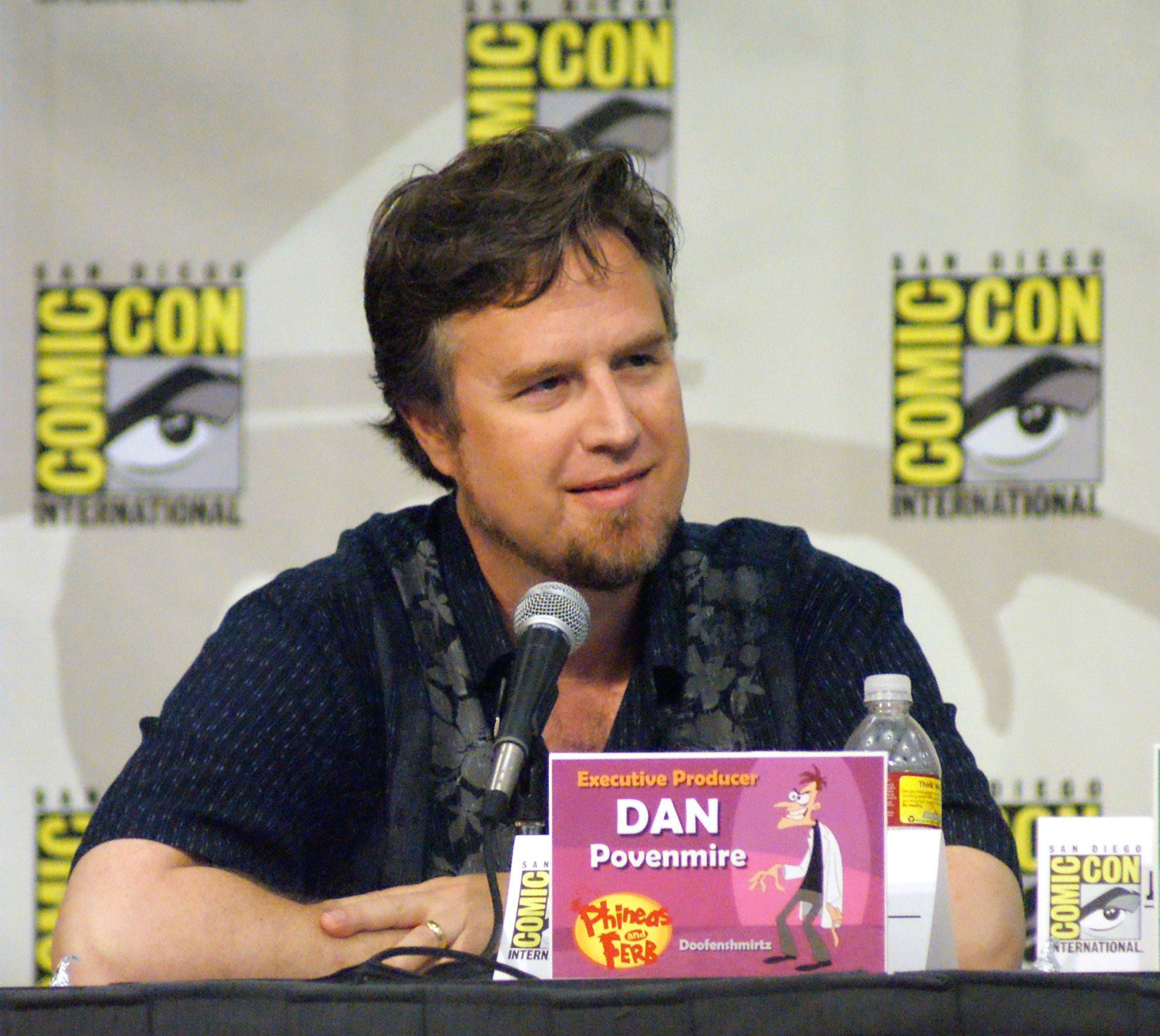
Series co-creator Dan Povenmire directed "Jerk De Soleil" and also provided the voice of Candace on scenes where the character was experiencing an allergic reaction.

"Jerk De Soleil" was written by Bobby Gaylor and Martin Olson. It was storyboarded by J. G. Quintel (the creator of the Cartoon Network series Regular Show), and Kim Roberson, and directed by Phineas and Ferb co-creator Dan Povenmire. The crew was unable to lower the pitch of actress Ashley Tisdale's delivery enough for the scenes in which allergies give Candace a deep voice; instead, Povenmire voiced the character in her place.

"Jerk De Soleil" was originally broadcast in the United States on Disney Channel on February 10, 2008, as part of the special month-long marathon event "Phineas and Ferb-urary." It was released on the DVD compilation The Daze of Summer on its first anniversary, alongside nine other episodes, including the previously unaired "Unfair Science Fair" and "Unfair Science Fair Redux (Another Story)." E.V.I.L. B.O.Y.S. — the episode's featured musical number — became available along with several other songs on the official Phineas and Ferb soundtrack later in 2009.

== Cultural references ==
Phineas and Ferb's elaborate backyard cirque is a parody of Cirque du Soleil, a real-life Canadian traveling company which performs circus arts and street entertainment. The scene where Candace jumps onto the stage and sings about her hardships, mainly concerning her inability to successfully tattle on her brothers, references a scene in the film Adventures in Babysitting (1987) in which Elisabeth Shue's character sings about her hardships similarly.

== Reception ==
"Jerk De Soleil" received generally positive reviews from television critics. The Kidzworld website called Phineas and Ferb's cirque "magical." Writing for DVD Town, reviewer James Plath wrote that the subplot with Doofenshmirtz and Perry "absolutely evokes the old Boris and Natasha plans on Rocky and Bullwinkle." USA Today blogger Whitney Matheson, reviewing the episode, described the entire series as "a short 'toon that zooms all over the place in 15 minutes" and "an animated version of Parker Lewis Can't Lose," calling the writing "clever without being too cute."

The song "E.V.I.L. B.O.Y.S." also received a generally favorable reception. Wired magazine called it an "ever-pleasing blues banger." Fan reaction to the song was also positive, and in the 2009 television event "Phineas and Ferb's Musical Cliptastic Countdown," voters ranked it the series' sixth-best musical feature.
