= Raging Bully =

- Phineas and Ferb episode
- Phineas and Buford have a thumb wrestling competition.
- Episode no.: Season 1 Episode 5a
- Directed by: Dan Povenmire
- Written by: Dan Povenmire (story); Jeff "Swampy" Marsh (story); Martin Olson (story); Wendy Grieb (storyboards); Kent Osborne (storyboards)
- Production code: 105a
- Original air date: February 4, 2008

Guest appearances
- Evander Holyfield as himself; Michael Buffer as the announcer

Episode chronology
| ← Previous "Flop Starz" | Next → "Lights, Candace, Action!" |
- Phineas and Ferb (season 1)

"Raging Bully" is the first half of the fifth episode, as well as the 6th broadcast episode of the animated television series Phineas and Ferb. The episode was originally broadcast on Disney Channel in the United States on February 4, 2008. In the episode, Phineas Flynn is challenged to a thumb wrestling competition at the mall by the local bully, Buford, after he accidentally embarrasses him in the food court. Meanwhile, the evil Dr. Heinz Doofenshmirtz tries using a hypnotic contraption to force everyone to celebrate his birthday and clean up their mess after the party.

"Raging Bully" was written by series co-creators Dan Povenmire and Jeff "Swampy" Marsh and directed by Povenmire. Heavyweight boxing champion Evander Holyfield guest starred as himself, training Phineas for the big thumb-wrestling match. The episode originally broadcast on Disney Channel on February 4, 2008, as part of the month-long special event, "Phineas and Ferb-urary." It received generally positive reviews from television critics and the featured musical number, "He's a Bully," became available on the official Phineas and Ferb soundtrack in 2009.

== Plot summary ==
While at the food court in the mall, Phineas accidentally drops his ice cream cone on bully Buford's pants, causing the whole food court to laugh at Buford. Enraged, he challenges Phineas to a fight right there, but boxing champion Evander Holyfield arrives and convinces them to instead fight in an organized thumb wrestling match later that day, which Buford accepts. Despite being cautioned by Phineas and Ferb's friends Isabella and Baljeet, a nerd who does his homework over the summer because of his low grades, Holyfield trains Phineas through simple tasks, including punching a chain of sausages and playing Dance Dance Revolution.

Meanwhile, Perry the Platypus arrives at an abandoned cake factory, where he is trapped in a vat of cake mix. Dr. Doofenshmirtz, appears and explains that today is his birthday. All throughout his life, his parents never showed up to his birthday parties (even his own birth); now, he plans on using a hypnotic device- "the Slave-inator"- to force everyone to celebrate his birthday. He then rides off with the invention on a flying machine. Perry escapes from the mix and follows after him. In the air, Perry and Doofenshmirtz fight and the machine is activated, but while trying to get Perry to let go of the wall of the flying machine he accidentally makes the machine malfunction, causing the people below to still not want to celebrate his birthday. Doofenshmirtz, defeated, drops the ice cream cone he is eating in the fight and it falls to the ground below.

Finally, the big match commences and Phineas is vigorously beaten by Buford in each round. Candace takes a picture of the match, but it was obscured by her thumb over the lens when she tried to show Linda inside performing a gig. When the final round begins, Buford overpowers Phineas and pulls him up through the air. Just then, Doofenshmirtz's ice cream cone falls and lands on Phineas's head. Buford is satisfied now that Phineas is embarrassed and calls off the match. The audience who was watching cleans up the mess (due to Doofenshmirtz's machine accidentally telling them to) just before Candace comes out with Linda. At the parking lot a few minutes later, Phineas thanks Holyfield for his help and Holyfield walks off. After Buford and Phineas reconcile and form a friendship with each other, Ferb makes a comment which accidentally offends Buford and he is about to be beaten up, but he knocks Buford out with a Vulcan nerve pinch, to Phineas's surprise. When Phineas asks him why he did it he responds, "Well, he was all up in my face."

== Production and release ==
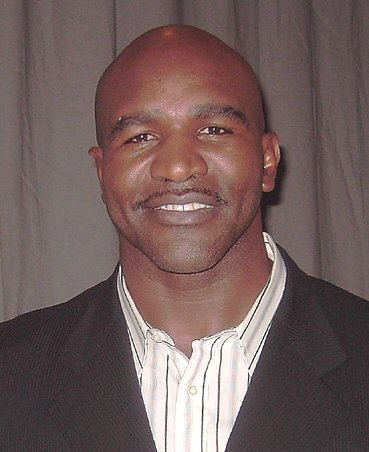
Evander Holyfield guest starred in the episode as himself.

"Raging Bully" was written by Phineas and Ferb co-creators Dan Povenmire and Jeff "Swampy" Marsh. It was storyboarded by artists Wendy Grieb and Kent Osbourne and was directed by Povenmire, who managed the bulk of animation direction in the series along with Zac Moncrief.

Heavyweight boxing champion Evander Holyfield guest starred in the episode as himself, appearing at the mall to help train Phineas for the big thumb wrestling match against Buford. Holyfield's guest performance was heavily expected since the original announcement of guest stars lined up for the series released in September 2007.

It was originally broadcast in the United States on February 4, 2008, on Disney Channel with a TV-G parental rating. It was part of the network's marathon event "Phineas and Ferb-urary," which debuted new episodes of the series every night for the entire month. In 2008, "Raging Bully" became available on the DVD compilation Phineas and Ferb: The Fast and the Phineas, along with fellow first season episodes of the series "One Good Scare Ought to Do It!" "Lawn Gnome Beach Party of Terror," "The Fast and the Phineas," "Are You My Mummy?" "Flop Starz," "Lights, Candace, Action!" and "It's About Time!" In 2009, the episode's song, "He's a Bully," became available on the official Phineas and Ferb soundtrack.

== Reception ==
"Raging Bully" received generally positive reviews from television critics. DVD Talk's David Cornelius stated that he enjoyed Holyfield's guest appearance. Ed Liu, of Toon Zone, wrote that the episode and others included on the DVD The Fast and the Phineas were "way too manic for their own good, never giving a gag enough time to develop a proper laugh before ripping off to the next one," but considered Phineas's "He's a Bully" training montage to be one of the series' "amusing video sequences." A Wired magazine review for the soundtrack said that the "He's a Bully" was "butt-rock," but blended nicely with other melodies of completely different genres.
