= Phineas and Ferb: Across the 1st and 2nd Dimensions =

Soundtrack album by Cast – Phineas and Ferb
- Released: August 4, 2011
- Recorded: 2009–2011
- Genres: Soundtrack; soul; hip hop; R&B; funk; pop; doo-wop; pop rock; sunshine pop; jazz; bubblegum pop; pop punk; alternative rock; alternative metal; show tune; patter song; musical; Children's
- Length: 40:05
- Labels: Hollywood; Walt Disney
- Producers: Dan Povenmire; Danny Jacob; Jeff "Swampy" Marsh

Cast – Phineas and Ferb chronology
Phineas and Ferb Holiday Favorites (2010)	Phineas and Ferb: Across the 1st and 2nd Dimensions (2011)	Phineas and Ferb-ulous: The Ultimate Album (2011)

Phineas and Ferb: Across the 1st and 2nd Dimensions is the soundtrack for the television film Phineas and Ferb the Movie: Across the 2nd Dimension based on the Disney Channel television series, Phineas and Ferb. The album was released by Walt Disney Records and Hollywood Records on August 4, 2011 and featured eight original songs written for the film and fourteen songs from the second season of the show. Most of them were performed by the cast members. In addition, the album featured Guns N' Roses' lead guitarist Slash performing the track "Kick It Up a Notch" with the cast. Slash further appeared in an animated version of himself in the film, with a music video featuring the animated performance of the song was released on July 20.

The album was further accompanied by, Phineas and Ferb the Movie: Across the 2nd Dimension Song Sampler, a digital soundtrack sampler on the film's digital copy disc that included with the film's home media release on August 23, 2011. It featured twenty-one songs from the film excluding "Kick It Up a Notch". A Walmart edition of the soundtrack featured over ten more songs from the television series.

== Track listing ==
Standard edition
No.	Title	Writer(s)	Artist(s)	Length
1.	"Everything's Better With Perry"	Aliki Theofilopoulos, Antoine Guilbaub, Dan Povenmire, Danny Jacob, Jeff "Swampy" Marsh and Martin Olson	Robbie Wyckoff	1:46
2.	"Perfect Day"	Dan Povenmire, Jeff "Swampy" Marsh, Martin Olson and Michael Gerard Culross Jr.	Danny Jacob	1:15
3.	"Hey Ferb"	Dan Povenmire, Jeff "Swampy" Marsh and Martin Olson	Vincent Martella	1:27
4.	"Brand New Best Friend"	Dan Povenmire, Jon Colton Barry and Martin Olson	Dan Povenmire	2:18
5.	"You're Going Down"	Dan Povenmire, Jon Colton Barry and Martin Olson	Ashley Tisdale	1:12
6.	"What 'Cha Doin'?"	Dan Povenmire, Jeff "Swampy" Marsh and Michael Gerard Culross Jr.	Alyson Stoner	1:18
7.	"Summer (Where Do We Begin?)"	Dan Povenmire, Jeff "Swampy" Marsh, Jon Colton Barry, Martin Olson and Robert Forrest Hughes	Vincent Martella	2:43
8.	"Perry, the Platypus"	Dan Povenmire, Danny Jacob, James Bernstein and Jeff "Swampy" Marsh	Randy Crenshaw	2:53
9.	"Takin' Care of Things"	Dan Povenmire, Danny Jacob and Jeff "Swampy" Marsh	Dan Povenmire and Danny Jacob	0:57
10.	"Not Knowing Where You're Going"	Jon Colton Barry, Martin Olson and Robert William Gaylor Jr.	Jeff "Swampy" Marsh	1:29
11.	"Brand New Reality"	Dan Povenmire, James Bernstein, Jeff "Swampy" Marsh, Jon Colton Barry and Martin Olson	Robbie Wyckoff	1:27
12.	"There's a Platypus Controlling Me"	Dan Povenmire, Jeff "Swampy" Marsh and Martin Olson	Dan Povenmire	1:19
13.	"Mysterious Force"	Martin Olson	Ashley Tisdale	1:33
14.	"My Ride From Outer Space"	Dan Povenmire, Jeff "Swampy" Marsh and Jon Colton Barry	Danny Jacob	1:43
15.	"Come Home Perry"	Aliki Theofilopoulos, Dan Povenmire, Danny Jacob, Jeff "Swampy" Marsh, Martin Olson and Robert Forrest Hughes	Vincent Martella and Ashley Tisdale	2:03
16.	"Back In Gimmelshtump"	Dan Povenmire, Danny Jacob and Martin Olson	Dan Povenmire	1:14
17.	"When You Levitate"	Dan Povenmire, Jeff "Swampy" Marsh and Martin Olson	Carmen Carter	1:00
18.	"You're Not Ferb"	Joseph Gilbert Orrantia and Martin Olson	Danny Jacob	1:03
19.	"Robot Riot"	Dan Povenmire, Jaret Reddick, Jeff "Swampy" Marsh and Martin Olson	Jaret Reddick, Carlos Alazraqui and Steve Zahn	3:17
20.	"Rollercoaster"	Dan Povenmire, Jeff "Swampy" Marsh, Jon Colton Barry, Martin Olson, Robert William Gaylor Jr. and Scott Peterson	Vincent Martella	2:18
21.	"Carpe Diem"	Dan Povenmire, Jeff "Swampy" Marsh and Martin Olson	Vincent Martella	1:50
22.	"Kick It Up A Notch"	Dan Povenmire, Danny Jacob, Jeff "Swampy" Marsh and Saul Hudson	Vincent Martella and Dan Povenmire feat. Slash	4:06
Total length:				40:05

Walmart exclusive edition
No.	Title	Writer(s)	Artist(s)	Length
23.	"A-G-L-E-T"	Jon Colton Barry	Vincent Martella	1:36
24.	"Happy Evil Love Song"	Dan Povenmire and Jon Colton Barry	Dan Povenmire and Sheena Easton	1:43
25.	"Not So Bad A Dad"	Dan Povenmire, Jon Colton Barry, Martin Olson and Robert Forrest Hughes	Olivia Olson	1:07
26.	"When Will He Call Me?"	Dan Povenmire, Jeff "Swampy" Marsh, Martin Olson and Robert Forrest Hughes	Sheena Easton	0:59
27.	"Spa Day"	Aliki Theofilopoulos, Dan Povenmire, Danny Jacob, Jeff "Swampy" Marsh, Martin Olson and Robert Forrest Hughes	Danny Jacob	1:05
28.	"Candace Party"	Dan Povenmire, Jeff "Swampy" Marsh, Martin Olson and Kaz Prapuolenis	Ashley Tisdale	1:16
29.	"Gimme A Grade"	Dan Povenmire, Jon Colton Barry and Martin Olson	Maulik Pancholy	1:43
30.	"X-Ray Eyes"	Dan Povenmire, Martin Olson, Sherm Cohen and Chong Lee	Dan Povenmire	1:29
31.	"Hemoglobin Highway"	Dan Povenmire, Jeff "Swampy" Marsh and Martin Olson	Danny Jacob	0:51
32.	"Watchin' And Waitin'"	Dan Povenmire, Jeff "Swampy" Marsh, Martin Olson and Michael Culross Jr.	Vincent Martella	1:52
Total length:				53:46

== Commercial performance ==
Across the 1st and 2nd Dimensions debuted at number 69 on Billboard 200, number three on Billboard's Soundtracks chart. It further rose up to number 57, the following week before dropping down to 73 as of September 3, 2011. Similarly, by the following week of August 27, the album ranked dropped at the Soundtracks Chart and Kids chart respectively, though it managed to stay for the consequent weeks.

== Charts ==
=== Weekly charts ===
Chart (2011)	Peak position
Mexican Albums (AMPROFON)	92
Spanish Albums (Promusicae)	23
US Billboard 200	57
US Kid Albums (Billboard)	4
US Soundtrack Albums (Billboard)	3

=== Year-end charts ===
Chart (2011)	Position
US Kid Albums (Billboard)	24
