= Olivia Olson =

American actress and singer-songwriter (born 1992)

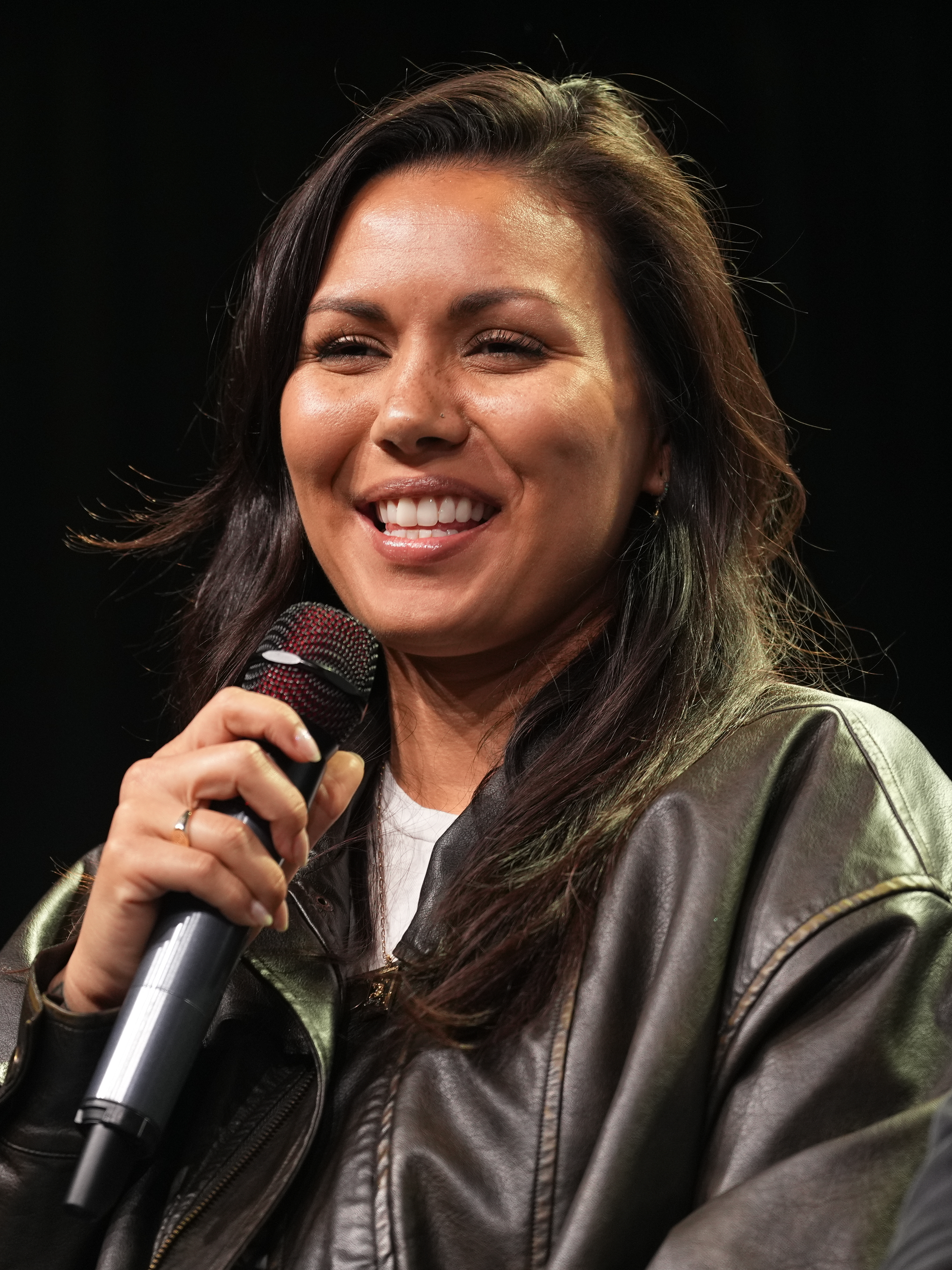
- Olson at GalaxyCon Oklahoma City in 2024
- Born: May 21, 1992 (age 34); Los Angeles, California, U.S.
- Occupations: Actress; singer; songwriter; screenwriter
- Years active: 2003–present
- Father: Martin Olson
- Musical career
- Genres: Acoustic; R&B; pop
- Instruments: Vocals; piano; guitar; bass
- Label: RoseGold

Olivia Olson (born May 21, 1992) is an American actress, singer-songwriter, and screenwriter, largely known for her voice roles as Vanessa Doofenshmirtz in Phineas and Ferb and Marceline the Vampire Queen in Adventure Time. She also played the character of Joanna in the 2003 film Love Actually and its 2017 short sequel Red Nose Day Actually.

Along with this, she is also a writer, having written the Boom! Studios graphic novel Marcy and Simon, co-authored Adventure Time: The Enchiridion and Marcy's Super-Secret Scrapbook, and contributed writing to the best-seller Adventure Time Encyclopedia for Cartoon Network. In 2023, she began writing for the Phineas and Ferb revival.

== Early life ==
Olson was adopted at birth and raised in Los Angeles, California. She lives with her father, Martin Olson, mother Kay Olson, and brother Casey Olson. Olson graduated from Agoura High School in 2010. She is of Afro-Jamaican descent through her biological father.

== Career ==
Olson has appeared as a singer and actress on television shows and in live theatre, including Comedy Central Stage, the HBO Theater, and The Fake Gallery.

=== 2003: Love Actually ===
Olson moved into the mainstream with her role as Joanna Anderson in the 2003 holiday film Love Actually, singing the song "All I Want for Christmas Is You". Her singing was praised, with director Richard Curtis stating in the commentary in the music section of the Love Actually DVD that Olson's singing was so perfect, they were afraid the audience would not believe that a ten-year-old could really sing the way she did and would assume she was lip-synching. They had to train her so her singing would sound more believable, and add the sounds of inhalations to the track. This led to guest spots on The Ellen Show, The Tracy Morgan Show and singing with stars Jack Black and Kristin Chenoweth. Olson also posted original songs on her YouTube account. In 2017, Olson reprised her role as Joanna in Red Nose Day Actually, a short film which is a sequel to Love Actually.

=== 2008–2017: Phineas and Ferb, and Beauty Is Chaos ===
From 2008 to 2015, Olson voiced the recurring character Vanessa Doofenshmirtz in the Disney animated series Phineas and Ferb along with actor Thomas Sangster (Ferb Fletcher), who played Joanna's love interest Sam in Love Actually. Olson said that she and Sangster talked "about the whole Ferb-Vanessa situation 'cause it's pretty funny."

In Phineas and Ferb, she sings a number of songs, including the duet "Busted!" with Ashley Tisdale as well as popular solo songs, including "I'm Me", "Not So Bad a Dad", "I'm Lindana and I Wanna Have Fun", "Happy New Year" and many others, including her song in the Phineas and Ferb Christmas Vacation special "Got That Christmas Feeling". She has written songs for Phineas and Ferb and has written and recorded her own songs with music producers Rick Nowels, Camara Kambon and Hollywood jazz great Rob Mullins, while Olson's father wrote "over 200 songs for the series" and various episodes. In 2011, Olson voiced Vanessa in a deleted scene of Phineas and Ferb the Movie: Across the 2nd Dimension, which included a musical number, but sang a song for the film "I Walk Away".

Her role as Vanessa led to her role as Marceline the Vampire Queen in Adventure Time. During the show's production, the show creator, Pendleton Ward, contacted Olson's father, Martin Olson, then writing for Phineas and Ferb, asking if he knew who played Vanessa in the show. He was not aware, at the time, that Martin was Olson's father. She would also voice Marceline in the 2012 video game, Adventure Time: Hey Ice King! Why'd You Steal Our Garbage?!!.

Olson posts original music on her YouTube and TikTok account. On July 18, 2013, Olson released her debut EP Beauty Is Chaos. By December 2015, she had over 19,000 followers on her YouTube channel.

=== 2013–2018: Adventure Time, Steven Universe, and Phineas and Ferb ===
In 2010, Olson got the role of Marceline the Vampire Queen on the animated Cartoon Network series Adventure Time. Olson said she was impressed by her character's fashion design and the costuming for Marceline, saying she occasionally admired the unique designs for the character in episodes. During the audition for the role, Olson first read for Princess Bubblegum, but later read for Marceline. Reportedly when getting into character for the role she often dressed similar to Marceline when she recorded her lines In the show, her father played Hunson Abadeer, the father of Marceline. In the series, Olson also sings Marceline's songs, which were written by storyboard artists, or other people affiliated with production. As such, The Guardian praised Marceline as a character, noting in particular that "she's ... responsible for some of the show's best songs."

The series was a commercial and popular success and her character attracted positive critical attention from critics, and fans alike, along with the production crew of Adventure Time. This popularity was even recognized by the company that owns Adventure Time with the official press release for the Adventure Time: Marceline and the Scream Queens companion comic book referring to Marceline as a "fan-favorite". Olson later said she was "honored" to be voicing a character in a show pushing the limits, including on "what a female character in a TV series brings to the table."

In the Adventure Time mini-series "Stakes", Olson performs the popular song "Everything Stays", which was revealed by Olson and Rebecca Sugar at the 2015 San Diego Comic-Con. In 2015 Olivia and her father, Martin Olson, co-authored a book adapted from the series Adventure Time, Adventure Time: The Enchiridion & Marcy's Super Secret Scrapbook. Olivia wrote her section in first person as her character Marceline. The book was illustrated by artists including Mahendra Singh, Tony Millionaire, Renee French, Celeste Moreno and Sean Tejaratchi.

Olson also performed the song "Haven't You Noticed (I'm a Star)", which was featured on the September 17, 2015, episode of Steven Universe entitled "Sadie's Song".

It was later featured in the Steven Universe mini-episode "Gem Karaoke", released on October 3, 2016. She appears at Comic-Cons and pop conventions around the world as do other Adventure Time cast members.

From 2016 to 2019, Olivia voiced the fourth Powerpuff Girl Bliss on Cartoon Network's reboot of The Powerpuff Girls, The character's initial announcement was met with negative reactions from some fans, but when rumors began to spread that the character would be black, fans began to express a more optimistic tone. Reviewers later called the character a great step forward in terms of racial diversity and a good addition. Reactions to the character were mainly positive, while others argued she was a stereotype and that the inclusion of the character seemed like tokenism.

=== 2018–present: Nowhere Land, The X Factor, Adventure Time, and Phineas and Ferb ===
On June 22, 2018, Olson released the album Nowhere Land. She worked with K-pop producers Kairos Music Group and producer/singer/songwriter John Defeo on the project. In October 2019, she began competing in The X Factor: Celebrity, being the second act to be evicted from the live shows on October 26, 2019. She also voiced several characters in Fast & Furious: Spy Racers, in 2019, specifically, Jun and PizzaRave.

Olson reprised her role as Marceline the Vampire Queen in Adventure Time: Distant Lands, which aired from 2020 to 2021, and later in the first season of the Adventure Time spin-off series Adventure Time: Fionna and Cake, which aired in 2023. In the "Obsidian" episode of 'Adventure Time: Distant Lands, entitled "Obsidian", she sang "Woke Up" and "Monster" with other performers.

In 2020, she reprised the role of Vanessa Doofenshmirtz in the 2020 film Phineas and Ferb the Movie: Candace Against the Universe. In the film, Olson sang the song "The Universe Is Against Me" with Ashley Tisdale, who voiced Candace, and Laura Dickinson. In 2023, it was revealed that she would be a writer for the Phineas and Ferb revival, in addition to reprising her role as Vanessa. This was later confirmed in June 2025 by Entertainment Weekly, after the fifth season of the Phineas and Ferb revival began.

== Discography ==
=== Studio albums ===
List of studio albums, with selected information
Title	Details
The Father-Daughter Album of Unspeakable Beauty (with Martin Olson)	Released: 2013; Label: Self-released; Formats: CD
Nowhere Land	Released: June 22, 2018; Label: RoseGold; Formats: Digital download, streaming

=== Extended plays ===
List of extended plays, with selected information
Title	Details
Beauty Is Chaos	Released: July 18, 2013; Label: Self-released; Formats: Digital download, streaming

=== Singles ===
Title	Year	Album
"Anyone Who Had a Heart" X Factor Recording)	2019	Non-album singles
"Crows"	2021	Non-album singles
"Darkroom" (for Inanimate Insanity)	2026	Non-album singles

=== Soundtrack appearances ===
- Love Actually (2003)
- Phineas and Ferb (2009)
- Phineas and Ferb Holiday Favorites (2010)
- Phineas and Ferb the Movie: Across the 2nd Dimension (2011)
- Phineas and Ferb: Across the 1st and 2nd Dimensions (2011)
- Phineas and Ferb: Summer Belongs to You (2012)
- Phineas and Ferb-ulous: The Ultimate Album (2013)
- Phineas and Ferb: Rockin' and Rollin' (2013)
- The Music of Ooo (2016)
- Marceline the Vampire Queen – Rock the Nightosphere (2015)
- Steven Universe, Vol. 1 (Original Soundtrack) (2017)
- Adventure Time – Come Along with Me (Original Soundtrack) (2018)
- Adventure Time, Vol. 1 (Original Soundtrack) (2019)
- Adventure Time, Vol. 2 (Original Soundtrack) (2019)
- Adventure Time, Vol. 3 (Original Soundtrack) (2019)
- Adventure Time – The Complete Series Soundtrack (2019)
- Adventure Time: Distant Lands – Obsidian (Original Soundtrack) (2020)

== Filmography ==
=== Film ===
Year	Show	Role	Notes
2003	Love Actually	Joanna Anderson	
2011	Phineas and Ferb the Movie: Across the 2nd Dimension	Vanessa Doofenshmirtz	Voice; deleted scene
2020	Phineas and Ferb the Movie: Candace Against the Universe	Vanessa Doofenshmirtz	Voice

=== Television ===
Year	Show	Role	Notes
2004	The Tracy Morgan Show	Julia	Episode: "Career Day"
2006	Zoey 101	Girl #1	Episode: "Broadcast Views"
2008–2015, 2025–present	Phineas and Ferb	Vanessa Doofenshmirtz, additional voices	Voice, also writer in the revival
2010–2018	Adventure Time	Marceline the Vampire Queen, additional voices	Voice
2017–2019	Milo Murphy's Law	Vanessa Doofenshmirtz, additional voices	Voice.
2017–2019	The Powerpuff Girls	Blisstina Utonium	Voice, 4 episodes
2017	Red Nose Day Actually	Joanna	
2019	The X Factor: Celebrity	Herself / Contestant	
2019–2021	Fast & Furious Spy Racers	Jun, additional voices	9 episodes
2020	Adventure Time: Distant Lands	Marceline the Vampire Queen	Voice, episode: "Obsidian"
2020	Robot Chicken	Mal, Yellow Power Ranger, Emily Elizabeth	Voice, episode: "Sundancer Craig in: 30% of the Way to Crying"
2023	We Baby Bears	Ursa Major	Voice, episode: "Little Fallen Star"
2023–present	Adventure Time: Fionna and Cake	Marceline the Vampire Queen	Voice, 9 episodes
2026	Adventure Time: Side Quests	Marceline the Vampire Queen	Voice
2026	Inanimate Insanity	Tapey	Singing voice

=== Video games ===
Year	Title	Role
2012	Adventure Time: Hey Ice King! Why'd You Steal Our Garbage?!!	Marceline
2013	Adventure Time: Explore the Dungeon Because I Don't Know!	Marceline
2015	Adventure Time: Finn & Jake Investigations	Marceline, Huntress
2015	Lego Dimensions	Marceline
2018	Adventure Time: Pirates of the Enchiridion	Marceline, Candy Person
2020	Chex Quest HD	Wheatney Chexworth
2021	Fast & Furious Spy Racers: Rise of SH1FT3R	PizzaRave
2024	Multiversus	Marceline
