= Phineas and Ferb (soundtrack) =

Soundtrack album by Cast – Phineas and Ferb
- Released: September 22, 2009
- Recorded: 2007–2009
- Genres: Children's; soundtrack; pop; dance-pop; pop rock; teen pop
- Length: 38:04
- Labels: Disney Channel; Walt Disney; Hollywood

Cast – Phineas and Ferb chronology
Phineas and Ferb (2009)	Phineas and Ferb Christmas Vacation! (2009)

Phineas and Ferb is the first soundtrack album for the Disney Channel television series Phineas and Ferb, which was released September 22, 2009, in the United States by Disney Channel Records, Walt Disney Records and Hollywood Records. The album contains 26 songs from season one. It also contains the bonus track "The F-Games" that can only be heard online.

As of March 6, 2010, the soundtrack had sold about 122,600 copies in the United States.

== Background ==
The artists on the soundtrack all are in Phineas and Ferb except for Bowling for Soup who performs the theme tune for the series. The song "Gitchee Gitchee Goo" performed by Vincent Martella, Hayden Panettiere and Ashley Tisdale featured in the episode "Flop Starz", was also included in the 2009 album Disney Channel Playlist.

=== Release ===
The original report cited that the initial release date of February 10, 2009, had been pushed back to August 4. On June 26, 2009, the release date was pushed back to September 22, 2009. Later this has been confirmed on the official website. The soundtrack was released in the United Kingdom on October 10, 2009, via EMI Music.

== Track listing ==
No.	Title	Writer(s)	Performer(s)	Length
1.	"Today is Gonna Be a Great Day"	Dan Povenmire, Jeff "Swampy" Marsh, Michael Culross, Michael Walker, Carl Williams	Bowling for Soup	3:01
2.	"Gitchee Gitchee Goo"	Dan Povenmire, Jeff "Swampy" Marsh, Jon Colton Barry	Vincent Martella, Ashley Tisdale, Laura Dickinson, Danny Jacob	1:58
3.	"Backyard Beach"	Dan Povenmire, Danny Jacob	Danny Jacob	0:47
4.	"Busted"	Dan Povenmire, Jeff "Swampy" Marsh, Martin Olson, Jon Colton Barry, Antoine Guilbaud, Danny Jacob	Ashley Tisdale, Olivia Olson	1:38
5.	"Perry the Platypus Theme"	Dan Povenmire, Jeff "Swampy" Marsh	Randy Crenshaw, Laura Dickinson, Danny Jacob	0:47
6.	"S.I.M.P. (Squirrels in My Pants)"	Dan Povenmire, Jeff "Swampy" Marsh, Martin Olson, Michael Culross	Robbie Wyckoff, Danny Jacob, Ashley Tisdale	1:34
7.	"I'm Lindana and I Wanna Have Fun"	Dan Povenmire, Jeff "Swampy" Marsh, Jon Colton Barry, Chris Headrick	Olivia Olson	0:51
8.	"My Nemesis"	Dan Povenmire, Jeff "Swampy" Marsh, Bobby Gaylor, Kent Osborne	Danny Jacob	1:02
9.	"My Goody Two-Shoes Brother"	Dan Povenmire, Jeff "Swampy" Marsh, Martin Olson, Bobby Gaylor, Danny Jacob	Dan Povenmire	1:15
10.	"Disco Miniature Golfing Queen"	Dan Povenmire, Jeff "Swampy" Marsh, Martin Olson, Danny Jacob	Laura Dickinson and Danny Jacob	1:15
11.	"My Undead Mummy and Me"	Dan Povenmire, Jeff "Swampy" Marsh, Martin Olson, Bobby Gaylor, Danny Jacob	Danny Jacob	1:06
12.	"I Love You Mom"	Dan Povenmire, Jeff "Swampy" Marsh, Martin Olson	Ashley Tisdale	1:03
13.	"Ready for the Bettys"	Dan Povenmire, Jeff "Swampy" Marsh, Martin Olson, Danny Jacob, Aliki Theofilopoulos	Olivia Olson	1:01
14.	"When We Didn't Get Along"	Dan Povenmire, Jeff "Swampy" Marsh, Martin Olson, Bobby Gaylor, Jon Colton Barry, Danny Jacob	Danny Jacob	1:40
15.	"He's a Bully"	Dan Povenmire, Jeff "Swampy" Marsh, Martin Olson, Bobby Gaylor, Danny Jacob	Robbie Wyckoff	1:12
16.	"Truck Drivin' Girl"	Dan Povenmire, Jeff "Swampy" Marsh, Martin Olson, Bobby Gaylor, Michael Diederich, Danny Jacob	Danny Jacob	1:15
17.	"Do Nothing Day"	Jon Colton Barry	Mitchel Musso, Ashley Tisdale	1:39
18.	"E.V.I.L. B.O.Y.S."	Dan Povenmire, Jeff "Swampy" Marsh, Martin Olson, Bobby Gaylor	Dan Povenmire	1:51
19.	"Fabulous"	Chris Headrick, Dan Povenmire, Jeff "Swampy" Marsh, Bobby Gaylor, Martin Olson	Carlos Alazraqui, Vincent Martella	1:29
20.	"Little Brothers"	Jon Colton Barry	Laura Dickinson (with Danny Jacob)	1:15
21.	"Let's Take a Rocketship to Space"	Dan Povenmire, Jeff "Swampy" Marsh, Martin Olson, Bobby Gaylor, Danny Jacob	Danny Jacob	1:05
22.	"Queen of Mars"	Dan Povenmire, Jeff "Swampy" Marsh, Jon Colton Barry	Ashley Tisdale	1:22
23.	"Chains on Me"	Dan Povenmire, Jeff "Swampy" Marsh, Martin Olson	Dan Povenmire	1:33
24.	"Phinedroids and Ferbots"	Aliki Theofilopoulos, Dan Povenmire, Jeff "Swampy" Marsh, Bobby Gaylor, Martin Olson	Danny Jacob	1:08
25.	"Ain't Got Rhythm"	Robert Hughes, Danny Jacob, Jeff "Swampy" Marsh, Martin Olson, Dan Povenmire	Steve Zahn, Vincent Martella	2:16
26.	"You Snuck Your Way Right into My Heart"	Chris Headrick, Dan Povenmire, Jon Colton Barry, Martin Olson	Jaret Reddick	2:35
Total length:				37:37

== Charts ==
Chart	Peak position
Polish Albums Chart	6
Spanish Albums Chart	4
U.S Billboard 200	59

Year End Chart	Peak position
Spanish Albums Chart	35

Certifications	Certification
Spanish Albums Chart	Gold

== Release dates ==
Country	Date	Label	Format	Catalog
United States	September 22, 2009	Disney Channel Records; Walt Disney Records; Hollywood Records	CD	
Canada & Australia	September 22, 2009	Disney Channel Records; Walt Disney Records; Hollywood Records	CD	
United Kingdom	October 10, 2009	EMI	CD	688 5232
Singapore & Malaysia	September 30, 2009	Warner Music Singapore; Universal Music Singapore	CD/VCD	
Argentina	July 17, 2010	Walt Disney Records Argentina	CD	

== Other releases ==
Several other soundtracks for the series have been released.

- Phineas and Ferb Christmas Vacation: A soundtrack for the Christmas special, only released digitally in December 2009.
- Disney Karaoke Series: Phineas and Ferb: A karaoke CD re-release of the series' soundtrack, released on March 30, 2010.
- Phineas and Ferb: Summer Belongs to You!: A soundtrack for the one-hour special, released on August 3, 2010. It was released on a CD on May 21, 2012.
- Phineas and Ferb Holiday Favorites: Contains 7 songs from Phineas and Ferb's Christmas Vacation, 8 Christmas carols sung by Phineas and Ferb characters, and a song that was cut from the special for time ("What Does He Want?"), released on September 21, 2010.
- Phineas and Ferb: Across the 1st and 2nd Dimensions: Contains songs from Phineas and Ferb the Movie: Across the 2nd Dimension, and various episodes from Season 2 of the show, such as Rollercoaster: The Musical!, released on August 2, 2011.
- Phineas and Ferb-ulous: The Ultimate Album: A CD/DVD combo pack that was released in the UK, August 16, 2011. Also contains the songs from Summer Belongs to You!.
- Phineas and Ferb the Movie: Across the 2nd Dimension Song Sampler: A digital soundtrack on the digital copy disc of Phineas and Ferb the Movie: Across the 2nd Dimension, included with the DVD release of the movie. It contains all songs from the movie, with the exception of "Kick It Up a Notch."
- Phineas and Ferb: Rockin' and Rollin': A digital album featuring songs mostly from seasons 3 and 4 with some songs from the first two seasons that were not released before.
- Phineas and Ferb: Star Wars: Contains 5 songs from the special of the same name.
- Phineas and Ferb: Last Day of Summer: Features all songs from the last episode and some songs from the special Night of the Living Pharmacists. This album also features the theme song from the O.W.C.A. Files special.
- Phineas and Ferb the Movie: Candace Against the Universe: Contains songs from the movie of the same name, a song that was cut for time ("Step into the Great Unknown"), and four score cues, released on August 28, 2020.
- Phineas and Ferb: Season 5: Contains songs from the fifth season, released on June 6, 2025.
- Phineas and Ferb Halloween Hits: Contains three songs from the fifth season, plus two songs from the sixth, released on October 30, 2026. As the title implies, all these songs are Halloween-themed.
