= List of Phineas and Ferb guest stars =

This is a list of guest stars who have appeared on the Disney animated musical comedy television series, Phineas and Ferb. Per Academy of Television Arts & Sciences guidelines, individuals appearing in more than half of a given season's episodes will be considered "recurring" and will not be included on the list.

== Season 1 ==
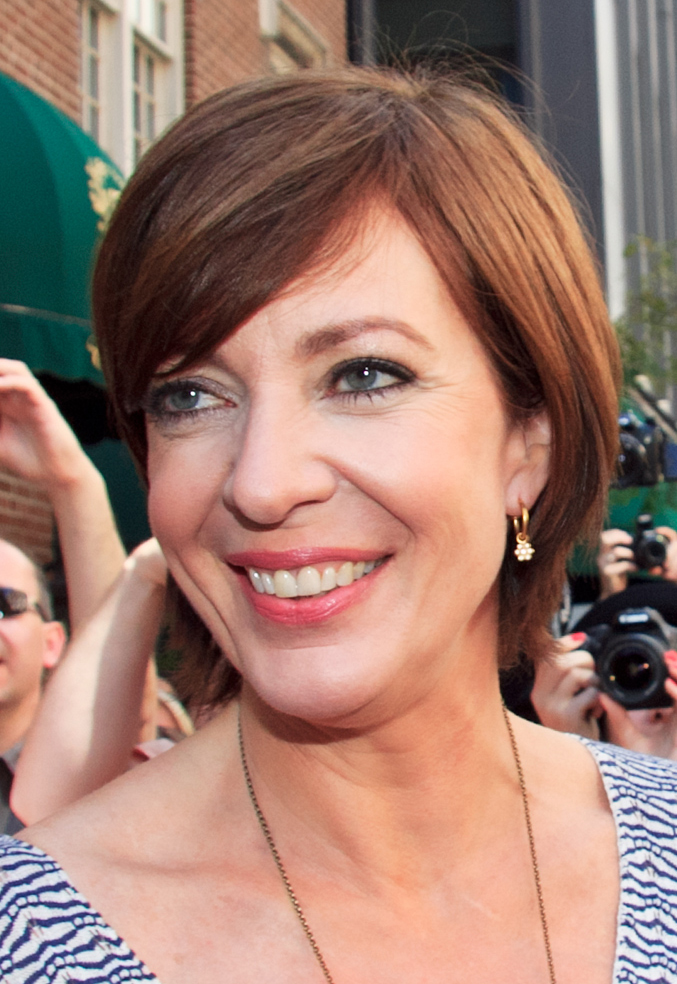
Oscar-winning actress Allison Janney makes her first of nine appearances as Dr. Doofenshmirtz's ex-wife Charlene in Season 1.

Name	Role(s)	Episode
Keone Young	Queen Wahini crowner	"Lawn Gnome Beach Party of Terror"; Episode 2
Jeff Bennett	Ben Baxter	"Flop Starz"; Episode 3
Brian Phelps	Announcer Rick	"The Fast and the Phineas"; Episode 4
Mark Thompson	Announcer Dave	"The Fast and the Phineas"; Episode 4
Michael Buffer	Announcer	"Raging Bully"; Episode 6
Evander Holyfield	Himself	"Raging Bully"; Episode 6
French Stewart	Gaston Le Mode	"Run Away Runaway"; Episode 9
Lucy Davis	Crash	"Ready for the Bettys"; Episode 14
Allison Janney	Charlene Doofenshmirtz	"I Scream, You Scream"; Episode 15
Ming-Na Wen	Dr. Hirano	"I Scream, You Scream"; Episode 15
J. K. Simmons	J.B.	"Toy to the World"; Episode 16
April Winchell	Bridgette Oshinomi	"Toy to the World"; Episode 16
Barry Bostwick	Grandpa Clyde	"Get That Bigfoot Outta My Face!"; Episode 17
Sandra Oh	Doofenshmirtz's girlfriend	"Get That Bigfoot Outta My Face!"; Episode 17
Billy Ray Cyrus	Buck Buckerson	"It's a Mud, Mud, Mud, Mud World"; Episode 18
Allison Janney	Charlene Doofenshmirtz	"It's a Mud, Mud, Mud, Mud World"; Episode 18
Carlos Alazraqui	Dr. Feelbetter	"It's About Time!"; Episode 21
Carlos Alazraqui	Bobbi Fabulous	"Dude, We're Getting the Band Back Together"; Episode 22
Susanne Blakeslee	The Love-a-gram	"Dude, We're Getting the Band Back Together"; Episode 22
John DiMaggio	Johnny "Love on the Run" guy	"Dude, We're Getting the Band Back Together"; Episode 22
Jaret Reddick	Danny	"Dude, We're Getting the Band Back Together"; Episode 22
Steve Zahn	Sherman "Swampy"	"Dude, We're Getting the Band Back Together"; Episode 22
Jeff Bennett	Talking Zebra	"The Ballad of Badbeard"; Episode 24
Barry Bostwick	Grandpa Clyde	"The Ballad of Badbeard"; Episode 24
Vicki Lewis	Lulu	"Leave the Busting to Us"; Episode 26
Gwendoline Yeo	Fifi	"Leave the Busting to Us"; Episode 26
Barry Bostwick	Grandpa Clyde	"Crack That Whip"; Episode 27
Vicki Lawrence	Hildegard	"Crack That Whip"; Episode 27
Diedrich Bader	Vance Ward	"The Best Lazy Day Ever"; Episode 28
John DiMaggio	Conk	"Boyfriend from 27,000 B.C."; Episode 29
Jane Carr	Grandma Winnie	"A Hard Day's Knight"; Episode 31
Tim Curry	Stubbings; Dr. Lloyd Wexler	"A Hard Day's Knight"; Episode 31
Malcolm McDowell	Grandpa Reg	"A Hard Day's Knight"; Episode 31
Dominic Wood	Charles	"A Hard Day's Knight"; Episode 31
Jess Harnell	Shady Joe	"Bowl-R-Ama Drama"; Episode 33
April Winchell	Shopkeeper	"Got Game?"; Episode 34
Phil LaMarr	Street Performer #1	"Comet Kermillian"; Episode 35
Charlie Schlatter	Street Performer #2	"Comet Kermillian"; Episode 35
Rob Paulsen	Scottsman	"Put That Putter Away"; Episode 36
Rob Paulsen	Mad Scientist	"Does This Duckbill Make Me Look Fat?"; Episode 37
Ming-Na Wen	Dr. Hirano	"Does This Duckbill Make Me Look Fat?"; Episode 37
Jane Carr	Grandma Winnie	"The Flying Fishmonger"; Episode 38
Malcolm McDowell	Grandpa Reg	"The Flying Fishmonger"; Episode 38
Jane Carr	Grandma Winnie	"The Monster of Phineas-n-Ferbenstein"; Episode 40
Greg Ellis	Jameson	"The Monster of Phineas-n-Ferbenstein"; Episode 40
Malcolm McDowell	Grandpa Reg	"The Monster of Phineas-n-Ferbenstein"; Episode 40
Jennifer Grey	Dr. Gevaarlijk	"Oil on Candace"; Episode 41
Joel Grey	Beppo	"Oil on Candace"; Episode 41
John DiMaggio	Pinhead Pierre	"Out of Toon"; Episode 42
Allison Janney	Charlene Doofenshmirtz	"Hail Doofania!"; Episode 43
Keith Ferguson	Ronaldo; Gretchen's countdown voice	"Out to Launch"; Episode 44
Brian George	Bouncer	"Out to Launch"; Episode 44
Lara Jill Miller	Sylvia	"Out to Launch"; Episode 44
Jeff Bennett	Talking Zebra	"Phineas and Ferb Get Busted"; Episode 45
Clancy Brown	Drill Sergeant	"Phineas and Ferb Get Busted"; Episode 45
Geraldo Rivera	Morty Williams	"Phineas and Ferb Get Busted"; Episode 45
Brenda Song	Wendy	"Unfair Science Fair"; Episode 46
Brian Stepanek	Mr. McGillicuddy; Mr. Slushy Burger manager	"Unfair Science Fair"; Episode 46
Kari Wahlgren	Baking soda volcano girl	"Unfair Science Fair"; Episode 46
Tom Kenny	Scientist	"Unfair Science Fair Redux (Another Story)"; Episode 47
Brian Stepanek	Mr. Slushy Burger manager	"Unfair Science Fair Redux (Another Story)"; Episode 47

== Season 2 ==
Name	Role(s)	Episode
John Larroquette	Bob Webber	"The Lake Nose Monster"; Episode 1
Tara Strong	Little girl	"The Lake Nose Monster"; Episode 1
Tom Kenny	The Squirrel	"Interview with a Platypus"; Episode 2
Tara Strong	The Bird	"Interview with a Platypus"; Episode 2
Keith Ferguson	Announcer from "Flawless Girl"	"Attack of the 50 Foot Sister"; Episode 4
Kevin Michael Richardson	P.P. Otter	"Attack of the 50 Foot Sister"; Episode 4
April Winchell	Blanca Dishon	"Attack of the 50 Foot Sister"; Episode 4
Keith Ferguson	Herman	"Backyard Aquarium"; Episode 5
April Winchell	Bridgette Oshinomi	"Backyard Aquarium"; Episode 5
Clancy Brown	The Gelatin Monster	"Day of the Living Gelatin"; Episode 6
Jane Leeves	Admiral Acronym	"Day of the Living Gelatin"; Episode 6
Jane Carr	Grandma Winnie	"Elementary, My Dear Stacy"; Episode 7
Jane Leeves	Inspector Initials	"Elementary, My Dear Stacy"; Episode 7
Damian Lewis	Agent Double O-O	"Elementary, My Dear Stacy"; Episode 7
Malcolm McDowell	Grandpa Reg	"Elementary, My Dear Stacy"; Episode 7
Sheena Easton	Doofenshmirtz's date	"Chez Platypus"; Episode 9
Corey Burton	Documentary narrator	"Perry Lays an Egg"; Episode 10
Kari Wahlgren	Elizabeth	"Perry Lays an Egg"; Episode 10
Don LaFontaine	Movie voice over announcer	"The Chronicles of Meap"; Episode 12
Lorenzo Lamas	Meap	"The Chronicles of Meap"; Episode 12
David Mitchell	Mitch	"The Chronicles of Meap"; Episode 12
Danny Cooksey	Thaddeus	"Thaddeus and Thor"; Episode 13
Allison Janney	Charlene Doofenshmirtz	"Thaddeus and Thor"; Episode 13
Cloris Leachman	Dr. Doofenshmirtz's mother	"Thaddeus and Thor"; Episode 13
Jaret Reddick	Danny	"Thaddeus and Thor"; Episode 13
Aliki Theofilopoulos	Mandy	"Thaddeus and Thor"; Episode 13
Shae Brewster	Nicolette	"De Plane! De Plane!"; Episode 14
Cloris Leachman	Dr. Doofenshmirtz's mother	"De Plane! De Plane!"; Episode 14
Corbin Bleu	Coltrane	"Let's Take a Quiz"; Episode 15
Clancy Brown	The Regurgitator	"Oh, There You Are, Perry"; Episode 17
Jennifer Stone	Woman with a pet beaver	"Oh, There You Are, Perry"; Episode 17
Tiya Sircar	Mishti	"That Sinking Feeling"; Episode 20
Meera Syal	Baljeet's mother	"That Sinking Feeling"; Episode 20
Corbin Bleu	Coltrane	"The Baljeatles"; Episode 21
Jennifer Stone	The Mailwoman	"No More Bunny Business"; Episode 23
April Winchell	Forewoman	"Spa Day"; Episode 24
Moises Arias	Fred	"Phineas and Ferb's Quantum Boogaloo"; Episode 25
Bowling for Soup	Themselves	"Phineas and Ferb's Quantum Boogaloo"; Episode 25
Jennifer Grey	Librarian	"Phineas and Ferb's Quantum Boogaloo"; Episode 25
Noah Munck	Xavier	"Phineas and Ferb's Quantum Boogaloo"; Episode 25
Jennifer Stone	Amanda	"Phineas and Ferb's Quantum Boogaloo"; Episode 25
Jane Leeves	Admiral Acronym	"Isabella and the Temple of Sap"; Episode 28
Judd Nelson	The Guru	"Isabella and the Temple of Sap"; Episode 28
Amanda Plummer	Professor Poofenplotz	"Isabella and the Temple of Sap"; Episode 28
Cloris Leachman	Eliza M. Feyersied	"Fireside Girl Jamboree"; Episode 30
Allison Janney	Charlene Doofenshmirtz	"Finding Mary McGuffin"; Episode 32
Candi Milo	Sally	"Finding Mary McGuffin"; Episode 32
Jane Carr	Grandma Winnie	"Picture This"; Episode 33
Malcolm McDowell	Grandpa Reg	"Picture This"; Episode 33
Jane Leeves	Nikki Stars	"Nerdy Dancin'"; Episode 34
Big Bad Voodoo Daddy	Themselves	"Phineas and Ferb Christmas Vacation"; Episode 37
Corey Burton	WJOP worker	"Phineas and Ferb Christmas Vacation"; Episode 37
Jane Carr	Grandma Winnie	"Phineas and Ferb Christmas Vacation"; Episode 37
Bill Fagerbakke	Frosty the Snowman	"Phineas and Ferb Christmas Vacation"; Episode 37
Mathew Horne	Blay'n	"Phineas and Ferb Christmas Vacation"; Episode 37
Bruce Mackinnon	Clewn't	"Phineas and Ferb Christmas Vacation"; Episode 37
Malcolm McDowell	Grandpa Reg	"Phineas and Ferb Christmas Vacation"; Episode 37
Clancy Brown	Santa Claus	"Phineas and Ferb Christmas Vacation"; Episode 37
Ariel Winter	Wendy Stinglehopper	"Phineas and Ferb Christmas Vacation"; Episode 37
John Schneider	Wilbur Wilkins	"Just Passing Through"; Episode 38
Tom Wopat	Orville Wilkins	"Just Passing Through"; Episode 38
Megan Hilty	Aunt Tiana	"Candace's Big Day"; Episode 39
John Larroquette	Uncle Bob	"Candace's Big Day"; Episode 39
Jaret Reddick	Danny	"Hip Hip Parade"; Episode 43
Adam Wylie	Buford's new nerd	"Hip Hip Parade"; Episode 43
Pamela Adlon	Buford's mother	"Not Phineas and Ferb"; Episode 46
Diedrich Bader	Albert	"Not Phineas and Ferb"; Episode 46
Jennifer Grey	Baljeet's mother	"Not Phineas and Ferb"; Episode 46
Amber Valletta	Mrs. DuBois	"Not Phineas and Ferb"; Episode 46
Ming-Na Wen	Dr. Hirano	"Robot Rodeo"; Episode 49
Pamela Adlon	Melanie	"The Beak"; Episode 50
Ben Stiller	Khaka Peü Peü	"The Beak"; Episode 50
Christine Taylor	Mrs. Khaka Peü Peü	"The Beak"; Episode 50
Pamela Adlon	Melanie	"She's the Mayor"; Episode 51
Laird Hamilton	Himself	"Phineas and Ferb Hawaiian Vacation"; Episode 53
Phill Lewis	Hotel manager	"Phineas and Ferb Hawaiian Vacation"; Episode 53
Allie MacKay	Yoga instructor	"Phineas and Ferb Hawaiian Vacation"; Episode 53
Clay Aiken	Himself	"Phineas and Ferb: Summer Belongs To You!"; Episode 54
Brian George	Uncle Sabu	"Phineas and Ferb: Summer Belongs To You!"; Episode 54
Chaka Khan	Herself	"Phineas and Ferb: Summer Belongs To You!"; Episode 54
Lauren Tom	Bāchan Hirano	"Phineas and Ferb: Summer Belongs To You!"; Episode 54
Diedrich Bader	Albert	"Nerds of a Feather"; Episode 55
Jeff Bennett	The Talking Zebra	"Nerds of a Feather"; Episode 55
Seth MacFarlane	Jeff McGarland	"Nerds of a Feather"; Episode 55
Kevin Smith	Clive Addison	"Nerds of a Feather"; Episode 55
Kari Wahlgren	"Ducky Momo" vendor	"Nerds of a Feather"; Episode 55
Romi Dames	Bridgette Oshinomi	"The Secret of Success"; Episode 59
Diedrich Bader	Albert	"The Doof Side of the Moon"; Episode 60
Allison Janney	Charlene Doofenshmirtz	"Brain Drain"; Episode 62
Logan Miller	Johnny	"Brain Drain"; Episode 62
Corbin Bleu	Coltrane	"Rollercoaster: The Musical!"; Episode 63
Lorenzo Lamas	Meap	"Rollercoaster: The Musical!"; Episode 63
Kenny Ortega	Himself	"Rollercoaster: The Musical!"; Episode 63
Sophia Bush	Sara	"Candace Gets Busted"; Episode 65

== Season 3 ==
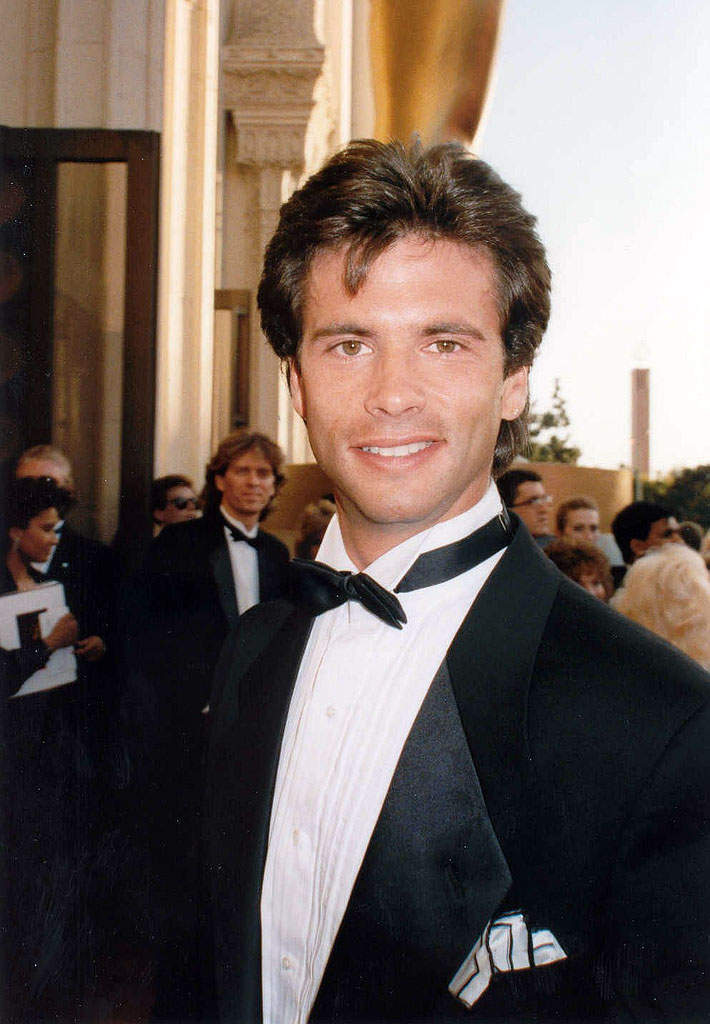
Soap opera star Lorenzo Lamas returns for his third and fourth times as the alien, Meap, during season 3.

Name	Role(s)	Episode
Andrés Cantor	Spanish announcer	"The Great Indoors"; Episode 1
Erik Estrada	Juan	"The Great Indoors"; Episode 1
Jane Lynch	Mrs. Johnson	"Canderemy"; Episode 2
Tina Fey	Annabelle Johnson	"Run, Candace, Run"; Episode 3
Vicki Lawrence	Hildegard Johnson	"Run, Candace, Run"; Episode 3
Jane Lynch	Mrs. Johnson	"Run, Candace, Run"; Episode 3
Todd Stashwick	Mr. Johnson	"Run, Candace, Run"; Episode 3
Barry Bostwick	Grandpa Clyde	"Last Train to Bustville"; Episode 4
Joan Cusack	Glenda Wilkins	"Last Train to Bustville"; Episode 4
John Schneider	Wilbur Wilkins	"Last Train to Bustville"; Episode 4
Tom Wopat	Orville Wilkins	"Last Train to Bustville"; Episode 4
Pamela Adlon	Buford's mother	"Phineas' Birthday Clip-O-Rama!"; Episode 5
April Winchell	Construction lady	"Phineas' Birthday Clip-O-Rama!"; Episode 5
Nick Frost	Captain Squint	"The Belly of the Beast"; Episode 6
Corey Burton	The Super-Computer	"Ask a Foolish Question"; Episode 8
Lisa Ling	Tykera Kwok	"Misperceived Monotreme"; Episode 9
Joel McHale	Norm head prototype	"Candace Disconnected"; Episode 10
John DiMaggio	Pinhead Pierre	"Magic Carpet Ride"; Episode 11
Jane Lynch	Mrs. Johnson	"Bad Hair Day"; Episode 12
Davy Jones	Nigel	"Meatloaf Surprise"; Episode 13
Peter Noone	Adrian	"Meatloaf Surprise"; Episode 13
Jamie Oliver	Himself	"Meatloaf Surprise"; Episode 13
Greg LeMond	Himself	"Tour de Ferb"; Episode 18
Logan Miller	Johnny	"Skiddley Whiffers"; Episode 19
Darren Bent	Sniffleton Nostrils player #2	"My Fair Goalie"; Episode 20
Jane Horrocks	Eliza	"My Fair Goalie"; Episode 20
Phill Jupitus	Adrian Fletcher	"My Fair Goalie"; Episode 20
Gary Lineker	Sniffleton Nostrils player #1	"My Fair Goalie"; Episode 20
Helen McCrory	Lucy Fletcher	"My Fair Goalie"; Episode 20
Daniel Roche	Beckham with half-moon glasses	"My Fair Goalie"; Episode 20
Tom Bergeron	"L.O.V.E.M.U.F.F.I.N." host	"Bullseye!"; Episode 21
Michael Douglas	Waylon	"That's the Spirit!"; Episode 22
Tom Kenny	Jack-O-Lantern	"That's the Spirit!"; Episode 22
April Winchell	Mona; Bridgette Oshinomi	"That's the Spirit!"; Episode 22
Michael J. Fox	Michael	"The Curse of Candace"; Episode 23
Danny Jacob	Narrator	"The Curse of Candace"; Episode 23
Stephen Moyer	Jared	"The Curse of Candace"; Episode 23
Anna Paquin	Kristen	"The Curse of Candace"; Episode 23
Carol Kane	Nana Shapiro	"Lotsa Latkes"; Episode 25
Kelly Clarkson	Herself	"A Phineas and Ferb Family Christmas"; Episode 27
Carlos Alazraqui	Bobbi Fabulous	"Tri-Stone Area"; Episode 28
John DiMaggio	Conk	"Tri-Stone Area"; Episode 28
Robert F. Hughes	Old Phineas	"Doof Dynasty"; Episode 29
Allison Janney	The Lady of the Lake	"Excaliferb!"; Episode 30
Amanda Plummer	Keeper of the Bridge of Comprehension	"Excaliferb!"; Episode 30
Eric Bauza	Li'l Saul	"The Remains of the Platypus"; Episode 34
Diedrich Bader	Tom Totally	"Perry the Actorpus"; Episode 36
Richard Kind	Totally Tools executive	"Perry the Actorpus"; Episode 36
George Takei	Positive reinforcement machine	"Perry the Actorpus"; Episode 36
Jane Lynch	Mrs. Johnson; Liar #1	"Let's Bounce"; Episode 37
Todd Stashwick	Mr. Johnson	"Let's Bounce"; Episode 37
Daran Norris	Abe Lincoln robot	"Let's Bounce"; Episode 37
Jennifer Grey	Svetka	"The Doonkelberry Imperative"; Episode 40
John Hodgman	Zengle	"The Doonkelberry Imperative"; Episode 40
Jeff Foxworthy	Southern Meap	"Meapless in Seattle"; Episode 41
Lorenzo Lamas	Meap	"Meapless in Seattle"; Episode 41
David Mitchell	Mitch	"Meapless in Seattle"; Episode 41
Carlos Alazraqui	Bobbi Fabulous	"Delivery of Destiny"; Episode 42
Simon Pegg^{S}	Paul the delivery guy	"Delivery of Destiny"; Episode 42
Brian Phelps	Paul's dad	"Delivery of Destiny"; Episode 42
Jaret Reddick	Danny	"Delivery of Destiny"; Episode 42
Christian Slater	Paul the delivery guy	"Delivery of Destiny"; Episode 42
Mark Thompson	Radio DJ	"Delivery of Destiny"; Episode 42
Steve Zahn	Sherman "Swampy"	"Delivery of Destiny"; Episode 42
Barry Bostwick	Grandpa Clyde	"Buford Confidential"; Episode 43
Matthew Lillard	"additional voices"	"Buford Confidential"; Episode 43
Danica McKellar	Josette; Collette	"Buford Confidential"; Episode 43
Jorge Garcia	Rodrigo	"Minor Monogram"; Episode 47
Seth Green	Monty Monogram	"Minor Monogram"; Episode 47
Ray Liotta	Himself	"What A Croc!"; Episode 48
Guy Fieri	Pizza guy	"Sci-Fi Pie Fly"; Episode 50
Seth Green	Flomby	"Sci-Fi Pie Fly"; Episode 50
Rob Paulsen	Romantic man from the TV	"Sci-Fi Pie Fly"; Episode 50
Seth Green	Monty Monogram	"Sipping with the Enemy"; Episode 51
Jennifer Hale	Female customer	"Sipping with the Enemy"; Episode 51
Mikey Kelley	Cashier; Male customer #4	"Sipping with the Enemy"; Episode 51
Tim Curry	Worthington DuBois	"Tri-State Treasure: Boot of Secrets"; Episode 52
Mikey Kelley	Announcer	"Tri-State Treasure: Boot of Secrets"; Episode 52
Rob Morrow	Flea market salesman	"Tri-State Treasure: Boot of Secrets"; Episode 52
Jonathan Ross^{J}	Flea market salesman	"Tri-State Treasure: Boot of Secrets"; Episode 52
Gareth Cliff	Flea market salesman	"Tri-State Treasure: Boot of Secrets"; Episode 52
Alan Tudyk	Salesman #2	"Tri-State Treasure: Boot of Secrets"; Episode 52
Kelli Gates	Judge	"Norm Unleashed"; Episode 54
Lorraine Kelly^{LK}	Judge	"Norm Unleashed"; Episode 54
Barry Bostwick	Grandpa Clyde	"Where's Perry?"; Episodes 55/56
Edi Gathegi	Ignatius Ukareamü	"Where's Perry?"; Episodes 55/56
Lenny Henry^{LH}	Ignatius Ukareamü	"Where's Perry?"; Episodes 55/56
Harold Perrineau	Maître d'	"Where's Perry?"; Episodes 55/56
Vanessa L. Williams^{†}	Flight attendant	"Where's Perry?"; Episodes 55/56
Lorenzo Lamas	Meap	"Ferb TV"; Episode 57
Grey DeLisle	Lady on the bus	"Road to Danville"; Episode 60
Allison Janney	Charlene Doofenshmirtz	"This Is Your Backstory"; Episode 61
Cloris Leachman	Dr. Doofenshmirtz's mother	"This Is Your Backstory"; Episode 61

^{S}Although voiced by Christian Slater in the United States and Canada, for the United Kingdom and Ireland airings of the episode, Simon provided the voice for "Paul the delivery guy".
^{J}Although voiced by Rob Morrow in the United States and Canada, and Gareth Cliff in South Africa, for the United Kingdom and Ireland airings of the episode, Jonathan provided the voice for the "flea market salesman".
^{LK}Although voiced by Kelli Gates in the United States and Canada, for the United Kingdom and Ireland airings of the episode, Lorraine provided the voice for the "judge".
^{LH}Although voiced by Edi Gathegi in the United States and Canada, for the United Kingdom and Ireland airings of the episode, Lenny provided the voice for "Ignatius Ukareamü".
^{†}Vanessa only appears in "Part One" of the two part episode.

== Season 4 ==
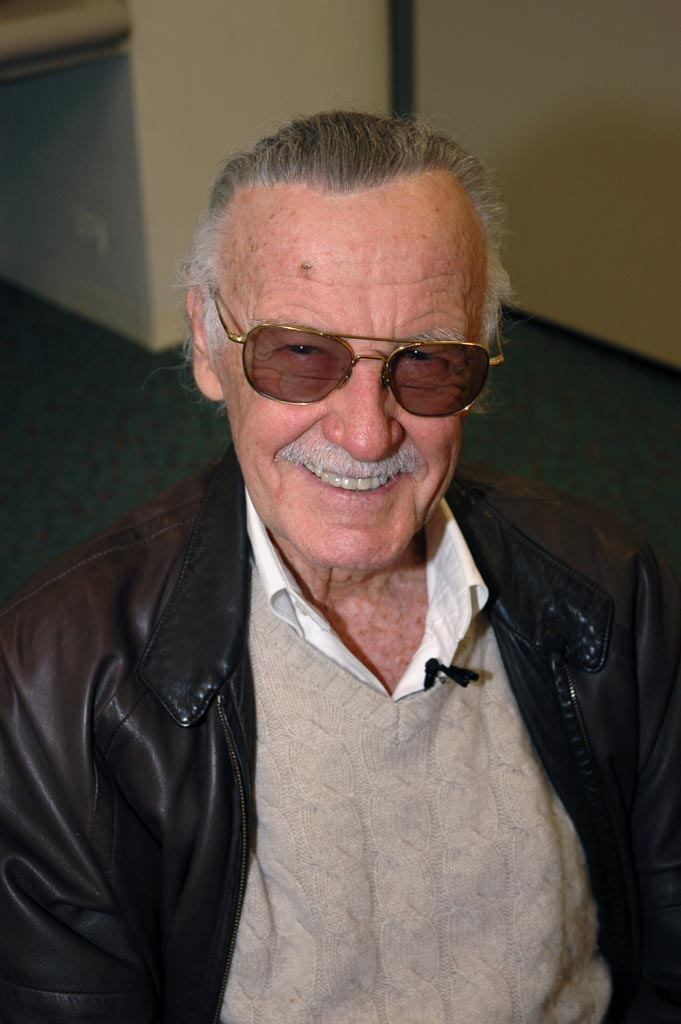
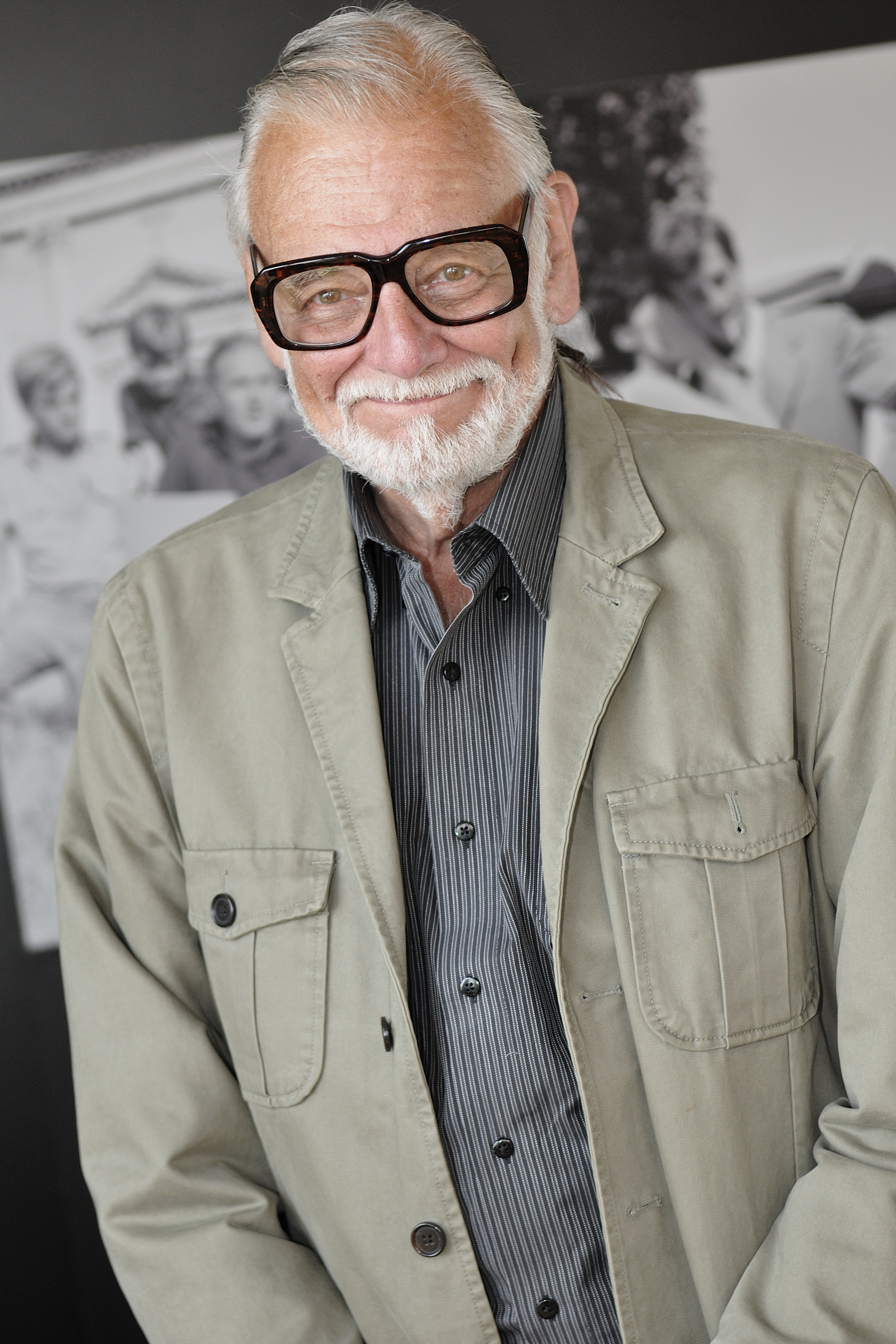
Superhero icon Stan Lee and horror icon George A. Romero each make an appearance during the final season.

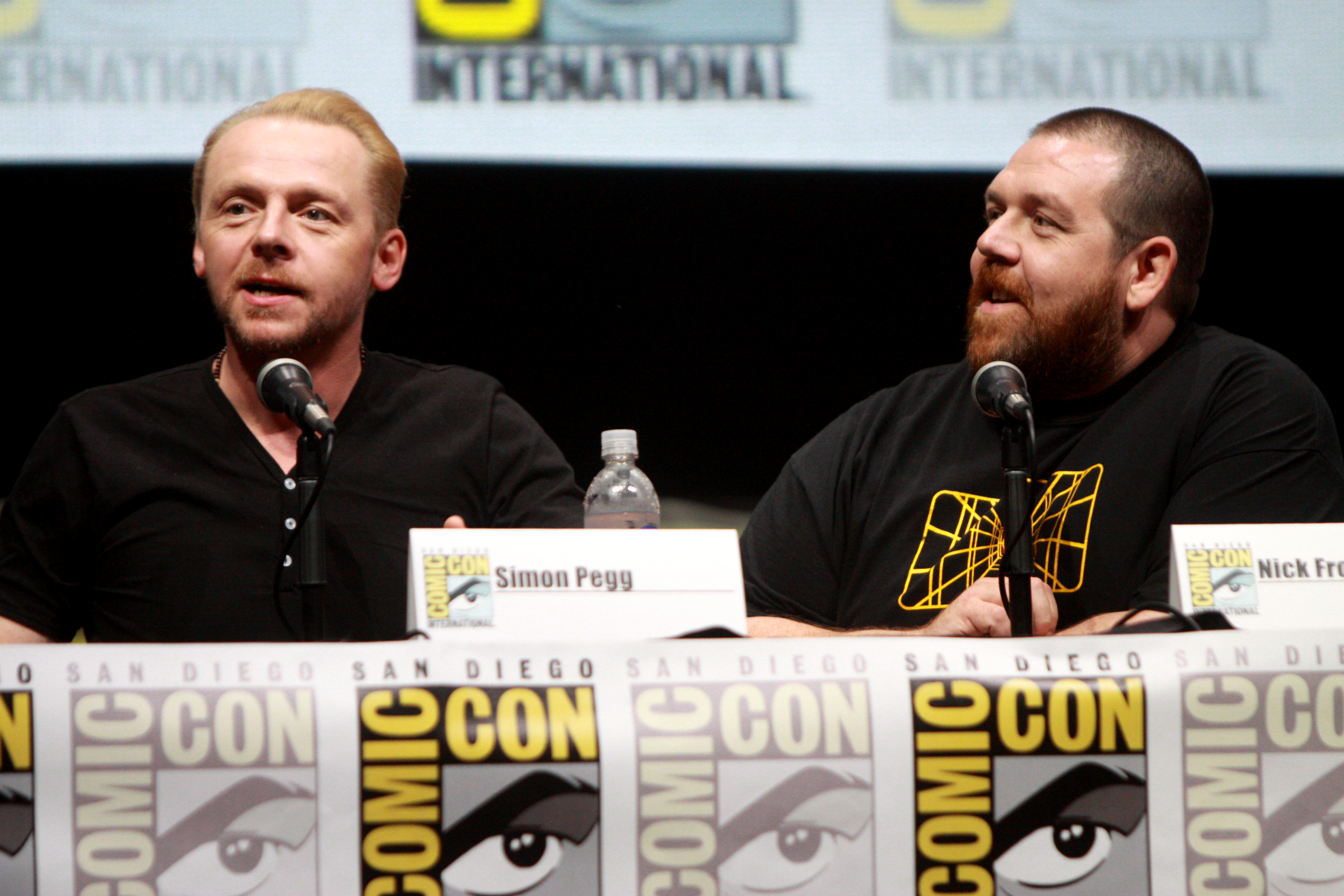
Simon Pegg and Nick Frost reprise their roles as Shaun and Ed from the 2004 comedy horror film, Shaun of the Dead in the 44th episode of the fourth season.

Name	Role(s)	Episode
Luc Robitaille	Himself	"For Your Ice Only"; Episode 1
Martin Olson	Human head fly	"Fly on the Wall"; Episode 3
Jennifer Grey	Baljeet's mother	"My Sweet Ride"; Episode 5
Jane Lynch	Mrs. Johnson	"My Sweet Ride"; Episode 5
Pamela Adlon	Melanie	"Der Kinderlumper"; Episode 6
Cloris Leachman	Dr. Doofenshmirtz's mother	"Der Kinderlumper"; Episode 6
Samantha Bee	Lyla Loliberry	"Sidetracked"; Episode 7
Kevin McDonald	Prof. Bannister	"Sidetracked"; Episode 7
Deborra-Lee Furness	Liam's mum	"Primal Perry"; Episode 8
Jesse Spencer	Liam McCracken	"Primal Perry"; Episode 8
Carlos Alazraqui	Morg	"Mind Share"; Episode 9
Lorenzo Lamas	Meap	"Mind Share"; Episode 9
Jaime Pressly	Rosie	"Mind Share"; Episode 9
Parry Gripp	Himself	"Backyard Hodge Podge"; Episode 10
Allison Janney	Charlene Doofenshmirtz	"Bee Day"; Episode 11
Jennifer Hale	Carla	"Bee Story"; Episode 12
Jane Leeves	Admiral Acronym; Queen Bee	"Bee Story"; Episode 12
Amanda Plummer	Prof. Poofenplotz	"Bee Story"; Episode 12
Wayne Brady	Don, the City Hall guide	"Where's Pinky?"; Episode 14
Maia Mitchell	Herself	"Phineas and Ferb's Musical Cliptastic; Countdown Hosted by Kelly Osbourne"; Episode 15
Kelly Osbourne	Herself	"Phineas and Ferb's Musical Cliptastic; Countdown Hosted by Kelly Osbourne"; Episode 15
Jennifer Wong	Chloe	"Love at First Byte"; Episode 20
Pamela Adlon	Melanie	"One Good Turn"; Episode 21
Billy Gardell	Mayor Chickenen	"One Good Turn"; Episode 21
Ming-Na Wen	Dr. Hirano	"One Good Turn"; Episode 21
Charlie Adler	MODOK	"Phineas and Ferb: Mission Marvel"; Episode 22
Drake Bell	Spider-Man	"Phineas and Ferb: Mission Marvel"; Episode 22
Stan Lee	New York City hot dog vendor Narrator	"Phineas and Ferb: Mission Marvel"; Episode 22
Allie MacKay	Little old lady	"Phineas and Ferb: Mission Marvel"; Episode 22
Chi McBride	Nick Fury	"Phineas and Ferb: Mission Marvel"; Episode 22
Liam O'Brien	Red Skull	"Phineas and Ferb: Mission Marvel"; Episode 22
Adrian Pasdar	Iron Man	"Phineas and Ferb: Mission Marvel"; Episode 22
Peter Stormare	Whiplash	"Phineas and Ferb: Mission Marvel"; Episode 22
Fred Tatasciore	Hulk	"Phineas and Ferb: Mission Marvel"; Episode 22
Danny Trejo	Venom	"Phineas and Ferb: Mission Marvel"; Episode 22
Travis Willingham	Thor	"Phineas and Ferb: Mission Marvel"; Episode 22
Seth Green	Monty Monogram	"Thanks But No Thanks"; Episode 23
Goldie Hawn	Peggy McGee	"Thanks But No Thanks"; Episode 23
Gordon Ramsay	Chef	"Thanks But No Thanks"; Episode 23
Diedrich Bader	Albert	"Troy Story"; Episode 24
Leah Remini	Doreen	"Troy Story"; Episode 24
Seth Green	Monty Monogram	"Druselsteinoween"; Episode 25
Oliver Chris	Mr. Macabre	"Terrifying Tri-State Trilogy of Terror"; Episode 26
Jay Harris	Bank officer	"Terrifying Tri-State Trilogy of Terror"; Episode 26
Alex Hirsch	Officer Concord	"Terrifying Tri-State Trilogy of Terror"; Episode 26
David Koechner	Rusty Bridges	"Terrifying Tri-State Trilogy of Terror"; Episode 26
Todd Stashwick	Mr. Johnson	"Face Your Fear"; Episode 27
Carlos Alazraqui	Bobbi Fabulous	"Cheers for Fears"; Episode 28
Jaret Reddick	Danny	"Cheers for Fears"; Episode 28
Paul Alborough	Professor Elemental	"Steampunx"; Episode 29
Samantha Bee	Lyla Loliberry; Food truck girl	"Just Our Luck"; Episode 30
Danny Jacob	Himself	"Just Our Luck"; Episode 30
Jason Sklar	Mark	"Just Our Luck"; Episode 30
Randy Sklar	Markus	"Just Our Luck"; Episode 30
Jeremy Clarkson	Adrian	"Live and Let Drive"; Episode 32
Patrick Dempsey	Paolo Vanderbeek	"Live and Let Drive"; Episode 32
Richard Hammond	Nigel	"Live and Let Drive"; Episode 32
James May	Ian	"Live and Let Drive"; Episode 32
Jay Leno	Col. Contraction	"Phineas and Ferb Save Summer"; Episode 33
Kevin Michael Richardson	President Barack Obama	"Phineas and Ferb Save Summer"; Episode 33
Wallace Shawn	Saul	"Phineas and Ferb Save Summer"; Episode 33
Dee Bradley Baker	Mr. Doofenshmirtz	"Father's Day"; Episode 34
Malcolm McDowell	Grandpa Reg	"Father's Day"; Episode 34
Elizabeth Banks	Grulinda	"Imperfect Storm"; Episode 35
Simon Pegg	Pierre	"Imperfect Storm"; Episode 35
Jon Stewart	Mittington Random	"The Klimpaloon Ultimatum"; Episode 38
Jamie Hyneman	Office stormtrooper	"Phineas and Ferb: Star Wars"; Episode 41
Simon Pegg	Candace's commanding officer C-3PO	"Phineas and Ferb: Star Wars"; Episode 41
Adam Savage	Office stormtrooper	"Phineas and Ferb: Star Wars"; Episode 41
Jane Kaczmarek	Denise	"Lost in Danville"; Episode 42
Rob Morrow	Bernie	"Lost in Danville"; Episode 42
Terry O'Quinn	Prof. Mystery	"Lost in Danville"; Episode 42
Nick Frost	Ed	"Night of the Living Pharmacists"; Episode 44
Cloris Leachman	Eliza M. Feyersied	"Night of the Living Pharmacists"; Episode 44
Simon Pegg	Shaun	"Night of the Living Pharmacists"; Episode 44
George A. Romero	Don Adaded	"Night of the Living Pharmacists"; Episode 44
Bella Thorne	Brigitte	"Night of the Living Pharmacists"; Episode 44
Noah Wyle	Martin, the news vendor	"Night of the Living Pharmacists"; Episode 44
Allison Janney	Charlene Doofenshmirtz	"Tales from the Resistance: Back to the 2nd Dimension"; Episode 45
Gary Cole	Principal Lang	"Doof 101"; Episode 46
Josh Gad	Wendell	"Doof 101"; Episode 46
Jennifer Grey	Mrs. Pierpont	"Doof 101"; Episode 46
Danica McKellar	Becky	"Doof 101"; Episode 46
Logan Miller	Johnny	"Doof 101"; Episode 46
Stephen Root	Floyd	"Doof 101"; Episode 46
JK Simmons	Napoleon	"Doof 101"; Episode 46
Paul Reubens	Prof. Parenthesis	"O.W.C.A. Files"; Episode 49

== Season 5 ==
Name	Role(s)	Episode
Jaret Reddick	Danny	"Cloudy with a Chance of Mom"; Episode 2
Jonathan Banks	Brian	"License to Bust"; Episode 4
Brendan Hunt	Dr. Mosley Shamai	"Deconstructing Doof"; Episode 6
Michael Bublé	Himself	"Tropey McTropeFace"; Episode 7
Mindy Sterling	Veterinarian	"A Chip to the Vet"; Episode 9
Kelly Dempsey	Receptionist	"A Chip to the Vet"; Episode 9
Seth Green	Monty Monogram	"The Aurora Perry-Alis"; Episode 11
Ming-Na Wen	Dr. Hirano	"Agent T (for Teen)"; Episode 14
Alan Cumming	Haberdasher	"The Haberdasher"; Episode 15
Lake Bell	Katherine Marshall	"Out of Character"; Episode 16
John Stamos	Meap	"Meap Me in St. Louis"; Episode 17
Leslie Jones	Alliance Commander	"Meap Me in St. Louis"; Episode 17
David Mitchell	Mitch	"Meap Me in St. Louis"; Episode 17
N/A	Tyler	"No Slumber Party"; Episode 18
Dan Povenmire	Bubba Doofenshmirtz	"The Ballad of Bubba Doof"; Episode 19
Kevin Michael Richardson	Mr. Slushy Burger manager	"Attack of the Candace Suit"; Episode 20
Alex Povenmire	C-Suit	"Attack of the Candace Suit"; Episode 20
Anna Faris	Samantha Sweetwater	"Book Flub"; Episode 21
Cristo Fernández	Himself	"Bend It Like Doof"; Episode 26
Megan Rapinoe	Herself	"Bend It Like Doof"; Episode 26
Diedrich Bader	Captain Dirk Mortenson	"Space Adventure"; Episode 28
Ruth Negga	Lieutenant Zarna	"Space Adventure"; Episode 28
Rhys Darby	Lamond	"Space Adventure"; Episode 28
Fred Tatasciore	Nosh	"Space Adventure"; Episode 28
Tati Gabrielle	Sophia Sharkboard	"Space Adventure"; Episode 28
Kwesi James	Honey Badger Guard	"Space Adventure"; Episode 28
Zach Kornfeld	Team Officer #1	"Space Adventure"; Episode 28
Carlos Alazraqui	Bobbi Fabulous	"Doofercise"; Episode 30
Seth Green	Monty Monogram	"Dinner Reservations"; Episode 32
Diane Morgan	Chowdina	"Bread Bowl Hot Tub"; Episode 33
Iain Stirling	Dating Show Host	"Dungeons & Dating"; Episode 35
Kelly Dempsey	Susanne	"Dungeons & Dating"; Episode 35
Jaret Reddick	Danny	"VENDPOCALYPSE THE MUSICAL"; Episode 38
Meghan Trainor	Vending Machine Prime	"VENDPOCALYPSE THE MUSICAL"; Episode 38

== Season 6 ==
Name	Role(s)	Episode
Alex Povenmire	C-Suit	"Night of the Living Candace Suits"; Episode 1
Simu Liu	Prof. Lem Enall	"Terrors of the AltSpace"; Episode 2

== Films ==
The following appeared as guest stars in Phineas and Ferb the Movie: Across the 2nd Dimension.

Name	Role
Carlos Alazraqui	Spanish announcer
Jaret Reddick	Danny
Doris Roberts	Mrs. Thompson
Slash	Himself
Steve Zahn	Sherman "Swampy"

The following appeared as guest stars in Phineas and Ferb the Movie: Candace Against the Universe.

Name	Role
Ali Wong	Super Super Big Doctor
Wayne Brady	Stapler-Fist
Thomas Middleditch	Garnoz
Diedrich Bader	Borthos
Thomas Sanders	Throat-Lobster
"Weird Al" Yankovic	Shirt Cannon Guy
Tiffany Haddish	"The Sound Someone Makes When They Explode From The Waist Up"

== See also ==
- List of Phineas and Ferb characters
