= Wizard of Odd =

- Phineas and Ferb episode
- Episode no.: Season 2 Episode 26
- Directed by: Robert F. Hughes; Jay Lender
- Written by: Michael Diederich; Kaz (storyboards)
- Story by: Scott Peterson
- Production code: 226
- Original air date: September 24, 2010

Episode chronology
← Previous "Nerds of a Feather"	Next → "We Call It Maze"
- Phineas and Ferb (season 2)

"Wizard of Odd" is the 26th episode of the second season of the animated television series Phineas and Ferb, the 56th broadcast episode segment in the season and the 52nd episode overall. It was originally broadcast on Disney Channel and later Disney XD on September 24, 2010. In this episode, a parody of The Wonderful Wizard of Oz, Candace Flynn tries to find her way home by traveling to the Wizard in "Bustopolis" before she’s pursued by Doofenwarlock.

== Plot ==
Phineas and Ferb wash the house by spinning it around rapidly as they spray it. Candace passes out from dizziness while reading The Wizard of Oz and wakes up along with Perry the Platypus in the house in an Oz-like dream world, the house crushing Suzy and her red boots. Candace is greeted by the "Patchkins" (Fireside Girls). The Good Witch (Isabella) gives the boots to Candace, which Doofenwarlock (Dr. Doofenshmirtz) seeks. Phineas and Ferb pull down the background and tell Candace to "have fun". The Good Witch directs Candace to the Wizard in "Bustopolis" to bust her brothers, telling her to unwaveringly follow the yellow sidewalk before she floats away.

Along the way, Candace and Perry encounter Baljeet, a "nerd-crow" who wishes to be cool; a tree (Jeremy), who wishes to be a "real boy"; and a lion–tiger–bear hybrid (Buford), who wishes for nothing. As the group travels to Bustopolis to have their wishes granted, Phineas and Ferb offer alternate fun paths to get there, but Candace refuses to leave the yellow sidewalk.

Perry travels to Doofenwarlock's castle, but is captured. Doofenwarlock captures Candace using his flying squirrels so he can take the red boots. Perry easily gets out of his trap, and Candace escapes with the help of her friends.

The group arrives in Bustopolis, where the Wizard (Linda) gives Baljeet "cool" sunglasses, Buford a ham sandwich, and Jeremy the realization that he was merely wearing a tree costume. Candace gives the boots to Doofenwarlock, but he is crushed by Dorothy Gale and Toto's house. Candace asks the Wizard to bust the boys, but she says they were only trying to help Candace have fun. Candace wakes up in her bed, where Phineas and Ferb invite her to join them in a giant unicycle; having learned her lesson, she accepts. Phineas and Ferb once again pull down the screen and say to "have fun".

== Production ==
This episode was produced in 2009. In 2011, background painter Jill Daniels and background designer Brian Woods both won Primetime Emmy Awards for Outstanding Individual Achievement in Animation for their contributions to this episode. In Italy, this episode was titled "Divertiti Candace", Germany titled "Der Zauberer von Spotz", and Poland titled "Czarnoksiężnik" which all aired this episode before the United States. This episode has some of the most songs of any episode and is the second where all are sung by a character onscreen following "Dude, We're Getting the Band Back Together".

== Reception ==
=== Ratings ===
This episode had 3.1 million viewers, the most since "Phineas and Ferb: Summer Belongs to You!". In the United Kingdom, it delivered 108,000 viewers when it premiered on Disney XD on October 21, 2010, the Going Live broadcast on the same day featured a skit after the episode where the programme's presenter Nathan Simpson went into the transmission area of the studio and famously said "That episode or anything Wizard of Oz related shall not be shown AGAIN on my programme! DO You understand?!?!?", this skit was repeated 10 years, 2 months and 3 days later when The 1939 Metro-Goldwyn-Mayer film version starring Judy Garland was shown. The Disney Channel premiere on December 11, 2010 in the same country had 124,000 viewers.

=== Critical reception ===
Wired's GeekDad favorably reviewed the episode, praising the songs in the episode while also commenting that some of the episode's humor was aimed at adults rather than the younger viewers.

== Notes ==
[a] denotes song
