= Phineas and Ferb season 3 =

Phineas and Ferb
- Season 3
- Showrunners: Dan Povenmire; Jeff "Swampy" Marsh
- No. of episodes: 35 (62 segments)

Release
- Original network: Disney Channel; Disney XD
- Original release: March 4, 2011 – November 30, 2012

Season chronology
- ← Previous; Season 2 Next → Season 4

The third season of Phineas and Ferb first aired on Disney Channel on March 4, 2011, and on Disney XD on March 5, 2011. The five main characters include stepbrothers Phineas Flynn and Ferb Fletcher, the boys' older sister Candace Flynn, secret agent Perry the Platypus (who is also Phineas and Ferb's pet), and the evil scientist Dr. Heinz Doofenshmirtz. Midway through the season, the television film Across the Second Dimension aired on August 5, 2011.

Recurring characters include across-the-street neighbor Isabella Garcia-Shapiro, the boys' mother and father Linda Flynn-Fletcher and Lawrence Fletcher, Major Monogram, Carl the Intern, Jeremy Johnson, Baljeet Tjinder, Buford Van Stomm, Stacy Hirano, and many more.

== Production ==
The season was first teased by series creators Dan Povenmire and Jeff "Swampy" Marsh in a few interviews since April 12, 2009. News of this began appearing on June 7 of that year, and a press release about this confirmation was issued two days later. Production began in the summer of 2010, during the broadcast of the show's second season. Initial guest stars for the season were revealed on February 25, 2011, along with the announcement of its premiere. These included 30 Rock series creator Tina Fey, Wall Street lead actor Michael Douglas, Back to the Future star Michael J. Fox, and celebrity chef Jamie Oliver.

== Episodes ==
No. overall	No. in season	Title	Directed by	Written and storyboarded by	Story by	Original release date	Prod. code	U.S. viewers (millions)
66	1	"Run, Candace, Run"	Jay Lender	Michael Diederich, Antoine Guilbaud, Kyle Menke & Perry Zombolas	Sergio Armendariz, Jon Colton Barry, Jennifer Keene & Martin Olson	March 11, 2011	301	3.21
66	1	"Last Train to Bustville"	Robert F. Hughes	Antoine Guilbaud, Jeff Myers & Mike Roth	Martin Olson	March 11, 2011	301	3.21
Phineas and Ferb's newest invention is a pair of boots that makes the wearer extraordinarily fast, and Candace decides to use them so that she can be in two places at once: Jeremy's family picnic and a children's reading session at the library, but things go haywire when she accidentally uses unstable prototypes of the boots. Meanwhile, Doofenshmirtz's building is put up for sale, so he tries to convince a prospective buyer, Annabelle, who turns out to be a long-lost relative of the Johnson family, that it is not worth buying. Guest star: Tina Fey as Annabelle Johnson While visiting their grandparents, Phineas, Ferb, and their friends decide to build and race hot air balloons. Meanwhile, inspired by train engineer Glenda's can-do attitude, Candace vows to stop trying to bust her brothers. Elsewhere, Doofenshmirtz builds an inator to hatch a dodo egg, expecting a fierce, rampaging monster to help him take over the Tri-State Area, but is stunned to discover the exact opposite.
67	2	"The Great Indoors"	Jay Lender	Chong Suk Lee & Bernie Petterson	Jim Bernstein	March 4, 2011	302	3.31
67	2	"Canderemy"	Jay Lender	J. G. Orrantia & Kim Roberson	Scott Peterson	March 4, 2011	302	3.31
When bad weather spoils Isabella's plan for the Fireside Girls to earn an accomplishment patch, Phineas and Ferb build a huge biodome capable of controlling its own weather to help her and her troop. Meanwhile, Candace uses the invention to figure out what Jeremy likes about her. Elsewhere, unbeknownst to everyone, the rain is caused by Doofenshmirtz's "Rain-inator", which he uses to cancel a soccer game and watch his Spanish soap opera without interruptions. Candace realizes she has not been spending enough time with Stacy, and promises to spend the entire day with her. However, while visiting Jeremy and his mother, Doofenshmirtz's "Combine-inator" accidentally zaps her and a sleeping Jeremy together at the hip. Meanwhile, Phineas and Ferb build a giant robot dog that causes all sorts of mischief.
68	3	"The Belly of the Beast"	Jay Lender	Michael Diederich & Kyle Menke	Jim Bernstein	April 29, 2011	303	2.30
68	3	"Moon Farm"	Robert F. Hughes	Antoine Guilbaud & Kaz	Jim Bernstein	April 29, 2011	303	2.30
Phineas and Ferb decide to celebrate the Danville Harbor Day Festival by building a mechanical version of the historically elusive shark of Danville Harbor. Candace, eager to bust her brothers, enlists the help of a man named Captain Squint and his ship to capture the shark and show it to Linda. Meanwhile, Doofenshmirtz invents the "Salt Water Taffy-inator," planning to sell saltwater taffy to give tooth decay to all the children in the Tri-State Area. Phineas and Ferb are inspired by a forgotten verse from the nursery rhyme "The Cat and the Fiddle" and decide to send a few cows to the Moon to test if the low gravitational pull results in the best-tasting ice cream ever. Back on Earth, Candace attempts to cook a fancy dinner for Jeremy, but her culinary skills leave much to be desired. Meanwhile, Doofenshmirtz uses his "Moisture Suck-inator" to dry out his neighbor's plants, hoping to make his own garden look greener by comparison.
69	4	"Phineas' Birthday Clip-O-Rama!" (Note: This episode is a half-hour special.)	Jay Lender	Chong Suk Lee & Bernie Petterson	Scott Peterson	April 1, 2011	304	2.49
It is Phineas's birthday, and to celebrate, Ferb puts together a clip show featuring the gang's favorite moments. Candace sees this as the perfect opportunity to finally bust her brothers. Meanwhile, Perry must stop Doofenshmirtz from using his "Video-Beam-Hijack-Non-inator" to preempt Roger’s biography from airing on television.
70	5	"Ask a Foolish Question"	Jay Lender	Chong Suk Lee & Bernie Petterson	Martin Olson	May 13, 2011	305	2.56
70	5	"Misperceived Monotreme"	Jay Lender	Kaz & Tom Minton	Martin Olson	May 13, 2011	305	2.56
When Candace discovers that Phineas and Ferb have invented a computer that can answer anything, she asks it how she can finally bust her brothers. Meanwhile, Doofenshmirtz loses the key to his latest invention, the "All Purpose-inator," and Perry must find it before he does. It is Doofenshmirtz and Perry's 100th battle, and O.W.C.A. has set up cameras all over Doofenshmirtz Evil Incorporated to capture the moment. Unbeknownst to both Doofenshmirtz and O.W.C.A., Perry has been accidentally switched with a regular platypus from the zoo and is forced to accompany Candace and Jeremy to the Charity Pet Wash. Perry's absence goes unnoticed, however, as the normal platypus unwittingly foils Doofenshmirtz's plan to zap his brother with his "Least Likely-inator." Meanwhile, Phineas and Ferb turn their house into a funhouse.
71	6	"Candace Disconnected"	Robert F. Hughes	Aliki Theofilopoulos Grafft & Antoine Guilbaud	Martin Olson	June 18, 2011	306	N/A
71	6	"Magic Carpet Ride"	Jay Lender	Michael Diederich & Tom Minton	Jennifer Keene	June 18, 2011	306	N/A
Candace asks Phineas and Ferb for help after losing her phone for the fifth time. Unbeknownst to her, the phone they invent includes a voice-activated transfer app that accidentally sends her to Easter Island. Meanwhile, Doofenshmirtz creates a "Pick 'Em Up-inator" to pick up Vanessa from school so he can enjoy his exercise show. While downstairs, he discovers the original prototype of Norm's head, which has a strong affinity for sarcasm. Guest star: Joel McHale as original Norm head Inspired by their father's favorite childhood show, Phineas and Ferb decide to create a magic carpet. Meanwhile, Candace becomes convinced that fortune cookies will finally help her bust her brothers. Elsewhere, Doofenshmirtz plans to ruin his brother's art unveiling by using his "Stain-inator" to deface a mysterious painting, only to discover that the artwork is actually his own childhood masterpiece, created years ago from Gimmelshtump.
72	7	"Bad Hair Day"	Robert F. Hughes	Kaz & Kim Roberson	Jim Bernstein & Lance LeCompte	June 24, 2011	307	4.37
72	7	"Meatloaf Surprise"	Robert F. Hughes	Bernie Petterson & Chong Suk Lee	Martin Olson	June 24, 2011	307	4.37
After a botched haircut, Candace asks Phineas and Ferb for help, and they build a hair-growing machine to fix it before the Endangered Animal Benefit with Jeremy and his mother. However, when she cranks it to max power, her hair grows out of control, causing her to be mistaken for a rare tangerine orangutan. Meanwhile, Doofenshmirtz assembles a "Very, Very Bad-inator" from parts of his old inventions. Linda joins celebrity chef Jamie Oliver as a judge for Danville's Meatloaf Festival Cook-off. Meanwhile, Candace bids on a prized Tiny Cowboy souvenir at a rock memorabilia auction but gets sidetracked when Phineas and Ferb build a backyard bounce house. At the same time, Doofenshmirtz enters his family's meatloaf recipe in the contest and uses a "Rotten-inator" to sabotage the competition. Guest stars: Jamie Oliver as himself, Davy Jones as Nigel, and Peter Noone as Adrian Note: This episode features Davy Jones in his final television role before his passing in 2012.
73	8	"Tri-Stone Area"	Robert F. Hughes	Aliki Theofilopoulos Grafft & Antoine Guilbaud	Scott Peterson	January 13, 2012	308	N/A
73	8	"Doof Dynasty"	Jay Lender	Michael Diederich & Tom Minton	Scott Peterson	January 14, 2012	308	N/A
In the Stone Age, Phineas and Ferb are reimagined as cave kids, Phinnebunk and Gerb, who set out to invent the wheel, much to the annoyance of Cantok (Candace). Meanwhile, Bunka (Perry) must stop Doofengung (Doofenshmirtz) from using his Stick-inator to provoke mammoths into destroying (Ro-juh) Roger's home. In ancient feudal China, Princess Isabella rules under the guidance of Regent Monogram, while Master Perry has abandoned the way of the warrior. When Doofus Khan's forces capture the Princess, Phineas, Ferb, Buford, and Baljeet seek out Master Perry to train them in the warrior arts and help save Isabella and all of China from destruction.
74	9	"Phineas and Ferb Interrupted"	Jay Lender	Kaz & Kim Roberson	Jennifer Keene	July 15, 2011	309	4.29
74	9	"A Real Boy"	Robert F. Hughes	Aliki Theofilopoulos Grafft & Antoine Guilbaud	Martin Olson, Jim Bernstein & Scott Peterson	July 15, 2011	309	4.29
When Linda wants to spend the day with her, Candace insists on staying in the backyard to finally bust her brothers. However, Phineas and Ferb's only plan, after being zapped by Doofenshmirtz's "Dull and Boring-inator", is to watch grass grow. Meanwhile, Perry teams up with Doofenshmirtz to rebuild the device into a "Dynamic-inator" to restore the boys' creativity. When Doofenshmirtz believes Vanessa overheard him say he would rather have a son to do his evil bidding, he feels guilty and plans to zap her with the "Forget-About-It-inator." Meanwhile, Norm expresses his desire to be a "real" boy and spends time with Doofenshmirtz, calling him his father. At the same time, Candace asks Stacy to hypnotize her into ignoring the urge to bust Phineas and Ferb so she can relax with Jeremy, but the hypnosis trigger words end up disrupting their date.
75	10	"Mommy Can You Hear Me?"	Jay Lender	J. G. Orrantia & Kaz	Jim Bernstein, Martin Olson & Scott Peterson	July 29, 2011	310	3.11
75	10	"Road Trip"	Robert F. Hughes	Written by : Scott Peterson, Kaz & Kim Roberson; Storyboarded by : Kaz & Kim Roberson	-	July 29, 2011	310	3.11
After Candace hurt her leg and is stuck in bed, she grows increasingly frustrated trying to get Linda's attention to bust Phineas and Ferb for attempting to communicate with astronauts. Meanwhile, Perry must stop Doofenshmirtz from flooding a deli with chicken soup. On the last day of the Flynn-Fletcher family road trip, Candace hopes for a few peaceful hours without having to worry about busting her brothers. However, when Phineas and Ferb build a "No-Stop Truck Stop" diner on top of the rented RV, she gets roped into playing the role of a sassy waitress. Meanwhile, Perry tries to intercept a shipment of "boom juice" that Doofenshmirtz needs to power his self-destruct devices. Note: The series' first film, Phineas and Ferb the Movie: Across the 2nd Dimension, premiered in between this episode and "Tour de Ferb".
76	11	"Skiddley Whiffers"	Jay Lender	Chong Suk Lee & Tom Minton	Jim Bernstein	August 26, 2011	311	3.81
76	11	"Tour de Ferb"	Jay Lender	Bernie Petterson & Chong Suk Lee	Jim Bernstein & Martin Olson	August 12, 2011	311	3.93
Phineas, Ferb, and their friends turn Danville into a giant version of Candace's favorite childhood board game, Skiddley Whiffers. Meanwhile, Doofenshmirtz struggles with Vanessa growing up and seeking independence. After dropping her off on a camping trip with friends, he secretly follows her, disguised as a camper—with Perry's help, hoping to keep her safe from afar. When Baljeet reveals that he comes from a long line of bicycle race losers, Phineas and Ferb recruit cyclist Greg LeMond to host a race and help him regain his confidence. Meanwhile, Doofenshmirtz uses his "Pop-Up-inator" to flood the Tri-State Area with annoying pop-up ads for his products.
77	12	"My Fair Goalie"	Jeff "Swampy" Marsh & Robert F. Hughes	Jon Colton Barry & Mike Milo	Jon Colton Barry & Jim Bernstein	September 9, 2011	312	4.65
When Ferb's cousins visit from England and challenge him to a soccer match, Phineas and Ferb alter the laws of physics to build a high-tech 3D stadium. Meanwhile, convinced that her relationship with Jeremy depends on being more proper, Candace enlists her step-cousin, Eliza, to teach her the rules of etiquette. Meanwhile, Doofenshmirtz, sick on the couch, forces himself to activate his "If-a-Tree-Fell-in-the-Forest-inator," causing every tree, and anything else its beam hits, to say his name when they fall.
78	13	"Perry the Actorpus"	Robert F. Hughes	Eddy Houchins & Kaz	Scott Peterson	March 3, 2012 (Note: This episode premiered on Disney Channel and Disney XD simultaneously.)	313	N/A
78	13	"Bullseye!"	Jay Lender	J. G. Orrantia & Kaz	Martin Olson	September 30, 2011	313	4.18
Perry is chosen as the spokesanimal for Totally Tools, risking his secret agent life. Sergei the Snail takes over to stop Doofenshmirtz, who plans to prank the townsfolk with his "Mustache-inator". Meanwhile, Candace attends a retreat to control her obsession with busting Phineas and Ferb. Phineas and Ferb create giant-sized dartboards and darts for a game, while Linda works on a junk sculpture for an auction. Candace, determined to bust the boys, mistakes the sculpture for one of their projects. Meanwhile, Lawrence, en route to a speaking engagement about antiques, accidentally ends up at the L.O.V.E.M.U.F.F.I.N. Pageant of Evil, where he unknowingly becomes a participant.
79	14	"That's the Spirit!"	Jay Lender	Bernie Petterson & Michael Diederich	Scott Peterson	October 7, 2011	314	2.79
79	14	"The Curse of Candace"	Robert F. Hughes & Jay Lender	J. G. Orrantia & Kaz	Martin Olson	October 7, 2011	314	2.79
On Halloween night, Phineas, Ferb, Candace, and their friends visit a haunted house, where they meet a strange boy named Russell who believes his home is haunted. Meanwhile, Doofenshmirtz's attempt to transfer his mind into a cow to destroy all the grass in the Tri-State Area backfires, transforming him into a terrifying "were-cow" that wreaks havoc whenever there is a full moon. Candace becomes convinced she is turning into a vampire after watching a popular vampire movie with Stacy and getting bitten by a bat, an idea only reinforced by Phineas and Ferb's latest gadgets. Meanwhile, Doofenshmirtz plots to transform Danville into an exact replica of his hometown, Gimmelshtump, believing it will make the Tri-State Area easier to conquer. Guest stars: Michael J. Fox, Anna Paquin
80	15	"Escape from Phineas Tower"	Jay Lender	Bernie Petterson, Michael Diederich & Tom Minton	Kaz	October 21, 2011	315	3.34
80	15	"The Remains of the Platypus"	Zac Moncrief	John Mathot & Zac Moncrief	Clint Daniels & Jill Daniels	February 24, 2012	315	3.34
Phineas and Ferb build a giant, computer-controlled tower to become expert escape artists, but it malfunctions after being struck by one of Doofenshmirtz's inventions. Meanwhile, Doofenshmirtz tries to sabotage his brother Roger's meeting with a foreign dignitary, but his plans accidentally disrupt Phineas and Ferb's project instead. In a special "backwards episode" told in reverse order, Phineas and Ferb create Cheese-topia, a giant cheese-themed amusement park. Meanwhile, Doofenshmirtz uses his "Butler-inator" to turn Perry into his butler, and Perry must figure out why he seems to have lost his memory.
81	16	"Ferb Latin"	Robert F. Hughes & Jay Lender	Antoine Guilbaud & Kaz	Jon Colton Barry & Jim Bernstein	November 25, 2011	316	2.93
81	16	"Lotsa Latkes"	Jay Lender	Chong Suk Lee & Mike Milo	Jon Colton Barry & Jim Bernstein	November 18, 2011	316	3.61
Phineas and Ferb invent a new language, Ferb Latin, which quickly becomes popular. Meanwhile, Doofenshmirtz uses propaganda in an attempt to make everyone do his bidding. Phineas and Ferb's attempt to clone potatoes goes awry, leading to an infestation of mischievous potato gremlins. Meanwhile, Doofenshmirtz tries to use a machine to summon the Spartan Army to help him take over the Tri-State Area, but accidentally summons the Mongol Army instead.
82	17	"A Phineas and Ferb Family Christmas"	Dan Povenmire & Robert F. Hughes	Written by : Scott Peterson; Storyboarded by : Derek Thompson, Seth Kearsley & Wendy Grieb	Scott Peterson	December 2, 2011	317a (Note: 317b is just a repeat of the first season episode "S'Winter".)	4.22
To take their minds off the hot weather, Phineas and Ferb decide to celebrate the holidays early by putting on a traditional family Christmas special. Meanwhile, when Doofenshmirtz sees the special on TV, he tries to hastily cram his Christmas shopping into one day. Guest star: Kelly Clarkson as herself
83	18	"What a Croc!"	Robert F. Hughes	Aliki Theofilopoulos Grafft & Antoine Guilbaud	Martin Olson	June 1, 2012	318	2.73
83	18	"Ferb TV"	Robert F. Hughes	Chong Suk Lee & Mike Milo	Scott Peterson	September 7, 2012	318	3.61
When Phineas and Ferb learn that Crikey the Crocodile, former star of Little Crikey the Crocodile, has gone missing, they set out to find him and return him to the Danville Nature Preserve. Meanwhile, Candace discovers that Irving has compiled a digital scrapbook of all of Phineas and Ferb's wild inventions and pesters him to use it as evidence to finally bust them. Elsewhere, Doofenshmirtz plots to embarrass his brother by using a "Chicken-Replace-inator" to swap Roger's mayoral award with the nearest chicken. Guest star: Ray Liotta as himself Phineas and Ferb create a cable channel called "Ferb TV," featuring various parodies of television programs and commercials. Absent: Dr. Doofenshmirtz (voice only in closing credits) and Major Monogram
84	19	"Mom's in the House"	Jay Lender	Antoine Guilbaud & Kaz	Martin Olson	March 2, 2012	319	2.45
84	19	"Minor Monogram"	Dan Povenmire	Jon Colton Barry & Kyle Menke	Jim Bernstein	May 11, 2012	319	2.78
When Phineas and Ferb cannot find Perry, they decide to build a Perrytronic 3000 to fill in for his absence. Meanwhile, Candace tries out a new strategy called B.B. (Busy Bee) Busting in an effort to stop the boys from finishing their project before Linda comes home. Elsewhere, Doofenshmirtz creates a "Duplicator-inator" to duplicate his head and make himself twice as smart. As Fall approaches, Phineas and Ferb create "S'Fall," a vibrant world filled with giant leaf piles and gourds. Meanwhile, Doofenshmirtz mentors a young evil scientist named Rodrigo, who ends up capturing both him and Perry. Fortunately, Perry receives backup from Monty Monogram, the son of his boss, Major Monogram. Guest star: Jorge Garcia as Rodrigo
85	20	"Excaliferb"	Robert F. Hughes	Aliki Theofilopoulos Grafft & J. G. Orrantia	Scott Peterson	January 15, 2012	320	2.17
Major Monogram is home sick, so Carl visits him and tells the story of Excaliferb from a book. Set in medieval times, the tale follows Phineas and Ferb (known as Ferbalot) on an epic quest to find the legendary sword, Excaliferb, and defeat the evil sorcerer, Malifishmirtz.
86	21	"Monster from the Id"	Jay Lender	Kaz & Kim Roberson	Jim Bernstein	February 10, 2012	321	2.51
86	21	"Gi-Ants"	Robert F. Hughes	Mike Milo & Seth Kearsley	Jim Bernstein	February 10, 2012	321	2.51
After losing a gift from Jeremy, Candace enlists Phineas and Ferb to help her recreate it by entering her subconscious with their Mind Machine. Meanwhile, Doofenshmirtz tries to take over the Tri-State Area with his "Underwear-inator", banking on everyone's fear of being seen in their underwear. Absent: Major Monogram Phineas and Ferb build a giant ant farm to experience life from an ant's perspective. When Candace, determined to bust them, accidentally sprays herself with ant pheromones and follows them inside, she inadvertently becomes the queen of the colony. Meanwhile, Doofenshmirtz attempts to exploit the sleep-inducing effects of turkey with his latest invention, the "Turkey-inator".
87	22	"Agent Doof"	Robert F. Hughes	Bernie Petterson & Mike Diederich	Scott Peterson	May 11, 2012	322	2.78
87	22	"Phineas and Ferb and the Temple of Juatchadoon"	Jay Lender	Bernie Petterson & Mike Diederich	Jim Bernstein	January 16, 2012 (Note: This episode premiered on Disney XD prior to Disney Channel. This episode premiered on Disney Channel on January 20, 2012.)	322	N/A
While Candace is in charge, Phineas and Ferb are accidentally turned into babies by Doofenshmirtz's "Babe-inator." Meanwhile, Doofenshmirtz surrenders to O.W.C.A., claiming to have given up his evil ways, and attempts to become an O.W.C.A. agent. After retrieving the Amulet of Juatchadoon, archaeologists Ohio Flynn (Phineas) and Rhode Island Fletcher (Ferb) travel to Central America to help Isabella find the Lost Temple and her missing mother. Meanwhile, Doofenshmirtz plans to use the amulet to awaken an evil corn colossus and destroy the world.
88	23	"Delivery of Destiny"	Robert F. Hughes	Kaz & Kim Roberson	Scott Peterson	April 27, 2012	323	2.94
88	23	"Let's Bounce"	Robert F. Hughes	Kaz & Kim Roberson	Jim Bernstein	March 16, 2012	323	2.94
While Phineas and Ferb build a giant all-in-one amusement park ride through town and Doofenshmirtz uses his Juice-inator to turn Danville City Hall into juice, the story focuses on Paul, a delivery guy who encounters both subplots and questions whether his job is truly fulfilling. Phineas and Ferb create a trampoline park in the sky using an anti-gravity device. When Candace gets zapped by it, she struggles with zero gravity during brunch with Jeremy's family. Meanwhile, Doofenshmirtz invents the "Tell-the-Truth-inator" to force everyone to reveal their deepest secrets.
89	24	"Quietest Day Ever"	Jay Lender	Antoine Guilbaud & Kaz	Jim Bernstein	March 30, 2012	324	2.64
89	24	"Bully Bromance Breakup"	Jay Lender	John Mathot & Mike Milo	Scott Peterson	March 16, 2012	324	2.94
When Linda asks for quiet during her online knitting test, Phineas and Ferb build ninja suits that make the wearer invisible. Meanwhile, Candace struggles to bust them, and Doofenshmirtz accidentally makes himself incredibly handsome with his "De-Handsome-inator". After an argument with Baljeet, a heartbroken Buford teams up with Doofenshmirtz to conquer the Tri-State Area. Meanwhile, Baljeet embraces his newfound freedom and asks Phineas and Ferb to help him climb Danville Mountain, without inventing anything. Absent: Candace
90	25	"The Doonkelberry Imperative"	Jay Lender	Mike Diederich & Bernie Petterson	Martin Olson	March 30, 2012	325	2.64
90	25	"Buford Confidential"	Jay Lender	Kaz & Antoine Guilbaud	Jim Bernstein & Martin Olson	April 27, 2012	325	2.94
When Linda runs out of Doonkleberries for her famous pie, Phineas and Ferb travel to Drusselstein to find more. Meanwhile, Doofenshmirtz returns to Drusselstein to renew his driver's license, only to discover he must retake the driving test. Back in Danville, Candace searches for a library book on the scientific method to help her bust her brothers. Absent: Buford Brigitte, Josette, and Colette, the visiting Fireside Girls from France, join Isabella in capturing the American Grizzly Bear, one of the world's most dangerous creatures. Buford's plan to prank them by dressing up as the bear backfires when he recognizes Brigitte as his former crush, throwing him off his game. Meanwhile, back at their grandparents' cabin, Phineas and Ferb create the ultimate "run-through-the-sprinkler" experience. Elsewhere, Doofenshmirtz, fueled by his hatred of pretzels, invents a "De-Twist-inator" to untwist every pretzel in Danville.
91	26	"Sleepwalk Surprise"	Robert F. Hughes	Kaz & Kim Roberson	Scott Peterson	June 8, 2012	326	3.29
91	26	"Sci-Fi Pie Fly"	Jay Lender	John Mathot & Mike Milo	Jim Bernstein & Martin Olson	June 8, 2012	326	3.29
Candace's plans to hang out with Jeremy are derailed when he becomes hooked on Phineas and Ferb's latest game, jetpack volleyball. Meanwhile, after discovering that he invents "-inators" in his sleep, Doofenshmirtz decides to enter his dreams to figure out why. Phineas and Ferb build a flying saucer to investigate mysterious crop circles. Meanwhile, Candace takes a "me day" to break her tattling habit, and Doofenshmirtz uses his "Dough-Blow-inator" to rig a pizza dough-tossing contest.
92	27	"Meapless in Seattle"	Robert F. Hughes	Derek Thompson, Jon Colton Barry & Kyle Menke	Jon Colton Barry	April 6, 2012	327	3.06
Meap returns to enlist Phineas and Ferb's help in stopping his nemesis Mitch, who plans to become the most adorable, and most powerful, being in the galaxy. Meanwhile, Doofenshmirtz tries to rekindle his rivalry with Peter the Panda, only to find himself caught in a nemesis love triangle when Perry shows up. Guest stars: David Mitchell as Mitch, Lorenzo Lamas as Meap, and Jeff Foxworthy as Southern-accented Meap
93	28	"The Mom Attractor"	Robert F. Hughes	Aliki Theofilopoulos Grafft & J. G. Orrantia	Martin Olson	May 4, 2012	328	2.24
93	28	"Cranius Maximus"	Jay Lender	Bernie Petterson & Mike Diederich	Scott Peterson	May 4, 2012	328	2.24
When Phineas and Ferb ask Candace to decide what they should do for the day, she tells them to invent a device that will attract Linda home from across town so she can finally bust her brothers. Meanwhile, Doofenshmirtz attempts to embarrass his brother Roger with his "Baby-Cry-inator". To help Baljeet get smarter, Phineas and Ferb create a helmet that boosts his IQ, but it spirals out of control when he plans to move the Earth's atmosphere to the moon. Meanwhile, Doofenshmirtz uses his "Key-Find-inator" to track down the Key to the City.
94	29	"Sipping with the Enemy"	Robert F. Hughes	Kaz & Kim Roberson	Scott Peterson	June 22, 2012	329	3.85
94	29	"Tri-State Treasure: Boot of Secrets"	Jay Lender	J. G. Orrantia & Mike Milo	Jim Bernstein	June 22, 2012	329	3.85
Candace tries to bust Phineas and Ferb when they stage an enormous backyard magic show. Meanwhile, Vanessa and Major Monogram's son, Monty, go on a coffee date despite the rivalry between their fathers. Elsewhere, Doofenshmirtz attempts to become "hip" in a bid to attract a younger following. At the Danville Swap Meet, Phineas and Ferb help Lawrence track down the valuable 1807 Dorcham and Wesley Boot Scraper. Meanwhile, Candace goes through a series of trades to acquire a rare Ducky Momo collectible, and Doofenshmirtz uses the "De-Age-inator" to turn himself into a teenager, hoping to enter his propaganda film in the Danville Young Filmmakers Festival. Guest stars: Rob Morrow as Flea Market Salesman and Tim Curry as Worthington Dubois
95	30	"Doofapus"	Robert F. Hughes	Aliki Theofilopoulos Grafft, J. G. Orrantia & John Mathot	Scott Peterson	July 6, 2012	330	2.67
95	30	"Norm Unleashed"	Jay Lender	Bernie Petterson & Mike Diederich	Jim Bernstein & Martin Olson	July 20, 2012	330	3.26
Candace accidentally liquefies herself after coming into contact with Phineas and Ferb's device that turns solids into liquids. Meanwhile, Doofenshmirtz turns himself into a platypus in an attempt to make it easier to defeat Perry in battle. Candace struggles to bust Phineas and Ferb when they build nanobots that can become anything they imagine. Meanwhile, with Doofenshmirtz away on jury duty, Norm takes over and attempts to destroy Danville with weapons.
96	31	"When Worlds Collide"	Robert F. Hughes	Derek Thompson & Kyle Menke	Scott Peterson	September 14, 2012	331	2.64
96	31	"Road to Danville"	Jay Lender	Antoine Guilbaud & Kaz	Jim Bernstein & Jon Colton Barry	October 26, 2012	331	2.73
Phineas and Ferb work to stop a mysterious planet from colliding with Earth, while Buford eagerly anticipates meeting its alien inhabitants. Meanwhile, Doofenshmirtz uses a "Sphere-Attract-inator" in an attempt to steal the world's largest ball of twine. Note: This episode chronologically takes place on the same day as "Gi-Ants". Doofenshmirtz and Perry get stranded in the desert by one of his "-inators" and must find their way back to Danville.
97	32	"Where's Perry?" (Note: This episode is a one-hour special.)	Robert F. Hughes	Bernie Petterson, J. G. Orrantia, Kaz & Kim Roberson	Jim Bernstein, Martin Olson & Scott Peterson	July 26, 2012	332	3.73
98	33	"Where's Perry?"	Jay Lender & Robert F. Hughes	Aliki Theofilopoulos Grafft, Derek Thompson, Edgar Karapetyan, John Mathot, Jon Colton Barry & Kyle Menke	Jim Bernstein, Martin Olson & Scott Peterson	August 24, 2012	333	4.29
Part 1: The Flynn-Fletchers goes on vacation to Africa, leaving Perry behind to stop Doofenshmirtz, who plans to take over O.W.C.A. When Doofenshmirtz accidentally zaps Carl with his "Ultimate-Evil-inator" instead of Major Monogram, Carl takes control of O.W.C.A. and imprisons both Doofenshmirtz and Monogram. Perry intervenes, but after being zapped by several of Doofenshmirtz's "-inators," he mysteriously disappears. Part 2: Continuing from the previous episode, Phineas, Ferb, and the gang are stranded in an uncharted gorge, while Candace grows anxious about her relationship with Jeremy. Meanwhile, with Perry still missing, evil Carl sets out to find and destroy him, while Doofenshmirtz and Major Monogram team up to stop Carl. Guest star: Edi Gathegi as Ignatius Ukaremu
99	34	"Blackout!"	Jay Lender	Antoine Guilbaud & Kaz	Jim Bernstein	November 30, 2012	334	2.44
99	34	"What'd I Miss?"	Robert F. Hughes	Aliki Theofilopoulos Grafft & John Mathot	Scott Peterson	September 17, 2012 (Note: This episode premiered on Disney XD prior to Disney Channel. This episode premiered on Disney Channel on September 28, 2012.)	334	N/A
When Doofenshmirtz's latest "-inator" causes a citywide blackout, Phineas decides to make it the best blackout ever by building a large, unseen invention, while Candace tries to figure out what it is. Ferb returns early from Debate Camp and learns about the project he missed: training domesticated squirrels to survive in the wild. Meanwhile, Doofenshmirtz tells Perry (who was with Ferb at Debate Camp) what happened to his latest scheme: he attempted to build a "Leaky Faucet-inator" to soak his brother Roger with a giant drop of water, but was foiled by Perry's substitute, Agent R (a rhinoceros).
100	35	"This Is Your Backstory"	Jay Lender	Mike Diederich & Seth Kearsley	Scott Peterson	November 2, 2012	335	2.78
Norm hosts a TV show recapping some of Doofenshmirtz's wild backstories, while Phineas and Ferb engage in an intense yet otherwise mundane game of ping-pong.

== Ratings ==
All of the episodes have had positive reviews. The most viewed episode was "My Fair Goalie" with 4.7 million viewers, and the least watched episode was "Excaliferb" with 2.2 million viewers.

== DVD releases ==
Season	Episodes	Release dates
Season	Episodes	Region 1
3	62	The Perry Files: June 5, 2012; Episodes: "Ask a Foolish Question" (120), "Misperceived Monotreme" (121), "Candace Disconnected" (122), "Magic Carpet Ride" (123), "Mommy Can You Hear Me?" (128), "Road Trip" (129), "Bullseye!" (133), "Escape from Phineas Tower" (136), "The Remains of the Platypus" (146) and "Perry The Actorpus" (148) The Perry Files – Animal Agents: February 26, 2013; Episodes: "Lotsa Latkes" (137), "Agent Doof" (158), "Where's Perry?" (167–168) and "What'd I Miss?" (171)
Television film		Across the Second Dimension: August 23, 2011; Episodes: "Across the Second Dimension"
