= Phineas and Ferb season 2 =

Phineas and Ferb
- Season 2
- Showrunners: Dan Povenmire; Jeff "Swampy" Marsh
- No. of episodes: 39 (65 segments)

Release
- Original network: Disney Channel; Disney XD
- Original release: February 19, 2009 – February 11, 2011

Season chronology
- ← Previous; Season 1 Next → Season 3

The second season of Phineas and Ferb premiered on Disney XD on February 19, 2009, and a sneak peek of the season aired on Toon Disney on January 23, 2009, with the episode "Tip of the Day". The five main characters include stepbrothers Phineas Flynn and Ferb Fletcher, their older sister Candace Flynn, secret agent Perry the Platypus (who is also Phineas and Ferb's pet), and the evil scientist Dr. Heinz Doofenshmirtz.

Recurring characters include across-the-street neighbor Isabella Garcia-Shapiro, the boys' mom Linda Flynn-Fletcher, the boys' dad Lawrence Fletcher, Perry's boss Major Monogram, Carl the Intern, Candace's crush Jeremy Johnson, Baljeet Tjinder, Buford Van Stomm, Candace's best friend Stacy Hirano, and many more.

== Production ==
During the spring of 2008, Phineas and Ferb became the No. 1 animated show for kids and tweens. Seeing the success, Disney decided to renew the series for its second season – which was planned for twenty-six episodes at the time, unveiling it at the upfront presentation to advertisers on April 9 of that year. Later on July 27, thirteen more episodes were added to the order bringing the season to its final total of thirty-nine episodes. Production began in the fall of 2008, during the broadcast of the show's first season.

On January 18, 2009, the episode "Tip of the Day" was confirmed to air on Toon Disney on the 23rd of that month, as a preview of the second season for a weekend-long marathon. Later on February 2, it was announced that the season would officially premiere on Disney XD, starting on the 16th of that month.

== Episodes ==
No. overall	No. in season	Title	Directed by	Written and storyboarded by	Story by	Original release date	Prod. code	U.S. viewers (millions)
27	1	"The Lake Nose Monster" (Note: This episode is a half-hour special.)	Robert F. Hughes	Jon Colton Barry & Piero Piluso	Richard Goodman	February 19, 2009	201	N/A
Phineas and Ferb investigate the myth of the legendary "Lake Nose Monster", an inhabitant of Lake Nose. Meanwhile, Doofenshmirtz uses a machine to filter all of the zinc out of the water of the lake, even though he experiences trouble thinking of an evil scheme that could involve zinc, and Candace gets a job as a lifeguard on the lake's beach when Jeremy also works there as a lifeguard.
28	2	"Interview With a Platypus"	Zac Moncrief	Antoine Guilbaud & Kim Roberson	Jon Colton Barry	February 20, 2009	202	N/A
28	2	"Tip of the Day"	Robert F. Hughes	Jon Colton Barry & Piero Piluso	David Shane	January 23, 2009 (Note: This episode premiered as a sneak peek on Toon Disney. It officially premiered on Disney XD on February 20, 2009.)	202	N/A
Phineas and Ferb build a translator to see if Perry's chattering noises actually mean anything, but they discover it can work on other animals too. Meanwhile, Doofenshmirtz tries to flood the Tri-State Area so he can make it like Venice and force everyone to buy his new Buoyancy Operated Aquatic Transport, or BO-AT for short. Phineas and Ferb learn what the word "aglet" means and try to spread awareness of this to the world, while a disbelieving Candace and Stacy uses the campaign as an opportunity to become famous. Meanwhile, Doofenshmirtz tries to get an embarrassing video of himself skating into a toilet off the internet by erasing the world's memory of its existence.
29	3	"Attack of the 50 Foot Sister"	Zac Moncrief	Jon Colton Barry & Piero Piluso	Bill Motz & Bob Roth	February 21, 2009	203	N/A
29	3	"Backyard Aquarium"	Robert F. Hughes	Joe Orrantia & Mike Roth	Jen Kirkman	February 21, 2009	203	N/A
Candace uses a growth elixir Phineas and Ferb created to become tall enough to audition for a modeling career at a local festival after finding that she was not tall enough to do so, but as a result, she becomes a giant, causing an argument over her between the festival's modeling audition lady and an eccentric oddball show owner. Meanwhile, with the festival's annoyance, Doofenshmirtz plots to cover the festival with the smell of dirty diapers. Phineas and Ferb build a giant aquarium in their backyard for their new goldfish. Meanwhile, Candace awaits a phone call from Jeremy, and Doofenshmirtz plots to disrupt the hot dog vendors of Danville so he can force them to sell bratwurst.
30	4	"Day of the Living Gelatin"	Zac Moncrief	Mike Roth & Joe Orrantia	Michael Ryan	February 28, 2009	204	N/A
30	4	"Elementary My Dear Stacy"	Zac Moncrief	Antoine Guilbaud & Kim Roberson	Jon Colton Barry	February 28, 2009	204	N/A
Phineas and Ferb are inspired to make gelatin in their pool after Candace tells them to do something with their dessert, but when Doofenshmirtz demonstrates his newest invention, the "Turn Everything Evil-inator", it literally brings the gelatin to life. The Flynn-Fletchers and Stacy visit London, where Stacy and Candace investigate Phineas and Ferb’s newest scheme, a water slide from the top of Big Ben that ends on the London Eye, in the style of Sherlock Holmes. Meanwhile, Perry collaborates with a James Bond-esque British spy, Double 0-0 to foil Doofenshmirtz's plan to move Big Ben to Danville as an alternative to reading his tiny watch.
31	5	"Don't Even Blink"	Robert F. Hughes	Antoine Guilbaud & Kim Roberson	Bobby Gaylor & Dan Povenmire	April 4, 2009	205	N/A
31	5	"Chez Platypus"	Zac Moncrief	Antoine Guilbaud & Kim Roberson	Jen Kirkman & Jon Colton Barry	April 4, 2009	205	N/A
Candace tries to figure out where all of Phineas and Ferb's creations always go. Meanwhile, Doofenshmirtz experiments with a ray that can make things invisible. Phineas and Ferb open a platypus themed restaurant in their backyard, which quickly becomes the trendiest restaurant in town. Jeremy takes Candace there, but both of them have to deal with Buford who refuses to let them in. Meanwhile, Doofenshmirtz goes on a date at the restaurant with a woman also interested in evil, but threatens to use a satellite to eliminate all love in the Tri-State Area if it does not go well.
32	6	"Perry Lays an Egg"	Zac Moncrief	Joe Orrantia & Mike Roth	Michael Ryan	April 11, 2009	206	N/A
32	6	"Gaming the System"	Zac Moncrief	Joe Orrantia & Zac Moncrief	Bill Motz & Bob Roth	April 11, 2009	206	N/A
When Phineas and Ferb find an egg, they believe it belongs to Perry, so they build a mechanical contraption to care for it. When Candace sees what her brothers are doing, her maternal instincts emerge and she agrees to help, on the condition that they do things her way. Meanwhile, Doofenshmirtz plots revenge on whales who told his girlfriend to dump him by means of a whale translation device he created. Phineas and Ferb create their own video game and program themselves into it. When Candace is accidentally zapped into the game undressed, they have to bring her back in time for her cotillion. Meanwhile, Doofenshmirtz creates a device that can put ball gowns onto people to make them girlier, which would make him manlier by comparison.
33	7	"The Chronicles of Meap"	Jeff "Swampy" Marsh & Robert F. Hughes	Jon Colton Barry & Piero Piluso	Jon Colton Barry & David Shane	April 18, 2009	207	N/A
When Phineas and Ferb accidentally knock a spacecraft out of the air with a remote-controlled baseball, Candace discovers an alien named Meap, who she initially believes is a plush toy that had been "robotized" by her brothers. However, when Phineas, Ferb and Isabella are captured by Mitch, an alien poacher trying to capture the "cute" creature, Candace and Meap are forced to help rescue them. Meanwhile, when Doofenshmirtz tries to retrieve a balloon he had treated as a friend in his childhood using static electricity, he and Perry are launched into the crossfire of the battle with Mitch. Guest stars: David Mitchell as Mitch, Lorenzo Lamas as Meap, and Don LaFontaine as the narrator Note: This episode was dedicated to Don LaFontaine, as this was his final television appearance.
34	8	"Thaddeus and Thor"	Zac Moncrief	Antoine Guilbaud & Kim Roberson	Devin Bunje & Nick Stanton	June 15, 2009	208	N/A
34	8	"De Plane! De Plane!"	Zac Moncrief	Joe Orrantia & Mike Roth	David Teitelbaum	June 15, 2009	208	N/A
When Candace meets Mandy, the sister of a pair of brothers who also like to build ambitious projects, the two ultimately force their brothers to compete in building forts. Meanwhile at a family reunion, Doofenshmirtz tries to win a game of kickball with a robotic kicking leg. Phineas and Ferb build a massive passenger plane entirely out of papier-mâché, aiming to break the record of the longest wingspan held by the famous Spruce Goose. Meanwhile, at Jeremy's pool party, Candace grows jealous when she sees an Australian girl named Nicolette seemingly vying for Jeremy's attention, unaware that Nicolette is actually his cousin. Elsewhere, Doofenshmirtz constructs an "Evaporation-inator" using recycled materials.
35	9	"Let's Take a Quiz"	Zac Moncrief	Joe Orrantia & Mike Roth	Devin Bunje & Nick Stanton	June 22, 2009	209	N/A
35	9	"At the Car Wash"	Robert F. Hughes	Michael Diederich & Perry Zombolas	May Chan	June 22, 2009	209	N/A
When Candace finds out Jeremy will be starring in a television commercial, she eagerly joins a game show that Phineas and Ferb are producing, competing head-to-head with Buford in hopes of catching Jeremy's attention. Meanwhile, Doofenshmirtz hatches a plan to melt all the local TV station towers, hoping to break his unhealthy addiction to late-night infomercial shopping. Phineas and Ferb help Isabella and the Fireside Girls meet their fundraising goals by building the world's most elaborate automatic car wash. Meanwhile, Candace ignores Stacy's advice to play "hard to get" to Jeremy when he invites for a ride in his mother's car to the boys' car wash. Elsewhere, Doofenshmirtz tries to literally make mountains out of molehills.
36	10	"Oh, There You Are, Perry"	Robert F. Hughes	Aliki Theofilopoulos Grafft & Antoine Guilbaud	Jon Colton Barry	July 11, 2009	210	N/A
36	10	"Swiss Family Phineas"	Zac Moncrief	Sherm Cohen & Chong Lee	Scott Peterson	July 11, 2009	210	N/A
When Perry is reassigned to a new villain after Doofenshmirtz is downgraded to a low-level threat, he is ordered to leave the Flynn-Fletcher household and relocate to the new villain's area; the boys believe Perry has gone missing and try to find him. Meanwhile, after learning of his downgrade, Doofenshmirtz confronts Perry's new nemesis, but ends up accepting an internship with the new villain. After a storm leaves them stranded on a remote island, Phineas, Ferb and Isabella construct an elaborate treehouse to serve as their temporary shelter. Back home, Baljeet is put in charge of watching Perry, but quickly loses track of him when he leaves to stop Doofenshmirtz from using monkeys to start a laundry business.
37	11	"Phineas and Ferb's Musical Cliptastic Countdown"	Dan Povenmire	Written by : Scott Peterson	Jon Colton Barry	October 12, 2009	211	N/A
Major Monogram and Doofenshmirtz host a viewer-voted countdown of the top songs from Season 1. Meanwhile, Doofenshmirtz secretly plans to take over the world using a song scientifically engineered to get permanently stuck in people's heads.
38	12	"Phineas and Ferb's Quantum Boogaloo"	Zac Moncrief	Kaz & Kim Roberson	Scott Peterson	September 21, 2009	212	3.90
After encountering them in the future, an older version of Candace decides to steal Phineas and Ferb's time machine and go back in time to the day they built a rollercoaster so she can help the present Candace catch them in the act. However, when her actions cause a chain reaction turning the future into a dystopian society led by Doofenshmirtz, the future Candace decides to enlist her present brothers to help restore the good future. Guest stars: Jennifer Stone as Amanda, Noah Munck as Xavier, and Moisés Arias as Fred
39	13	"Hide and Seek"	Zac Moncrief	Kaz & Kim Roberson	Jon Colton Barry	July 18, 2009	213	N/A
39	13	"That Sinking Feeling"	Robert F. Hughes	Aliki Theofilopoulos Grafft & Antoine Guilbaud	May Chan	July 18, 2009	213	N/A
When Phineas and Ferb decide to play a game of indoor hide-and-seek, they shrink themselves, their friends, and their enthusiastic, self-proclaimed biggest fan Irving using a shrinking machine, since the house feels too small at full size. Candace, determined to bust them, accidentally shrinks herself in the process. Meanwhile, Doofenshmirtz plants a nanobot on Perry in an attempt to discover where he lives. Baljeet tries to impress a childhood friend visiting from India, enlisting Phineas and Ferb to orchestrate a series of grand romantic gestures. However, she remains unimpressed, revealing she likes Baljeet just the way he is. Meanwhile, a sleep-deprived Doofenshmirtz hatches a plan to relocate the Danville Lighthouse to the other side of town so he can finally get some rest.
40	14	"The Baljeatles"	Robert F. Hughes	Piero Piluso & Jon Colton Barry	Jon Colton Barry	July 25, 2009	214	N/A
40	14	"Vanessassary Roughness"	Robert F. Hughes	Michael Diederich & Perry Zombolas	Scott Peterson	July 25, 2009	214	N/A
Baljeet recruits Phineas and Ferb to help create a song for a summer camp concert. Meanwhile, Candace plays matchmaker by setting Stacy up with Coltrane, all while getting frustrated that Jeremy has not given her a nickname. Elsewhere, Doofenshmirtz plots to create an army of babies by broadcasting his heartbeat across Danville on a loudspeaker. Doofenshmirtz tasks Vanessa with retrieving a container from a mall that holds pizzazium infinionite, a rare element, hoping to prove she is responsible enough for a car, and to experiment with the element himself. However, Perry is on a mission to stop him, Baljeet wants it for a science project, and Candace thinks it is a lantern she can give to Jeremy. Meanwhile, Phineas kicks back in a massage chair while Ferb helps Vanessa with the retrieval.
41	15	"No More Bunny Business"	Zac Moncrief	Sherm Cohen & Chong Lee	Jon Colton Barry	August 1, 2009	215	N/A
41	15	"Spa Day"	Robert F. Hughes	Aliki Theofilopoulos Grafft & Antoine Guilbaud	Jennifer Keene	August 1, 2009	215	N/A
Candace finds a rabbit outside her house and decides to take it in as a pet. However, the rabbit is actually a rogue agent named Dennis, whom Perry is trying to prevent from hacking into O.W.C.A.’s mainframe. Meanwhile, Phineas and Ferb develop actual X-ray glasses after being ripped off by a novelty variety, and due to Perry's absence, Doofenshmirtz appoints a potted plant as his nemesis. Candace becomes sidetracked from a scheduled spa appointment and goes with Stacy to work at a construction site with her because Jeremy is there, and Phineas and Ferb create their own spa to help make up for the missed appointment. Meanwhile, a stray cat Doofenshmirtz takes in as a pet causes chaos in his lab.
42	16	"Bubble Boys"	Zac Moncrief	J. G. Orrantia & Mike Roth	May Chan	October 17, 2009	216	N/A
42	16	"Isabella and the Temple of Sap"	Zac Moncrief	J. G. Orrantia & Mike Roth	May Chan	October 17, 2009	216	N/A
When Phineas and Ferb create the largest and most unpoppable bubble ever, they, the Fireside Girls, Buford and Baljeet get trapped inside it flying around the city. Meanwhile, Candace practices driving and Doofenshmirtz uses a voice-altering cowboy hat to help him spread propaganda through country-and-western music. In a side story of the previous episode, Isabella and her Fireside Girls troop try to retrieve a rare variety of tree sap for Phineas and Ferb's bubble project from an abandoned amusement park. Meanwhile, Pinky the Chihuahua's nemesis Professor Poofenplotz tries to steal a supply of her favorite, but discontinued hair spray. Absent: Doofenshmirtz and Major Monogram
43	17	"Cheer Up Candace"	Robert F. Hughes	Michael Diederich & Perry Zombolas	May Chan	October 24, 2009	217	N/A
43	17	"Fireside Girl Jamboree"	Zac Moncrief	Sherm Cohen & Chong Lee	Jennifer Keene	October 24, 2009	217	N/A
After feeling depressed when Jeremy cancels his date with her, Phineas and Ferb try to cheer Candace up. Meanwhile, Perry is discharged from the agency after he is accused of a series of crimes, only though he later discovers that Doofenshmirtz has framed Perry using various different clones of him. Candace joins the Fireside Girls and tries to get 50 patches in one day so she can get tickets to see a Paisley Sideburn Brothers performance at their jamboree. Meanwhile, Doofenshmirtz tries to halt Fireside Girls cupcake sales by using a device that can turn things into broccoli, including the factory where the cupcakes are made.
44	18	"The Bully Code"	Zac Moncrief	Kim Roberson & Kaz	Martin Olson	October 31, 2009	218	N/A
44	18	"Finding Mary McGuffin"	Robert F. Hughes & Jay Lender	Aliki Theofilopoulos Grafft & Antoine Guilbaud	Jennifer Keene	October 31, 2009	218	N/A
Buford vows to become Baljeet's slave after he saves him from choking. Meanwhile, Candace tries to prevent Jeremy from seeing embarrassing photos she accidentally sent to his cell phone, and Doofenshmirtz plots revenge on an ice cream truck driver who once ran over his foot. When Lawrence accidentally sells Candace's Little Mary McGuffin doll to Doofenshmirtz, who plans to give it to his daughter Vanessa as a gift, Phineas and Ferb take on the case like classic TV detectives. Meanwhile, Doofenshmirtz goes on his own mission to recover a missing on-off switch crucial to his latest invention.
45	19	"What Do It Do?"	Robert F. Hughes & Jay Lender	Jon Colton Barry & Piero Piluso	Martin Olson	November 14, 2009	219	N/A
45	19	"Atlantis"	Zac Moncrief	Kim Roberson & Kaz	Jennifer Keene	November 14, 2009	219	N/A
When one of Doofenshmirtz's inventions lands in their front yard, Phineas and Ferb try to figure out what it does. Meanwhile, Doofenshmirtz and Perry find themselves stuck aboard Doofenshmirtz's malfunctioning hover jet as it spirals out of control with no one steering. On a trip to the beach, Phineas and Ferb discover the lost city of Atlantis. Meanwhile, Candace enters a sandcastle-building contest judged by Jeremy, and Doofenshmirtz attempts to use a growth formula to turn ordinary plants into evil creations.
46	20	"Picture This"	Robert F. Hughes & Jay Lender	Michael Diederich & Kaz	Martin Olson	November 7, 2009	220	N/A
46	20	"Nerdy Dancin'"	Zac Moncrief	J. G. Orrantia & Perry Zombolas	May Chan	November 7, 2009	220	N/A
When Phineas and Ferb invent a teleporter that can retrieve objects from anywhere by scanning photographs, Candace tries to expose it to her mother by teleporting her back from a Mexican-Jewish cultural festival. Meanwhile, Doofenshmirtz sets out to rid the world of mimes by trapping them in real invisible boxes. Jeremy is doubtful about his dancing abilities when he agrees to partner with Candace on the popular television show Let's All Dance Until We're Sick, so Phineas and Ferb create an exoskeleton that allows Ferb to control Jeremy's movements. Meanwhile, Doofenshmirtz and his group of fellow mad scientists hatch a plan to hijack the show and broadcast an evil message.
47	21	"I Was a Middle Aged Robot"	Zac Moncrief	Sherm Cohen & Chong Lee	Martin Olson	February 13, 2010	221	N/A
47	21	"Suddenly Suzy"	Jay Lender & Robert F. Hughes	Aliki Theofilopoulos Grafft & Antoine Guilbaud	Martin Olson & May Chan	February 13, 2010	221	N/A
When Lawrence accidentally has his memory erased by a gadget in Perry’s lair just before a father-daughter race with Candace, Perry uses a robot version of Lawrence to fill in for him. Meanwhile, Doofenshmirtz invents "Eulg," a substance that works opposite of glue, breaking things apart rather than sticking them together. Candace inadvertently agrees to babysit Jeremy's little sister, Suzy, and the two team up in an attempt to bust the boys. Meanwhile, Phineas, Ferb, and their friends build a replica of Niagara Falls and ride a barrel over it. At the same time, Doofenshmirtz constructs a giant foot out of carbon paper, convinced it will increase his carbon footprint.
48	22	"Phineas and Ferb Christmas Vacation!" (Note: This episode is a 45-minute special.)	Zac Moncrief	Jon Colton Barry & Piero Piluso	Jon Colton Barry & Scott Peterson	December 6, 2009	222	N/A
After Phineas, Ferb, and their friends help decorate the city of Danville to celebrate the arrival of Santa Claus, Doofenshmirtz, having finally found a reason to hate Christmas, uses his "Naughty-inator" in an attempt to ruin the holidays for everyone. As a result, the boys and their friends try to help save Christmas for Danville. Guest stars: Clancy Brown as Santa Claus and Big Bad Voodoo Daddy as themselves
49	23	"Undercover Carl"	Zac Moncrief	Chong Suk Lee & Sherm Cohen	May Chan & Martin Olson	February 13, 2010	223	N/A
49	23	"Hip Hip Parade"	Zac Moncrief & Robert F. Hughes	J. G. Orrantia & Perry Zombolas	May Chan	February 13, 2010	223	N/A
When Phineas and Ferb build an Anti-Gravity Fun Launcher, Carl stumbles upon their plans online and mistakenly believes they are working for Doofenshmirtz, prompting him to go undercover. Meanwhile, Doofenshmirtz gets his hands on the plans and tries to put them to evil use, while Perry is sent on a literal wild goose chase to retrieve a missing agent, deemed too close to the boys to investigate them himself. Phineas and Ferb help the neighborhood kids build floats for the annual "Tri-State Area Unification Day" parade, but Buford, motivated by a long-standing family grudge, plots to sabotage it. Meanwhile, Candace struggles to ignore her brothers' antics during a promised mother-daughter day with Linda, and Doofenshmirtz attempts to create massive traffic jams using a duplication device.
50	24	"Just Passing Through"	Zac Moncrief	Edgar Karapetyan & Kim Roberson	Martin Olson	February 6, 2010	224	N/A
50	24	"Candace's Big Day"	Robert F. Hughes & Jay Lender	Aliki Theofilopoulos Grafft & Antoine Guilbaud	Jennifer Keene	February 6, 2010	224	N/A
When Phineas and Ferb invent a high-tech orb that allows its user to pass through solid objects in order to help find Linda's lucky guitar pick, Candace tries to use it as a way to finally bust her brothers. Meanwhile, Doofenshmirtz plots to destroy a statue honoring Roger. Candace is thrilled to be the bridesmaid at her Aunt Tiana's wedding, but when it gets moved to the backyard, Phineas and Ferb's wild preparations threaten to ruin Candace's vision for the perfect wedding. Meanwhile, Doofenshmirtz builds a device to turn all the food in Danville into junk food, believing that overweight people will be easier to control.
51	25	"Invasion of the Ferb Snatchers"	Zac Moncrief	J. G. Orrantia & Perry Zombolas	Jennifer Keene & Martin Olson	February 20, 2010	225	N/A
51	25	"Ain't No Kiddie Ride"	Zac Moncrief	Sherm Cohen & Chong Suk Lee	Jennifer Keene & Martin Olson	February 20, 2010	225	N/A
After binge-watching a sci-fi movie marathon, Candace becomes convinced that Ferb is secretly an alien. Meanwhile, Doofenshmirtz tries to auction off one of his old inventions, the "Wrapped-Up-In-A-Nice-Little-Bow-inator", which compresses objects into small wrapped boxes—by marketing it as a cleaning device. Phineas and Ferb decide to trick out the kiddie rides in front of the Tri-State Mart, but when Candace steps into the rocket ride and is unexpectedly blasted across Danville, the gang embarks on a rescue mission to save her. Meanwhile, Doofenshmirtz buys all of the aerosol cans in the Tri-State Area and makes an "Ozone Deplete-Inator" to burn his name into the atmosphere so people will remember it.
52	26	"Wizard of Odd"	Jay Lender & Robert F. Hughes	Michael Diederich & Kaz	Scott Peterson	September 24, 2010 (Note: Beginning with this episode, new episodes premiered on Disney Channel prior to Disney XD.)	226	3.07
In order to wash their house quickly, Phineas and Ferb build a contraption that spins it around, causing Candace to collapse. She soon finds herself in a dream world reminiscent of The Wizard of Oz. Following the yellow brick sidewalk to Bustopolis, Candace seeks out the Wizard to help her bust her brothers, only to discover that evil forces are after the magical boots that have mysteriously grown on her feet.
53	27	"The Beak"	Jeff "Swampy" Marsh & Jay Lender	Jon Colton Barry & Piero Piluso	Scott Peterson	March 8, 2010	227	N/A
Phineas and Ferb build an indestructible suit to navigate an extremely dangerous obstacle course, but after using it to help someone, they are mistaken for a superhero and decide to become "The Beak" to fight crime. However, things are not all smooth sailing: a new villain, Khaka Peü Peü, arrives in Danville to challenge them, and Phineas's constant disappearances to fight crime as The Beak begin to strain his friendship with Isabella. Meanwhile, out of fear of being blamed for the supervillain catastrophe, Roger appoints his brother mayor for the day. Doofenshmirtz tries to take advantage of his newfound power but quickly discovers the responsibilities are harder than expected. Guest stars: Ben Stiller as Khaka Peü Peü, Christine Taylor as Mrs. Khaka Peü Peü, and John O'Hurley as Roger Doofenshmirtz
54	28	"Not Phineas and Ferb"	Zac Moncrief	Kim Roberson & Kaz	Martin Olson	February 27, 2010	228	N/A
54	28	"Phineas and Ferb-Busters!"	Jay Lender	Aliki Theofilopoulos Grafft & Antoine Guilbaud	Scott Peterson	February 27, 2010	228	N/A
Irving's older brother, Albert, does not believe Phineas and Ferb are anything special and insists he can prove it. Determined to prove him wrong, Irving convinces Baljeet and Buford to pose as the boys while the real Phineas and Ferb are at the movies with their dad. Meanwhile, Doofenshmirtz, frustrated with the poor quality of accessories for his model train set, decides to shrink various national monuments to add to his collection. Candace enlists Stacy and Jenny to help her bust Phineas and Ferb, who are busy building giant mechanical spinning tops. Meanwhile, Doofenshmirtz tests a new robot to replace Norm, but a power surge from the boys' invention causes it to malfunction and turn against him.
55	29	"The Lizard Whisperer"	Zac Moncrief	Sherm Cohen & Chong Suk Lee	May Chan, Jennifer Keene & Martin Olson	March 6, 2010	229	N/A
55	29	"Robot Rodeo"	Jay Lender	Kaz & J. G. Orrantia	May Chan	March 6, 2010	229	N/A
Phineas and Ferb discover a chameleon and decide to keep it as a pet, but when it grows to a gigantic size due to one of Doofenshmirtz's inventions, the boys and Isabella struggle to track it down, especially with its camouflage. Meanwhile, Doofenshmirtz takes a guitar lesson from Jeremy to learn a song that will summon aliens to do his bidding. Phineas and Ferb host a backyard rodeo featuring robotic bulls to help Isabella's Fireside Girls earn their Rodeo Clown Patch, while Candace tries to stay focused so she can make it to a concert with Stacy. Meanwhile, Doofenshmirtz competes against members of L.O.V.E.M.U.F.F.I.N. in an Inator Creator contest.
56	30	"The Secret of Success"	Zac Moncrief	Kim Roberson & Kaz	May Chan & Jennifer Keene	October 8, 2010 (Note: "The Doof Side of the Moon" was first released on A Very Perry Christmas DVD on October 5, 2010.)	230	N/A
56	30	"The Doof Side of the Moon"	Jay Lender	Edgar Karapetyan & Bernie Petterson	Jon Colton Barry & Martin Olson	October 8, 2010	230	N/A
Phineas and Ferb build an advanced all-terrain vehicle, while Baljeet, Stacy, and Candace attend a convention where Candace hopes to improve her "busting tactics." Meanwhile, Doofenshmirtz attempts to host a Telethon of Evil. Phineas and Ferb build the tallest building ever to increase Danville's popularity, while Candace enlists the help of Irving's brother, Albert, to bust them. Meanwhile, Doofenshmirtz attempts to rotate the moon to its dark side in an effort to become the most evil man in the world.
57	31	"She's the Mayor"	Zac Moncrief	Michael Diederich & Perry Zombolas	Jennifer Keene & Martin Olson	June 14, 2010	231	N/A
57	31	"The Lemonade Stand"	Jay Lender	Aliki Theofilopoulos Grafft & Antoine Guilbaud	May Chan	June 14, 2010	231	N/A
Candace becomes mayor of Danville for a day after winning an essay contest, but she abuses her newfound power by creating laws that can assist her with busting her brothers. Meanwhile, Phineas and Ferb build an authentic log cabin and pioneer village using only tools from the past. Elsewhere, Doofenshmirtz is set to play golf with his brother Roger, but since he hates the game, he invents an "Accelerate-inator" to speed things along. Phineas and Ferb build a lemonade stand, which quickly catches on and becomes franchised throughout Danville. Meanwhile, Candace's relationship with Stacy is put to the test as she struggles to choose between their friendship and her mission to bust her brothers. Elsewhere, Doofenshmirtz creates a "Paper-Cut-Inator" in hopes of making millions by selling Band-Aids.
58	32	"We Call It Maze"	Zac Moncrief	Bernie Petterson & Chong Suk Lee	Jennifer Keene	October 1, 2010	232	4.35
58	32	"Ladies and Gentlemen, Meet Max Modem!"	Jay Lender	J. G. Orrantia & Kaz	Scott Peterson	October 1, 2010	232	4.35
Phineas and Ferb build a three-story interactive maze with fun, challenging obstacles, while Isabella mentors a Junior Fireside Girl, Melissa, who unexpectedly bonds with Candace, much to Isabella's dismay. Meanwhile, Doofenshmirtz plans to tilt all buildings in the Tri-State Area like the Leaning Tower of Pisa, financing an even bigger plot to tilt every building in the world. When Linda is invited to revive her pop star persona, Lindana, at an '80s reunion concert, Lawrence worries she will start missing the excitement of her past life, and grow bored with him. To prove he can be just as thrilling, he asks Phineas and Ferb to reinvent him as Max Modem, a fictional '80s singer. Meanwhile, Doofenshmirtz stages a fake alien invasion as part of his latest plot to take over the Tri-State Area.
59	33	"Nerds of a Feather"	Jay Lender	Jon Colton Barry & Piero Piluso	Jon Colton Barry	August 16, 2010	233	N/A
Phineas and Ferb attend the Tri-State Area's annual sci-fi/fantasy convention to meet their hero, special effects artist Clive Addison. However, their plans take a detour when they get caught in the middle of a rivalry between Buford and Baljeet, each leading their own fan groups of fantasy fans and sci-fi geeks. Meanwhile, Candace struggles to keep her secret love for the children's show Ducky Momo under wraps. Elsewhere, Doofenshmirtz kidnaps TV executive Jeff McGarland in a bid to pitch his new show, Doof 'n' Puss. Guest stars: Kevin Smith as Clive Addison, John O'Hurley as Roger Doofenshmirtz, and Seth MacFarlane as Jeff McGarland
60	34	"Phineas and Ferb Hawaiian Vacation"	Zac Moncrief	Kaz & Kim Roberson	Jennifer Keene	July 9, 2010 (Note: This episode premiered on Disney Channel prior to Disney XD. This episode premiered on Disney XD on July 12, 2010.)	234	2.95
60	34	"Phineas and Ferb Hawaiian Vacation"	Zac Moncrief	Michael Diederich & Perry Zombolas	May Chan & Jennifer Keene	July 9, 2010	234	2.95
In a two-part episode, the Flynn-Fletchers go on a vacation in Hawaii. In part one, Phineas and Ferb create living sea creatures, drawing the ire of the resort manager, while Doofenshmirtz builds a "De-Evolution-inator" to revert Earth to a primitive state. In part two, the boys help Candace get rid of a "cursed" pendant, and Perry finds himself stranded on a deserted island with Doofenshmirtz. Guest stars: Laird Hamilton as himself, Phill Lewis as the Hawaiian hotel manager, and Allie MacKay as a yoga instructor
61	35	"Split Personality"	Jay Lender	Aliki Theofilopoulos Grafft & Antoine Guilbaud	Jennifer Keene, Lance LeCompte & Scott Peterson	October 29, 2010	235	N/A
61	35	"Brain Drain"	Jay Lender	J. G. Orrantia & Kaz	Martin Olson	October 29, 2010	235	N/A
Phineas and Ferb create a machine that splits objects into their component parts, but when Candace is exposed to it, she is divided into two versions: one focused on busting her brothers, and the other obsessed with Jeremy. Meanwhile, Doofenshmirtz attempts to overcome his irrational childhood fear of jumping off a high diving board, an important rite of passage in his hometown that he once failed, and uses his "Look-away-inator" to make sure no one sees him. When Phineas, Ferb, and their friends, except Buford, come down with colds, they spend the day in bed playing a custom fighting game. Meanwhile, Doofenshmirtz uses a mind-control helmet to mess with Perry but ends up stealing the show at a junkyard rave Vanessa is attending.
62	36	"Make Play"	Zac Moncrief	Bernie Petterson & Edgar Karapetyan	May Chan	February 11, 2011	236	N/A
62	36	"Candace Gets Busted"	Zac Moncrief	Kim Roberson & Kaz	Scott Peterson	February 11, 2011	236	N/A
Candace swaps places with a princess who looks exactly like her, hoping to enjoy a day of royal luxuries, but Phineas and Ferb's ongoing antics keep getting in the way. Meanwhile, the boys recruit the princess to help them build a giant jukebox featuring live bands, and Doofenshmirtz attempts to sabotage his brother's dedication of the new Danville Opera House using his "Claw-inator". When Linda and Lawrence go on a trip, Candace plans a small "intimate get-together" with Stacy and Jenny, but things quickly spiral out of control as more uninvited guests show up, turning it into a full-blown party, breaking Linda's rule against wild parties. Meanwhile, Doofenshmirtz creates an "-inator" to remove the condos blocking his view of the nearby free drive-in theater. Guest stars: Sophia Bush as Sara, Pamela Adlon as White Blonde Haired Girl, Candi Milo as Ducky Momo Kiosk Girl, and Greg Germann as Teenage Boy #1
63	37	"Phineas and Ferb: Summer Belongs to You!" (Note: This episode is a one-hour special.)	Robert F. Hughes & Dan Povenmire	Dan Povenmire, Robert F. Hughes, Kyle Menke, Kim Roberson, Mike Diederich, Aliki Theofilopoulos Grafft, Antoine Guilbaud, Kaz, J. G. Orrantia, Mike Roth & Perry Zombolas	Dan Povenmire & Jeff "Swampy" Marsh	August 2, 2010	237	3.86
64	38	"Phineas and Ferb: Summer Belongs to You!"	Robert F. Hughes & Dan Povenmire	Dan Povenmire, Robert F. Hughes, Kyle Menke, Kim Roberson, Mike Diederich, Aliki Theofilopoulos Grafft, Antoine Guilbaud, Kaz, J. G. Orrantia, Mike Roth & Perry Zombolas	Dan Povenmire & Jeff "Swampy" Marsh	August 2, 2010	238	3.86
On the summer solstice, Phineas, Ferb, and their friends decide to embark on a journey around the world in a single day to create the "largest, longest, funnest summer day of all time." However, not everyone believes they can pull it off, especially Buford. Candace joins them because Jeremy is on a trip to Paris, and she is worried he might meet other girls. Meanwhile, Isabella's feelings for Phineas are put to the test as his single-minded focus on achieving their goal creates tension between them. Meanwhile, Doofenshmirtz takes a father-daughter trip to Tokyo with Vanessa, but when she joins Phineas and the gang, he teams up with Perry and Major Monogram to find her. Guest stars: Chaka Khan and Clay Aiken as themselves
65	39	"Rollercoaster: The Musical!"	Dan Povenmire & Robert F. Hughes	Written by : May Chan, Jennifer Keene, Martin Olson & Scott Peterson; Storyboarded by : Flammarion Ferreira, Wendy Grieb, Robert F. Hughes, Chris Headrick & Chong Lee	Dan Povenmire & Jeff "Swampy" Marsh	January 29, 2011	239	N/A
Phineas and Ferb relive the day they built a rollercoaster as a musical. Meanwhile, Doofenshmirtz attempts to reverse the rotation of the Earth once again. Guest star: Kenny Ortega as himself

== Ratings ==
The episodes "Perry Lays an Egg" and "Gaming the System" on the Disney Channel achieved the most views by ages 6–11 and 9–14 of any channel in that night's time slot. This achievement propelled the series to the number one animated telecast that week for the target demographics. On June 7, 2009, Disney announced that the show had become the number one prime-time animated television show for the demographics 6–11 and 9–14.

The premiere of "Phineas and Ferb Christmas Vacation" garnered 2.62 million viewers during its debut on Disney XD, the most watched telecast in the channel's history (including Toon Disney) and the number three program of the night in all demographics. It received 5.2 million viewers for its debut on Disney Channel. It was the highest rated episode of the series to date.

The premiere of "Phineas and Ferb: Summer Belongs To You!" garnered 3.862 million viewers, was watched by 22% of kids 2–11, 13% of teens 12–17, 5% of households, and 3% of adults 18–49, also being the #1 program on that night and it was 25th for the week in viewership. On Disney XD, the episode ranked in the channel's top 3 telecasts of the year in viewers with 1.32 million, and Boys 6–11 with 365,000, with a 2.9 rating. The hour telecast on August 2, 2010, is currently the Emmy-winning animated series' No. 2 telecast of all time on Disney XD in Total Viewers, in kids 6–14 with 677,000 and a 1.9 rating, Boys 6–14 with 435,000 and a 2.3 rating, and kids 6–11 with 542,000 and a 2.2 rating, Boys 6–11 and Boys 9–14 235,000 with a 1.9 rating, behind only December 2009's "Phineas and Ferb Christmas Vacation".

== DVD releases ==
Season	Episodes	Release dates
Season	Episodes	Region 1
2	65	A Very Perry Christmas: October 5, 2010; Episodes: "Interview With a Platypus" (49), "Chez Platypus" (56), "Perry Lays an Egg" (57), "Oh, There You Are, Perry" (64), "Phineas and Ferb Christmas Vacation" (84) and "The Doof Side of the Moon" (107) Across the Second Dimension: August 23, 2011; Episodes: "Attack of the 50-Foot Sister" (51) The Perry Files: June 5, 2012; Episodes: "No More Bunny Business" (70), "Spa Day" (71), "Split Personality" (108) and "Brain Drain" (109) The Perry Files – Animal Agents: February 26, 2013; Episodes: "Vanessassary Roughness" (69), "Isabella and the Temple of Sap" (75), "Cheer Up Candace" (76) and "Robot Rodeo" (96)

== Bibliography ==
- "Phineas and Ferb Season 2 episodes". TV Guide. Archived from the original on August 17, 2010.
- "Phineas and Ferb: Episode Guide". MSN TV. Archived from the original on March 8, 2011.
