= Phineas and Ferb: Summer Belongs to You! =

- Phineas and Ferb episodes
- Episode nos.: Season 2 Episodes 37 and 38
- Directed by: Robert F. Hughes; Dan Povenmire
- Written by: Dan Povenmire; Robert F. Hughes; Kyle Menke; Kim Roberson; Mike Diederich; Aliki Theofilopoulos Grafft; Antoine Guilbaud; Kaz; Joe Orrantia; Mike Roth; Perry Zombolas
- Story by: Dan Povenmire; Jeff "Swampy" Marsh
- Production code: 237–238
- Original air dates: August 2, 2010 (Disney XD); August 6, 2010 (Disney Channel)

Guest appearances
- Clay Aiken as himself; Chaka Khan as herself; Brian George as Uncle Sabu

Episode chronology
← Previous "Phineas and Ferb Hawaiian Vacation"	Next → "Nerds of a Feather"
- Phineas and Ferb season 2

"Phineas and Ferb: Summer Belongs to You!" is the first one-hour special of the animated television series Phineas and Ferb, produced under the 37th and 38th half-hour episodes of the second season, the 54th episode segment to be broadcast, and the 63rd and 64th episodes overall. It aired on Disney XD on August 2, 2010. It is longer than "Phineas and Ferb Christmas Vacation", which is 45 minutes long. This episode was first seen at San Diego Comic-Con on July 25, 2010.

== Plot ==
Phineas feels bored after he and Ferb have accomplished much throughout the summer. For a taste of adventure, the duo and their friends decide to travel around the world at the same speed as the Earth's rotation, so as to make a complete 24-hour day, in an effort to create the "biggest, longest, funnest summer day of all time".

Meanwhile, Dr. Doofenshmirtz takes a trip to Tokyo with Vanessa. At first, Vanessa is amazed, but is later distraught to find out that her father has brought in a captured Major Monogram and has been making a plan to ruin the International Good Guy Convention with a giant water balloon and frame Monogram for it. She then accuses her father of always putting his work before her relationship with him, and decides to leave for Paris on her own. Around the same time, Perry the Platypus catches wind of Monogram's whereabouts after Carl warns him of a suspicious note sent to the O.W.C.A. (presumably sent by Doof).

In Tokyo, the gang meets with Stacy's cousins while getting vegetable oil used as fuel. While there, Vanessa joins with the group after being accidentally knocked off the Tokyo Tower by the giant balloon thanks to the intervention of Perry, who arrives at the tower. Fearing for Vanessa's safety, Doof abandons his plan and opts to rescue her by compelling Perry and Monogram to help him out, so they travel aboard Perry's platypus-shaped hovercar.

The group, along with Vanessa, then crashes on the Indian portion of the Himalayas, and their plane loses its wings. Phineas and the other kids go see Baljeet's grand-uncle Sabu, who runs a rubber band/rubber ball factory there. He sings "Rubber Bands" as he shows the kids around the factory. This gives them an idea: namely, to attach a bouncy rubber ball to the bottom of the plane so they could travel their way to Paris and back home. As they travel around the world in their newly-fixed way of transport, the song "Bouncin' Around The World" is heard.

In Paris, known to Isabella as "the city of love", Candace sees Jeremy with a bunch of boys and girls and leaves. Isabella is upset as Phineas is completely oblivious to her feelings for him, since what he cares about the most is getting the craft refixed. On the top of the Eiffel Tower, Ferb consults with a depressed Vanessa about her relationship with her father, telling her to try and meet him halfway in their relationship by socializing more. Ferb walks away for a moment just as Doof, Perry, and Monogram come to rescue her. Vanessa is initially upset at her father bringing 'work' again, but Doof complains of all the trouble and the help he needed from Perry and Monogram to travel halfway around the world to rescue Vanessa for her sake. This convinces Vanessa to leave her father while bidding farewell to Ferb, who was about to give her a rose.The group later leaves Paris, but the boat disintegrates leaving only the seats. They crash on a deserted island, which possesses only two palm trees and a big fat ox.

Meanwhile, back in Paris, Monogram and Perry attempt to arrest Doof, but Vanessa stops them and escapes with her father in Perry's hovercraft, leaving Doof to take genuine pride in Vanessa's rare act of evil. Monogram decides to put this behind by taking in a revue, leaving an upset Perry behind. Back on the isle, Phineas, after a desperate attempt to find a way off the island, finally gives up and sits down to watch the sunset with Isabella like she wants, but she encourages him and he gets the idea to use Ferb's giant map as a massive paper airplane. The group launch and ride the paper airplane back to Danville, where there is a huge ditch due to road construction, with their neighborhood at the other side. With one minute left, Buford gives everyone back their bikes, which he stole before the events of the episode. He never stole Candace's bike, so she had to ride a green tricycle; and the group is able to jump the pit using a makeshift ramp and arrive home with a second to spare. The parents arrive home too, but for once, Candace says nothing as she enjoyed herself. As everyone sings "Summer Belongs to You", Jeremy comes home early and kisses Candace, calling her his girlfriend. Though it seems that everything worked out well for everyone for the day, Phineas wonders where Perry might be, as Perry is last seen dating a woman at a restaurant in Paris.

== Production ==
According to co-director Robert F. Hughes, the special was initially conceived as a television movie, but due to story issues, it was reduced to an hour-long special. The proposed film eventually became Phineas and Ferb The Movie: Across the 2nd Dimension.

== Cultural references ==
During the song "City of Love", Phineas can briefly be seen standing in front of the famous French Cabaret, Moulin Rouge while holding a pinwheel, most likely envisioning the use of the windmill on top as a propeller.

During the song "J Pop (Welcome to Tokyo)", Stacy's relatives encourage Phineas and others to participate in a dance similar to the popular Swedish dance song Caramelldansen. In one part of the song, Isabella is seen waving a leek in her hand, similarly to Loituma Girl in the popular video known as "Leekspin" on YouTube.

In the end of the episode when they were stuck on the desert island, Phineas is seen digging up a yellow sponge and a pink starfish in the episode, as a reference to SpongeBob SquarePants.

== Reception ==
When the episode premiered on Disney Channel on August 6, 2010, it was seen by 3.862 million viewers, and earned a 5.0 rating in the Kids 2-11 demographic. It was the #1 program on that night and 25th for the week in viewership. When the episode premiered on Disney XD, the episode ranked in the channel's top 3 telecasts of the year in viewers with 1.32 million, and Boys 6–11 with 365,000, with a 2.9 rating. The telecast was the No. 2 telecast of all time on Disney XD in Total Viewers, in kids 6–14 with 677,000 and a 1.9 rating, Boys 6–14 with 435,000 and a 2.3 rating, kids 6–11 with 542,000 and a 2.2 rating, and in Boys 6–11 and Boys 9–14 with 235,000 and a 1.9 rating, behind only "Phineas and Ferb Christmas Vacation".
