= Phineas and Ferb Christmas Vacation =

- Phineas and Ferb episode
- Episode no.: Season 2 Episode 22
- Directed by: Zac Moncrief
- Written by: Jon Colton Barry (story, storyboard); Scott Peterson (story); Piero Piluso (storyboard)
- Production code: 222
- Original air dates: December 6, 2009 (alternate short version); December 4, 2010 (extended version)

Guest appearances
- Clancy Brown as Santa Claus; Malcolm McDowell as Grandpa Reg; Jane Carr as Grandma Winnifred; Mathew Horne as Blay’n; Bruce Mackinnon as Clewn't; Big Bad Voodoo Daddy as themselves

Episode chronology
← Previous "Atlantis"	Next → "Just Passing Through"
- Phineas and Ferb (season 2)

"Phineas and Ferb Christmas Vacation" is a special Christmas-themed episode of the animated television series Phineas and Ferb. The episode was originally broadcast on Disney XD on December 6, 2009. The special's narrative, set after the events of the series, follows protagonists Phineas and Ferb decorating their city for the arrival of Santa Claus. But when the evil mad scientist Dr. Heinz Doofenshmirtz uses a machine to ruin the holiday, Phineas and Ferb must find a way to fix it and save Christmas. The episode serves as the 22nd episode of the second season, the 37th episode segment of the season to be broadcast, as well as the 48th episode overall.

"Phineas and Ferb Christmas Vacation" was written by Jon Colton Barry and Scott Peterson and directed by Zac Moncrief, who had been nominated for a 2009 Emmy award for his work on the episode "The Monster of Phineas-n-Ferbenstein" a few months before the special aired. It serves as a realization of a dream series co-creators Jeff "Swampy" Marsh and Dan Povenmire to have their own Christmas special, something they desired since their creation of the series. The special featured multiple guest stars including Clancy Brown, Malcolm McDowell, Jane Carr, Mathew Horne, and Bruce Mackinnon, and detailed seven original songs, including one performed by swing band Big Bad Voodoo Daddy.

"Phineas and Ferb's Christmas Vacation" received a large and widespread release from The Walt Disney Company, who showed optimism on it and promoted it through interviews and special broadcasts. When the episode premiered on Disney XD, it received 2.62 million viewers, ranking as the number 3 telecast in the night across all demographics. When the episode premiered on Disney Channel on December 11, 2009, it ranked as the number five program of the week with 5.213 million viewers. Critical reception from television critics and various media outlets was generally positive. It is also the first episode not to be set during the summer.

== Plot ==
On Christmas Eve, Lawrence and Linda are stuck at the airport waiting for Lawrence's parents to arrive from England. Phineas and Ferb convert the top of their house into a large, extravagant rest stop for Santa Claus, complete with a sauna, massage table, satellite TV, elliptical center to work off milk and cookies, milk and cookies, special reindeer feeding center, and beard purifier. They urge everyone in Danville to help decorate the entire city for Christmas and they follow, happily spreading cheer along the way. Candace (who has sneered at the boys for still writing letters to Santa, declaring it childish), however, is busy trying to figure out the perfect present for her boyfriend Jeremy, and the song "What Does He Want" plays in the extended edition of the episode.

Meanwhile, Perry the Platypus sneaks off to attend a Christmas party his organization, OWCA is throwing. After receiving a Sal Tuscany CD from his "Secret Santa," he is given an emergency danger alert that Dr. Heinz Doofenshmirtz is up to something nefarious. He darts off to the doctor's evil lair and is trapped in Christmas lights, topped off with a partridge. Doofenshmirtz reveals that his uncle has sent him a special "Naughty-inator," a device that can ruin Christmas—his dilemma is that he simply does not dislike the holiday and is unsure if he should use it, but after carolers begin harassing him with "We Wish You a Merry Christmas" (especially the part where they demand figgy pudding and "won't go until [they] get some"), he activates the machine.

The "Naughty-inator" causes the Naughty or Nice list at Santa's workshop in the North Pole to brand everyone in Danville as "naughty," therefore canceling the holiday for the people of the town. Phineas, Ferb, and their friends are all completely distraught and decide to broadcast a song about why Danville should be branded "nice" to radios at the North Pole; two elves receive the broadcast and decide to go down to the city to investigate what caused the mishap. Meanwhile, Candace continues to unsuccessfully try to get Jeremy to hint at his perfect gift, merely baffling the boy.

The elves—named Blayn't and Clewn't—finally arrive in Danville and inform the boys that it appears that it is the city itself, not the people, that is "naughty" and they are unsure why. Doofenshmirtz, meanwhile, decides to put in Perry's Sal Tuscany CD in his stereo and when Tuscany on the radio sings "Christmas cannot be destroyed, not even by a Naughtyinator!", the loud vibrations destroy the "Naughty-inator," causing Christmas cheer to return to Danville and removing the "naughty" brand from everyone.

The elves inform the kids that it is too late to clear up the misunderstanding with Santa, meaning Santa cannot come to Danville. Phineas and Ferb, not ready to give up yet, see their opportunity to save the holiday and decide to create a flying sleigh, along with help from Blanyn't, Clewn't, Isabella, Baljeet, Buford and (amazingly) Candace to deliver presents made by the two elves at record speed to every house in the city. They almost fail at doing so, as it is too dark to see anything, and when one of the presents gets jammed in the "present cannon" Baljeet fixes it but in the process is shot out of the cannon and flies through the sky and down the chimney with the present into his friend's house where he gets his Christmas wish: a kiss underneath the mistletoe from a girl.

Buford (who had been on the "Naughty" list) gets everyone in the city to turn on their Christmas lights, putting him on the "Nice" list in the process. They finally succeed and everyone in town gets a present. Meanwhile, Perry has managed to escape and wrap Doofenshmirtz in his own Christmas lights trap, causing him (to his delight) to finally have the ability to hate Christmas. When the gang return to the Flynn-Fletcher house, they find that Santa has come to the city and just finished using their rest stop. He thanks Phineas for taking care of deliveries for the city and flies off with the rest stop hitched to his sleigh.

Doofenshmirtz, similarly, smashes the Sal Tuscany CD in rage and discovers that it is actually a gift from Santa Claus himself, as "A Sal Tuscany" is an anagram of Santa Claus, with "an embarrassing left over 'Y' at the end". This made Doofenshmirtz realize that Santa was the one who sent him the plans for the Naughty-inator as part of Santa's plan to grant Doof's wish of the ability to hate Christmas, though Doof actually sees it as a reason to celebrate the holidays, much to his delight. In a style similar to "The Gift of the Magi", Candace sells her necklace that she was planning on trading for earrings to get Jeremy a new guitar and Jeremy sells his old guitar that he was planning on trading for a new one to get Candace the earrings she wanted. In the end, Lawrence and Linda finally return home with the children's grandparents, and everyone opens up their presents ... even Doofenshmirtz gets a present from Perry: his favorite almond brittle.

== Cast ==
- Vincent Martella as Phineas Flynn
- Ashley Tisdale as Candace Flynn
- Alyson Stoner as Isabella Garcia-Shapiro
- Thomas Sangster as Ferb Fletcher
- Maulik Pancholy as Baljeet Tjinder
- Bobby Gaylor as Buford Van Stomm
- Dan Povenmire as Dr. Heinz Doofenshmirtz
- Jeff "Swampy" Marsh as Major Monogram
- Tyler Mann as Carl
- Mitchel Musso as Jeremy Johnson
- Dee Bradley Baker as Perry the Platypus
- Clancy Brown as Santa Claus
- Malcolm McDowell as Grandpa Reg
- Jane Carr as Grandma Winnifred
- Mathew Horne as Blay’n
- Bruce Mackinnon as Clewn't
- Big Bad Voodoo Daddy as themselves

== Production ==
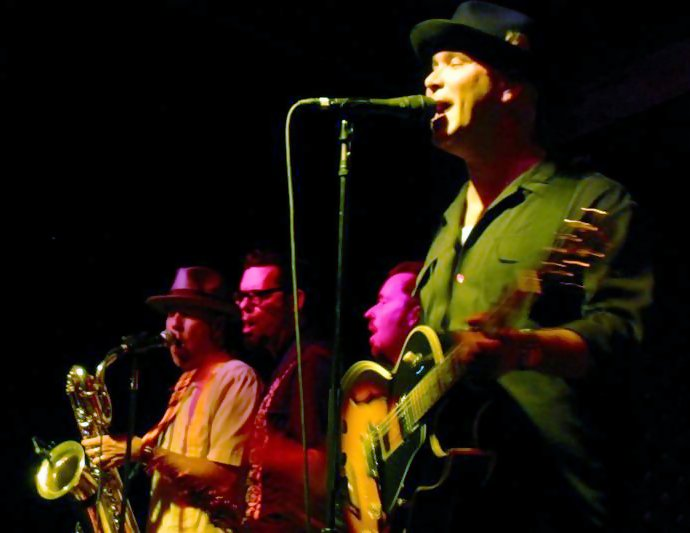
Big Bad Voodoo Daddy contributed to the soundtrack of the episode.

In an interview with the Orange County Register, "Phineas and Ferb's Christmas Vacation" was described by co-creator Dan Povenmire as being a "really sweet, warm special that we're really proud to have our name on." seven new original songs were written for the episode, to be performed by swing group Big Bad Voodoo Daddy, songs that Povenmire hope children will think as Christmas songs as much as classics such as "Rudolph the Red-Nosed Reindeer."

Producer Zac Moncrief has also made high hopes for the episode, hoping that it will become an instant holiday classic.

=== Release and promotion ===
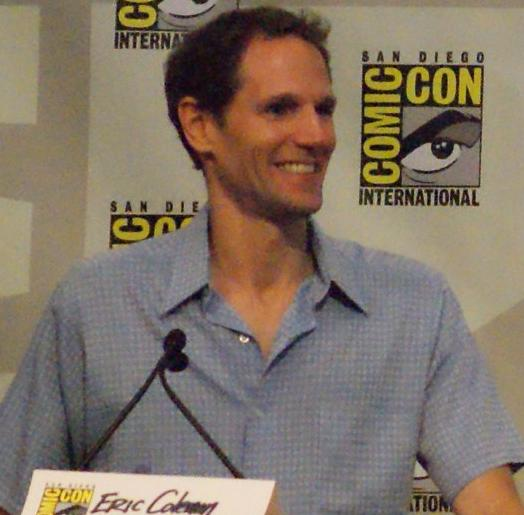
Eric Coleman urged people to watch the special because it had "a strong theme of gratitude, plus the comedy, great music and smart writing fans have come to expect from 'Phineas and Ferb.'"

The episode was promoted through the use of multiple platforms, including premiering the music from the special in a broadcast on Radio Disney on November 17, 2009, followed by premiere airings on Disney XD, Disney Channel, and ABC Family, and the availability of the episode after its airing on video on demand systems, mobile platforms, the Xbox Live Marketplace, and the iTunes Store. The special's broadcast on Disney XD was preceded by an all-weekend marathon of the show, while the special's broadcast on Disney Channel was preceded by a six-hour marathon entitled "Doof's Dastardly Schemes". A DVD of the special was released October 5, 2010 along with four other episodes from the series. The series made its broadcast television debut on ABC on December 24, 2010.

== Alternate versions ==
On December 6, 2010, an alternate version of the episode aired on Disney XD Germany. This version contains songs from the Phineas and Ferb Holiday Favorites. The episode has the same plot as the original. An extended edition premiered in December 2010 on Disney Channel and Disney XD, containing the extra song "What Does He Want?"

== International release ==
This episode premiered on Disney XD (UK & Ireland) on December 7, 2009. The extended version premiered on Family Channel, Canada on December 4, 2010, on Disney XD (UK & Ireland) on December 6, 2010, and on December 18, 2010 on Disney Channel Asia.

== See also ==
- List of Christmas films
