= Robert F. Hughes =

American television director

- Born: Robert Forrest Hughes
- Occupation: Television director
- Years active: 1993–present

Robert Forrest Hughes is an American television director who worked on shows including The Angry Beavers and Rocko's Modern Life. He was a producer and one of the directors on Phineas and Ferb. On January 26, 2015, he announced he was leaving Phineas and Ferb for a job at Warner Bros. Television Animation. However, he soon returned to Disney to work on Milo Murphy's Law, a new series from Phineas and Ferb creators Dan Povenmire and Jeff "Swampy" Marsh.
