= Don't Bump the Glump! =

Book by Shel Silverstein

- First edition cover
- Author: Shel Silverstein
- Original title: Uncle Shelby's Zoo: Don't Bump the Glump! and Other Fantasies
- Genre: Children's picture book Children's poetry
- Publisher: Simon & Schuster (US), W. H. Allen (UK)
- Publication date: 1964
- ISBN: 978-0-545-11072-3 (2008 reissue edition, HarperCollins)
- Followed by: Who Wants a Cheap Rhinoceros?

Don't Bump the Glump! and Other Fantasies is a children's book written and illustrated by Shel Silverstein. His first book of verse, and the only one to feature full color illustrations, it was originally published in 1964 by Simon & Schuster under the title Uncle Shelby's Zoo: Don't Bump the Glump! and Other Fantasies. It was reissued in 2008 by HarperCollins.

A revision of the poem "The Flying Festoon" was featured in Silverstein's poetry collection Where the Sidewalk Ends, which also featured rewrites of the poems "The Crawfee", "About the Bloath", and "Squishy Squashy Staggitall", titled "Minnow Minnie", "The Bloath", and "The Worst", respectively. The poems "Oops!" and "Glub-Tooth Sline" were later rewritten as "Quick Trip" and "Dinner Guest", which were featured in Silverstein's poetry collection A Light in the Attic.
