= Falling Up (poetry collection) =

1996 illustrated book of poems by Shel Silverstein

- Author: Shel Silverstein
- Illustrator: Shel Silverstein
- Cover artist: Larry Moyer
- Publication date: 1996
- Publication place: United States
- Media type: Hardcover
- Pages: 177
- ISBN: 0-06-024802-5
- OCLC: 34736959

Falling Up is a 1996 poetry collection primarily for children written and illustrated by Shel Silverstein and published by HarperCollins. It is the third poetry collection published by Silverstein, following Where the Sidewalk Ends (1974) and A Light in the Attic (1981), and the final one to be published during his lifetime, as he died just three years after its release. Falling Up was the recipient of the Booklist Editors' Award in 1996.. In 2015, a special edition of the book was published, with 12 new poems.

== Poems ==
- Advice – William Tell tries to shoot an apple off his son's head, but misses and hits the boy's forehead by mistake.
- Allison Beals and Her 25 Eels – A girl has twenty-five pet eels which can do all sorts of things. (The last line of this poem states that one of the eels got a new job on page 59; the eel can be seen on said page in the illustration that accompanies the poem "Writer Waiting.")
- Alphabalance – A boy tries to carry the entire alphabet in his arms.
- Bad Cold – A man has a serious cold and demands the reader to bring him things he can sneeze into. The cold only goes away when he's able to sneeze into a circus tent.
- A Battle in the Sky – The sun and moon battle with each other over whom is superior; neither wins.
- The Bear, the Fire, and the Snow – The bear, the snow, the fire and river talk about how they are all afraid of one another.
- Best Mask? – A child wins first prize at a scary mask contest, even though he isn't actually wearing one.
- Big Eating Contest – A man talks about entering an eating competition and how much money it cost him, feeling exasperated that his prize was only $5.
- Bituminous? – The narrator names some long words and has trouble remembering what they mean.
- Blood-Curdling Story – The narrator describes a gruesome horror story with a twist.
- Body Language – The narrator's body parts all put out conflicting ideas about what they should do; his behind suggests sitting down until they all come to a collective agreement.
- Camp Wonderful – A child describes a summer camp they are going to that is said to be wonderful, somehow thinking they will not like it.
- Carrots – A boy hears that carrots help one's eyesight, but after sticking them in his eyes, he wonders if he is not using them right.
- Castle – The narrator describes a castle that is so thin, going through it takes no time at all.
- A Cat, a Kid, and a Mom – A cat, a child, and the child's mother talk about how foolish they act when they are around each other.
- Cat Jacks – The narrator explains why it's not a good idea to play jacks with a jaguar.
- Cereal – The narrator describes various types of breakfast cereal and laments that there does not exist a cereal to their liking – sloppy and mushy, rather than crisp and crunchy.
- Christmas Dog – A watchdog tries to protect his family from Santa Claus.
- Clean Gene – The poet describes a boy who likes to keep clean all the time and constantly protects himself from germs.
- A Closet Full of Shoes – A girl examines her closet filled with shoes, lamenting that she can't find the shoe that matches the lone one she is wearing.
- Complainin' Jack – A girl's jack-in-the-box pops out by himself and begins to complain about various things. The girl eventually gets tired of it and shuts him back in.
- Cookwitch Sandwich – A boy asks Katrina the Cook (who is actually a witch) to make him a sandwich; she takes this instruction literally and turns him into one.
- Crazy Dream – A boy has a dream in which he is the teacher of his school and all the faculty members are students; he gives them several outrageous homework assignments and inflicts lots of harsh punishments on them until he wakes up.
- Crystal Ball – A fortune teller looks into her crystal ball and tells her customer what she has eaten for lunch; she soon confesses that she isn't really looking at the ball, but the myriad of stains on the customer's dress.
- Danny O'Dare – A girl meets a dancing bear known as Danny O'Dare.
- The Deadly Eye – The narrator warns the readers about an eye that can kill someone just by looking at them.
- Dentist Dan – A boy talks about his dentist, who cleans his teeth with maple syrup and fills his cavities with chocolate. He seems unaware that because of the dentist's unorthodox practices, he has lost most of his teeth.
- Description – A group of people argue over what they think God looks like. The narrator claims to have an autographed photo of God, but does not show them.
- Diving Board – A boy stands on the diving board of a pool, but does not actually dive.
- Don the Dragon's Birthday – Some children bring a dragon a cake for his birthday and he lights the candles on top with his fiery breath.
- Eggs Rated – A man enjoys a plate of scrambled eggs and makes several egg-related puns, until he sees the bill and tries to escape.
- Falling Up – A boy trips on his shoelaces and falls upward instead of down.
- Feeding Time – A zookeeper asks an alligator where fellow zookeeper Mr. Fred is, as he was supposed to help feed him (the illustration shows us that the alligator has actually eaten Mr. Fred).
- The Folks Inside – The narrator explains that elderly people sleep inside young people's bodies, until the person grows up and they emerge.
- Foot Repair – When a boy wears out his feet from too much walking, he decides to visit a cobbler who offers "new soles and heels," but is stunned to find that the total cost would have been roughly the same price for brand-new whole feet.
- Forgetful Paul Revere – Paul Revere desperately tries to remember the exact order of his commands as he sets out for his famous midnight ride.
- The Former Foreman's Story – The foreman of a demolition crew recounts the time they were supposed to demolish a house belonging to a family who had moved out, but destroyed the one next to it by mistake (which he thinks is the reason he was fired).
- Furniture Bash – Several pieces of furniture have a fight and destroy each other.
- Gardener – A boy who was told to water the plants is scolded for urinating on them.
- Glub-Glub – A boy jumps into a puddle, which turns out to be a very small (and very deep) lake.
- The Gnome, the Gnat, and the Gnu – A story of a gnome trying to swat a gnat biting his gnu's nose.
- Golden Goose – In reference to Aesop's fable The Goose that Laid the Golden Eggs, the narrator cooks a golden goose for dinner, finding the task of cooking her golden eggs to be impractical.
- Hand Holding – Someone in a group of people suggests holding hands, but one little boy has no hand to hold.
- Hard to Please – The narrator describes several people who annoy him.
- Haunted – The narrator dares the readers to go inside a creepy haunted house at night, describing all the horrors that can be found inside. He eventually realizes that the dare is silly, and invites the readers to go for ice cream instead.
- Headless Town – A man tries to sell hats in a town where no one has a head.
- Headphone Harold – A boy named Harold is always listening to music on his headphones rather than paying attention to the world around him. This habit causes him a problem when he walks on a set of railway tracks and cannot hear the oncoming train.
- Help! – A unicorn has his horn stuck in a tree, but when offered help, he asks a lot of ridiculous questions.
- Hi-Monster – The narrator points out that an enormous monster is coming through the mist (the readers see its large, scaly tail stretching across the entire page). He guesses that the monster is huge based on how long its tail is, but it is shown to be quite small and not very threatening in appearance on the next page.
- Human Balloon – The narrator describes a man who swells to enormous sizes by guzzling several types of cola and offers rides to people who sit in a basket tied to his stomach.
- Hungry Kid Island – A boy rows out to Hungry Kid Island, which he imagines is full of hungry children who will gladly have lunch with him (he is unaware that the island itself is a giant hungry child).
- Hypnotized – An amateur hypnotist brainwashes someone into doing all of his housework.
- Ice Cream Stop – When a circus train stops at an ice cream stand, all of the animals request different flavors. The vendor refuses to provide them any treats until he is paid, so the menagerie attacks the stand and eats all of the ice cream (including the vendor).
- Imagining – A girl thinks that she has a mouse in her hair; the narrator reassures her that this is not the case, but forgets to mention that there is actually an elephant there instead of a mouse.
- In the Land of... – The narrator describes several made-up countries.
- James – The narrator introduces an anthropomorphic hamburger named James, then goes on to describe all the different names hamburgers have.
- Kanga Ruby – The poet describes a kangaroo who becomes a queen.
- Keepin' Count – Biologist Professor Bacar keeps flies in a jar and challenges other people to count them. A boy accepts this challenge and does considerably well, until a female fly has a baby and he has to start over.
- Keep-Out House – A boy builds a private house with no doors or windows and wonders how he is going to get in.
- Little Hoarse – A boy complains about his sore throat, saying he's "a little hoarse." Other children mishear this and ride on his back as if he were a horse.
- Little Pig's Treat – A piglet riding on his father's back asks to go into a candy store.
- Long-Leg Lou and Short-Leg Sue – The enormously tall Long-Leg Lou and very tiny Short-Leg Sue are good friends who love to walk and talk together. Eventually, Lou gets tired of Sue not being able to keep up with him and abandons her. He ends up lonely, while Sue befriends Slow-Foot Pete.
- Long Scarf – A man wears an extremely long scarf at all times; when asked to remove it, he explains that his head was chopped off and the scarf keeps it in place.
- Lyin' Larry – The narrator describes a young boy who is never truthful.
- Mari-Lou's Ride – A girl swings so high that the ropes break and she is catapulted across town, eventually landing in her mother's lap.
- Medusa – Medusa tries to style her hair, but the snakes in her hair all disagree on what she should do with them.
- Mirror, Mirror – The Evil Queen from the story of Snow White demands that her Magic Mirror tell her "who's the fairest of them all." The exasperated mirror tells her that it is still Snow White, but when the Queen wonders aloud what would happen if she let him fall on the ground, he quickly changes his answer.
- Mister Moody – A man is shown frowning; the narrator tells the readers to turn the picture upside down, but once they do this, he mocks them for expecting to see the man smiling.
- Molly's Folly – A girl named Molly goes to Bali and buys a skateboard, but falls on her pet collie, who bites her in anger.
- The Monkey – A monkey eats some green bananas on his way to the store and becomes ill (this is told using the numbers 1-11).
- Morgan's Curse – A boy finds a treasure chest belonging to the pirate Morgan, but after seeing an inscription on it warning that whoever takes the treasure will be cursed, he wonders if he should take the treasure or leave it there.
- Mummy – A boy wraps himself in toilet paper and pretends to be a mummy as a joke, but nobody finds it amusing.
- Music Lesson – A girl taking piano lessons complains about having to carry her piano up seven flights of stairs to her music teacher.
- My Nose Garden – A man complains about his garden of noses that always catch colds and offers some to the readers.
- My Robot – A girl builds a robot, but every time she orders it to do something, the robot simply rebuffs her.
- My Sneaky Cousin – A girl sneaks into a washing machine, hoping to get a free bath, but she does not enjoy the results.
- The Nap Taker – A child is put on trial for literally taking someone's nap and is sentenced to eternal slumber.
- Needles and Pins – A group of people build a ship and set off for new adventures.
- New World – A girl looks through her legs and sees the world upside-down.
- No – A sign is posted that tells people what they are not allowed to do. A beaver is shown chewing on the sign, who reasons that there is no rule prohibiting beavers.
- No Grown-Ups – A group of children create a secret club where no adults are allowed. They soon change this rule when they go out for pizza and have to pay the bill.
- No Thank You – When offered a kitten, a man rejects it as he already has too many cats.
- Noise Day – The narrator describes a holiday where children can make as much noise as they want.
- Nope – After a boy looks at a piece of cantaloupe under a microscope, he decides to never eat cantaloupe again.
- Obedient – A boy gets in trouble at school and his teacher tells him to stand in the corner. However, she forgets to tell him to go home, and he stands there all through the summer. Come September, the school is shut down, and the boy remains there for forty years.
- Ooh! – A child goes to a petting zoo, but when he pets a baby tiger, his fingers are bitten off.
- One Out of Sixteen – The narrator talks about all the subjects in school that he struggles with.
- People Zoo – A boy gets captured and locked up in a zoo where animals come to look at him.
- Pinocchio – A retelling of the story of Pinocchio.
- Plugging In – A family plugs in all their electronic devices, causing a power outage.
- Poison-Tester – Self-proclaimed "poison-tester" Tru bravely volunteers to test her friend's food to make sure that it is not dangerous.
- Porky – The narrator assigns three people to groom a porcupine, but would rather not help them.
- Quality Time – A father takes his daughter golfing and uses her as a tee.
- Reachin' Richard – A boy named Richard has a habit of reaching across the table instead of asking politely for the food that he wants.
- Red Flowers for You – The narrator offers the readers a bouquet of flowers, joking that they might be poisonous.
- Remote-a-Dad – The narrator describes a remote control that can supposedly control one's father.
- Rotten Convention – The narrator describes a convention for various gruesome characters.
- Runners – A group of track runners attribute their success to their practice field and coach (the field is booby-trapped and the coach is a lion).
- Sack Race – A child signs up for a sack race, but wears his sack the wrong way.
- Safe? – A girl wonders if it's safe to cross the street, not knowing that an actual safe is about to drop on her head.
- Scale – An overweight man laments that his enormous stomach keeps him from seeing the scale.
- Screamin' Millie – A girl named Millie screams so loudly that her facial features fly off her head, which launches off of her neck.
- Settin' Around – A boy sits around a campfire with three monsters, but they are all scared off when he tells them frightening stories.
- Shanna in the Sauna – One person tries to invite another into a sauna filled with animals.
- Sharing – A child is happy to share other people's belongings, but he has a hard time sharing his own.
- Shoe Talk – A boy talks with his shoe.
- Short Kid – A boy talks about how people told him he'd "grow another foot" when he got older. But instead of getting taller, the boy actually has another foot growing out of his head.
- Show Fish – A boy catches a fish and wants to bring it in for show-and-tell, but forgets to; he remembers to bring it in two weeks later, although the fish is now rotten.
- Sidewalking – A child laughs at the superstition of breaking your mother's back when you step on a crack in the pavement, but finds out that this is actually true.
- Smile Makers – A grumpy giant gets tired of frowning, so he gets two people to hold up his mouth so he can smile.
- Snowball – The narrator recounts the time that he made a snowball and kept it as a pet, but it melted overnight.
- Somethin' New – The narrator describes his various attempts at inventing something new.
- Sorry I Spilled It – The narrator apologizes to someone for spilling their breakfast in their bed.
- Spoiled Brat A spoiled girl does many terrible things. She eventually falls into a cooking pot and gets cooked up in a stew, but no one wants to try it "because (the girl) was so spoiled."
- Stone Airplane – A young aviator "builds an airplane out of stone," but quickly realizes that he won't be going anywhere with it.
- Stork Story – An extension of the classic story of the stork in which the stork takes elderly people and turns them back into babies.
- Strange Restaurant – The narrator visits a restaurant and tries to order various meat dishes, but as the place is staffed with various kinds of animals, finding something inoffensive proves difficult. He eventually decides on a salad, but even this is not appropriate, as the owner of the restaurant is a head of cabbage.
- Stupid Pencil Maker – The narrator complains that his pencil has been built wrong, saying that the eraser is where the point should be (it does not occur to him that he is actually holding it wrong).
- Sun Hat – A girl owns a sun hat that has a brim so wide, not only does it give her shade, but it gives other creatures shade as well.
- Sybil the Magician's Last Show – Sybil is a young magician who always she neglects to feed her pet rabbit. Eventually, the rabbit takes revenge by sucking Sybil into her hat and eating her, much to the delight of her audience, who thinks she has disappeared.
- Tattooin' Ruth – A man gets a suit tattooed onto him, as he does not enjoy wearing clothes.
- Tell Me – The narrator asks the readers to tell him that he is a good person, but to be honest about it.
- They Say I Have... – A boy says he has "his father's nose, his grandfather's eyes, and mother's hair," and wonders if his behind is the only thing that is actually his.
- Tongue Sticker-Outer – The story of a young boy living in Zanzibar who stuck his tongue out and burned it when it touched a star in the sky.
- The Toy Eater – A child is warned that the "Terrible Toy-Eating Tookle" will come and devour his toys if he does not put them away.
- Three O'clock – A man accepts a job as a bell ringer, but he actually becomes the bell's clapper.
- Three Stings – Three men get stung by bees.
- Turkey? – A boy describes how he ate a drumstick at a picnic dance and how furious everyone was with him (it is shown in the accompanying illustration that the drumstick he ate was a real one, not a turkey).
- Unfair – A girl complains that the apartment she's staying in won't accept pets, even though the giant monster she has as a pet is completely harmless and knows a lot of tricks.
- Use for a Moose – A girl describes how good a moose's antlers are for hanging clothes to dry, but the moose keeps running off with them.
- The Voice – The narrator describes what a conscience is.
- Warmhearted – An animal rights activist is so devoted to not harming animals that the fox fur that she wears is still alive.
- Wastebasket Brother – The narrator expresses his chagrin that somebody put their baby brother in the wastebasket.
- Weavers – The poet knits a sweater, but a spider brags about how much better it is at weaving.
- Web-Foot Woe – A goose chastises people for confusing her with a duck, even though they're actually warning her about an arrow being shot at his head.
- Weird-Bird – An atypical bird flies north for the winter instead of south, and admits that he likes being the only bird in town sometimes.
- We're Out of Paint, So... – A painter runs out of paint, so he decides to make a painting using juices from various foods.
- When I Was Your Age – A man brags to his nine-year-old nephew about how he could do a lot of things better than him at his age, but he soon reveals that he was actually ten at the time.
- Why Is It? – The narrator talks about a person whose clothes do not feel right, although this is because the person has not put them on properly.
- Woulda-Coulda-Shoulda – Some "woulda-coulda-shouldas" lie in the sun thinking about the things they might have accomplished, only to run away from "one little 'did.'"
- Writer Waiting – A boy who has bought a new computer is trying to write a book, but suffers from writer's block.
- Yuck – A boy gets a sticky substance stuck to his shoe and tries to remove it, only to get all his pets and neighbors stuck too.
