= Lafcadio (disambiguation) =

- Lafcadio Hearn (1850–1904), author best known for his books about Japan
- Lafcadio, a character in the André Gide novel Les caves du Vatican (1914)
- Lafcadio: The Lion Who Shot Back (1963), a children's book written and illustrated by Shel Silverstein
- Lafcadio (2004), an indie rock album by the band As Tall as Lions
- 8114 Lafcadio, a main-belt asteroid named after Lafcadio Hearn
