= The Griffin Family History =

- Family Guy episode
- Episode no.: Season 4 Episode 27
- Directed by: Zac Moncrief
- Written by: John Viener
- Production code: 4ACX30
- Original air date: May 14, 2006

Guest appearances
- Lori Alan as Diane Simmons; Judith Light as herself; Chris Sheridan as various characters; Joey Slotnick as various characters; Danny Smith as various characters; Phil LaMarr as various characters; Khary Payton as various characters

Episode chronology
← Previous "Petergeist"	Next → "Stewie B. Goode"
- Family Guy season 4

"The Griffin Family History" (also known as "Untitled Griffin Family History") is the 27th episode of the fourth season of the animated comedy series Family Guy and the 77th episode overall. It originally aired on Fox in the United States on May 14, 2006. The episode begins after robbers break into the Griffin family home, prompting the family to flee to safety in their panic room. Trapped with no way out, Peter decides to pass the time by telling his family the story of the Griffin family history, narrating a chain of events that describes their equally exotic and dysfunctional ancestry.

The episode was written by John Viener and directed by Zac Moncrief. The episode featured guest performances by Lori Alan as Diane Simmons, and featured Chris Sheridan, Joey Slotnick, Danny Smith, Phil LaMarr and Khary Payton as various characters. The episode received generally mixed reviews from television critics, who dismissed it as clichéd. According to Nielsen rating, it was viewed in 8.03 million homes in its original airing. The episode writer, John Viener, was nominated for an Annie Award for Writing in an Animated Television Production.

== Plot ==
While attempting to make Peter brush his teeth, Lois hears a noise from downstairs and discovers burglars have entered the house. The rest of the family awakens and flee to Peter's self-built panic room in the attic and begin to monitor what the robbers are doing through hidden cameras. Due to the room not having a telephone or an inside door handle, they cannot escape, and Peter begins to tell stories about the history of the Griffin family.

The stories begin with the Big Bang, and then moves to the Paleolithic Age, where it is revealed that Peter's ancestor invented the wheel. The second story sees another Moses as a member of the Griffin family during the Bronze Age leading the Israelites to freedom and presenting the Ten Commandments. The family soon discovers that Meg can fit through the vent, so they force Meg through the vent and into the kitchen. Peter uses a loud speaker to contact Meg from the panic room, therefore alerting the burglars to the fact that somebody is in the kitchen. In order to take the family's mind off Meg being captured, Peter tells the story of Nate Griffin. Nate lived in the small African village of Quahogsuana, but was captured by a white version of Cleveland Brown from South Carolina and taken to America aboard a slave ship. He, along with Quagdingo and Joe Mama, prank the ship captain. While sleeping, they push his bed into the ocean. Nate is caught after briefly escaping and forced to work on a plantation. He falls in love with the owner's daughter, Lois's relatives, Lois Laura Bush Lynne Cheney Pewterschmidt, and together, they bring up a secret family. After being discovered by his lover's father, the couple and their children escape with the help of Al Cowlings, where Nate sets up the Department of Motor Vehicles to "get back at the white man".

After finishing the story, Peter carelessly aims a flare gun through an air vent, causing the sprinklers to come on. Meanwhile, Meg is trying to persuade the burglars to rape her but they are not interested. The rest of the family, still trapped in the panic room, are preparing to potentially drown from the sprinklers filling the room up with water. Peter tells the story of his ancestor, Willie "Black-Eye" Griffin, who was a silent film star in the Roaring Twenties, but whose career later faltered due to his voice (much like Bobcat Goldthwait's) not being cut out for talking pictures. Peter then tells his family about his great uncle, Peter Hitler, who was able to provide Adolf Hitler with success at his Munich speech, although annoying Adolf greatly. As the water from the sprinklers almost reaches its peak, Peter admits to the family that he did not care for The Godfather and a heated debate ensues, ending with Peter declaring his love for The Money Pit. At the last minute Joe rescues them, draining the water out of the room, thus saving their lives. Joe informs the family he has arrested the burglars, but they are pressing harassment charges against Meg. Joe warns that they will need a lawyer to combat the charges, but the family ignores him, and Joe finally gives up and takes Meg away while the family mistakes her being carried for being taken to a dance.

== Production ==
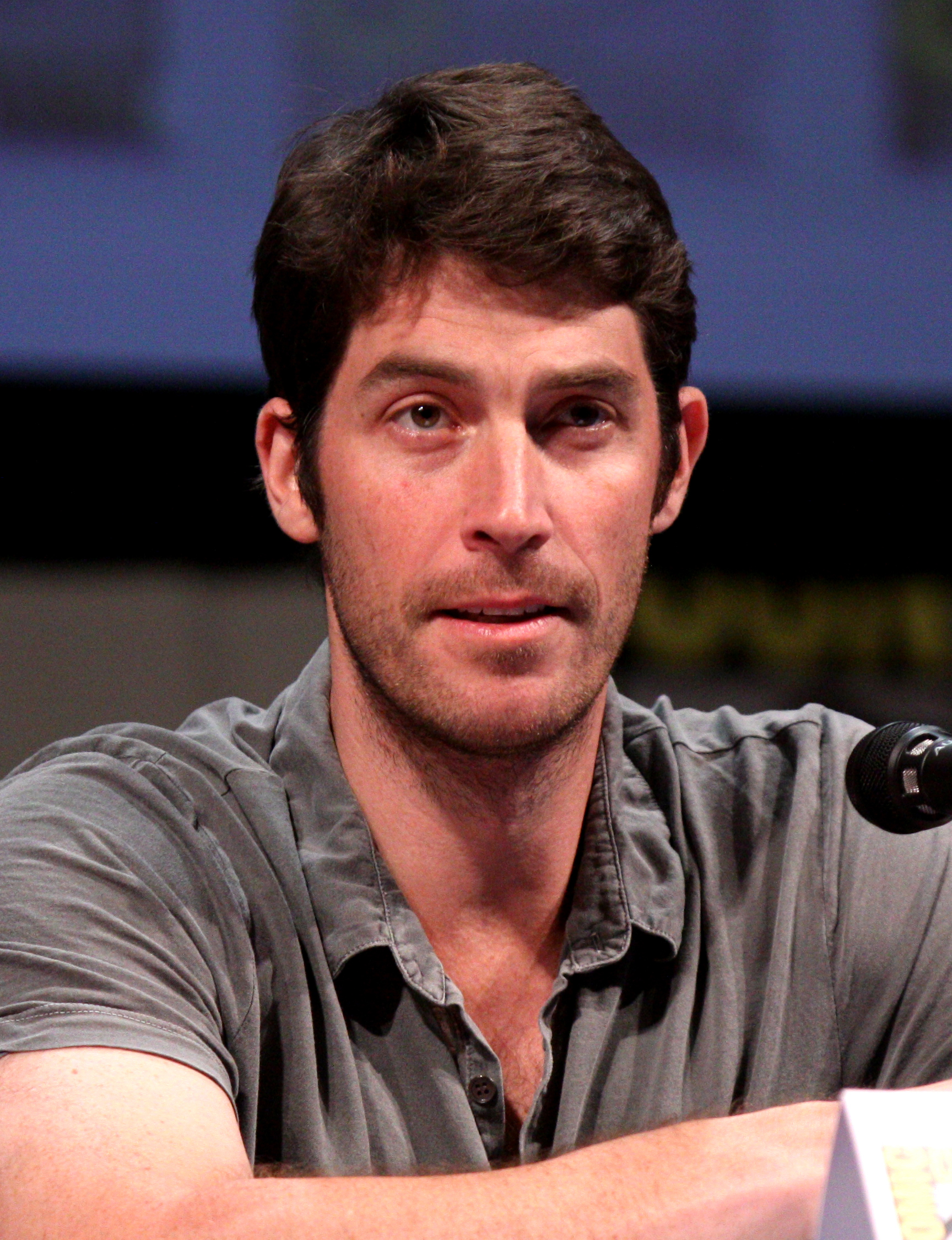
John Viener wrote the episode.

"The Griffin Family History" was written by John Viener and was directed by Zac Moncrief. It guest starred Lori Alan as Diane Simmons and featured Chris Sheridan, Joey Slotnick, Danny Smith and Phil LaMarr as various characters. During the episode's depiction of how the universe was created, God exclaims "ah, you smell that?" after holding a lighter to his butt when performing flatus; this segment of audio was not broadcast on the Fox version of the episode. An additional scene not shown during the televised version was when the Griffins are depicted as dinosaurs. Originally, a Michael Jackson-related scene was to be included in the episode, but it was rescheduled for a later episode due to limited time on this episode. In the original draft of the episode, Brian's speech informing Peter of the dangers in the woods during the Nate Griffin story was intended to be longer, including Brian talking about automobile ratings, though it was shortened for unknown reasons. MacFarlane praises the animation sequence showing a horse running around Lois' bedroom, describing it as "a piece of brilliance".

Show producers removed a sketch which would include a rape joke upon Carter's discovery of his daughter, Lois, with her secret family on the southern plantation. Unlike past requests to cut and/or alter jokes, this was not one imposed by the broadcast standards and practices; this was done on the writers' own accord. The sequence showing Peter's silent film star ancestor being stabbed in a card fight was omitted from television broadcasting to save time. Near the end of the episode, the Griffins are shown arguing over the quality of The Godfather, with Peter criticising the critically acclaimed film by saying, "It insists upon itself". According to MacFarlane, the quote was taken from his college film history professor, who dismissed the film The Sound of Music using the same quote. The scene is drawn from an actual argument that has taken place in the Family Guy writing room over its quality. MacFarlane prefers The 'Burbs and The Money Pit, both of which received mixed reviews from critics. Adolf Hitler talking to his wife about his annoyance at Peter Hitler was also removed from television broadcasting for timing purposes.

== Cultural references ==
The basic premise of the episode, as well as the design of Peter's panic room, are based on the film Panic Room. When Peter's Paleolithic ancestor is attempting to market the wheel, Brian tells him "You so money, you don't even know it", a reference to the film Swingers. His ancestor says "Let's party like it's 9" in reference to the Prince song "1999". The story of Nate Griffin, an ancestor of Peter, makes references to the first installment of Roots, as well as the LAPD's low-speed pursuit of O. J. Simpson following his wife's murder and the song "Hot for Teacher". Nate Griffin is a member of the tribe of Tootie-and-Blair, a reference to the sitcom The Facts of Life. The scene in which the slave ship captain is thrown overboard uses the song "Are You Ready for the Summer?" from the 1979 film Meatballs. The story about Peter's ancestor who was a silent film star is a spoof of Singin' in the Rain, as the girl in Singin' in the Rain did not have a good voice for the talking pictures. His speaking voice, deemed unacceptable for talkies, was a spoof of Bobcat Goldthwait.

== Reception ==
"Untitled Griffin Family History" finished 49th in the weekly ratings for the week of May 8–14, 2006, with a Nielsen rating of 8.03. The episode received generally mixed reviews from critics. In his review of the episode, Bob Sassone of TV Squad commented "All in all, a so-so episode. It started rather strong but got weaker as it went along". In his review of the Family Guy: Volume Four DVD, Michael Drucker of IGN stated "Untitled Griffin Family History" to be "as cliché as the tropes they're mocking". Despite this, John Viener, the writer of the episode was nominated for an Annie Award for Writing in an Animated Television Production.
