= Barely Legal (Family Guy) =

- Family Guy episode
- Episode no.: Season 5 Episode 8
- Directed by: Zac Moncrief
- Written by: Kirker Butler
- Production code: 5ACX03
- Original air date: December 17, 2006

Guest appearances
- Drew Barrymore as Jillian; Barclay DeVeau as Patty; Phil LaMarr as Ollie Williams; Kerrigan Mahan; Natasha Melnick as Ruth; Garrett Morris as himself (live-action); Tamera Mowry as Esther; Lisa Wilhoit as Connie D'Amico and Beth

Episode chronology
← Previous "Chick Cancer"	Next → "Road to Rupert"
- Family Guy season 5

"Barely Legal" is the eighth episode of season five of Family Guy. The episode originally broadcast on Fox on December 17, 2006. The plot sees Meg developing an obsession with Brian after he accompanies her as her date for the Junior Prom, eventually leading to her kidnapping Brian in order to rape him. Meanwhile, Peter and his friends join the Quahog Police Department to assist Joe with his work, but find being a police officer is not always about action.

The episode was written by Kirker Butler and directed by Zac Moncrief. It received mostly positive reviews from critics for its storyline and many cultural references, in addition from receiving criticism from the Parents Television Council. According to Nielsen ratings, it was viewed in 8.48 million homes in its original airing. The episode featured guest performances by Drew Barrymore, Barclay DeVeau, Phil LaMarr, Kerrigan Mahan, Natasha Melnick, Garrett Morris, Tamera Mowry and Lisa Wilhoit. The episode won an Annie Award for "Writing in an Animated Television Production."

== Plot ==
After watching Romancing the Stone on TV, Mayor Adam West deploys the entire Quahog Police Department to Cartagena, Colombia to search for one of the film's characters, Elaine Wilder. Peter, Cleveland and Quagmire join the police department's skeleton crew to assist Joe, who has been left behind due to his disability as parts of Cartagena are not wheelchair-accessible.

Meanwhile, Meg feels suicidal because she does not have a date for her Junior Prom. Even her backup boy, Jimmy, turned her down by shooting his younger brother to attend his funeral. As a last resort, Brian agrees to take her to the prom. As the evening progresses, he becomes increasingly drunk from a whisky flask he brought with him. When Connie D'Amico insults Meg, Brian defends her by telling Connie about her inevitable future, and he and Meg make out. After the dance, Meg begins to think Brian is her boyfriend, despite Brian saying he does not have romantic feelings for her and citing his existing relationship with Jillian. Meg develops an obsession with Brian, even baking him a pie and using her hair, implied to be her pubic ones, as one of the ingredients. Stewie arrives and sits next to Brian and asks if he can have some pie. He then asks for the "Cool Hwhip" (this is the first in a series of occasions where Stewie puts emphasis on the "h" sound in a word starting with "wh"). Brian starts to lose control of the situation and has to admit to Lois that he and Meg kissed. Lois is enraged at the news, and orders him to straighten it out on his own.

Brian goes up to Meg's room and tells her he is not attracted to her. However, Meg refuses to take "no" for an answer. Later that night, she knocks Brian out, puts him in the trunk of his car and drives away. Chris sees this and tells Lois (but was unable to tell her for two days due to being caught up in paperwork), and she, Peter, Cleveland, Joe and Quagmire track them down at the Barrington Hotel, where they see Meg has tied Brian up with packaging tape and is about to rape him. Lois tells Meg that she is not thinking right, although Meg insists that she has never been more sure of anything in her life. Lois struggles to explain and says Meg does not know what she needs, and then Quagmire says in an erotic tone that he knows what she needs, and asks Meg to meet him at his house. This implies that he will try to take advantage of Meg and when she arrives at his house, it seems even more likely when he puts on seductive music, dims the lights, strips down to a speedo and sits down beside her. But suddenly, Quagmire uncharacteristically begins to have a serious heart-to-heart talk with Meg, telling her that her entire life is still ahead of her and she should not be in such a hurry to grow up before assuring her that she will find the right person one day. To help Meg, Quagmire gives her his copy of The Missing Piece to help give her a better perception on things, and sends her away feeling much better. It is then revealed that Quagmire was preparing to have a threesome with two women who are waiting in his bedroom with an array of sex toys; one of the women asks a confused Quagmire if he has the hwhip (with emphasis on the "h").

== Production ==
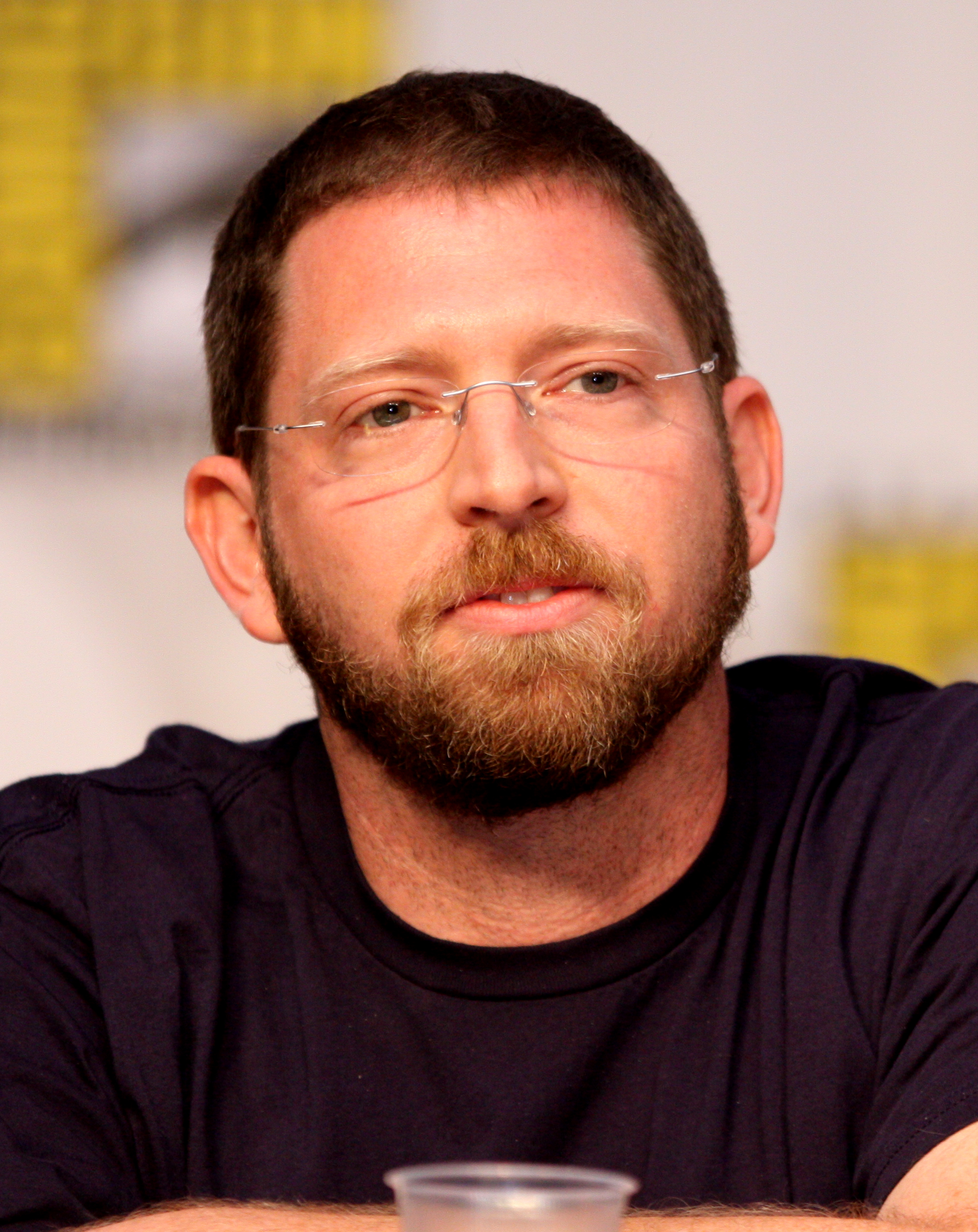
Kirker Butler wrote the episode.

A scene shows Cleveland falling out of the bathtub and subsequently out of his house. This is the second time the show has used this gag (as indicated when Cleveland comments that "I gotta stop taking baths during Peter's shenanigans"), the first one being "Hell Comes to Quahog", where Peter blew up Cleveland's house with a tank. This gag occurred three more times in the seventh season episodes "Tales of a Third Grade Nothing" and "Family Gay", the season eight episodes "Spies Reminiscent of Us", "Brian's Got a Brand New Bag", and the Cleveland Show pilot. It took several attempts to animate it correctly. The gag of Meg's Junior Prom date killing his brother in order to escape from their planned date was included in the first draft for the episode, as made by Kirker Butler.

A scene featuring Peter, Cleveland, Mort and Quagmire drinking coffee in the booth, waiting for one of them to act irrationally due to Joe adding a substance into their drink, was cut from the broadcast for timing purposes. A deleted scene had been made for the episode, which showed one of the characters present in the booth after Joe added a substance into their drink, turning into a lizard-like creature from Jurassic Park, but the gag was never used. When Brian is explaining the situation with Meg to Lois in the uncensored version he says "this morning she made me eat the hair in her pie" Broadcast standards objected to this and it was changed for air to "hair pie". On the DVD commentary MacFarlane remarked he thought the latter sounded more offensive. American actor and comedian Garrett Morris guest-starred on the episode, portraying the headmaster of the "New York School for the Hard-of-Hearing", which was once a regular Weekend Update piece on the 1970s episodes of Saturday Night Live. When Peter and everybody else discover Meg attempting to seduce Brian in the hotel, Peter uses the term "Chinaman"; this was changed for the television broadcast to "oriental guy", as "Chinaman" is deemed to be an offensive word.

In addition to the regular cast, actress Drew Barrymore, voice actor Barclay DeVeau, voice actor Phil LaMarr, voice actor Kerrigan Mahan, actress Natasha Melnick, comedian and actor Garrett Morris, actress Tamera Mowry and actress Lisa Wilhoit guest starred in the episode. Recurring guest voice actors Lori Alan, actress Alex Breckenridge, voice actor John G. Brennan, writer Chris Sheridan, writer Alec Sulkin and writer John Viener made minor appearances. Recurring guest voice actors Patrick Warburton and Adam West made appearances as well.

== Cultural references ==
The movie Mayor West is watching on the television is Romancing the Stone. The music played in the background during the black people's parade is taken almost verbatim from the film adaptation of the 1975 musical The Wiz where, in the final number of the film, they sing "Brand New Day" when it came to the absence of most of the Quahog Police Department. The two songs playing in the background at the junior prom are "Hold On to the Nights" by Richard Marx and "Why" by Annie Lennox. The music used in the background and the academy's logo when Peter, Quagmire and Cleveland are entering the police training grounds is a reference to that used in the Police Academy. The scene where Meg plays Madame Butterfly while turning the lamp on and off and the line "I will not be ignored, Brian" is a reference to the 1987 film Fatal Attraction. The entire scene in the hotel where Meg is discovered attempting to seduce Brian is a reference to The King of Comedy, which MacFarlane notes as one of his favorite movies. When Peter Griffin steals a giraffe from the zoo, he names the giraffe Allison Janney. Garrett Morris reprises his role as Headmaster of the New York School for the Hard of Hearing from the first season of Saturday Night Live.

== Reception ==
In a significant decrease from the previous week, the episode was viewed in 8.48 million homes in its original airing, according to Nielsen ratings. The episode also acquired a 3.0 rating in the 18–49 demographic, slightly being edged out by The Simpsons, while still winning over American Dad!.

This episode was written by Kirker Butler, who was nominated at the 34th Annie Awards under the category of "Writing in an Animated Television Production", and Mila Kunis, who voices Meg, was also nominated for her work on this episode under the category of "Voice Acting in an Animated Television Production". In his review of the episode, Dan Iverson of IGN wrote: "After a couple more episodes like the one that Family Guy had on Sunday night, we could officially and unequivocally call the show the best animated program to air on the weekend", adding "we are completely willing to raise the once hit-or-miss comedy of Family Guy to the level of most consistently funny comedy on FOX Sunday nights — and that is thanks to great stories and hilarious comedy like that of this week's episode "Barely Legal." In a review of Family Guy, Volume five, Nancy Basile regarded "Airport '07", "Prick Up Your Ears", and "Barely Legal" as "gem episodes". Brett Love of TV Squad commented: "It seemed like more of a cohesive story than we have seen in a while as the whole family was tied in to the same storyline", later adding "I liked the story of Meg's infatuation with Brian", concluding with "overall, I'd call this one a really good episode."

However, the Parents Television Council, a media watchdog group and frequent critic, named "Barely Legal" the "Worst TV Show of the Week" ending the week of December 28, 2006. PTC member and writer Joey Bozell commented, "It's becoming more and more obvious that these writers' missions is to provide the most offensive content they can imagine and in turn proves they don't have an ounce of respect for the families watching at home."
