= The Missing Piece (book) =

1976 children's picture book by Shel Silverstein

- Hardcover book
- Author: Shel Silverstein
- Language: English
- Genre: Children's Literature
- Publication date: 1976
- Publication place: United States
- Followed by: The Missing Piece Meets the Big O

The Missing Piece is a children's picture book by poet Shel Silverstein.

== Plot ==
The story centers on a circular shape-like creature that is missing a wedge-shaped piece of itself. It doesn't like this, and sets out to find its missing piece, singing:

Oh, I'm lookin' for my missin' piece
I'm lookin' for my missin' piece
Hi-dee-ho, here I go
lookin' for my missin' piece

It starts out on a grand adventure searching for the perfect piece to complete itself, while singing and enjoying the scenery. But after the circle finally finds the exact-sized wedge that fits it, it begins to realize that it can no longer do the things it used to enjoy doing, like singing or rolling slowly enough to enjoy the company of a worm or butterfly. It decides that it was happier when searching for the missing piece than actually having it. So it gently puts the piece down, and continues searching happily.

== Popular culture ==
- The 1998 album Komadić koji nedostaje by the Serbian pop punk band Oružjem Protivu Otmičara was named after the book. Silverstein's drawing which appeared on the cover of the book was used on the cover of the album.
- On the television show Family Guy (episode: "Barely Legal"), Glenn Quagmire gives Meg Griffin the book to help her in her path through adolescence.
- In the popular teen fiction book An Abundance of Katherines, this book is mentioned as a gift to child prodigy Colin Singleton from his father. When asked the question, "Do you sometimes feel like a circle with a missing piece?", Colin replies, "Daddy, I am not a circle, I am a boy."
- In the 2017 movie The Upside, the character Philip Lacasse's love interest Lily Foley refers to The Missing Piece to subtly convey to him that she is not interested in pursuing a relationship.

== Sequel ==
A sequel was published in 1981 entitled The Missing Piece Meets the Big O, which is told from a Missing Piece's point of view.
