= Uncle Shelby's ABZ Book =

Book by Shel Silverstein

Uncle Shelby's ABZ Book (ISBN 067121148X) is a satirical alphabet book by Shel Silverstein. First published in 1961, it is sometimes described as "subversive". The cover on some editions of the book read "A primer for adults only" while other editions read "A primer for tender young minds" instead.

== Humor ==
Much of the humor derives from a cynical drive to give the reader misleading, harmful advice. A portion of the book originally appeared in a slightly different form in Playboy magazine. Silverstein urges the reader to keep termites as pets, play hopscotch with real Scotch whisky and give their father a haircut while he sleeps. He tells the reader that "Mommy loves the baby more than she loves you", and he uses the letter "E", first, to discourage the reader from ever wanting to eat eggs, and then, to encourage the reader to throw eggs up to the ceiling:

E is for egg.
See the egg.
The egg is full of slimey gooey white stuff and icky yellow stuff.
Do you like to eat eggs?
E is also for Ernie.
Ernie is the genie who lives in the ceiling.
Ernie loves eggs.
Take a nice fresh egg and throw it as high as you can and yell "Catch, Ernie! Catch the egg!"
And Ernie will reach down and catch the egg.

He also misdefines a gigolo as a woodwind musical instrument similar to the oboe, assumes the reader can eat as many as 116 green apples in a single day and states that quarantine means, "Come in, kids — free ice cream." He also tells kids that there is a real live pony inside the car (in order to encourage them to put sugar in the gas tank) and elves inside the TV set (likewise encouraging them to break the TV open with a hammer and let the "elves" out), repeatedly misspells "hippopotamus" and uses the letter "I" to inform readers that they can drink ink:

I is for ink.
Ink is black and wet.
Ink is fun.
What can you do with ink?
What rhymes with ink?
"DR_ _ _."

Of course this is all offered in a humorous vein; nevertheless, some readers have been offended by the satire. Indeed, Silverstein is one of the American Library Association's most challenged authors. While some view the book's humor as directed towards adults, it was Silverstein's belief that children and elderly people should be treated no differently from anyone else.
