= Zac Moncrief =

American animator

- Born: Zachary Thomas Moncrief; Spring Valley, New York, U.S.
- Other name: Zachary Moncrief
- Occupations: Animation executive producer, writer, director, storyboard artist, song writer
- Years active: 1994–present
- Known for: Phineas and Ferb; Family Guy; Brickleberry; The Fairly OddParents; American Dad!; Be Cool, Scooby-Doo!; What a Cartoon!; Johnny Bravo; Oh Yeah! Cartoons; Dora the Explorer; The Adventures of Kid Danger

Zachary Thomas Moncrief is an American artist, producer, director, and writer in the animation industry. He's currently a co-executive producer on Netflix's pre-school series Ghee Happy. His titles have included supervising producer, writer, supervising director, storyboard artist, designer, and songwriter. In 2009, an episode from Phineas and Ferb, which he directed entitled "The Monster of Phineas-n-Ferbenstein", received a Primetime Emmy Award nomination in the category for Outstanding Special Class Short-format Animated Programs.

== Personal life ==
Moncrief left Montvale, New Jersey in 1989 after graduating from Pascack Hills High School where his father was the vice principal. Upon completion of high school, he decided to attend California Institute of the Arts, a Disney-funded college specializing in animation.

== Career ==
Zac Moncrief's career began as an intern on the animated feature, The Pagemaster, and then moved on as an assistant animator on the film Cats Don't Dance. While there, he sold a pilot to Fred Seibert (then president of MTV Networks and Hanna-Barbera), for the What a Cartoon! series titled Godfrey and Zeek. This transitioned into doing story work for Hanna-Barbera's other series, Johnny Bravo.

Moncrief went on to open his own company, creating animation on several CD-ROMs, as well as a commercial work featuring Warner Bros.' Road Runner, the Carl's Jr. spot featuring Dennis Rodman, as well as animation for a GM-sponsored ride at Walt Disney World. Soon after, Moncrief joined Seibert again on a shorts program at Nickelodeon called Oh Yeah! Cartoons. There, Moncrief created Kitty the Hapless Cat, Baxter and Bananas, and worked on other shorts like The Fairly OddParents and the Emmy winning short Max and His Special Problem. He spent his remaining time at Nickelodeon storyboarding in season one of Dora the Explorer.

Shortly thereafter, he was asked to teach at his alma mater (CalArts) and by Walt Disney Television Animation to storyboard on Teacher's Pet, the series (and its theatrical release), as well as direct-to-videos for Lilo & Stitch, Kim Possible, and Brandy and Mr. Whiskers.

Moncrief then went on as a Director on the Fox animated series Family Guy working on some of Seth MacFarlane's favorite episodes, such as "The Griffin Family History" and "Barely Legal".

He then followed fellow Family Guy director Dan Povenmire back to Disney again to help direct over 50+ episodes of the hit Disney television series Phineas and Ferb.

After his long run at Disney, he spent three years working at Bento Box as the Supervising Director on Comedy Central's hit show Brickleberry, while also helping to develop shows at Nickelodeon.

In December 2013, he joined Warner Bros. Animation to produce and revamp the twelfth series in the Scooby-Doo franchise, titled Be Cool, Scooby-Doo!, which debuted in the fall of 2015.

After producing close to 52 episodes and almost 2 seasons for Warner Bros., he then went back to Nickelodeon as a Supervising Producer in the fall of 2017 to help oversee and launch a cartoon series based on the hit Dan Schneider television show Henry Danger. This new animated series, titled The Adventures of Kid Danger, debuted on January 15, 2018, as a sneak peek, before its official premiere on January 19. The shows' ratings stayed consistently in the top 25, and on its final premiere episodes during the week of June 11–17, 2018, it was the #1 program for K6–11 (it received at 2.91 for boys aged 2–5 and a 3.15 for boys aged 6–11). The show is currently not slated for more episodes.

Moncrief then went on to be the Artistic Lead/Showrunner on the television adaption of the popular Lego augmented reality game app Hidden Side, with the title of Supervising Director. While working with Pure Imagination Studios, Moncrief created 19 different shorts for Lego, and launched off a 44-minute movie as a way to introduce its newest IP. The series premiered on YouTube to record numbers earning it a slot airing on Cartoon Network.

Moncrief is currently working with Sanjay Patel as co-executive producer on Ghee Happy.

=== Highlights ===
- Phineas and Ferb (2D - Kids and Family) • Director, writer and board artist on over 60+ episodes
- LEGO: HIDDEN SIDE (3D - Kids and Family) • Creative lead directing artists and voice talent taking 20 episodes from script through post delivery
- Be Cool, Scooby- Doo! (2D - Kids and Family) • Creative lead in the reimagining of legacy characters producing 52 episodes
- Brickleberry (2D- Adult) • Artistic lead to 1st time animation show creators for the first 2 seasons
- GHEE HAPPY (3D - Pre-School) • Co-Ep involved in story, writing, song writing, and directing

=== Phineas and Ferb ===
In 2007, Moncrief returned to Disney to work as a director and writer for Phineas and Ferb. As of December 2012, he had directed over 50 episodes in the series and been credited on over 90+ different credits.

=== Family Guy ===
In 2005, Moncrief left Disney to become a director on the Fox television series Family Guy for Fox Animation Studios. He directed six episodes over a two-year span. Those six episodes were:

- "Peter's Got Woods", first aired on September 11, 2005
- "Brian Sings and Swings", first aired on January 8, 2006
- "Untitled Griffin Family History", first aired on May 14, 2006
- "Barely Legal", first aired on December 17, 2006
- "It Takes a Village Idiot, and I Married One", first aired on May 13, 2007
- "Peter's Daughter", first aired on November 25, 2007
- "Blind Ambition", first aired on May 15, 2005 (assistant director)

During this period, he also returned to CalArts as a teacher.

== Credits ==
Note: Also credited as Zachary Moncrief.

Below is a detailed list of his credits:

20th Television Animation:

- Family Guy (2005–2007) - Director
- Futurama - Storyboard artist
- American Dad! - Storyboard artist

Turner Feature Animation:

- The Pagemaster (1994) - Coordinator and animation intern
- Cats Don't Dance (1997) - Assistant animator

Hanna-Barbera:

- What a Cartoon!: Godfrey and Zeek short (also misspelled "Zeke") (1996) - Co-creator, co-writer, storyboard artist, and director
- What a Cartoon!: "Jungle Boy" (short from Johnny Bravo) (1996) - Character layout and additional models
- Johnny Bravo (1996–1997) - Development and storyboard artist
- Johnny Bravo: "Bearly Enough Time" (1997) - Storyboard artist
- Johnny Bravo: "Cookie Crisis" (1997) - Storyboard artist
- Johnny Bravo: "Blarney Buddies" (1997) - Storyboard artist

Nickelodeon:

- Dora the Explorer: Season 1 (2000–2001) - Storyboard artist
- The Fairly OddParents: Seasons 2 and 3 - Storyboard revisionist
- My Life as a Teenage Robot - Storyboard Revisions and additional model designer
- Woodstump - Supervising director, storyboard artist, co-writer
- The Adventures of Kid Danger (2017–2018) - Director and supervising producer
- Nickelodeon's Oh Yeah! Cartoons:
  - Kitty the Hapless Cat - Creator, director, designer, storyboard artist, writer
  - Baxter and Bananas - Creator, director, designer, storyboard artist, writer
  - The Fairly OddParents: Story & Storyboard artist for two episodes
  - Mina and the Count: "Playing a Hunch" (1999) - Storyboard artist
  - Max and His Special Problem - Animator
  - Max and the Pigeon Incident - Storyboard clean-up and character model assistance
  - Tales from the Goose Lady - Storyboard clean-up and character model assistance

Disney Television Animation:

- Teacher's Pet - Storyboard artist
- Kim Possible: Season 1 - Storyboard revisionist
- Lilo & Stitch: The Series - additional storyboard artist and Storyboard revisionist
- Kim Possible: Season 2 - Storyboard artist
- Lilo & Stitch 2: Stitch Has a Glitch - Storyboard artist
- Brandy & Mr. Whiskers - storyboard artist
- Phineas and Ferb - Director, storyboard supervisor, writer, storyboard artist

Netflix:

- Paradise P.D. - supervising director
- Disenchantment - storyboard artist
- Ghee Happy - co-executive producer

Other Credits:

- Comedy Central:
  - Brickleberry - director and supervising director
- Warner Bros. Animation:
  - Be Cool, Scooby-Doo! (2015–2018) - producer
