= The Monster of Phineas-n-Ferbenstein =

- Phineas and Ferb episode
- Episode no.: Season 1 Episode 22a
- Directed by: Zac Moncrief
- Written by: Jon Colton Barry (story, storyboards); Martin Olson (story); Mike Diederich (storyboards)
- Production code: 122a
- Original air date: October 17, 2008

Guest appearance
- Malcolm McDowell as Reginald Fletcher

Episode chronology
| ← Previous "Bowl-R-Ama Drama" | Next → "Oil on Candace" |
- Phineas and Ferb (season 1)

"The Monster of Phineas-n-Ferbenstein" is the first half of the 22nd episode, as well as the 40th broadcast episode of the animated television series Phineas and Ferb. The episode revolves around Phineas Flynn and his step-brother, Ferb Fletcher, being told the story of how their Victorian ancestor helped a scientist create a monster. Meanwhile, Perry the Platypus is told a similar yet connected story concerning Dr. Heinz Doofenshmirtz's Victorian ancestor, who transformed himself into a monster.

Written by Martin Olson and Jon Colton Barry, "The Monster of Phineas-n-Ferbenstein" was directed by Zac Moncrief. Malcolm McDowell guest stars as Ferb's grandfather Reginald Fletcher, who had appeared earlier in the season in "A Hard Day's Knight" and "The Flying Fishmonger" along with Ferb's grandmother Winifred Fletcher (voiced by Jane Carr). It originally aired on Disney Channel on October 17, 2008. The episode received generally positive reviews and was nominated for the Emmy Award for "Outstanding Special Class – Short-format Animated Programs" in 2008, but the award was never given out.

== Plot ==
External videos
- The Monster of Phineas-n-Ferbenstein S1 E22 Full Episode Phineas and Ferb @disneyxd — Official upload of the episode onto YouTube

In a cold opening with the theme music, Phineas and Ferb warn the audience that the program will be frightening, disturbing, and horrifying. Ferb chokes up a hairball, and Phineas says "You've been warned." When the episode officially starts, Phineas is feeling disappointed by the pouring rain and power outage, canceling his plan to stand in the middle of a field with a metal rod, until his step-grandfather Reginald starts to tell the stepbrothers the story of their ancestor, Ferbgor, a hunchback henchman of the Victorian era who assists his master Dr. Phineastein, a mad scientist, in gathering platypus body parts to create a platypus monster and enter him in a "monster ball".

Meanwhile, Perry heads over to Doofenshmirtz Evil Inc. to find out what Doofenshmirtz's current plans are, but he accidentally locks himself and Doofenshmirtz in his apartment (due to the storm that is causing Doofenshmirtz's security system to go haywire), much to Doofenshmirtz's anger. Realizing his mistake, Perry has no choice but to make himself comfy in Doofenshmirtz's place until the power is back on. As the two nemeses sit while drinking some hot cocoa, Doofenshmirtz tells Perry the story of his Victorian ancestor, Dr. Jekyll Doofenshmirtz, who attempted to impress an angry mob by transforming himself into a beast using a formula-making machine: the Concoction-inator, only to fail and become a fairy princess instead.

In Reginald's tale, Phineastein and Ferbgor construct and bring their monster to life, which frightens, then angers their castle governess, Constance, and provokes her to rally the mob against them (referencing Candace's attempts to bust her brothers). The two are unaffected by her intentions and train their beast, rather poorly, so he will be ready to participate at the monster ball.

In the meantime, Jekyll rectifies the problem with his formula-making machine and transforms himself into a hulking monster. He then goes to the village to torment the citizens and cause mayhem (though it seems that he's only doing childish pranks rather that just going out on a real rampage). During his rampage, he upsets the platypus monster and is chased all over the village by him. Phineastein and Ferbgor go looking for their creation and find him thanks to an unnamed Isabella Lookalike. The platypus monster has ended up at the monsters' ball. Before Dr. Phineastein and Ferbgor enter the ball, the monster viciously batters Jekyll and eats him. In the present, the power returns and Doofenshmirtz rushes Perry off to the door, telling him to come back tomorrow for his next evil scheme (however, he was going to have a scheme, but didn't have time due to the chiropractor). Doofenshmirtz then wonders what was the conclusion to the story. In Reginald's story, Phineastein and Ferbgor find the monster and the winner of the ball is announced: it is Constance, who has accidentally drunk Jekyll's formula and transformed into a beast, herself, and gets chased by the mob, presumed to be captured or killed. With the story concluded, Reginald reveals that he has completely forgotten everything he has just related because of his senility. Ferb closes the episode saying that "platypus monsters are the only monsters to lay eggs."

== Voice cast ==
- Vincent Martella as Phineas Flynn, Dr. Phineastein
- Thomas Sangster as Ferb Fletcher
- Ashley Tisdale as Candace Flynn, Constance
- Dee Bradley Baker as Perry the Platypus, Platypus Monster, Villager in Underpants, Additional Voices
- Dan Povenmire as Dr. Doofenshmirtz, Jekyll Doofenshmirtz
- Jeff "Swampy" Marsh as Major Monogram, Additional Voices
- Alyson Stoner as Isabella Lookalike Village Girl
- Mitchel Musso as Jerimiah
- Malcolm McDowell as Reginald Fletcher, Angry Mobster, Additional Voices
- Greg Ellis as Jameson, Additional Voices
- Olivia Olson as Backup Singers (uncredited)
- Candi Milo and Jeff Bennett as Additional Voices

== Production ==
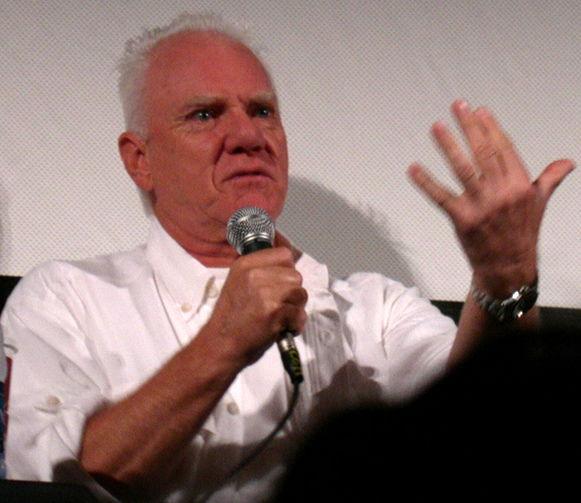
Malcolm McDowell continued his portrayal of Grandpa Reginald in "The Monster of Phineas-n-Ferbenstein".

"The Monster of Phineas-n-Ferbenstein" was conceived and storied by Jon Colton Barry and Martin Olson; Barry adapted it into storyboards along with Mike Diederleh. Zac Moncrief, who does the majority of directing for the series along with the show's co-creator, Dan Povenmire, directed it. The second half of the show was an episode entitled "Oil on Candace," which followed Phineas and Ferb helping their friend Django.

Malcolm McDowell and Jane Carr guest starred in the episode as Grandpa and Grandma Fletcher. Carr and McDowell had each been recurring guest stars in their respective roles; they previously appeared as the characters in "A Hard Days Knight" and "The Flying Fishmonger" and would go on to voice them in season two's "Elementary, My Dear Stacy."

"The Monster of Phineas-n-Ferbenstein" originally broadcast on Disney Channel on October 17, 2008, with a TV-G rating. The episode continued a Halloween theme started by the October 3 airing of "One Good Scare Ought to Do It."

== Reception ==
Julie Bonner of Ultimate Disney described Phineastein and Ferbgor as "interesting relatives" and that she "wouldn't expect anything less from [Phineas and Ferb]." In 2009, it was announced that "The Monster of Phineas-n-Ferbenstein" was nominated for an Emmy award in the category "Outstanding Special Class – Short-format Animated Programs." Its sole competitor was the SpongeBob SquarePants episode "Dear Vikings". Dan Povenmire and Jeff "Swampy" Marsh, co-creators of the show and producers of the episode, were reportedly "thrilled" about the nomination and felt like they were "back in grade school." Povenmire said he was very happy with the inclusion of the category: "It used to be that the Emmys would always go to shows like The Simpsons and Family Guy and just one slot saved for shows made for kids." Both announced that they were very excited about competing against SpongeBob SquarePants for the award, though Povenmire did jokingly remark, "You're going down, Stephen!" to SpongeBob SquarePants creator, Stephen Hillenburg. Povenmire also thought the nomination meant his show was attracting a widening audience. However, the Academy of Television Arts & Sciences announced that they would not present the award to either of the nominees, to shock of director Moncrief.
