= Shel Silverstein =

American poet, cartoonist, writer, and songwriter (1930–1999)

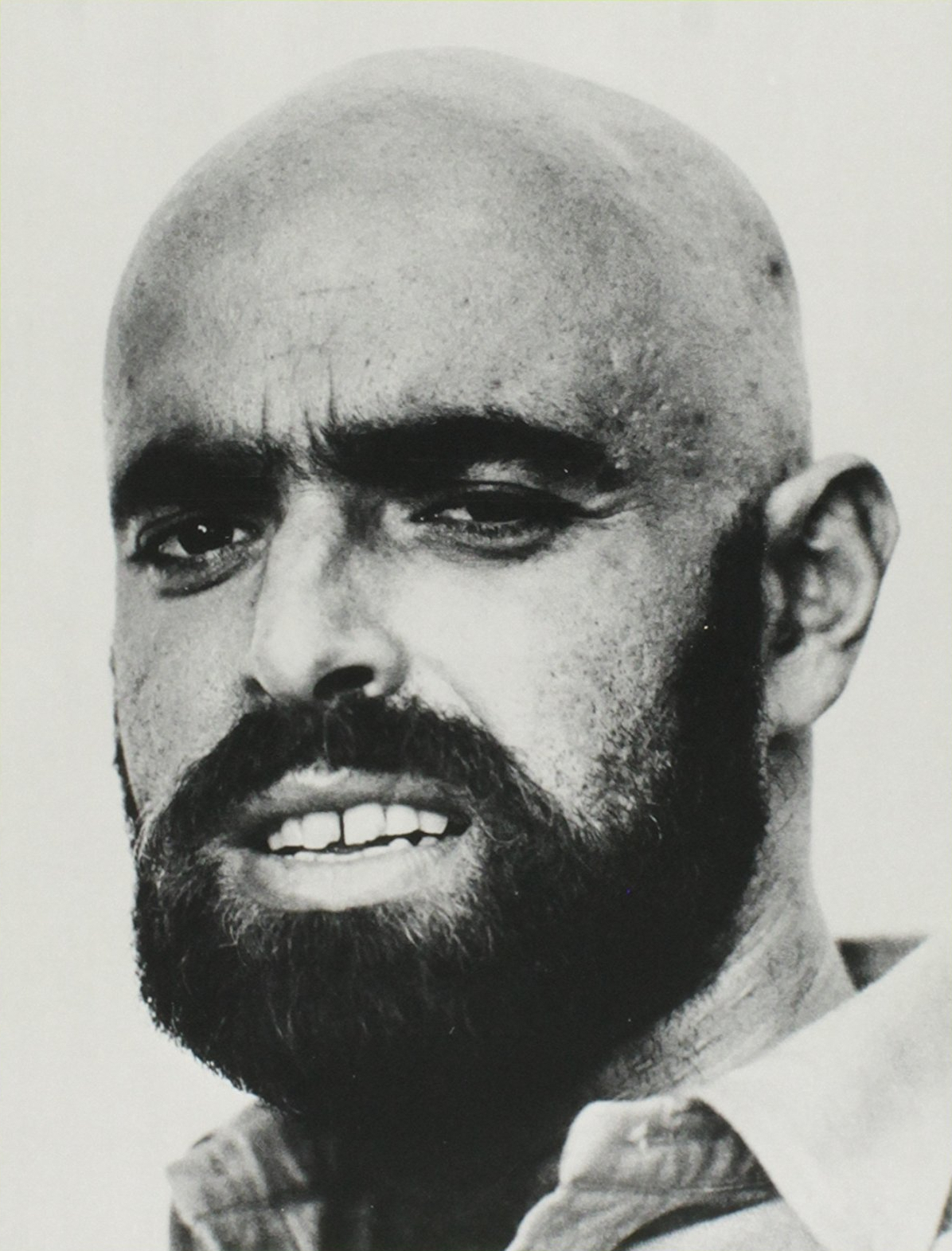
- Silverstein, c. 1964
- Born: Sheldon Allan Silverstein; September 25, 1930; Chicago, Illinois, U.S.
- Died: May 10, 1999 (aged 68); Key West, Florida, U.S.
- Resting place: Westlawn Cemetery, Norridge, Illinois, U.S.
- Occupations: Author; poet; cartoonist; songwriter; playwright
- Children: 2 (1 deceased)
- Writing career
- Pen name: Uncle Shelby
- Genres: Children's fiction; dark comedy
- Military career
- Allegiance: United States
- Branch: United States Army
- Service years: 1949–1955
- Conflicts: Korean War

Sheldon Allan Silverstein (/ˈsɪlvərstiːn/; September 25, 1930 – May 10, 1999) was an American writer, cartoonist, songwriter, and musician. Born and raised in Chicago, Illinois, Silverstein briefly attended college before being drafted into the United States Army. During his rise to prominence in the 1950s, his illustrations were published in various newspapers and magazines, including the adult-oriented Playboy. He also wrote a satirical, adult-oriented alphabet coloring book, Uncle Shelby's ABZ Book.

As a children's author, some of his most acclaimed works include The Giving Tree, Where the Sidewalk Ends, and A Light in the Attic. His works have been translated into more than 47 languages and have sold more than 20 million copies. As a songwriter, Silverstein wrote the 1969 Johnny Cash track "A Boy Named Sue", which peaked at number 2 on the U.S. Billboard Hot 100. His songs have been recorded and popularized by a wide range of other acts including Tompall Glaser, The Irish Rovers, Dr. Hook & the Medicine Show, and Marianne Faithfull. He was the recipient of two Grammy Awards, as well as nominations for both a Golden Globe Award and an Academy Award.

His book A Light in the Attic is dedicated to his daughter, who died at age 11. Silverstein died at home in Key West, Florida, of a heart attack on May 10, 1999, at age 68.

== Early life ==
Sheldon Allan Silverstein was born in Chicago, Illinois, on September 25, 1930. His father, Nathan, was a Jewish immigrant from Russia, and his mother, Helen, was born in Chicago to a Hungarian-Jewish family. They ran a bakery that fared poorly, having been opened during the Great Depression. He grew up in the Albany Park neighborhood of Chicago but spent summers in Kenosha, Wisconsin, at his family's summer home; Kenosha would be referenced in several of his published works, including in A Light in the Attic and Uncle Shelby's ABZ Book. In Chicago, he attended Theodore Roosevelt High School. He then attended the University of Illinois for one semester and was enrolled in the Chicago Academy of Fine Arts for one semester before being drafted into the U.S. Army; he served in Japan and Korea.

== Career ==
=== Cartoons ===
Silverstein's Playboy travelogues, collected in 2007

Silverstein began drawing at age seven by tracing the works of Al Capp. He told Publishers Weekly: "When I was a kid—12 to 14, I'd much rather have been a good baseball player or a hit with the girls, but I couldn't play ball. I couldn't dance. Luckily, the girls didn't want me. Not much I could do about that. So I started to draw and to write. I was also lucky that I didn't have anybody to copy, be impressed by. I had developed my own style; I was creating before I knew there was a Thurber, a Benchley, a Price and a Steinberg. I never saw their work 'til I was around 30. By the time I got to where I was attracting girls, I was already into work, and it was more important to me. Not that I wouldn't rather make love, but the work has become a habit."

He was first published in the Roosevelt Torch, a student newspaper at Roosevelt University, where he studied English after leaving the Art Institute. During his time in the army, his cartoons were published in Pacific Stars and Stripes, where he had originally been assigned to do layouts and paste up. His first book Take Ten, a compilation of his military Take Ten cartoon series, was published by Pacific Stars and Stripes in 1955. He later said his time in college was a waste and would have been better spent traveling around the world meeting people.

After returning to Chicago, Silverstein began submitting cartoons to magazines while also selling hot dogs at Chicago ballparks. His cartoons began appearing in Look, Sports Illustrated and This Week.

Mass-market paperback readers across America were introduced to Silverstein in 1956 when Take Ten was reprinted by Ballantine Books as Grab Your Socks!

In 1957, Silverstein became one of the leading cartoonists in Playboy, which sent him around the world to create an illustrated travel journal with reports from far-flung locales. During the 1950s and 1960s, he produced 23 installments called "Shel Silverstein Visits..." as a feature for Playboy. Employing a sketchbook format with typewriter-styled captions, he documented his own experiences at such locations as a Pennsylvania naturist community, the Chicago White Sox training camp, San Francisco's Haight-Ashbury, Fire Island, Mexico, London, Paris, Spain and Africa. In a Swiss village, he drew himself complaining, "I'll give them 15 more minutes, and if nobody yodels, I'm going back to the hotel." These illustrated travel essays were collected by the publisher Fireside in Playboy's Silverstein Around the World, published in 2007 with a foreword by Hugh Hefner and an introduction by music journalist Mitch Myers.

In a similar vein were his illustrations for John Sack's Report from Practically Nowhere (1959), a collection of humorous travel vignettes previously appearing in Playboy and other magazines.

==== "Now here's my plan..." ====
"Now here's my plan...", Silverstein's best known cartoon of the 1950s became the title of his 1960 cartoon collection.

A cartoon he made during the 1950s was featured on the cover of his next cartoon collection, titled Now Here's My Plan: A Book of Futilities, which was published by Simon & Schuster in 1960. Silverstein biographer Lisa Rogak wrote:

The cartoon on the cover that provides the book's title would turn out to be one of his most famous and often-cited cartoons. In the cartoon, two prisoners are chained to the wall of a prison cell. Both their hands and feet are shackled. One says to the other, "Now here's my plan." Silverstein was both fascinated and distressed by the amount of analysis and commentary that almost immediately began to swirl around the cartoon. "A lot of people said it was a very pessimistic cartoon, which I don't think it is at all," he said. "There's a lot of hope even in a hopeless situation. They analyze it and question it. I did this cartoon because I had an idea about a funny situation about two guys."

Silverstein's cartoons appeared in issues of Playboy from 1957 through the mid-1970s, and one of his Playboy features was expanded into Uncle Shelby's ABZ Book (Simon & Schuster, 1961), his first book of new, original material for adults.

=== Music ===
Ballantine Books published Silverstein's 1956 collection of cartoons from Pacific Stars and Stripes, foreword by Bill Mauldin.

Silverstein studied briefly at Chicago College of Performing Arts at Roosevelt University. Silverstein was associated with the outlaw country movement. His musical output included a large catalog of songs; a number of them were hits for other artists, such as the rock group Dr. Hook & the Medicine Show. He wrote Tompall Glaser's highest-charting solo single "Put Another Log on the Fire", "One's on the Way" and "Hey Loretta" (both hits for Loretta Lynn, in 1971 and 1973 respectively), and "25 Minutes to Go", sung by Johnny Cash, about a man on death row with each line counting down one minute closer. Lynn recorded five songs written by Silverstein. Lynn's producer Owen Bradley once said Silverstein's style of song writing was the most similar to that of Lynn's own writing. Silverstein also wrote one of Cash's biggest hits, "A Boy Named Sue", and released his own recording of the song in 1969. "The Unicorn" was written by Silverstein and recorded in 1962 but is better known in its version by the Irish Rovers. Other songs co-written by Silverstein include "The Taker" written with Kris Kristofferson and recorded by Waylon Jennings, and a sequel to "A Boy Named Sue" titled "Father of a Boy Named Sue", which is less known, but he performed the song on television on The Johnny Cash Show. He also penned a lesser known song titled "Fuck ’Em.”

He wrote the lyrics and music for most of the Dr. Hook & the Medicine Show songs on their first few albums, including "The Cover of "Rolling Stone"", "Freaker's Ball", "Sylvia's Mother", "The Things I Didn't Say" and "Don't Give a Dose to the One You Love Most". He wrote many of the songs performed by Bobby Bare, including "Rosalie's Good Eats Café", "The Mermaid", "The Winner", "Daddy What If", "Warm and Free", and "Tequila Sheila". He co-wrote with Baxter Taylor "Marie Laveau". The third album by Tompall Glaser contained eight songs by Silverstein and three by Silverstein and others.

Silverstein's "The Ballad of Lucy Jordan", first recorded by Dr. Hook in 1975, was re-recorded by Lee Hazlewood (1976), Marianne Faithfull (1979), Belinda Carlisle (1996), and Bobby Bare (2005) and later featured in the films Montenegro and Thelma & Louise. "Queen of the Silver Dollar" was first recorded by Dr. Hook on their 1972 album Sloppy Seconds, and later by Doyle Holly (on his 1973 album Doyle Holly), Emmylou Harris (on her 1975 album Pieces of the Sky) and Dave & Sugar (on their 1976 album Dave & Sugar).

Silverstein composed original music for several films and displayed a musical versatility in these projects, playing guitar, piano, saxophone and trombone. He wrote "In the Hills of Shiloh", a poignant song about the aftermath of the American Civil War, recorded by the New Christy Minstrels, Judy Collins, Bobby Bare, and others. The soundtrack of the 1970 film Ned Kelly features Silverstein songs performed by Waylon Jennings, Kris Kristofferson, and others. He also co-wrote with Waylon the song 'A Long Time Ago'.

In addition, Silverstein wrote "Hey Nelly Nelly", a 1960s-era folk song recorded by Judy Collins.

Silverstein had a popular following on Dr. Demento's radio show. Among his better-known comedy songs were "Sarah Cynthia Sylvia Stout (Would Not Take the Garbage Out)", "The Smoke-Off" (a tale of a contest to determine who could roll—or smoke—marijuana joints faster), "I Got Stoned and I Missed It" and "Stacy Brown Got Two." He wrote the 1962 song "Boa Constrictor", sung by a person who is being swallowed by a snake. The latter song was recorded by the folk group Peter, Paul and Mary, and also by Johnny Cash for his 1966 album Everybody Loves a Nut.

One of Silverstein's last musical projects was Old Dogs, a 1998 album with songs about getting old, all of which Silverstein wrote or co-wrote.

A longtime friend of singer-songwriter Pat Dailey, Silverstein collaborated with him on the posthumously released Underwater Land album (2002). It contains 17 children's songs written and produced by Silverstein and sung by Dailey (with Silverstein joining him on a few tracks). The album features art by Silverstein.

He was a friend of Chicago songwriter Steve Goodman, for whom he wrote the final verse of "What Have You Done For Me Lately?" (refusing a songwriting credit for his contribution).

In 2010, Bobby Bare and his son Bobby Bare Jr produced a CD called Twistable, Turnable Man: A Musical Tribute to the Songs of Shel Silverstein which was released on Sugar Hill Records. Other artists who recorded Silverstein's songs include the Brothers Four, Andrew Bird, My Morning Jacket and Bobby Bare Jr.

=== Theater ===
In January 1959, Look, Charlie: A Short History of the Pratfall was a chaotic off-Broadway comedy staged by Silverstein, Jean Shepherd and Herb Gardner at New York's Orpheum Theatre on Second Avenue on the Lower East Side. Silverstein went on to write more than 100 one-act plays. The Lady or the Tiger Show (1981) and Remember Crazy Zelda? (1984) were produced in New York. The Devil and Billy Markham, published in Playboy in 1979, was later adapted into a solo one-act play that debuted on a double bill with Mamet's Bobby Gould in Hell (1989) with Dr. Hook vocalist Dennis Locorriere narrating. In 1990, Silverstein's one-act modernized version of Hamlet starred Melvin Van Peebles playing all the roles. Karen Kohlhaas directed An Adult Evening of Shel Silverstein, produced by New York's Atlantic Theater Company in September 2001 with a variety of skits:

- "One Tennis Shoe"—Harvey claims his wife is becoming a bag lady.
- "Bus Stop"—Irwin stands on a corner with a "bus stop" sign.
- "Going Once"—A woman auctions herself.
- "The Best Daddy"—Lisa's daddy shot the "pony" he got for her birthday.
- "The Lifeboat is Sinking"—Jen and Sherwin, Husband and Wife, play a game of Who-Would-You-Save-If—the family was drowning.
- "Smile"—Bender plans to punish the man responsible for the phrase "Have a nice day".
- "Watch and Dry"—Marianne discovers her laundry has not been cleaned.
- "Thinking Up a New Name for the Act"—Pete thinks "meat and potatoes" is the perfect name for a vaudeville act.
- "Buy One, Get One Free"—Hookers offer a golden opportunity.
- "Blind Willie and the Talking Dog"—Blind Willie's talking dog argues they could profit from his talent.

A production of An Adult Evening of Shel Silverstein was produced by a Hofstra University theater group named The Spectrum Players, founded by Francis Ford Coppola in 1959. The production used a "victorian sailors on shore leave watching a play" aesthetic and used live rag-time and a character of an emcee not in the script to transition between pieces. The production was directed by Richard Traub of Chicago and starred several of Hofstra's most promising young actors: Nick Pacifico, Amanda Mac, Mike Quattrone, Ross Greenberg, Chelsea Lando, Allie Rightmeyer, and Paolo Perez as the MC.

In December 2001, Shel's Shorts was produced in repertory as two separate evenings under the titles Signs of Trouble and Shel Shocked by the Market Theater in Cambridge, Massachusetts. Signs of Trouble was directed by Wesley Savick, and Shel Shocked was directed by Larry Coen.

On November 29, 2022, a revival of Shel Silverstein's "Lafcadio: The Lion Who Shot Back" opened at the Gishen Hall of the Niavaran Cultural Center in Tehran, Iran. The performance was reviewed in the Tehran Times on December 15, 2022. The review said "But is a famous, successful, and admired lion a happy lion? Or is he a lion at all? Told and drawn with wit and gusto. Shel Silverstein's modern fable speaks not only to children but to us all!"

=== TV and film ===
Silverstein co-wrote the screenplay for Things Change with David Mamet. He also wrote several stories for the TV movie Free to Be... You and Me. Silverstein wrote and narrated an animated short of The Giving Tree, first produced in 1973; a remake based on Silverstein's original screenplay but without his narration was released in 2015 by director Brian Brose. Other credits include the shorts De boom die gaf (based on his novel) and Lafcadio: The Lion Who Shot Back.

His songs have been used in many TV shows and movies, including Almost Famous ("The Cover of Rolling Stone"), Thelma & Louise ("The Ballad of Lucy Jordan"), Postcards from the Edge ("I'm Checkin' Out"), and Coal Miner's Daughter ("One's on the Way"), as well as the Dustin Hoffman film Who Is Harry Kellerman and Why Is He Saying Those Terrible Things About Me? ("Bunky and Lucille", "Last Morning").

== Views on his own writing ==
Ursula Nordstrom, Silverstein's editor at Harper & Row, encouraged Silverstein to write children's poetry. Silverstein said that he had never studied the poetry of others and had therefore developed his own quirky style, laid back and conversational, occasionally employing profanity and slang. In an interview with Publishers Weekly in 1975, he was asked how he came to do children's books:

"I didn't," Shel said, "I never planned to write or draw for kids. It was Tomi Ungerer, a friend of mine, who insisted—practically dragged me, kicking and screaming, into Ursula Nordstrom's office. And she convinced me that Tomi was right; I could do children's books." The relationship between Ursula Nordstrom and Shel Silverstein is mutually rewarding. He considers her a superb editor who knows when to leave an author-illustrator alone. Asked if he would change something he had produced on an editor's say-so, he answered with a flat "No." But he added: "Oh, I will take a suggestion for revision. I do eliminate certain things when I'm writing for children if I think only an adult will get the idea. Then I drop it, or save it. But editors messing with content? No." Had he been surprised by the astronomical record of The Giving Tree, his biggest seller to date and one of the most successful children's books in years? Another emphatic no. "What I do is good," he said. "I wouldn't let it out if I didn't think it was." But The Giving Tree, which has been selling steadily since it appeared almost 10 years ago and has been translated into French, is not his own favorite among his books. "I like Uncle Shelby's ABZ, A Giraffe and a Half, and Lafcadio, the Lion Who Shot Back—I think I like that one the most."

Otto Penzler, in his crime anthology Murder for Revenge (1998), commented on Silverstein's versatility:

The phrase "Renaissance man" tends to get overused these days, but apply it to Shel Silverstein and it practically begins to seem inadequate. Not only has he produced with seeming ease country music hits and popular songs, but he's been equally successful at turning his hand to poetry, short stories, plays, and children's books. Moreover, his whimsically hip fables, beloved by readers of all ages, have made him a stalwart of bestseller lists. A Light in the Attic, most remarkably, showed the kind of staying power on the New York Times chart—two years, to be precise—that most of the biggest names (John Grisham, Stephen King and Michael Crichton) have never equaled with their blockbusters. His unmistakable illustrative style is another crucial element to his appeal. Just as no writer sounds like Shel, no other artist's vision is as delightfully, sophisticatingly cockeyed. One can only marvel that he makes the time to respond so kindly to his friends' requests. In the following work, let's be glad he did. Drawing on his characteristic passion for list making, he shows how the deed is not just in the wish but in the sublimation.

This anthology was the second in a series, which also included Murder for Love (1996) and Murder and Obsession (1999). All three anthologies included Silverstein contributions. He did not really care to conform to any sort of norm, but he did want to leave his mark for others to be inspired by, as he told Publishers Weekly:

I would hope that people, no matter what age, would find something to identify with in my books, pick up one and experience a personal sense of discovery. That's great. I think that if you're a creative person, you should just go about your business, do your work and not care about how it's received. I never read reviews because if you believe the good ones you have to believe the bad ones too. Not that I don't care about success. I do, but only because it lets me do what I want. I was always prepared for success but that means that I have to be prepared for failure too. I have an ego, I have ideas, I want to be articulate, to communicate but in my own way. People who say they create only for themselves and don't care if they are published... I hate to hear talk like that. If it's good, it's too good not to share. That's the way I feel about my work. So I'll keep on communicating, but only my way. Lots of things I won't do. I won't go on television because who am I talking to? Johnny Carson? The camera? Twenty million people I can't see? Uh-uh. And I won't give any more interviews.

== Personal life ==
From around 1967 to 1975, Silverstein lived on a houseboat in Sausalito, California. He also owned homes on Martha's Vineyard, Massachusetts; Greenwich Village, New York; and Key West, Florida. He never married, and according to the 2007 biography A Boy Named Shel, had sex with "hundreds, perhaps thousands of women". He was also a frequent presence at Hugh Hefner's Playboy Mansion and Playboy Clubs.

Silverstein met a woman from Sausalito named Susan Taylor Hastings at the Playboy Mansion, and they had a daughter named Shoshanna Jordan Hastings (b. June 30, 1970). Susan died on June 29, 1975, one day before Shoshanna's fifth birthday, and Shoshanna went to live with her uncle and aunt in Baltimore, Maryland. Shoshanna died of a cerebral aneurysm on April 24, 1982, at age 11. Silverstein's 1981 book A Light in the Attic is dedicated to her. Silverstein later met Key West native Sarah Spencer, who drove a tourist train and inspired Silverstein's song "The Great Conch Train Robbery". They had a son named Matthew De Ver (b. November 10, 1984), who later became a New York City–based songwriter and producer.

== Death ==
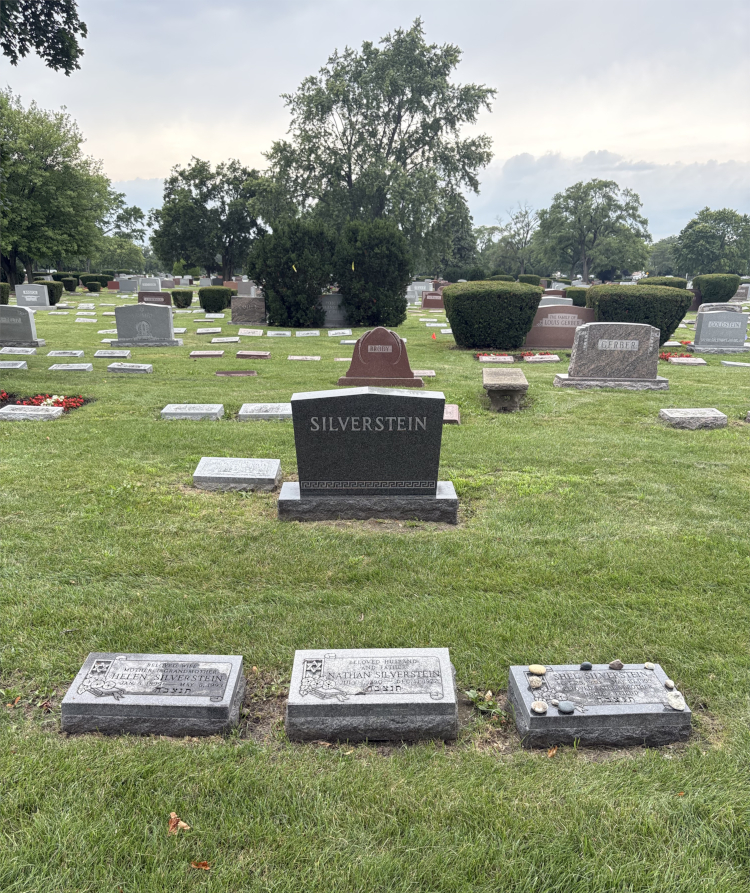
Silverstein's grave (right) at Westlawn Cemetery

On May 10, 1999, Silverstein died at age 68 of heart failure, at his home in Key West, Florida. He had suffered from coronary artery disease and previously suffered two heart attacks. He was buried at Westlawn Cemetery in Norridge, Illinois.

== Awards ==
Silverstein's song "A Boy Named Sue" won a 1970 Grammy. He was nominated for an Academy Award and a Golden Globe Award for his song "I'm Checkin' Out" from the film Postcards from the Edge.

Together with longtime friend and producer Ron Haffkine, Silverstein released "Where the Sidewalk Ends" on cassette in 1983, and as an LP phonograph record in 1984, winning the 1984 Grammy Award for Best Recording For Children.

Silverstein was posthumously inducted into the Nashville Songwriters Hall of Fame in 2002. Silverstein was inducted into the Chicago Literary Hall of Fame in 2014.

== Works ==
=== Books ===
- Take Ten (Pacific Stars and Stripes, 1955)
  - Grab Your Socks! (Ballantine Books, 1956 paperback reissue)
- Now Here's My Plan (Simon & Schuster, 1960) (first collection of American magazine cartoons)
- Uncle Shelby's ABZ Book (Simon & Schuster, 1960) (first book of original material for adults)
- Playboy's Teevee Jeebies (Playboy Press, 1963)
- Uncle Shelby's Story of Lafcadio: The Lion Who Shot Back (Harper & Row, 1963) (first children's book)
- The Giving Tree (Harper & Row, 1964)
- A Giraffe and a Half (Harper & Row, 1964)
- Who Wants a Cheap Rhinoceros? (Macmillan, 1964)
- Uncle Shelby's Zoo: Don't Bump the Glump! and Other Fantasies (Simon & Schuster, 1964) (first collection of poems)
  - Don't Bump the Glump! and Other Fantasies (HarperCollins, 2008 reissue)
- More Playboy's Teevee Jeebies (Playboy Press, 1965)
- Where the Sidewalk Ends (Harper & Row, 1974)
  - Where the Sidewalk Ends (HarperCollins, 2014 reissue)
- The Missing Piece (Harper & Row, 1976)
- The Devil and Billy Markham (Playboy 25th Anniversary Issue, January 1979)
- Different Dances (Harper & Row, 1979)
- A Light in the Attic (Harper & Row, 1981)
  - A Light in the Attic (HarperCollins, 2009 reissue)
- The Missing Piece Meets the Big O (Harper & Row, 1981)
- Falling Up (HarperCollins, 1996, 2015 reissue)
- Draw a Skinny Elephant (HarperCollins, 1998)
- Runny Babbit (HarperCollins, 2005) (published posthumously)
- Every Thing on It (HarperCollins, 2011) (published posthumously)
- Runny Babbit Returns (HarperCollins, 2017) (published posthumously)

Silverstein believed that written works needed to be read on paper, with specific paper for the particular work. He usually would not allow his poems and stories to be published unless he could choose the type, size, shape, color, and quality of the paper. Being a book collector, he took seriously the feel of the paper, the look of the book, the fonts, and the binding. Most of his books did not have paperback editions because he did not want his work to be diminished in any way. Silverstein's estate continues to control copyright permissions on his work and has blocked the quotations of that work in at least one biographical treatment.

=== Albums ===
- Hairy Jazz (Elektra Records) (1959)
- Inside Folk Songs (Atlantic Records) (1962)
- Shel Silverstein's Stag Party (Crestview Records) (1963)
- I'm So Good That I Don't Have to Brag (Cadet/Chess Records) (1966)
- Drain My Brain (Cadet/Chess Records) (1967)
- Boy Named Sue and Other Country Songs (RCA Records) (1969)
- Ned Kelly (United Artists) (1970) film soundtrack
- Who Is Harry Kellerman and Why Is He Saying Those Terrible Things About Me? (Columbia/CBS Records) (1971) film soundtrack
- Freakin' at the Freakers Ball (Columbia/CBS Records) (1972)
- Crouchin' on the Outside (Janus Records), collection of I'm So Good... and Drain My Brain (1973)
- Songs and Stories (Parachute Records) (1978)
- The Great Conch Train Robbery (Flying Fish Records) (1980)
- Where the Sidewalk Ends (Columbia/CBS Records) (1984)
- A Light In the Attic (Columbia/CBS Records) (1985)
- Underwater Land (with Pat Dailey) (Olympia Records) (2002, released posthumously)
- The Best of Shel Silverstein: His Words His Songs His Friends (Legacy/Columbia/SBMG) (2005, released posthumously)

== See also ==
- Sloppy Seconds (album) and Doctor Hook (album), the first two Dr. Hook albums, for which Silverstein wrote all but one song.

== Sources ==
- Flippo, Chet (1998). "Shel Silverstein". In Paul Kingsbury, editor. The Encyclopedia of Country Music. New York: Oxford University Press, p. 484.
- Gold, Marv (2009). Silverstein & Me. Red Hen Press.
- Pond, Steve (January 2006). "The Magical World of Shel Silverstein". Playboy (U.S. edition), pp 74–78 & pp 151–153.
- Rogak, Lisa (2007). A Boy Named Shel: The Life and Times of Shel Silverstein. ISBN 0-312-35359-6.
- Thomas, Joseph (2013). "Executors or Executioners: Why can't my biography of Shel Silverstein quote Shel Silverstein? His censorious estate". Slate, October 13.
