= Lafcadio: The Lion Who Shot Back =

Book by Shel Silverstein

- First edition
- Author: Shel Silverstein
- Illustrator: Shel Silverstein
- Cover artist: Shel Silverstein
- Language: English
- Publication date: 1963
- Publication place: United States
- Pages: 110 pages

Lafcadio: The Lion Who Shot Back, first published in 1963, is a children's story written and illustrated by Shel Silverstein. It is narrated by Shel Silverstein in the voice of a character named Uncle Shelby.

== History ==
Lafcadio first appeared in the November 1963 edition of the Playboy magazine. It was part of a long history of Silverstein's contributions to the magazine and his close relationship with Hugh Hefner, the publication's founder. The story was later turned into a children's book.

== Plot ==
One night, a pride of lions in the African jungle are awakened by the sound of a gunshot and flee. One young male is confused upon hearing that hunters are coming and hides in the grass to spy on the hunters as they pass by. When a solo hunter comes by, he stands up, says hello, and tries to make friends. This offends the hunter's sense of the proper relationship between lion and hunter, and the hunter says he will shoot the young lion. When the hunter finds that he has not loaded his rifle, the young lion decides he does not like the hunter after all and eats him, red cap and all. He tries to eat the gun and the bullets as well, but finds he cannot chew them, so he brings them to the pride instead. An old male (presumably the pride's leader) tells him to throw them away, but the young lion shoots the gun with his tail, causing the other lions to flee. They are angry with the young lion when they discover that he is the one shooting. However, the young lion likes shooting the gun so much that he practices to become the best shot in the whole world.

A year later, when another man comes walking through the jungle, the young lion wants to shoot him, too. However, it is revealed that the man, Finchfinger, is the proprietor of a circus. Finchfinger persuades the reluctant lion to come with him to the circus with the promise of marshmallows. They arrive in the city, which is not at all like the jungle. There are "tall square things" (buildings) and "things that look like hippopotamuses that move very fast with people inside them" (cars). The young lion goes into the hotel and goes up and down the elevator many times. He then meets Uncle Shelby (obviously Shel Silverstein, as he tells the story) and goes to the barbershop, where he gets his paws shined, his claws manicured, and a free haircut. He has dinner, eating many marshmallow dishes, finishing with his napkin for dessert. He wears a marshmallow suit, but it gets ironed and burns all over him. He goes back to the hotel and stays up very late singing the "marshmallow song:"

Marshmallows Marshmallows
Marching Marshing Mellow
Malling Mallows Marshing Fellows
Marshy-Murshy-

The next morning, there is a big parade for the young lion, whose name has been changed to Lafcadio the Great. Lafcadio goes into the circus tent, where he accomplishes a number of stunts with his gun: for example, he shoots six bottles off the table, a hundred balloons off the ceiling, and a marshmallow off everybody's head (including some monkeys). He joins the circus and after many more exploits becomes rich and famous. He begins to behave more and more like humans, standing on his back paws, wearing clothes, playing sports, painting pictures, and so on. He even writes his autobiography.

However, Lafcadio gets tired of his life. Finchfinger comes up with the idea of taking Lafcadio on a trip to Africa. So Lafcadio, along with Finchfinger and some other hunters, goes back to Africa and begins hunting lions. A very old lion realizes that Lafcadio is not a human being but a lion and comes up to talk to him. Lafcadio then remembers that he was a lion, and that in fact he still is a lion. All the lions want him to come back and be a lion with them, but the hunters also want Lafcadio to stay a hunter. Lafcadio cannot make up his mind and says that he does not want to do either and that he does not think that he belongs anywhere. He puts down his gun and walks away, not knowing where he's going and not knowing what's happening to him. Lafcadio has not been heard from since.
