= Where the Sidewalk Ends =

Poetry collection by Shel Silverstein

- Author: Shel Silverstein
- Illustrator: Shel Silverstein
- Cover artist: Shel Silverstein
- Language: English
- Genre: Children's poetry
- Publisher: Harper & Row
- Publication date: November 20, 1974
- Publication place: United States
- Pages: 176
- ISBN: 0-06-025667-2
- OCLC: 1124292
- Dewey Decimal: 811.54
- LC Class: PZ8.3.S5844 Wh

Where the Sidewalk Ends is a 1974 children's poetry collection written and illustrated by Shel Silverstein. It was published by Harper and Row Publishers. The book's poems address common childhood concerns and also present fanciful stories and imaginative images. Silverstein's work is valued by people of all ages, primarily due to his skill in subtly communicating social implications through simple language. Controversial because of its satiric approach to difficult subjects and its theme of challenging authority figures, the book was first banned in 1986 in many libraries and schools.

A 30th Anniversary Edition of the book appeared in 2004, and two audio editions (1983 and 2000) are also available.

== Contents and editions ==
The collection contains a series of poems, including the title poem "Where the Sidewalk Ends", as well as illustrations. The dedication of the book reads “For Ursula”, and the author gives thanks to his editor Ursula Nordstrom, Barbara Borack, Kadijah Cooper, Dorothy Hagen, Beri Greenwald, Gloria Bressler, and Bill Cole.

In 2004, a special 30th Anniversary Edition was published, which included 12 new poems. The following titles are found only in the 30th Anniversary Edition:

- The Truth About Turtles
- Oops!
- Mr. Grumpledump's Song
- Naked Hippo
- Who's Taller?
- Monsters
- Weightliftress
- Don't Tell Me
- Ten-O-Cycle
- The Unfunny Jester
- Open—Close
- Gorilla

=== Title Poem ===
“Where the Sidewalk Ends”, the titular poem, encapsulates the core message of the collection. The reader is told that there is a hidden, mystical place "where the sidewalk ends", between the sidewalk and the street. The poem is divided into three stanzas. Although straying from a consistent metrical pattern, Silverstein gives us a simple rhythm, utilizing predominantly iambic tetrameter. This metrical structure consists of four iambs, each holding an unstressed syllable followed by a stressed syllable.

=== Audio editions ===
==== Original album ====
The audio edition of the book was originally released as an album in 1983, which won the 1984 Grammy Award for Best Recording for Children (Columbia/CBS Records). The collection is "recited, sung, and shouted" by Shel Silverstein himself and produced by Ron Haffkine. Silverstein also performed at the 1984 Grammy Awards.

==== 25th anniversary album ====
In 2000, the album was re-released on cassette and CD for the 25th anniversary of the book. The collection is again "recited, sung, and shouted" by Shel Silverstein.

The 25th anniversary edition also contains 11 previously unreleased tracks culled from the original master tapes.

=== Controversy ===
Where the Sidewalk Ends's satirical humor and tone is viewed as inappropriate by some adults for young readers, due to its sometimes dark themes and illustrations. The book uses satire to address topics such as religion, death, and violence. According to literary critic John M. Kean, "Critics have made unwarranted assumptions about children and their responses to Silverstein's poetry. They assume that children take everything literally, that they have no understanding of the ironic, satirical, or other form of literary humor."
