= A Light in the Attic =

Book of poetry by Shel Silverstein

- Author: Shel Silverstein
- Illustrator: Shel Silverstein
- Cover artist: Larry Moyer
- Language: English
- Genre: Children's poetry
- Publisher: Harper & Row
- Publication date: 1981
- Publication place: United States
- Pages: 169
- ISBN: 0-06-025673-7
- OCLC: 7574216

A Light in the Attic is a book of poems by American poet, writer, and musician Shel Silverstein. The book consists of 135 poems accompanied by illustrations also created by Silverstein. It was first published by Harper & Row Junior Books in 1981 and was a bestseller for months after its publication, but it has also been the subject of controversy regarding some of its content.

== Development ==
In the back of the book, Silverstein credits author Charlotte Zolotow, Harper's publicist Joan Robins, Harper's executive editor Robert Warren, author James Skofield, private secretary Glenise Butcher, and John Vitale of HarperCollins. He also thanks Harper & Row editor Ursula Nordstrom. The book was published in Harper's Junior Books division in 1981, but was marketed towards adults as well.

== Summary ==
There are 135 poems in this book.

== Reception ==
A Light in the Attic was number two on the New York Times bestseller list soon after its publication and remained on the list for 50 consecutive weeks. It sold more than 575,000 copies in the first year.

== Influence and legacy ==
A Light in the Attic was praised by critics and audiences for years after its publication. In the fall of 2001, HarperCollins Children's Books honored the 20th anniversary of the book with a special edition release that featured a separate CD of 11 poems performed by the beloved poet. It was the first children's book to break onto the Adult New York Times Best Sellers list where it remained for 181 weeks.

Silverstein died from a heart attack on May 11, 1999, at the age of 68. According to an obituary published by The Washington Post, "To millions of children and adults, Mr. Silverstein was a master of whimsy and light satire, which he delivered in verse--sometimes downright goofy--that tapped a universal sense of the absurd."

== Controversies ==
Attempts have been made to ban the book from some libraries in the United States, parents claiming that the poem "How Not to Have to Dry the Dishes" encourages messiness and disobedience. The poem "Little Abigail and the Beautiful Pony" resulted in criticism for describing the death of a little girl whose parents refuse to buy her a pony. This resulted in the book being banned by the Fruitland Park Elementary School in Lake County, Florida. The decision, however, was later reversed by an advisory committee of parents and teachers.

== Awards ==
Winner of the 1984 William Allen White Children's Book Award.

Winner of the 1984 Garden State Children's Book Award for nonfiction from the New Jersey Library Association.

Named a 1981 American Library Association Notable Children's Book.

Named a 1981 School Library Journal Best Book.

Awards
Preceded by Peppermints in the Parlor	Winner of the William Allen White Children's Book Award; 1984	Succeeded by The Land I Lost
