= List of Disney video games =

This is a list of video games featuring various Disney properties.

== Disney Television Animation games ==
Various games have been based on original Disney Television Animation series.

=== The Disney Afternoon ===
The following games are based around DuckTales, Darkwing Duck and other Disney Afternoon properties.

| Main title / alternate title(s) | Developer | Release date | System(s) |
|---|---|---|---|
| DuckTales | Capcom | 1989 | NES; Game Boy |
| DuckTales: The Quest for Gold | Incredible Technologies | 1990 | DOS; PC Windows; Amiga; Apple II; Commodore 64; Macintosh |
| DuckTales | Tiger Electronics | 1990 | Handheld LCD |
| Chip 'n Dale Rescue Rangers | Capcom | 1990 | NES |
| Chip 'n Dale Rescue Rangers: The Adventures in Nimnul's Castle | Hi Tech Expressions | 1990 | DOS |
| Chip 'n Dale Rescue Rangers | Tiger Electronics | 1990 | Handheld LCD |
| TaleSpin | Capcom | 1991 | NES; Game Boy |
| TaleSpin | Tiger Electronics | 1991 | Handheld LCD |
| TaleSpin | NEC | 1991 | TurboGrafx-16 |
| TaleSpin | Sega of America | 1992 | Genesis; Game Gear |
| Darkwing Duck | Capcom | 1992 | NES; Game Boy |
| Darkwing Duck | Interactive Designs | 1992 | TurboGrafx-16 |
| Darkwing Duck | Tiger Electronics | 1992 | Handheld LCD |
| DuckTales 2 | Capcom | 1993 | NES; Game Boy |
| Goof Troop | Capcom | 1993 | Super NES |
| Disney's Goof Troop | Tiger Electronics | 1993 | Handheld LCD |
| Chip 'n Dale Rescue Rangers 2 | Capcom | 1993 | NES |
| Bonkers | Sun L | 1994 | Super NES |
| Disney's Bonkers | Sega of America | 1994 | Genesis |
| Bonkers: Wax Up! | SIMS | 1995 | Master System (Brazil only); Game Gear |
| Gargoyles | Buena Vista Interactive | 1995 | Genesis |
| Gargoyles | Tiger Electronics | 1995 | Handheld LCD |
| Mighty Ducks | Tiger Electronics | 1996 | Electronic LCD Game |
| Disney's Extremely Goofy Skateboarding | Krome Studios | 2001 | Windows |
| Darkwing Duck | Disney Mobile Studios | 2010 | Mobile phone |
| Chip 'n Dale Rescue Rangers | Dynamic Pixels | 2010 | Mobile phone |
| DuckTales: Scrooge's Loot | Disney Mobile Studios | 2013 | iOS |
| DuckTales: Remastered | WayForward Technologies | 2013 | Microsoft Windows; Xbox 360; PlayStation 3 Wii U iOS |
| The DuckForce Rises | Sanoma Media/Disney Mobile Studios | 2015 | iOS |
| The Disney Afternoon Collection | Digital Eclipse | 2017 | Microsoft Windows; Xbox One; PlayStation 4 Nintendo Switch; Nintendo Switch 2 |
| Gargoyles Remastered | Empty Clip Studios | 2023 | Microsoft Windows; Xbox One; PlayStation 4 Xbox Series X/S; Nintendo Switch |

=== Other animated TV series ===
The following games are based around animated TV series produced by Disney Television Animation which were not part of The Disney Afternoon, or aired on Disney Channel.

| Main title / alternate title(s) | Developer | Release date | System(s) |
|---|---|---|---|
| Nightmare Ned | Creative Capers Entertainment | 1997 | Windows |
| Doug's Big Game | NewKidCo | 2000 | Game Boy Color |
| Kim Possible: Revenge of Monkey Fist | Digital Eclipse Software | 2002 | Game Boy Advance |
| Disney's Kim Possible 2: Drakken's Demise | A2M | 2004 | Game Boy Advance |
| Lilo & Stitch 2: Hämsterviel Havoc | Climax Studios | 2004 | Game Boy Advance |
| Disney's Kim Possible 3: Team Possible | A2M | 2005 | Game Boy Advance |
| The Proud Family | Gorilla Systems | 2005 | Game Boy Advance |
| Kim Possible: Kimmunicator | A2M | 2005 | Nintendo DS |
| Disney's Kim Possible: What's the Switch? | A2M | 2006 | PlayStation 2 |
| American Dragon: Jake Long – Attack of the Dark Dragon | WayForward Technologies | 2006 | Nintendo DS |
| Disney's Kim Possible: Global Gemini | A2M | 2007 | Nintendo DS |
| Phineas and Ferb | Altron | 2009 | Nintendo DS |
| Disney Stitch Jam | Cattle Call | 2009 | Nintendo DS |
| Phineas and Ferb: Ride Again | Altron | 2010 | Nintendo DS |
| Motto! Stitch! DS: Rhythm de Rakugaki Daisakusen | Cattle Call | 2010 | Nintendo DS (Japan only) |
| Phineas and Ferb: Across the 2nd Dimension | High Impact Games | 2011 | Wii; PlayStation 3 PSP |
| Phineas and Ferb: Across the 2nd Dimension | Altron | 2011 | Nintendo DS |
| Phineas and Ferb | Leapfrog | 2012 | Leapster Explorer; LeapPad Explorer |
| Where's My Perry? | Disney Interactive Studios | 2012 | Android iOS |
| Disney's Fish Hooks | Disney Mobile | 2012 | iOS |
| Just Dance: Disney Party | Ubisoft | 2012 | Wii; Xbox 360 |
| Phineas and Ferb: Quest for Cool Stuff | Behaviour Interactive | 2013 | Wii U Wii; Nintendo 3DS; Nintendo DS; Xbox 360 |
| Agent Ball | Disney Mobile | 2014 | iOS (Japan only); Android (Japan only) |
| Phineas and Ferb: Day of Doofenshmirtz | SCEA | 2015 | PlayStation Vita |
| Phineas and Ferb: New Inventions | Disney Interactive Studios | 2015 | Microsoft Windows |
| Gravity Falls: Legend of the Gnome Gemulets | Ubisoft Osaka, Ubisoft San Francisco, Access Games, Success Corp. | 2015 | Nintendo 3DS |
| Just Dance: Disney Party 2 | Ubisoft | 2015 | Wii; Wii U Xbox 360; Xbox One |

== Pixar games ==
| Main title / alternate title(s) | Developer | Release date | System(s) |
|---|---|---|---|
| Toy Story | Traveller's Tales; Tiertex (Game Boy) | 1995 | Super NES, Sega Mega Drive/Genesis, Game Boy |
| Disney's Animated Storybook: Toy Story | Media Station | 1996 | Windows 16-bit, Macintosh |
| Disney's Toy Story Activity Center | Media Station | 1996 | Windows 16-bit, Macintosh |
| A Bug's Life | Traveller's Tales | 1998 | PlayStation, Windows, Nintendo 64 |
| A Bug's Life | Tiertex | 1998 | Game Boy Color |
| Toy Story 2: Buzz Lightyear to the Rescue | Traveller's Tales | 1999 | PlayStation, Nintendo 64, Sega Dreamcast, Windows |
| Toy Story 2 | Tiertex Design Studios | 1999 | Game Boy Color |
| Disney's Activity Center: Disney • Pixar Toy Story 2 | Engineering Animation Inc. | 1999 | Windows |
| Disney's Activity Centre: Disney•Pixar A Bug's Life | Engineering Animation Inc. | 1999 | Windows, PlayStation |
| A Bug's Life | SEGA Toys Co., Ltd. | 1999 | SEGA Pico |
| Buzz Lightyear of Star Command | Traveller's Tales | 2000 | Sega Dreamcast, PlayStation, Windows |
| Buzz Lightyear of Star Command | Traveller's Tales | 2000 | Game Boy Color |
| Buzz Lightyear: 2nd Grade | Human Code, Inc. | 2000 | Windows |
| Toy Story Racer | Traveller's Tales | 2001 | PlayStation |
| Toy Story Racer | Tiertex Design Studios | 2001 | Game Boy Color |
| Monsters, Inc. | Vicarious Visions | 2001 | Game Boy Color |
| Monsters, Inc. | Natsume | 2001 | Game Boy Advance |
| Monsters, Inc. Scream Team | Artificial Mind and Movement | 2001 | PlayStation, PlayStation 2, Microsoft Windows |
| Monsters, Inc.: Scream Team Training | Gorilla Systems Corporation | 2001 | Windows |
| Monsters Inc.: Monster Tag | Sapient Interactive | 2001 | Windows |
| Monsters Inc.: Wreck Room Arcade – Bowling for Screams | Sapient Interactive | 2001 | Windows |
| Monsters Inc.: Wreck Room Arcade – Eight Ball Chaos | Sapient Interactive | 2001 | Windows |
| Monsters Inc.: Pinball Panic Mini Game | Sapient Interactive | 2001 | Windows |
| Monsters, Inc. | Kodiak Interactive | 2002 | PlayStation 2 |
| Mike's Monstrous Adventure | Hulabee Entertainment | 2002 | Windows |
| Monsters, Inc. Scream Arena | Radical Entertainment | 2002 | GameCube |
| Finding Nemo | Traveller's Tales | 2003 | Mobile phone, PlayStation 2, Xbox, GameCube |
| Finding Nemo | KnowWonder | 2003 | Macintosh, Microsoft Windows |
| Finding Nemo | Vicarious Visions | 2003 | Game Boy Advance |
| Finding Nemo: Nemo's Underwater World of Fun | KnowWonder | 2003 | Windows |
| The Incredibles | Heavy Iron Studios; Beenox | 2004 | GameCube, PlayStation 2, Xbox, Microsoft Windows, OS X |
| The Incredibles | Helixe | 2004 | Game Boy Advance |
| The Incredibles: When Danger Calls | ImaginEngine | 2004 | Windows, Macintosh |
| The Incredibles: Escape from Nomanisan Island | Backbone Entertainment | 2004 | Windows |
| Finding Nemo: The Continuing Adventures | Altron | 2004 | Game Boy Advance |
| The Incredibles: Rise of the Underminer | Heavy Iron Studios (PS2, Xbox, GC); Beenox (PC, Mac) | 2005 | Microsoft Windows, Mac OS X, PlayStation 2, GameCube, Xbox |
| The Incredibles: Rise of the Underminer | Helixe | 2005 | Game Boy Advance |
| The Incredibles: Rise of the Underminer | Helixe | 2006 | Nintendo DS |
| Finding Nemo: Escape to the Big Blue | Altron | 2006 | Nintendo DS, Nintendo 3DS |
| Finding Nemo: Learning With Nemo | InLight Entertainment Inc. | 2006 | Windows |
| The Incredibles: Mission Incredible | VTech Electronics North America, L.L.C. | 2006 | V.Flash |
| Cars | Rainbow Studios (PlayStation 2, GameCube, Xbox, Xbox 360); Beenox (Microsoft Windows); Incinerator Studios (Wii) | 2006 | PlayStation 2, GameCube, Xbox, Microsoft Windows, Xbox 360, Wii |
| Cars | Locomotive Games | 2006 | PlayStation Portable |
| Cars | Helixe | 2006 | Nintendo DS |
| Cars | Helixe | 2006 | Game Boy Advance |
| Cars: Radiator Springs Adventures | Rainbow Studios, AWE Games | 2006 | Macintosh, Microsoft Windows |
| Cars: In the Fast Lane | VTech Electronics North America, L.L.C. | 2006 | V.Flash |
| Ratatouille | Asobo Studio (PS2/Xbox/GC/Wii/PC/Mac) | 2007 | Wii, PlayStation 2, Xbox, GameCube, Microsoft Windows, OS X |
| Ratatouille | Heavy Iron Studios | 2007 | PlayStation 3, Xbox 360 |
| Ratatouille | Helixe | 2007 | Game Boy Advance |
| Ratatouille | Helixe | 2007 | Nintendo DS |
| Ratatouille | Locomotive Games | 2007 | PSP |
| Ratatouille | Firemint Pty Ltd. | 2007 | J2ME |
| Ratatouille: Food Frenzy | Helixe | 2007 | Nintendo DS |
| Ratatouille: Cheese Rush | Universomo, Ltd. | 2007 | J2ME |
| Cars Mater-National Championship | Rainbow Studios (PlayStation 2, Xbox 360, Microsoft Windows); Incinerator Studios (PlayStation 3, Wii) | 2007 | PlayStation 2, PlayStation 3, Xbox 360, Microsoft Windows, Wii |
| Cars Mater-National Championship | Tantalus Interactive | 2007 | Game Boy Advance |
| Cars Mater-National Championship | Tantalus Interactive | 2007 | Nintendo DS |
| WALL-E | Asobo Studio (PS2/PSP/PC/Mac); Savage Entertainment (PSP) | 2008 | Microsoft Windows, PlayStation 2, PlayStation Portable, Mac OS X |
| WALL-E | Helixe | 2008 | Nintendo DS |
| WALL-E | Heavy Iron Studios | 2008 | Wii, Xbox 360, PlayStation 3 |
| Up | Asobo Studio (PS2/PSP/PC/Mac) | 2009 | iOS, PlayStation 2, PlayStation Portable, Mac OS X, Microsoft Windows, mobile phone, Leapster, V.Smile |
| Up | Altron | 2009 | Nintendo DS |
| Up | Heavy Iron Studios | 2009 | Xbox 360, Wii, PlayStation 3 |
| Cars Race-O-Rama | Incinerator Studios (PlayStation 2, PlayStation 3, Xbox 360, Wii) | 2009 | PlayStation 2, PlayStation 3, Wii, Xbox 360 |
| Cars Race-O-Rama | Tantalus Media | 2009 | PlayStation Portable, Nintendo DS |
| Toy Story Mania! | Papaya Studio Corporation | 2009 | Wii |
| Toy Story 3 | TransGaming (OS X); Asobo Studio (PlayStation 2, PlayStation Portable); Disney Mobile Studios (iOS) | 2010 | PlayStation 2, PlayStation Portable, |
| Toy Story 3 | n-Space | 2010 | Nintendo DS |
| Toy Story 3 | Avalanche Software | 2010 | Wii, Microsoft Windows, Xbox 360, PlayStation 3 |
| Cars Toon: Mater's Tall Tales | Papaya Studio | 2010 | Microsoft Windows, Wii |
| Cars 2 | Avalanche Software (PlayStation 3, Xbox 360, Microsoft Windows, Wii); TransGaming (OS X); Disney Mobile Studios (iOS); Raw Thrills (Arcade) | 2011 | Wii, PlayStation 3, Xbox 360, Microsoft Windows |
| Cars 2 | Firebrand Games | 2011 | Nintendo DS, Nintendo 3DS |
| Cars 2 | Virtual Toys | 2011 | PlayStation Portable |
| Cars 2 | LeapFrog Enterprises, Inc. | 2011 | Leapster |
| Kinect Rush: A Disney–Pixar Adventure | Asobo Studio | 2012 | Xbox 360 |
| Brave | Behaviour Interactive | 2012 | PlayStation 3, Wii, Xbox 360, Microsoft Windows, Mac OS X |
| Brave | Behaviour Interactive | 2012 | Nintendo DS |
| Toy Story: Smash It! | Disney Mobile | 2013 | iOS, Android |
| Inside Out: Thought Bubbles | Disney Mobile (2015–2020); Kongregate (since 2020) | 2015 | iOS, Android |
| Cars 3: Driven to Win | Avalanche Software, Warner Bros. Interactive Entertainment | 2017 | Nintendo Switch, Wii U, PlayStation 4, PlayStation 3, Xbox One, Xbox 360 |
| Rush: A Disney–Pixar Adventure | Asobo Studio | 2017 | Xbox One, Microsoft Windows |
| Lego The Incredibles | TT Games, Warner Bros. Interactive Entertainment | 2018 | Nintendo Switch, PlayStation 4, Xbox One, macOS, Windows |
| Toy Story Drop! | Disney Mobile | 2019 | iOS, Android |

== Miscellaneous Disney games ==
The following games are based on Disney's other animated television series, theme park rides, live-action films, and film licenses.

=== Tron ===
The following games are from the Tron series.

| Main title / alternate title(s) | Developer | Release date | System(s) |
|---|---|---|---|
| Tron | Bally/Midway, ENCOM International | 1982 | Arcade |
| Tron | TOMY | 1982 | Handheld |
| Adventures of Tron | APh Technological Consulting | 1982 | Atari 2600 |
| Tron: Deadly Discs | Mattel | 1982 | Intellivision Atari 2600 |
| Tron: Solar Sailer | Mattel | 1982 | Intellivision |
| Tron: Maze-A-Tron | Mattel | 1982 | Intellivision |
| Discs of Tron | Bally/Midway | 1983 | Arcade, Commodore 64 |
| Tron 2.0 | Monolith Productions | 2003 | Windows, Xbox, Macintosh |
| Tron 2.0: Light Cycles | Lavastorm | 2003 | Mobile phone |
| Tron 2.0: Killer App | Digital Eclipse | 2004 | Game Boy Advance |
| Tron 2.0: Discs of Tron | Lavastorm | 2004 | Mobile phone |
| Tron: Evolution | Propaganda Games | 2010 | Windows, PlayStation 3, Xbox 360, PlayStation Portable |
| Tron: Evolution – Battle Grids | n-Space | 2010 | Wii, Nintendo DS |
| Tron: Legacy | SuperVillain Studios | 2010 | iOS |
| Tron RUN/r | Sanzaru Games | 2016 | Windows, PlayStation 4, Xbox One |
| Tron: Identity | Bithell Games | 2023 | Windows, Nintendo Switch |

=== Roger Rabbit ===
The following games are based around the character Roger Rabbit.

| Main title / alternate title(s) | Developer | Release date | System(s) |
|---|---|---|---|
| Who Framed Roger Rabbit | Silent Software | 1988 | DOS; Commodore 64; Amiga |
| Roger Rabbit | Kemco | 1989 | FDS |
| Who Framed Roger Rabbit | Rare | 1989 | NES |
| Hare Raising Havoc | BlueSky Software | 1991 | DOS; Amiga |
| Who Framed Roger Rabbit | Capcom | 1991 | Game Boy |

=== Dick Tracy ===
The following games are based around the 1990 film of the same name.

| Main title / alternate title(s) | Developer | Release date | System(s) |
|---|---|---|---|
| Dick Tracy | Realtime Associates | 1990 | NES, Game Boy |
| Dick Tracy | Titus Software | 1990 | Amiga, Atari ST, Commodore 64, DOS, Amstrad CPC, ZX Spectrum, GX4000 |
| Dick Tracy | Sega | 1991 | Sega Mega Drive/Genesis, Master System |
| Dick Tracy: The Crime Solving Adventure | Distinctive Software | 1991 | Amiga, DOS |

=== The Rocketeer ===
The following games are based around the 1991 film of the same name.

| Main title / alternate title(s) | Developer(s) | Release date | System(s) |
|---|---|---|---|
| The Rocketeer | Realtime Associates, Ironwind Software | 1991 | NES |
| The Rocketeer | NovaLogic | 1992 | DOS, Super NES |

=== The Nightmare Before Christmas ===
| Main title / alternate title(s) | Developer | Release date | System(s) |
|---|---|---|---|
| The Nightmare Before Christmas: Oogie's Revenge | Capcom | 2004 | PlayStation 2 Xbox |
| The Nightmare Before Christmas: The Pumpkin King | Tose | 2005 | Game Boy Advance |
| The Nightmare Before Christmas | Happy Fun Team | 2007 | Mobile phone |

=== Pirates of the Caribbean ===
The following games are from the Pirates of the Caribbean series.

| Main title / alternate title(s) | Developer | Release date | System(s) |
|---|---|---|---|
| Pirates of the Caribbean: Battle for Buccaneer Gold | Walt Disney Imagineering | 2000 | DisneyQuest |
| Pirates of the Caribbean | Bethesda Softworks | 2003 | Microsoft Windows, Xbox |
| Pirates of the Caribbean Multiplayer Mobile | Disney Interactive | 2003 | mobile phones |
| Pirates of the Caribbean Pinball | Schell Games, LLC | 2005 | Windows |
| Pirates of the Caribbean Online | Disney Interactive | 2007 | Online |
| Pirates of the Caribbean: The Curse of the Black Pearl | Pocket Studios | 2003 | Game Boy Advance |
| Pirates of the Caribbean: The Legend of Jack Sparrow | 7 Studios | 2006 | PlayStation 2, Windows |
| Pirates of the Caribbean: Dead Man's Chest | Griptonite Games | 2006 | PlayStation Portable, Mobile phone |
| Pirates of the Caribbean: Dead Man's Chest | Amaze Entertainment | 2006 | Nintendo DS |
| Pirates of the Caribbean: Dead Man's Chest | Amaze Entertainment | 2006 | Game Boy Advance |
| Pirates of the Caribbean: At World's End | Eurocom | 2007 | Xbox 360, PlayStation 3, PC, PlayStation 2, PlayStation Portable, Wii |
| Pirates of the Caribbean: At World's End | Capybara Games | 2007 | J2ME |
| Pirates of the Caribbean: At World's End | Amaze Entertainment | 2007 | Nintendo DS |
| Pirates of the Caribbean: Armada of the Damned | Propaganda Games | Cancelled | Microsoft Windows, PlayStation 3, Xbox 360 |
| Lego Pirates of the Caribbean: The Video Game | Traveller's Tales | 2011 | Microsoft Windows, Mac OS X, PlayStation 3, Wii, Xbox 360 |
| Lego Pirates of the Caribbean: The Video Game | TT Fusion | 2011 | Nintendo 3DS, Nintendo DS, PlayStation Portable |
| Pirates of the Caribbean: Master of the Seas | Disney Interactive | 2011 | Android, iOS |

=== Other games ===
| Main title / alternate title(s) | Developer | Release date | System(s) |
|---|---|---|---|
| The Chase on Tom Sawyer's Island | Walt Disney Computer Software | 1988 | Apple II, Commodore 64, DOS |
| Disney Animation Studio | Disney Interactive | 1990 | Amiga, DOS |
| Arachnophobia | BlueSky Software | 1991 | Amiga, Amstrad CPC, Commodore 64, DOS |
| Home Improvement: Power Tool Pursuit! | Imagineering | 1994 | Super NES |
| Ultimate Ride | Gigawatt Studios | 2001 | Windows |
| Toontown Online | Disney's Virtual Reality Studio | 2003 | Windows, Macintosh |
| The Haunted Mansion | High Voltage Software | 2003 | PlayStation 2, Xbox, GameCube |
| The Haunted Mansion | Pocket Studios | Cancelled | Game Boy Advance |
| Disney's Extreme Skate Adventure | Toys for Bob | 2003 | PlayStation 2, Xbox, GameCube |
| Disney's Extreme Skate Adventure | Vicarious Visions | 2003 | Game Boy Advance |
| King Arthur | Krome Studios, Lavastorm Analytics | 2004 | Xbox, PlayStation 2, GameCube, Mobile phone |
| Disney Move | Artificial Mind & Movement | 2004 | PlayStation (Europe only) |
| Little Einsteins | InLight Entertainment | 2006 | Game Boy Advance |
| Disney Friends | Amaze Entertainment | 2007 | Nintendo DS |
| Disney Think Fast | Magenta Software | 2008 | PlayStation 2, Wii |
| Disney Othello | Disney Mobile | 2009 | Mobile phone (Japan only) |
| The Game of Life: Disney Edition | Tomy Corporation | 2009 | Mobile phone (Japan only) |
| Alice in Wonderland | Étranges Libellules | 2010 | Wii, Windows |
| Alice in Wonderland: An Adventure Beyond the Mirror | Disney Interactive Studios Beijing | 2010 | Zeebo |
| Alice in Wonderland | Étranges Libellules | 2010 | Nintendo DS |
| The Sorcerer's Apprentice | Headstrong Games | 2010 | Nintendo DS |
| Disney Universe | Eurocom | 2011 | Windows, PlayStation 3, Wii, Xbox 360 |
| Disney Party | Disney Mobile | 2012 | Mobile phone (Japan) |
| Disney Fantasy Quest | Disney Mobile | 2012 | Mobile phone (Japan) |
| Disney's Harapeko Restaurant | Disney Mobile | 2013 | iOS, Android |
| Disney Infinity | Avalanche Software | 2013 | Wii, Xbox 360, Wii U, PlayStation 3, Windows |
| Disney Infinity | Altron | 2013 | Nintendo 3DS |
| Disney Tsum Tsum | Line Corporation | 2014 | iOS, Android |
| Maleficent Free Fall | Disney Mobile (2014–2020), Kongregate (since 2020) | 2014 | iOS, Android |
| Disney Infinity 2.0 | Avalanche Software | 2014 | iOS, Xbox 360, Xbox One, Wii U, PlayStation 3, PlayStation 4, Nintendo 3DS, Windows |
| Disney Ranch Game: Magic Castle Dream Island | Marvelous | 2014 | iOS, Android |
| Miles from Tomorrowland: Missions | Disney Enterprises | 2015 | iOS |
| Disney Infinity 3.0 | Avalanche Software | 2015 | iOS, Xbox 360, Xbox One, Wii U, PlayStation 3, PlayStation 4, Windows, Android |
| Disney My Little Doll | Cocone | 2016 (Japan)/2022 (internationally) | iOS, Android |
| Disney Crossy Road | Hipster Whale | 2016 | iOS, Android |
| Disney Emoji Blitz | Disney Mobile (2016–2018); Jam City (since 2018) | 2016 | iOS, Android |
| Disney Crossy Road Arcade | Adrenaline Amusements | 2017 | Arcade |
| Disney's Super Arcade | DisneyNOW | 2018 | iOS, Android |
| Disney Heroes: Battle Mode | PerBlue | 2018 | iOS, Android |
| Disney Tsum Tsum Festival | B.B. Studio, Hyde | 2019 | Nintendo Switch |
| Disney Sorcerer's Arena | Glu Mobile | 2020 | iOS, Android |
| Disney Mirrorverse | Kabam | 2022 | iOS, Android |
| Disney Dreamlight Valley | Gameloft | 2022 (early access)/2023 (full release) | Xbox One, Xbox Series, Windows, Nintendo Switch, PlayStation 4, PlayStation 5, Steam Deck, iOS, Android |
| Disney Speedstorm | Gameloft | 2023 | Xbox One, Xbox Series, Windows, Nintendo Switch, PlayStation 4, PlayStation 5, Steam Deck, iOS, Android |
| Disney Villains Cursed Café | Bloom Digital Media | 2025 | Xbox Series, Windows, Nintendo Switch, PlayStation 5 |

=== Disney Parks games ===
Games based on Disney theme parks and resorts.

| Main title / alternate title(s) | Developer | Publisher | Release date | System(s) |
|---|---|---|---|---|
| Adventures in the Magic Kingdom | Capcom | Capcom | 1990 | NES |
| Coaster | Code To Go | Disney Software | 1993 | DOS |
| The Walt Disney World Explorer; The Walt Disney World Explorer – Second Edition | Mindsai Productions; Disney Interactive | Disney Interactive | 1996; 1998 (Second Edition) | Windows; Mac OS |
| Walt Disney World Quest: Magical Racing Tour | Crystal Dynamics; LTI Gray Matter (Windows) | Eidos Interactive | 2000 | Dreamcast; Windows; PlayStation |
| Walt Disney World Quest: Magical Racing Tour | Prolific Publishing | Eidos Interactive | 2000 | Game Boy Color |
| Adventure of Tokyo DisneySea | Konami | Konami | 2001 | PlayStation 2 |
| Adventure of Tokyo DisneySea | Konami | Konami | 2001 | Game Boy Advance |
| Virtual Magic Kingdom | Sulake | The Walt Disney Company | 2005 | Windows |
| Kinect: Disneyland Adventures; Disneyland Adventures | Frontier Developments; Asobo Studio (remaster) | Microsoft Studios | 2011; 2017 (remaster) | Xbox 360; Xbox One (remaster); Windows (remaster) |
| Disney Magical World | h.a.n.d. Bandai Namco Games | Bandai Namco Games (Japan); Nintendo (internationally) | 2013/2014 | Nintendo 3DS |
| Disney My Land | Disney Mobile Japan | Disney Mobile | 2011 | Mobile phone (Japan) |
| Disney Magical World 2 Disney Magical World 2: Enchanted Edition | h.a.n.d. Bandai Namco Games | Bandai Namco Games (Japan); Nintendo (North America and PAL region; 3DS only) | 2015/2016; 2021 (Enchanted Edition) | Nintendo 3DS; Nintendo Switch (Enchanted Edition) |
| Disney Magic Kingdoms | Gameloft | Gameloft | 2016 | iOS; Android; Windows |

=== Kingdom Hearts games ===
The following games are from the Kingdom Hearts series by Square Enix. They incorporate characters from various Disney properties as well as from Square Enix video game series including Final Fantasy and The World Ends with You.

| Main title / alternate title(s) | Developer | Release date | System(s) |
|---|---|---|---|
| Kingdom Hearts | Square | 2002 | PlayStation 2 |
| Kingdom Hearts: Chain of Memories | Square Enix, Jupiter | 2004 | Game Boy Advance |
| Kingdom Hearts II | Square Enix | 2005 | PlayStation 2 |
| Kingdom Hearts Re:Chain of Memories | Square Enix | 2007 | PlayStation 2 |
| Kingdom Hearts Coded | Square Enix | 2008 | Mobile phone |
| Kingdom Hearts 358/2 Days | Square Enix, h.a.n.d. | 2009 | Nintendo DS |
| Kingdom Hearts Birth by Sleep | Square Enix | 2010 | PlayStation Portable |
| Kingdom Hearts Re:coded | Square Enix, h.a.n.d. | 2010 | Nintendo DS |
| Kingdom Hearts 3D: Dream Drop Distance | Square Enix | 2012 | Nintendo 3DS |
| Kingdom Hearts HD 1.5 Remix | Square Enix | 2013 | PlayStation 3, PlayStation 4, Xbox One, Windows, Nintendo Switch |
| Kingdom Hearts χ | Square Enix, Success, BitGroove | 2013 | Web browser, Android, iOS, Fire OS |
| Kingdom Hearts HD 2.5 Remix | Square Enix | 2014 | PlayStation 3, PlayStation 4, Xbox One, Windows, Nintendo Switch |
| Kingdom Hearts HD 2.8 Final Chapter Prologue | Square Enix | 2017 | PlayStation 4, Xbox One, Windows, Nintendo Switch |
| Kingdom Hearts III | Square Enix | 2019 | PlayStation 4, Xbox One, Windows, Nintendo Switch |
| Kingdom Hearts Dark Road | Square Enix, Success, BitGroove | 2020 | Android, iOS |
| Kingdom Hearts: Melody of Memory | Square Enix, indieszero | 2020 | PlayStation 4, Xbox One, Windows, Nintendo Switch |
| Kingdom Hearts IV | Square Enix | 2027 | PlayStation 5, Xbox Series X/S, Windows, Nintendo Switch 2 |

=== Spectrobes games ===
The following games are from the Spectrobes series. It was Disney's first major original video game IP that is not based on a pre-existing film or TV franchise.

| Main title / alternate title(s) | Developer | Release date | System(s) |
|---|---|---|---|
| Spectrobes | Jupiter | 2007 | Nintendo DS |
| Spectrobes: Beyond the Portals | Jupiter | 2008 | Nintendo DS |
| Spectrobes: Origins | Genki | 2009 | Wii |

=== other games ===
- Disney's Print Studio
- Disney Twisted-Wonderland
