= The Disney Afternoon =

Programming block

- Logo used from 1990–1994; 1996–1997
- Network: Syndication
- Launched: September 10, 1990
- Closed: August 30, 1999
- Country of origin: United States
- Owner: Buena Vista Television
- Formerly known as: The Disney Afternoon (1990–1997)
- Sister network: Disney's One Saturday Morning; Disney's One Too
- Format: Weekday animated series
- Running time: 2 hours (1990–1997); 90 minutes (1997–1999)

The Disney Afternoon (later known internally as the Disney-Kellogg Alliance when unbranded from 1997–1999), sometimes abbreviated as TDA, was a created-for-syndication two-hour programming block of animated television series. It was produced by Walt Disney Television Animation and distributed through its syndication affiliate Buena Vista Television. Each show from the block has aired reruns on Disney Channel and Toon Disney. Disney Channel reaired four shows (Darkwing Duck, TaleSpin, DuckTales, and Chip 'n Dale: Rescue Rangers) on "Block Party," a two-hour block that aired on weekdays in the late afternoon/early evening.

The Disney Afternoon's block had four half-hour segments, each of which contained an animated series. As each season ended, the lineup would shift - the remaining three would move up a time slot and a new show would be added to the end. The Disney Afternoon itself featured unique animated segments consisting of its opening and "wrappers" around the cartoon shows.

The Disney Afternoon originally ran from September 10, 1990, to August 29, 1997 as The Disney afternoon. For the 1997-1999 television seasons, it lost its name but was known internally as Disney-Kellogg Alliance, and shortened to 90 minutes. This version was followed by its gradual replacement by Disney's One Too for UPN in 1999. Some of the shows also aired on Saturday mornings on ABC and CBS, concurrently with their original syndicated runs on The Disney Afternoon.

Goof Troop is the only show to reach the 2000s, with the 2000 direct-to-video finale An Extremely Goofy Movie. The 2010s and 2020s saw revivals of some shows such as DuckTales as a reboot on Disney Channel (and Disney XD), and Chip 'n Dale: Rescue Rangers with a live-action animation hybrid film on Disney+. In November 2020, a Darkwing Duck reboot was announced to be in development for Disney+ with the project being greenlit in September 2026. In 2023, a reboot for TaleSpin and a live-action series for Gargoyles were reported to be in development for Disney+; the latter was cancelled. In August 2026, Bret Spiner hinted that a new Gargoyles animated series was in development at Disney Television Animation and Disney Kids & Family.

== Background ==
The Disney Afternoon goes back to Michael Eisner becoming Disney's CEO in 1984 and his push into steady animated television production, which would be based on new characters to bring in new young fans, with a newly launched TV animation department. He set up a Sunday meeting at his house consisting of creatives. They included Tad Stones from feature animation and Jymn Magon and Gary Kriesel from the music division. Mickey and the Space Pirates was pitched by Stones, but was turned down because Mickey Mouse is the company symbol. Stones also pitched a Rescuers TV series – the sequel was already under development at the time. Eisner suggested the Gummy bear as a series, given his kids liked the candy. Disney Television Animation's first two shows, The Wuzzles and Adventures of the Gummi Bears, were sold to two networks, CBS and NBC, respectively, for their Saturday morning cartoon blocks.

== History ==
=== The Disney Afternoon ===
DuckTales, the series which would serve as the launching pad for what would become The Disney Afternoon, premiered in first-run syndication in the fall of 1987. Two years later in the fall of 1989, DuckTales was joined by Chip 'n Dale: Rescue Rangers, and both series were being offered in syndication as an hour-long program block. The Disney Afternoon kept these shows, added Gummi Bears and TaleSpin, and premiered on September 10, 1990, via Disney's syndication arm Buena Vista Television.

DuckTales had been airing on many affiliates of the then-young Fox network and its group of owned-and-operated stations, including KTTV in Los Angeles; this may have been due to the fact that the Walt Disney Company's chief operating officer at the time, Michael Eisner, and his then-Fox counterpart, Barry Diller, had worked together previously at ABC and at Paramount Pictures. However, as Chip 'n Dale was being launched, Disney was in the process of purchasing Los Angeles independent station KHJ-TV from RKO General. Through Buena Vista Television, Disney opted to reclaim the Los Angeles broadcast rights for DuckTales and moved it from KTTV to be paired with Chip 'n Dale on its newly purchased station, which was renamed KCAL-TV in December 1989. Furious at the breach of contract, Diller pulled DuckTales from all of Fox's other owned-and-operated stations in the fall of 1989. Diller also encouraged the network's affiliates to do the same, though most did not initially. This caused the retaliatory formation of Fox Kids. (Ironically, most of the assets of Fox Kids would be bought by Disney in 2001 via their acquisition of Fox Family Worldwide.)

As the years went on, new shows would be added at the end of the block, with the oldest shows being dropped from the lineup. The 1991–92 season, for instance, saw Gummi Bears' removal, and Darkwing Duck being added to the end. After DuckTales, Chip 'n Dale, and TaleSpin were removed from The Disney Afternoon, they continued to rerun in syndication separately from the block until 1995.

By the fifth season in 1994, the block had removed its original four shows and undergone a makeover, with the primary branding being the block's initials, TDA. At this point, the original idea of shows being added and removed yearly was dropped, as both new and old shows were now stripped all week, or only aired on certain days. The lineup at this point included Aladdin, Goof Troop and Darkwing Duck stripped, while one daily slot was split between The Shnookums and Meat Funny Cartoon Show and Gargoyles, book-ending three days a week of Bonkers.

Disney Channel developed a similar programming block called "Block Party", which premiered on October 2, 1995 (airing concurrently with TDA's sixth season) and was similarly scheduled and stripped with the early Disney Afternoon series of Darkwing Duck, TaleSpin, DuckTales, and Chip 'n Dale: Rescue Rangers.

=== Disney-Kellogg's Alliance ===
By August 1996, owing to decreasing business in the syndicated children's television market due to new competitors such as the cable networks Cartoon Network and Nickelodeon, and the new networks The WB and UPN with having children's blocks of their own, Buena Vista agreed with the Leo Burnett agency to market and distribute a revamped version of the block for the 1997–98 and 1998–99 television seasons. Buena Vista established a partnership with Leo Burnett and Kellogg's—who had been a major sponsor of The Disney Afternoon—to purchase an amount of dedicated advertising inventory. The new block did not carry any blanket branding, but was referred to internally as the "Disney-Kellogg Alliance."

With the September 1, 1997, season started, the block dropped The Disney Afternoon name, a half-hour from the stripped block and the Gargoyles series. Moving to the Disney Channel were Disney's Aladdin and The Lion King's Timon & Pumbaa. 101 Dalmatians, which was shared with ABC's Disney's One Saturday Morning (which broadcast their own set of episodes), premiered on the block. Mighty Ducks and Quack Pack reruns shared the second slot in a Monday, Tuesday, and Wednesdays through Fridays, split respectively. DuckTales repeats filled the third half-hour slot, with flexibility for the local station to air it at other times.

In 1998, Disney reached a deal to program a new children's block for UPN, Disney's One Too, as a replacement for that network's internal UPN Kids block. The syndicated block ran until the debut of One Too on September 6, 1999.

== International broadcasts ==
In Edmonton, Alberta, Canada, the city's then-independent TV station ITV (now Global Edmonton) produced its own version of The Disney Afternoon over roughly the same period as the American block, but only once per week in a two-hour block on Saturday afternoons, though using the same cartoon lineup as the American weekday block. Apart from the animated introduction, the block did not use any Disney-produced wrapper segments, but instead used locally produced live-action segments between programs with host Mike Sobel.

In Denmark, DR1 started its version of the block ("Disney Sjov") on October 25, 1991. It aired every Friday night and would consist of two half-hour shows along with two classic cartoons, all within one commercial-free hour. The block ended on December 30, 2022, in favor of locally produced Nordic children's programming.

In Hungary, MTV1 offered a Sunday afternoon programming block for children of programming from The Walt Disney Company dubbed into Hungarian, titled Walt Disney bemutatja (Walt Disney presents). The block, launched in 1991, garnered a domestic audience of two and a half million viewers. This programming lasted up until 1998.

== Programming ==
Over the years, the block featured the following shows: Here is also a scheduled for The Disney Afternoon

Title	Block run	Time slot	Weekdays
The Disney Afternoon
Adventures of the Gummi Bears	1990–91 (Note: Aired episodes before joining the block)	3:00 p.m.	Monday-Friday
DuckTales (1987)	1990–99 (Note: Aired under the Disney-Kellogg Alliance)	3:30 p.m. (1990-91); 3:00 p.m. (1991-92)	Monday-Friday
Chip 'n Dale: Rescue Rangers	1990–93	4:00 p.m. (1990-91); 3:30 p.m. (1991-92); 3:00 p.m. (1992-93)	Monday-Friday
TaleSpin	1990–94	4:30 p.m. (1990-91); 4:00 p.m. (1991-92); 3:30 p.m. (1992-93); 3:00 p.m. (1993-94)	Monday-Friday
Darkwing Duck	1991–97	4:30 p.m. (1991-92); 4:00 p.m. (1992-93); 3:30 p.m. (1993-94); 3:00 p.m. (1994-95, 1996-97)	Monday-Friday
Goof Troop	1992–96	4:30 p.m. (1992-93); 4:00 p.m. (1993-94); 3:30 p.m. (1994-95); 3:00 p.m. (1995-96)	Monday-Friday
Bonkers	1993–96	4:30 p.m. (1993-94); 4:00 p.m. (1994-95); 3:30 p.m. (1995-96)	Monday-Friday (1993-94, 1995-96); Monday-Thursday (1994); Tuesday-Thursday (1995)
Aladdin	1994–97	4:30 p.m. (1994-95); 4:00 p.m. (1995-96); 3:30 p.m. (1996-97)	Monday-Friday
Gargoyles	1994–97	4:00 p.m. (1994-95, 1996-97); 4:30 p.m. (1995-96)	Friday (1994-95); Monday-Thursday (1995-96); Monday-Friday (1996-97)
The Shnookums & Meat Funny Cartoon Show	1995	4:00 p.m.	Monday
The Lion King's Timon & Pumbaa	1995–97	4:30 p.m.	Friday (1995-96); Monday (1996-97)
Quack Pack	1996–98	4:30 p.m.	Tuesday-Thursday
Mighty Ducks: The Animated Series	1996–98	4:30 p.m.	Friday
Disney-Kellogg Alliance
101 Dalmatians	1997–98		
Hercules	1998–99		
Doug	1998–99		

== Adaptations ==
=== Comic books ===
The block was adapted into comic books, films and launched the Disney Adventures magazine.

=== Disney parks ===
Characters from the shows first appeared in Disney parks with the debut of Mickey's Birthdayland in the Magic Kingdom, Walt Disney World. In 1990, the characters got a daily show, "Mickey's Magical TV World", which lasted until 1996.

The popularity of The Disney Afternoon led to a temporary attraction at Disneyland in Fantasyland called "Disney Afternoon Avenue." Disney Afternoon Avenue was a feature of Disneyland from March 15 to November 10, 1991. Two attractions were also made over to match series from the block.

=== Video games ===
Many of The Disney Afternoon shows were adapted into video games.

Main title/alternate title	Developer	Publisher	Regions released	Release date	Players	Console(s)
DuckTales	Capcom		JP, NA, EU	September 14, 1989	1	NES, Game Boy
Chip 'n Dale Rescue Rangers	Capcom		JP, NA, EU	June 8, 1990	2	NES
Chip 'n Dale Rescue Rangers	Tiger Electronics		NA	1990	1	Handheld electronic game
DuckTales: The Quest for Gold	Incredible Technologies, Sierra On-Line	Walt Disney Computer Software	NA	December 31, 1990	1	Amiga, Apple II, C64, MS-DOS, Windows, Mac OS 8
DuckTales	Tiger Electronics		NA	1990	1	Handheld electronic game
Chip 'n Dale Rescue Rangers: The Adventures in Nimnul's Castle	Hi Tech Expressions	Walt Disney Computer Software	NA	March 1, 1990	1	IBM PC
TaleSpin	Tiger Electronics		NA	1990	1	Handheld electronic game
TaleSpin	Capcom		NA, EU	December 1991	1	NES, Game Boy
TaleSpin	NEC		NA, EU	1991	1	TurboGrafx-16
TaleSpin	Sega		NA, EU	1992	1	Genesis, Game Gear
Darkwing Duck	Capcom		NA, EU	June 1992	1	NES, Game Boy
Darkwing Duck	Turbo Technologies		NA	1992	1	TG16
Darkwing Duck	Tiger Electronics		NA	1992	1	Handheld electronic game
DuckTales 2	Capcom		JP, NA, EU	April 23, 1993	1	NES, Game Boy
Goof Troop	Capcom		JP, NA, EU	July 11, 1993	2	SNES
Goof Troop	Tiger Electronics		NA	1993	1	Handheld electronic game
Chip 'n Dale Rescue Rangers 2	Capcom		JP, NA, EU	1993	2	NES
Bonkers	Capcom		JP, NA, EU	December 15, 1994	1	SNES
Bonkers	Sega		NA, EU	October 1, 1994	1	Genesis
Bonkers: Wax Up!	Sega		BR	February 4, 1995	1	Game Gear, Master System
Gargoyles	Buena Vista Interactive	Disney Interactive	NA	May 15, 1995	1	Genesis
Gargoyles	Tiger Electronics		NA	1995	1	Handheld electronic game
Mighty Ducks	Tiger Electronics		NA	1996	1	Handheld electronic game
Mighty Ducks Pinball Slam	Walt Disney Company		NA	1998	1	Arcade
Chip 'n Dale Rescue Rangers	Dinamic Pixels		NA	2010	1	Mobile Phone
Darkwing Duck	Iricom		NA	2010	1	Mobile Phone
DuckTales: Scrooge's Loot	Disney Mobile	Disney Interactive	NA	July 26, 2013	1	iOS, Android
DuckTales: Remastered	Capcom, WayForward Technologies	Capcom, Disney Interactive	JP, NA, EU	August 13, 2013	1	Wii U, PlayStation 3, Xbox 360, Windows, iOS, Android
The Disney Afternoon Collection	Capcom, Digital Eclipse	Capcom	NA, EU	April 18, 2017	2	PS4, Xbox One, Windows
Gargoyles Remastered	Empty Clip Studios	Disney Games	NA, EU	October 19, 2023	1	PS4, Xbox One, Windows, Xbox Series X and Series S, Switch

== See also ==
- List of programs broadcast by Disney Channel
- Disney XD
  - ABC Kids
  - Toon Disney
  - Jetix
- Nicktoons - a brand for Nickelodeon animated series
- Cartoon Cartoons - a collective brand used for Cartoon Network
