= List of Bonkers episodes =

The following is an episode list of Bonkers, an American animated television series that first aired from September 4, 1993, to February 23, 1994, and then continued airing as reruns until 1995 on The Disney Afternoon (with select episodes airing on The Disney Channel from February to June 1993 as a preview for the series). The series was set in a Roger Rabbit-like world where "toons" and humans co-exist.

The premise of the series was that Bonkers D. Bobcat, an anthropomorphic bobcat who was a popular cartoon star (he appeared in "He's Bonkers" shorts in the fictional world of Bonkers as well) had washed out of show business and became a cop. He was made the junior partner of Detective Lucky Piquel, a grim and ill-tempered human who hates toons. Throughout the series, the pair work together to solve crimes in the Hollywood, Los Angeles, California region. Bonkers repeatedly tried to win Piquel's praise, but usually just ended up ruining missions with his antics.

After some years of working with Bonkers, Piquel was given an FBI job in Washington, D.C., and with great glee was finally able to leave Bonkers, but finally realized that after all the time spent hating working with Bonkers, he had grown to love him. At the end of the "Lucky" episodes, Bonkers was given a new partner, the attractive Sergeant Miranda Wright. Although also human, she was far more patient and tolerant of his antics than was Piquel. With Miranda, Bonkers was more the brunt of the slapstick.

== Broadcast chronology ==
Bonkers' 65 episodes all aired on The Disney Afternoon during the 1993–94 television season. Nine episodes aired in The Disney Channel from February to June 1993 as a preview for the series and they aired in October 1993 in the original syndication. However, the series can be broken up into multiple groups or subseasons of episodes, based on when they originally aired and from which set of episodes they came (i.e., the Lucky Piquel episodes, the Miranda Wright episodes, or the compilation episodes).

The syndicated run of the show began with a special hour-long airing of the Lucky Piquel pilot story ("Going Bonkers"/"Gone Bonkers"), that aired the weekend before the series' Disney Afternoon premiere. This first episode was later split into two parts, which are treated as separate episodes. Nineteen more Lucky episodes subsequently premiered in September and October 1993. These 21 episodes are referred to here as "Group 1".

In October 1993, the 19 Miranda Wright episodes aired on The Disney Afternoon, preceded by a special crossover episode, "New Partners on the Block," which tied the previously produced Miranda episodes into the continuity of the Lucky Piquel episodes. Along with the 9 Miranda episodes previously shown on The Disney Channel, 10 more Miranda episodes made their debut. The 19 Miranda episodes, along with "New Partners on the Block," are referred to here as "Group 2".

In November 1993, 20 more Lucky Piquel episodes began airing on The Disney Afternoon. They were proceeded by a TV promo which states that they are new episodes that were never seen before even though actually they were produced in the same time with the first 22 "Lucky" episodes. Fifteen of them premiered in November, with the last 5 being held over until February 1994 (most likely to coincide with the February ratings sweeps). The last 20 Lucky episodes are included in the "Group 1" (first season).

In addition, four extra special compilation episodes, featuring the Bonkers shorts from He's Bonkers and 4 new segments were interspersed among the other episodes. 9 of the 12 old shorts received new titlecards while the other 3 kept their original intros. The Rubber Room Song segment originally belongs to the previously produced and the later aired episode "CasaBonkers". These compilation episodes are listed separately.

When the series went into reruns, the Lucky Piquel and Miranda Wright episodes were usually rerun separately (i.e., all of the Lucky episodes, then all of the Miranda episodes, then the Lucky episodes again, etc.), even if the episodes were rerun out of order (the compilation episodes would be rerun with the Lucky episodes, then all the Miranda episodes aired last again).

Each episode was given a production code by Walt Disney Television Animation. These codes are in the format "4311-xxx"; the Miranda episodes are numbered "4311-0xx", while the Lucky episodes (along with "New Partners on the Block" and the compilation episodes) are numbered "4311-1xx." The Miranda episodes' production numbers are not consecutive; several numbers are skipped over. The production codes have been sourced from the individual episode registration records in the U.S. Copyright Office catalog (since not all of these episode records have a listed production code, and because of the skips in the Miranda episode numbering, the codes for "The Stork Exchange" and "Toon for a Day" are not known).

In addition, Disney's distribution arm Buena Vista Television used a different numbering system, with all of the Lucky Piquel episodes in production code order, followed by "New Partners on the Block", then all of the Miranda Wright episodes in production code order, (Note: This is the official chronological order of the series.) with the four compilation episodes randomly interspersed among the Lucky episodes (except for "If", which is placed between "New Partners on the Block" and the rest of the Miranda episodes). BVTV's episode codes carry the prefix "BK-xx". This numbering was also the order generally used when the series was broadcast outside of North America, except with "Going Bonkers" and "Gone Bonkers" moved to the beginning of the order. The resultant "international" order (excluding the compilation episodes) perhaps most closely reflects the series' in-universe chronology.

== Series overview ==
Groups	Episodes	Originally released	
Groups	Episodes	First released	Last released
1	41	September 4, 1993	February 23, 1994
Compilations		September 30, 1993	November 24, 1993
2	20	February 28, 1993	October 29, 1993

== Episodes ==
=== Group 1 (1993–94) ===
Notes: (Note: In the official chronological BK order, groups 1 and "3" of Lucky episodes were mixed, ended with "New Partners on the Block" and then were followed by groups 2 and "4", the rest of the Miranda episodes.) (Note: Besides the numbers shown by the BK order, "Going Bonkers" aired the first, "Gone Bonkers" aired the second and "In the Bag" aired the third in almost all countries.)

No. overall	No. in season	Title	Original release date	Prod. code	BK No.
1	1	"Going Bonkers (Part 1)"	September 4, 1993	4311-124	BK-24
W.W. Wacky cancels Bonkers and his friends' show production. Bonkers joins the Hollywood Police with a partner, Lucky Piquel on a case for missing Toons, snatched by a criminal called "The Collector". NOTE 1: Donald Duck (in his DuckTales attire) makes a cameo appearance. NOTE 2: In one moment, there's a small sequence of the first He's Bonkers short Petal to the Metal, which Bonkers is performing in his studio.
2	2	"Gone Bonkers (Part 2)"	September 4, 1993	4311-136	BK-36
Bonkers gets captured by Doodles during his search for Fallapart. Toots leads Piquel to the Collector's hideout, saving Bonkers. The Collector is revealed to be a human before he gets trapped in the prop box.
3	3	"In the Bag"	September 6, 1993	4311-101	BK-01
Bonkers and Piquel investigate the Hatter's house where items are being stolen. The thieving Toon Handbag gives the duo a hard time, but he eventually reveals his true colours and gives back what he took.
4	4	"Hear No Bonkers, See No Bonkers"	September 7, 1993	4311-104	BK-04
Bonkers gets Piquel fired and he and Onnie vanish from a toon invisibility substance disguised as bath foam. Piquel and Bonkers tail the crooks that advertised the substance and Piquel gets his job back.
5	5	"Out of Sight, Out of Toon"	September 8, 1993	4311-108	BK-08
In search of the minuscule toon Maggie, Piquel catches Toon Flu. Bonkers and Fallapart try to cure Piquel before he completely becomes a toon, while Piquel stumbles upon Maggie in the sewers and finds the flu wasn't serious after all.
6	6	"Is Toon Fur Really Warm?"	September 9, 1993	4311-102	BK-02
Piquel requests Bonkers to invite Skunky Skunk to Marilyn's birthday, but finds he has disappeared after being accused of manslaughter. The Toon Squad track Skunky and eventually catch the culprits, Seymour Chumski and Jed McScam.
7	7	"Calling All Cars"	September 10, 1993	4311-105	BK-05
Toon tow truck Ma Parker gets into Piquel's confidence to steal car parts from the police garage assisted by Wooly and Bully. Bonkers reveals Ma Parker's intentions to Piquel and the duo stop the criminals at the monster truck competition.
8	8	"Fall Apart Bomb Squad"	September 13, 1993	4311-107	BK-07
A crazy Toon Bomb who wants to be a stand-up comic terrorizes the city, and Piquel and Bonkers take the case with their new explosives expert, Fall-Apart Rabbit.
9	9	"In Toons We Trust"	September 14, 1993	4311-114	BK-14
Piquel arrests Baby Hubert at a robbery scene, while Bonkers assumes he is innocent, but Diamond Bill makes matters worse for both Bonkers and Hubert. Piquel and Bonkers chase Diamond Bill and clear Hubert's name.
10	10	"Never Cry Pig"	September 15, 1993	4311-129	BK-29
Piquel and Bonkers are beckoned by the Three Big Pigs to catch the Mean Old Wolf, which they pin for their own damages. Bonkers breaks the wolf out prison and they arrive at Porkwood managing to uncover the pigs' scam plan.
11	11	"Hamster Houseguest"	September 16, 1993	4311-110	BK-10
A big toon hamster called Tiny has a stayover at Piquel's house. He's actually hiding from the Mysterious Shadow, revealed to be his old friend Mr. Big. Their lack of experience in the real world makes it hard to get a new job.
12	12	"The Cheap Sheep Sweep"	September 17, 1993	4311-103	BK-03
Bonkers and Piquel go on a case for stolen items and missing toons. A sneaky wolf who is behind this abducts Bonkers. Piquel goes undercover in the sheep factory to save Bonkers and the two put the wolf in sheep's clothing.
13	13	"The Day the Toon Stood Still"	September 20, 1993	4311-117	BK-17
Toons everywhere have gone out of control. Fall Apart takes Piquel and Bonkers to Pops Clock, who is causing havoc due to feeling taken for granted by the toons. Fall Apart manages to renew Pops' faith with a 'thank you', prompting him to fix the damage.
14	14	"Weather or Not"	September 21, 1993	4311-121	BK-21
Piquel gets annoyed from the repeated misleading weather forecasts caused by the absence of the weather toons: Sunny, Cloudy, Snowy, Sparky, and Toony Tornado. Bonkers eventually reveals the disappearance was staged by the weather toons themselves and he traps them in a weather map.
15	15	"Basic Spraining"	September 22, 1993	4311-109	BK-09
Having failed to catch the mastermind criminal Slippery McSlime, Piquel sends Bonkers to police academy, a trap set up specially by McSlime to dispose of the duo. Using toon tricks, Bonkers outsmarts and busts McSlime.
16	16	"Once in a Blue Toon"	September 23, 1993	4311-113	BK-13
Piquel and Bonkers have been chosen for a toon reforming program starting with a toon that eats everything in sight called Louse. The program does not go well with Louse, but Piquel's anger prompts him into behaving.
17	17	"Luna-Toons"	September 24, 1993	4311-116	BK-16
An alien called Cadet Quark sets off to conquer the earth. Bonkers makes friends with Quark, while Piquel is seeking a thief (Crab Nebula). Quark helps Piquel catch Crab Nebula and asks his superiors to allow him to stay on earth.
18	18	"Time Wounds All Heels"	September 27, 1993	4311-131	BK-31
Convicted Max Coody a man sentenced 20 years ago is released from prison and wants to get even with Piquel. Piquel frantically tries to protect himself. Rather than exact revenge on Piquel, Max is filled with gratitude for helping him reform.
19	19	"Poltertoon"	September 28, 1993	4311-132	BK-32
A ghost wreaks havoc in the Piquel household, just on the day the Kanifkys invite themselves over for dinner.
20	20	"Hand Over the Dough"	September 29, 1993	4311-123	BK-23
Piquel and Bonkers investigate explosions of Butterman Bakery's service. Mikey Muffin is revealed to be the bomber in order to take over Butterman's business. Piquel and Bonkers halt Mikey's plan and turn Mikey into a biscuit.
21	21	"Tune Pig"	October 1, 1993	4311-106	BK-06
Piquel takes Dilandra for their anniversary to the Julio Calamari Concert. The untalented Julio is forcing Charlie Pig to sing his songs. Bonkers rescues Charlie's mother from Old Mac's petting zoo while Piquel disrupts Julio at dinner.
22	22	"The Good, the Bad, & the Kanifky"	November 1, 1993	4311-127	BK-27
After an accident, the mayor reassigns Chief Kanifky with the Toon Squad. Kanifky is put out of commission after many debts in the case of Scatter Squirrel. Together Kanifky, Bonkers and Piquel pursue and arrest Scatter. NOTE: Goofy and Max make cameo appearances in one moment.
23	23	"I Oughta Be in Toons"	November 2, 1993	4311-111	BK-11
Bonkers and Piquel go to investigate the disappearance of Mickey Mouse. Amateur imposter Babyface, a former child star, is replacing Mickey in addition to a bulldog as Pluto. With the bulldog's help, our heroes catch the imposter. NOTE: There's a statue of Goofy between the different stuffs of the van where Bonkers and Lucky enter.
24	24	"Frame That Toon"	November 3, 1993	4311-137	BK-37
While Piquel and Bonkers investigate multiple thefts, toon saxophone Alto tries to find his older brother Mac the Bass. However cowardly Mac assists Mr. Malone and his large toon ape accomplice with their thefts. Bonkers, Piquel and Alto get trapped by Malone and the ape, but Mac helps Bonkers arrest the thieves.
25	25	"A Wooly Bully"	November 4, 1993	4311-120	BK-20
Having lost his acting career, Mammoth Mammoth resorts to criminal activities. Bonkers and Piquel find the mammoth in the peanut butter factory and go after him at the toon studio. After a series of amateur attempts, Bonkers arrests the mammoth.
26	26	"Stay Tooned"	November 5, 1993	4311-122	BK-22
Piquel comes across mobster Flannigan's logbook. Bonkers who is strictly not to touch it, loses it to Toots, causing major problems for Piquel, Kanifky and Fall Apart. Flannigan interrogates Bonkers for his logbook, but Piquel comes to the rescue.
27	27	"Color Me Piquel"	November 11, 1993	4311-112	BK-12
Piquel and Bonkers investigate missing toons, a toon bowler hat as the only lead. Bonkers gets taken where all the other toons are held for their colours by two malicious (and therefore, faded) toons. Piquel goes disguised as a toon with Fall Apart and rescues Bonkers and the other toons from their captors.
28	28	"Stand-In Dad"	November 12, 1993	4311-128	BK-28
On Grampa Arnie's Ant show an evil executive is swiping audience's pocket cash with a vacuum. Kanifky sends Piquel undercover to host the show taking Marilyn to spend some quality time with her. Bonkers invites Marilyn to the show getting her snatched by the executive, but Piquel and Bonkers rescue her and arrest the executive.
29	29	"Cereal Surreal"	November 15, 1993	4311-130	BK-30
Bonkers and Piquel investigate missing cereal box prizes. The temporate mascots of Wheat Crunchies Turbo, Banshee and Kapow are the culprits and set up Slap, Sniffle and Flop, but Bonkers and Piquel arrive to stop them and save the CEO. NOTE: Slap, Sniffle and Flop are a parody of Snap, Crackle and Pop from the cereal, Rice Krispies.
30	30	"The Dimming"	November 17, 1993	4311-125	BK-25
Piquel takes a vacation to a "Haunted Mountain Resort" to pursue his dream of becoming a horror writer. Bonkers sends Fall-Apart and the grapevine to scare him, but then a ghost shows up.
31	31	"Toon with No Name"	November 18, 1993	4311-135	BK-35
Piquel and Bonkers are in pursuit of a masked bandit and every encounter mirrors a wild western cartoon Bonkers once starred in, until they find out that the bandit is none other than the screen writer Oswald.
32	32	"Get Wacky"	November 19, 1993	4311-141	BK-41
Bonkers and Piquel are assigned to catch escaped convict Wacky Weasel. The Toon Squad fails to nail him at the supermarket, the museum and the Fabergé egg exhibit, but Bonkers outsmarts the weasel at the Wacky Studio.
33	33	"The Final Review"	November 22, 1993	4311-115	BK-15
Bonkers and Piquel are assigned to protect the TV critic Charles Quibble (who shuns Bonkers). The perpetrator is revealed to be television show cop TJ Finger who kidnaps Quibble for his last review, but Piquel arrests him and Bonkers saves Quibble.
34	34	"Seems Like Old Toons"	November 26, 1993	4311-138	BK-38
Two bees and a bear are in need of animator to finish their cartoon before the studio is demolished. Marilyn receives their request and heads to the studio and volunteers to finish their work. Piquel and Bonkers help finish the cartoon moments before the studio is demolished.
35	35	"Miracle at the 34th Precinct"	November 27, 1993	4311-144	BK-44
With Father Christmas missing in blizzard over California, two of his little helpers recruit Piquel to take his place until he can be found. While Piquel struggles to do his job, Fall Apart socialises with the real Father Christmas.
36	36	"Comeback Kid"	November 29, 1993	4311-143	BK-43
Two confidence tricksters, Chick and Stu trick Bonkers and Piquel into becoming actors to get the opportunity to steal a large diamond on its way to a museum. They manage to swipe the diamond, but Bonkers and Fall Apart thwart their heist.
37	37	"The Greatest Story Never Told"	February 7, 1994	4311-133	BK-33
Bonkers hires toon camera Zoom and microphone Boom to make Piquel appear suitable for Cop of the Year. Zoom and Boom ruin Piquel's reputation making him look like both a clown and a mugger's partner. With Bonker's help, Piquel clears his name.
38	38	"Fall Apart Land"	February 9, 1994	4311-119	BK-19
Hoping to help an overworked Piquel, Fall-Apart buys a dump from a crooked owner Seymour Sleezebottom to build their dream theme park. Seymour takes over the theme park, but is arrested for illegal activity.
39	39	"Imagine That"	February 14, 1994	4311-126	BK-26
Piquel and Bonkers are sent to investigate graffiti committed by a toon pencil. The pencil impersonates Scribble and goes with Marilyn to the toon world. While Bonkers and Piquel pick up the trail, Marilyn helps the pencil turn over a new leaf.
40	40	"A Fine Kettle of Toons"	February 17, 1994	4311-142	BK-42
Piquel secretly plans a surprise party for the Chief Kanifky for his 40th. anniversary on the force. But Kanifky wants to know what he's up to, so he teams up with Fall-Apart to spy on Bonkers and Piquel.
41	41	"Stressed to Kill"	February 23, 1994	4311-139	BK-39
Piquel is having a nervous breakdown being unable to nab the mole thief, who is stealing works of priceless art and he is haunted by the sight of him. Failed attempts at curing Piquel's stress, turn him into an ape until he accidentally lands on the mole. NOTE 1: Ludwig Von Drake makes a cameo appearance. NOTE 2: This episode is considered an alternative series finale of the series, especially in the Italian edition, as in the original, and often focuses on Lucky Piquel who, by the end of the series, will improve his liking for toons.

=== Group 2 (1993) ===
No. overall	No. in season	Title	Original release date	Prod. code	BK No.
42	1	"New Partners on the Block"	October 4, 1993	4311-145	BK-45
Piquel tries go on a case for Fireball Frank solo, and is seemingly killed, but is actually captured with Agent Talson by Frank. Together Officer Miranda and Bonkers rescue the two and arrest Frank. Bonker's partnership with Piquel is switched with Miranda.
43	2	"Witless for the Prosecution"	October 5, 1993	4311-002	BK-48
Miranda can testify against publisher Lillith DuPrave at her counterfeiting trial. So, she hides out in Bonkers's house until the trial. So, Bonkers and his friends decide to annoy her by smothering her with attention.
44	3	"Bobcat Fever"	October 6, 1993; Disney Channel preview: March 21, 1993	4311-028	BK-65
Al Vermin tricks Cheryl Germ (a toon microbe and an actress) into infecting Bonkers, while she thinks that it is just her role in a new movie. Miranda and Professor Ludwig Von Drake have to stop Cheryl before she causes irreversible damage to Bonkers' brain.
45	4	"What You Read Is What You Get"	October 7, 1993; Disney Channel preview: April 25, 1993	4311-020	BK-61
Bonkers constantly reads the papers when what he reads happen. At the National Trash the boss, Lilith Duprave, and her typewriter Hilde abduct Bonkers. Hilde turns against her boss when she realises what she types are lies. Bonkers wakes up to find all this never happened.
46	5	"Do Toons Dream of Animated Sheep?"	October 8, 1993	4311-016	BK-59
Tired of being a part of Bonkers dreams, the toon sheep Baa-bara invades the dreams to make them her own, draining Bonkers health. With the help of Dr. Ludwig Von Drake, Bonkers manages to exchange good dreams for Baa-bara in return for ceasing her invasion. NOTE: Darkwing Duck makes a cameo appearance. NOTE: As in the parody of the Darkwing Duck series: Ghoul of My Dreams.
47	6	"Trains, Toons, and Toon Trains"	October 11, 1993; Disney Channel preview: February 28, 1993	4311-006	BK-51
Miranda and Bonkers are sent to escort a criminal, Stiff Lips Sullivan on a train, who knows the location of a stolen jewel cache. A mob couple is also interested in the jewels, but Bonkers eventually misleads them to the police station.
48	7	"Quibbling Rivalry"	October 12, 1993	4311-012	BK-57
After Miranda catches a cat burglar, her TV reporter sister Shirley arrives. In broadcasts, Shirley films Bonkers in troubled situations, making him look like a menace to society. Miranda gets a good scoop after Bonkers saves an old lady and her cat from a building on fire.
49	8	"The Toon That Ate Hollywood"	October 13, 1993; Disney Channel preview: April 4, 1993	4311-010	BK-55
A lame clown named Gloomy, and his toon frog sidekick, Giggles steals Dr. Ludwig Von Drake's Humoriser and drains toons' sense of humor. Miranda and Bonkers follow the trail and the clown overloads the humoriser causing his frog partner to mutate into a humor monster. Miranda beats the monster with a round of gags.
50	9	"Springtime for the Iguana"	October 14, 1993	4311-009	BK-54
Bonkers takes Roderick Lizard to star at the studio. Crunchy sets Roderick up for arson in order to get the part for himself. Bonkers has a hard time getting answers, while Roderick bails himself out of prison. Together they chase and pin down Crunchy.
51	10	"CasaBonkers"	October 15, 1993	4311-021	BK-62
In a restaurant Bonkers recalls an interest for Catcha. As Al Vermin bursts in, Catcha entrusts a package to Bonkers. The package is revealed to contain the Circle Beenie. Al Vermin, Catcha, Miranda and Flaps all try to get it from Bonkers until the original owners come to reclaim it. NOTE: Lady and Tramp from Lady and the Tramp and Brer Bear from Song of the South, make cameo appearances
52	11	"Tokyo Bonkers"	October 18, 1993; Disney Channel preview: March 7, 1993	4311-008	BK-53
Miranda and Bonkers are delivering Z-Bot to the Tokyo Police HQ, but Bonkers loses him to Z-Bot's minions, the Ninja Kitties. Miranda and the Tokyo Inspector track Z-Bot only to be apprehended. Bonkers comes to the rescue and traps Z-Bot.
53	12	"Love Stuck"	October 19, 1993	4311-001	BK-47
Bonkers and Miranda investigate disappearing bachelors on the "Love Corral" TV show. Envious Winston Prickly kidnaps the latest Bachelor. Bonkers goes undercover in the game show and loses Rita. Bonkers tails Winston all the way to an amusement park.
54	13	"When the Spirit Moves You"	October 20, 1993; Disney Channel preview: April 11, 1993	4311-025	BK-64
Bonkers and Miranda get a ghost to leave the building that it is haunting but now it is haunting the police station. Can they get the ghost to leave or will the police station be forever haunted? Note: Ghosts from the classic short Lonesome Ghosts make a cameo.
55	14	"Of Mice and Menace"	October 21, 1993	4311-007	BK-52
Flaps and three mice steal from the toon museum, Dumbo's flag. Bonkers adopts the three mice as pets, while Miranda arrests Flaps. Bonkers endures their abuse, as they endure his embarrassing welfare. The mice soon turn against Flaps and reform for their crimes.
56	15	"Toon for a Day"	October 22, 1993; Disney Channel preview: June 6, 1993	4311-004	BK-50
After Wildman Wyatt is arrested, Sgt. Grating gets hit on the head convinced he's Bucky Buzzsaw, causing problems. Wildman escapes and goes after Grating. After a round of ambushes, Grating takes care of Wildman with a large statue.
57	16	"The Stork Exchange"	October 25, 1993; Disney Channel preview: March 14, 1993	4311-003	BK-49
Sleazy Lilith DuPrave kidnaps the storks who bring Toon babies, as part of a plot to smuggle a stolen weapon out of the country.
58	17	"Dog Day AfterToon"	October 26, 1993	4311-011	BK-56
After the "Pitts and Smarts" show is cancelled, Pitts threatens a bank with a bomb for a demand to get back into showbiz. Bonkers tries everything to convince Pitts until they get into a chase to the airport, when Bonkers blows Pitts with his own bomb.
59	18	"Fistful of Anvils"	October 27, 1993; Disney Channel preview: April 18, 1993	4311-019	BK-60
Bonkers is babysitting Miranda's nephew, Timmy. Bonkers tells him a Wild Western story about Anvil Gulch starring Trail Mix to save the town from the Bug-Eyed Bandits with the aid of Two-Gun.
60	19	"The 29th Page"	October 28, 1993	4311-015	BK-58
Al Vermin seeks a fortune of Ed Barlor and his only key clue is in the 29th page. The gang try to find that page in every sort of book causing catastrophes around town. Miranda and Bonkers consult Snitch for help and soon a battle for the fortune ensues.
61	20	"Cartoon Cornered"	October 29, 1993	4311-022	BK-63
Bonkers goes to Wackytoons Studios to pick up a cheque from Duck Jones. Bucky Buzzsaw traps Sgt. Grating in the Wacky stage, whilst Wildman Wyatt escapes prison and chases Grating through the studios until Bonkers' clock comes to his rescue in stage 13. NOTE: Dumbo from Dumbo, the Doorknob from Alice in Wonderland, Pete, Goofy, and Hyacinth Hippo and Ben Ali Gator from Fantasia make cameo appearances

== Compilations (1993) ==
No.	Title	Original release date	Prod. code	BK No.
62	"The Rubber Room Song"	September 30, 1993	4311-147	BK-18
The Rubber Room Song Reprise Ski Patrol – Paramedics Bonkers and Jitters go to take the injured skier Grumbles to the Plummet Summit Hospital for Nurse Fawn Deer. Bonkers in Space – In the future, Bonkers and Jitters work in spaceship-wash outfits at the Intergalactic Carwash space station run by Grumbles, but Jitters accidentally gets carried off in space while Bonkers puts the moves on Fawn Deer, so Bonkers goes with Fawn to rescue him. Draining Cats and Dogs – Plumbers Bonkers and Jitters are sent by Grumbles to help Fawn Deer with her flooded house when her pipes burst, but Bonkers bursts the kitchen pipe.
63	"O Cartoon! My Cartoon!"	November 10, 1993	4311-149	BK-40
Bonkers recites a parody of the poem "O Captain! My Captain", while Fall-Apart demonstrates the words. Get Me a Pizza (Hold the Minefield) – A black-and-white newsreel tells of how World War I hero Bonkers bravely delivered pizzas to our boys in the front lines. Spatula Party – Bonkers' new neighbor Fawn Deer wants to borrow a spatula, and so Bonkers scurries all around the neighborhood trying to get one. Sheerluck Bonkers – Victorian-era detective Sheerluck Bonkers tries to find out who's stolen a priceless pendant from Princess Fawn of Doe-mania.
64	"If"	November 16, 1993	4311-150	BK-46
Bonkers recites a parody of the poem with the same name, while Jitters demonstrates Toon physics. Petal to the Metal – Grumbles sends Bonkers to deliver flowers to the starlet Fawn Deer in a matter of time or else he is fired. Bonkers passes a lot of troubles during the way. This segment was released to theaters as an animated short accompanying 3 Ninjas and is the first "He's Bonkers" short. Dogzapoppin' – Bonkers has to give an important package to his boss Grumbles, who is crippled in bed, while avoiding his nasty dog. Trail Mix Bonkers & the Pony Express (originally Trail Mix Bonkers) – Pony express rider Trail Mix Bonkers delivers two money plates to California and fights the Grumbles Kid.
65	"Goldijitters and the 3 Bobcats"	November 24, 1993	4311-148	BK-34
Bonkers tells a parodic tale of Goldilocks and the 3 Bears, where Goldilocks is Jitter and one of the three bobcats is Bonkers. Quest for Firewood – In the Stone Age, Bonkers embarks on a job to collect firewood for some freezing cavemen, except that the source of wood is inhabited by a pterosaur. Get Me to the Church on Time – Bonkers takes Jitters on a trip to the church for his marriage with Tanya Trunk, causing him a lot of inconvenient difficulties along the way. Gobble Gobble Bonkers – On Jitters' farm, Bonkers gets a turkey for Grumbles' Thanksgiving dinner, but has to rescue her when he realises she's the dinner.
