= Dean Wellins =

American filmmaker (born 1971)

- Born: Dean Wellins; March 24, 1971 (age 55); Zaragoza, Spain
- Education: CalArts
- Occupations: Film director; Storyboard artist; Screenwriter; Animator
- Years active: 1990−present
- Employers: Turner Feature Animation (1990–1994); Renegade Animation (1994–1996); Warner Bros. Animation (1996–2000); Walt Disney Animation Studios (2000–2022); The SPA Studios (2022–2023); PaperGames Animation (2023–present)

Dean Wellins (born March 24, 1971) is an American film director, storyboard artist, screenwriter, and animator. He is best known for his work at Walt Disney Animation Studios, including directing the short film Tick Tock Tale (2010), co-directing the feature film Raya and the Last Dragon (2021), and directing several episodes of the streaming series Baymax! (2022).

== Early life ==
Dean Wellins was born in Zaragoza, Spain, on March 24, 1971. From 1990 to 1992, he was enrolled at CalArts.

== Career ==
In 1990, he began his career at Turner Feature Animation's internship program as a character breakdown artist for The Pagemaster (1994). In 1994, he worked at Renegade Animation as a character animator on Gargoyles: The Game (1995). In 1996, he moved to Warner Bros. Animation where he worked as an animator on The Iron Giant (1999), which got him nominated at the 27th Annie Awards for "Outstanding Achievement for Character Animation in a Feature Production" and "Outstanding Achievement for Storyboarding in a Feature Production". In 1999, he served as a supervising animator on Osmosis Jones (2001) and Duck Dogers (2003).

In August 2000, he moved to Walt Disney Animation Studios where he served as a character animator on Treasure Planet (2002) and a story artist on Chicken Little (2005). In 2006, he served as a story artist on Bolt (2008). In April 2007, he signed on to direct the Disney animated film Tangled (2010), alongside Glen Keane. However, in October 2008, it was reported that he had left the film as director, but remained as a story artist, prior to pitching "three new ideas for one of [Disney's] future feature projects". By 2009, he directed the short film Tick Tock Tale (2010) and served as a character animator on The Princess and the Frog (2009).

During the 2010s, he served as a story artist on several Disney films, including Wreck-It Ralph (2012), Frozen (2013), Tomorrowland (2015), Big Hero 6 (2014), Zootopia (2016), Moana (2016), and Ralph Breaks the Internet (2018). In October 2018, he was set to direct a film titled Dragon Empire, alongside Paul Briggs. In August 2020, Disney announced that Don Hall and Carlos López Estrada replaced Wellins and Briggs as directors on the film, retitled Raya and the Last Dragon (2021), with Wellins and Briggs demoted to co-directors. Story writer John Ripa later replaced Wellins as a co-director, with Wellins only credited as a story writer in the final film. In 2022, he made his directorial debut when he directed 3 episodes of the Disney+ streaming series Baymax!.

In the same year, he left Disney to join The SPA Studios where he would serve as co-director and head of story on Sergio Pablos' feature film Ember, to be released by Netflix. However, by December 2022, Netflix canceled the project due to its lengthy production. By 2023, Wellins moved to PaperGames Animation where he would direct an upcoming feature film based on the Nikki Nuannuan video game series.

== Filmography ==
=== Feature films ===
Year	Title	Director	Story Artist	Story Writer	Animator	Other	Notes	Ref(s)
1994	The Pagemaster	No	No	No	No	Yes	Character breakdown artist	
1998	The Iron Giant	No	Yes	No	Character	Yes	Music: "Duck and Cover"	
2001	Osmosis Jones	No	No	No	Character	No	Character: "Thrax"	
2002	Treasure Planet	No	No	No	Character	No	Character: "Jim Hawkins"	
2002	Eight Crazy Nights	No	No	No	Yes	No		
2004	Fat Albert	No	No	No	Yes	No		
2005	Chicken Little	No	Yes	No	No	No		
2008	Bolt	No	Yes	No	No	No		
2009	The Princess and the Frog	No	No	Additional story material	Character	No	Character: "Dr. Facilier"	
2010	Tangled	Replaced	Yes	Additional story material	No	No	Replaced during development	
2012	Wreck-It Ralph	No	Yes	No	No	No		
2013	Free Birds	No	No	No	No	Yes	Character designer	
2013	Frozen	No	Yes	No	No	No		
2014	Big Hero 6	No	Yes	No	No	Yes	Creative leadership	
2015	Tomorrowland	No	Yes	No	No	No		
2016	Zootopia	No	Yes	No	No	No		
2016	Moana	No	Yes	No	No	Yes	Creative leadership	
2018	Ralph Breaks the Internet	No	Yes	No	No	Yes	Additional voices; Creative leadership	
2019	Frozen II	No	No	No	No	Yes	Creative leadership	
2021	Raya and the Last Dragon	Replaced	No	Yes	No	Yes	Replaced during production; Studio & creative leadership	
2021	Encanto	No	No	No	No	Yes	Creative leadership	
2026	Ray Gunn	No	Yes	No	No	No		
TBA	Untitled Nikki Nuannuan film †	Yes	TBA	TBA	TBA	TBA	In production	

=== Short films ===
Year	Title	Director	Animator	Writer	Voice Role	Ref(s)
1997	Pullet Surprise	No	Yes	Story	—N/a	
2010	Tick Tock Tale	Yes	No	Yes	Thief / Bobby	
2015	The Dunk to End All Dunks	No	Yes	No	—N/a	

=== Television ===
Year	Title	Director	Story Artist	Other	Notes	Ref(s)
1997	What a Cartoon!	No	No	Yes	Composer and animation consultant Episode: "Strange Things"	
1997	101 Dalmatians: The Series	No	No	Yes	Character designer Episode: "Artist Formerly Known as Spot" / "Nose Knows"	
1998–2000	Histeria!	No	Yes	No	12 episodes	
2000	Buzz Lightyear of Star Command	No	Yes	No	Episode: "Strange Invasion"	
2003	Duck Dogers	No	Yes	Yes	Additional story material 2 episodes	
2022	Baymax!	Yes	No	No	3 episodes	

=== Video games ===
Year	Title	Notes	Ref(s)
1995	Gargoyles: The Game	Character animator: "Goliath"	

== Accolades ==
Award	Date	Category	Title	Result	Ref(s)
Annie Awards	November 6, 1999	Outstanding Achievement for Character Animation in a Feature Production	The Iron Giant	Nominated	
Annie Awards	November 6, 1999	Outstanding Achievement for Storyboarding in a Feature Production	The Iron Giant	Nominated	
Annie Awards	November 11, 2001	Outstanding Achievement for Character Animation in a Feature Production	Osmosis Jones	Nominated	
Annie Awards	February 4, 2017	Outstanding Achievement for Storyboarding in a Feature Production	Zootopia	Won	
Children's and Family Emmy Awards	December 16–17, 2023	Outstanding Directing for an Animated Program	Baymax!	Nominated	
Visual Effects Society Awards	February 19, 2011	Outstanding Achievement in an Animated Short	Tick Tock Tale	Nominated	
