= King Arthur (video game) =

2004 video game

- Cover art
- Developers: Krome Studios; Lavastorm Analytics (mobile)
- Publishers: Konami; Walt Disney Internet Group (mobile)
- Director: Steve Stamatiadis
- Producers: Guy Cooper; Paul Armatta
- Designer: Robert Watson
- Programmer: James Podesta
- Artist: Stuart MacKenzie
- Composer: Jason Graves
- Platforms: GameCube; PlayStation 2; Xbox; Mobile
- Release: NA: November 16, 2004; EU: February 25, 2005
- Genre: Action-adventure
- Modes: Single-player, multiplayer

King Arthur is a 2004 action-adventure game based on the 2004 film of the same title.

== Gameplay ==
In the game, the player controls King Arthur and his friends. Each level has two players, and one of them can be chosen by the player. The other one will be either computer controlled or controlled by second player. There are many characters including Arthur, Bors, Tristan, Lancelot, etc. The game follows the storyline of the film, with some minor alterations.

== Reception ==
Reception

Aggregate scores
Aggregator	Score			
Aggregator	GameCube	mobile	PS2	Xbox
GameRankings	58%	65%	57%	59%
Metacritic	60/100	N/A	59/100	61/100

Review scores
Publication	Score			
Publication	GameCube	mobile	PS2	Xbox
Game Informer	7.25/10	N/A	7.25/10	7.25/10
GamePro	N/A	N/A	3.5/5	N/A
GameSpot	6.4/10	5/10	6.4/10	6.4/10
GameSpy	3/5	4/5	3/5	3/5
GameZone	N/A	N/A	6/10	N/A
IGN	6.9/10	8.5/10	6.9/10	6.9/10
Nintendo Power	2.7/5	N/A	N/A	N/A
Official U.S. PlayStation Magazine	N/A	N/A	1/5	N/A
Official Xbox Magazine (US)	N/A	N/A	N/A	7/10
X-Play	2/5	N/A	2/5	N/A

The game received "mixed" reviews on all platforms according to the review aggregation website Metacritic.
