= Bonkers (American TV series) =

American animated television series

- Genre: Crime-comedy; Mystery; Slapstick comedy
- Created by: Greg Weisman; Duane Capizzi; Robert Hathcock; Richard Trueblood; Len Smith; Larry Latham (Note: Latham is the responsible producer of the 12 He's Bonkers shorts of 1992 that were collected in four special extra compilation episodes, but was also one of the directors in the episodes of the series.)
- Inspired by: Who Framed Roger Rabbit by Jeffrey Price; Peter S. Seaman
- Voices of: Jim Cummings; Earl Boen; Charlie Adler; Ron Perlman; Frank Welker; Corey Burton; Karla DeVito; Robert Ridgely; April Winchell; Maurice LaMarche; Sherry Lynn; Eileen Brennan; Rip Taylor
- Theme music composer: Randy Petersen; Kevin Quinn
- Composers: Mark Watters; Stephen James Taylor; Thom Sharp (uncredited)
- Country of origin: United States
- Original language: English
- No. of seasons: 1
- No. of episodes: 65 (list of episodes)

Production
- Producers: Robert Taylor (Note: Taylor produced the "Lucky Piquel" episodes); Greg Weisman; Duane Capizzi; Bob Hathcock (Note: Weisman, Capizzi and Hathcock produced the "Miranda Wright" episodes)
- Running time: 22 minutes
- Production company: Walt Disney Television Animation

Original release
- Network: The Disney Channel preview (1993); Broadcast syndication (1993–1994)
- Release: September 4, 1993 – February 23, 1994

Related
- Raw Toonage

Bonkers is an American police procedural animated television series and a spin-off of the short series called He's Bonkers, which mainly aired in Raw Toonage, and was inspired by the film Who Framed Roger Rabbit (1988). The show originally aired from September 4, 1993, to February 23, 1994 after a preview of the series aired on The Disney Channel from February 28 to June 6, 1993. The nine episodes of the Disney Channel preview aired in October 1993 in the original syndication. The original syndicated run was available as part of the two-hour programming block The Disney Afternoon. Reruns of the show continued in syndication until 1996 and were later shown on Toon Disney until late 2004.

== Premise ==
Bonkers D. Bobcat, a formerly popular cartoon star, has dropped out of show business and become a police officer. He is now the junior partner of Detective Lucky Piquel in the Los Angeles Police Department, a grim and ill-tempered human who hates toons. Throughout the series, the pair work together to solve crimes in the Hollywood, Los Angeles, California region. Bonkers repeatedly tries to win Piquel's praise, but usually ruins missions with his goofy antics, though he sometimes ultimately saves the day.

After working with Bonkers for several episodes, Piquel is given an FBI job in Washington, D.C. by "New Partners on the Block". Initially happy to leave Bonkers, he finally realizes that he had grown to love him. He takes along the police radio, the light, Toots and Fall-Apart Rabbit. At the end of the first "Lucky" episodes, Bonkers is assigned a second partner, the attractive and cool-headed Officer Miranda Wright. Although also human, she is far more patient and tolerant of his antics than was Piquel. With Miranda, Bonkers becomes the brunt of the slapstick once more.

== Episodes ==
Groups	Episodes	Originally released	
Groups	Episodes	First released	Last released
1	41	September 4, 1993	February 23, 1994
Compilations		September 30, 1993	November 24, 1993
2	20	February 28, 1993	October 29, 1993

== Characters ==
=== Bonkers D. Bobcat ===
Bonkers, as he appears in the series

Bonkers D. Bobcat (voiced by Jim Cummings) is an overly energetic and hyperactive cartoon anthropomorphic bobcat who works in the Toon Division of the Hollywood PD and was once a big name cartoon star from the He’s Bonkers shorts (Raw Toonage) for Wackytoons Studios. He was fired due to his show being bumped out of first place in the ratings. He was introduced to law enforcement when he unknowingly saved cartoon celebrity Donald Duck from a park mugger (mostly due to the help of officer Lucky Piquel) and was given full credit for the mugger's capture. Police Chief Leonard Kanifky mistakes Bonkers' fictional escapades for real police work and asks him to work for the Hollywood PD, which he accepts due to being unemployed. Although Bonkers means well, he usually messes up cases for his fellow officers due to his lack of experience.

=== Supporting characters ===
- Fall Apart Rabbit (voiced by Frank Welker) is Bonkers' clumsy best friend and stunt-double back during Bonkers' Hollywood days. He literally falls apart at the drop of a hat and must wear bandages over various body parts to keep himself from dismantling. By the episode "New Partners on the Black", Fall Apart Rabbit travels with the Piquel family.
- Fawn Deer (voiced by Nancy Cartwright) is Bonkers' main love interest and co-star when he was a cartoon star. Bonkers is willing to do just about anything to please and impress her. Fawn reciprocates his love for her, having kissed him on numerous occasions.

==== Piquel family ====
- Detective Lucky Shirley Piquel (voiced by Jim Cummings) is a police detective and Bonkers' main partner. He is a serious, hard-boiled detective whose by-the-book nature is at odds with Bonkers' decidedly more maniacal approach to crime solving. By "New Partners on the Block", he was offered an FBI job in Washington DC and leaves with his family, Toots, Police Light, and Fall Apart Rabbit
- Marilyn Piquel (voiced by Sherry Lynn) is Lucky's child genius daughter. She is an aspiring artist as well as a script/story writer and has deep connection to toons such as Bonkers, with her favorite toon being TV star Skunky Skunk. She is more than capable of taking care of herself and aids her father in a number of his cases often being the words of wisdom or a source of knowledge to Lucky.
- Dilandra "Dyl" Piquel (voiced by April Winchell) is Lucky's understanding wife who supports her husband and at times encourages their daughter Marilyn.

==== Wright family ====
- Officer Miranda Wright (voiced by Karla DeVito) is a police officer who works at the same police station as Lucky, but she and Bonkers later works at a different police station in few episodes later. While originally seen as a Kanifky's secretary in "Hear No Bonkers, See No Bonkers", she becomes Bonkers' second partner by "New Partners on the Block" and she coolheadedly tolerates his antics. Her name is a play on Miranda rights.
- Shirley Wright (voiced by Erin Gray) is a news reporter and Miranda's older sister.
- Timmy Wright (voiced by Dana Hill) is the troublesome nephew of Miranda Wright, who Bonkers babysits.

==== Los Angeles Police Department officers ====
- Leonard Kanifky (voiced by Earl Boen) is the absent-minded chief of police and is the boss of Bonkers, Lucky, and those that work at the Los Angeles Police Department. While absent for most of season two, he did appear in some of Miranda Wright era episodes "Cartoon Cornered", "Dog Day Aftertoon" and "When the spirit moves you"
- Sergeant Francis Q. Grating (voiced by Ron Perlman) is a police sergeant and the boss of Bonkers and Miranda who also answers to Kanifky. He is often driven crazy by Bonkers since meeting him in "New Partners on the Block", causing him to dislike toons in general and occasionally throw Bonkers out of his office. Though he mellowed down by "Cartoon Cornered" after Bonkers saved his life

==== Recurring civilian characters ====
- Jitters A. Dog (voiced by Jeff Bennett) – A small, nervous dog who is Bonkers's friend and one of his sidekicks. His role in the series was of the straight man, constantly having serious bodily harm done to him through Bonkers' recklessness. His catchphrase, in reference to this, is "I hate my life".
- Grumbles Grizzly (voiced by Rodger Bumpass) – A grizzly bear who was Bonkers' strict boss or, sometimes, arch-enemy in "He's Bonkers" shorts. He later became his neighbor.
- The Mad Hatter and March Hare – Appearing from Disney's Alice in Wonderland, the Mad Hatter (voiced by Corey Burton) and March Hare (voiced by Jesse Corti) make three appearances in the show. They live in the Hollywood Sign.
- Toots (voiced by Frank Welker) – Bonkers' pet horn, appearing only in the "Lucky Episodes", including New Partners on the Block. He likes to help Bonkers and Lucky in their cases and always sits on Lucky's office chair.
- Police Light (voiced by Charlie Adler) – A toon police light who likes music and dance.
- Broderick (voiced by Frank Welker) – The toon radio whose sounds sounds like a real police radio. He appears only in the "Lucky Episodes".
- Harry the Handbag (voiced by Frank Welker) – A deeply troubled toon who captured and stored objects and people inside of himself in a misguided belief that it would end his loneliness.
- Tiny (voiced by Charlie Adler) – A huge but polite hamster who stayed at Lucky's house to hide from a scary shadow, which turns out to be his old friend Mr. Big.
- Pops Clock (voiced by Stuart Pankin) – A toon timekeeper who was angered that nobody appreciated him for his work.
- Skunky Skunk (voiced by S. Scott Bullock) – A favorite toon TV star of Marilyn Piquel who was framed for manslaughter by an embittered celebrity chef, who then tried to arrange a "fatal accident" for him.
- Professor Ludwig Von Drake (voiced by Corey Burton) – A scientist duck who occasionally appears as a scientific expert or creator of inventions that Bonkers uses in his cases.
- Roderick Lizzard (voiced by Jeff Bennett) – A yellow iguana and a temperamental actor with the manners of a British aristocrat.
  - Tuttle Turtle (voiced by Maurice LaMarche) – A toon turtle who is the valet of Roderick Lizzard.
- Bucky Buzzsaw (voiced by Pat Fraley) – A toon beaver who stars in his own show at Wackytoon Studios.
- Slap, Sniffle and Flop – The toon mascots of the Weetie Crunchy cereal. Loosely based on Snap, Crackle and Pop, the mascots of Rice Krispies.
- Donald Duck (voiced by Tony Anselmo) – A famous Disney duck who Bonkers saved from being robbed in "Going Bonkers".
- Mickey Mouse (voiced by Wayne Allwine) – A famous Disney mouse, he appears in the episode "I Oughta Be in Toons" (but is almost never seen or mentioned on-screen) and makes a cameo in "Casabonkers".
- Darkwing Duck (voiced by Jim Cummings) – He occasionally appears in the "Miranda" episodes.
- Mrs. Francine Kanifky (voiced by Tress MacNeille) – The wife of Leonard Kanifky.

==== Recurring antagonists ====
- Wacky Weasel (voiced by Rip Taylor) - The cunningest toon villain that ever existed who had a fixation for eggs of any kind, which originally led to his capture. Upon breaking out of jail, he went on a rampage through the city, running rings round the entire police force, before finally being outsmarted by Bonkers.
- The Rat (voiced by Brad Garrett) - A human who disguised himself as a toon rat in a bid to replace Mickey Mouse.
- Mr. Malone (voiced by Alex Rocco) - A human.
  - The Ape (voiced by Chuck McCann) - Mr. Malone's toon pink gorilla accomplice.
- Chick and Stu (voiced by Chick Vennera and Tino Insana)
- Mammoth Mammoth (voiced by Stuart Pankin) - A toon mammoth whose role is a superhero and pretends to be a real one.
- Toon Bomb (voiced by Jess Harnell) - A toon bomb who likes to make jokes and explodes when it gets nervous.
- Hoagie, Knuckles, and Chumps (voiced by Rob Paulsen and Pat Fraley) - They are a trio of shady contractors who build shoddy houses and frame The Mean Old Wolf for the collapse of said houses.
- Mr. Big (voiced by S. Scott Bullock) - A toon mouse who, despite his name, is very small. He is a friend to Tiny, who is a huge but polite hamster. He used a giant shadow to scare him.
- The Weather Toons – Five toons, including Sunny (the sun), Cloudy (a rain cloud), Snowy (a drift of snow), Sparky (a lightning bolt), and Toony Tornado (a tornado).
- Stretch and Squash (voiced by Jess Harnell and Corey Burton) - Two faded toon criminals who capture good cartoons to steal their colors.
- The Mole (voiced by John Astin) - A toon mole who is the cause of Lucky's stress.
- Louse A. Nominous (voiced by Brad Garrett) - An unreformable toon criminal who Bonkers and Lucky were forced to reform. He eats anything in his path (usually furniture).
- Ma Parker (voiced by June Foray) - is a dog-faced toon tow truck who has tricked Lucky into thinking she’s really sweet, but is found out by Bonkers that she’s really a criminal who is stealing parts of their police car to build herself a suit of armor for a monster truck rally.
  - Wooly and Bully - Ma Parker's toon sidekicks.
- Scatter Squirrel (voiced by Tino Insana) - A crazed thief with a fixation for nuts.
- Toon Pencil (voiced by S. Scott Bullock) - A toon graffiti artist who spread toon graffiti all over Hollywood.
- Zoom and Boom (voiced by Rob Paulsen and Pat Fraley) - A toon camera and a toon microphone who tried to destroy Piquel's reputation when he wanted to be the cop of the year.
- Turbo, Banshee and Kapow - Three trolls who replaced Slap, Sniffle and Flop in their cereal commercial and tried to frame them for stealing prizes in the cereal boxes.
- Two-Bits (voiced by Gilbert Gottfried) - An executive for Grandpa Arnie's Ant Show who uses a vacuum to steal the audience's change so that he can reunite with "Nicky", a nickel he had lost when his father put it in a parking meter. Two-Bits stops stealing change after Lucky gives him his last nickel, which turns out be Nicky.
- Al Vermin (voiced by Robert Ridgely) - A toon cockroach who is Miranda and Bonkers' nemesis from the "Miranda Wright" era episodes.
- Lilith DuPrave (voiced by Eileen Brennan) - A sleazy business woman and one of Bonkers and Miranda's nemesis who is the owner of a printing office. She is also responsible for smuggling weapons and kidnapping toons.
  - Mr. Blackenblue (voiced by Maurice LaMarche) - A heavily armed, powerfully-built man who is the bodyguard of Lilith DuPrave.
- WildMan Wyatt (voiced by Pat Fraley) - Sergeant Grating's sworn enemy.
- Flaps the Elephant (voiced by Joe Alaskey) - A massive toon elephant with small ears. He wishes he could fly like Dumbo.

== Production ==
The series played 65 episodes, as part of The Disney Afternoon. They were not created in chronological order: The "Miranda" episodes were actually produced first. This discrepancy becomes evident when observing the look of the main character in both sets of episodes. In the ''He's Bonkers" shorts, Bonkers was orange with one brown spot, golf-club-like ears, and an undone tail. When the Lucky Piquel-era episodes (produced by Robert Taylor) were made, the character had a major overhaul: skinnier ears, two black spots on each his tufts, black Tigger-like stripes on his tail, and a different uniform. In the Miranda Wright-era episodes (produced by Duane Capizzi, Robert Hathcock & Greg Weisman) Bonkers' look is similar to the one in He's Bonkers. Actually it is considered as a mixture of He's Bonkers look and the "Lucky" episodes look. The series occasionally featured special extra compilation episodes of "cartoons" from Bonkers's pre-police actor days, all lifted from the He's Bonkers/Raw Toonage series. The two-part premiere can be seen to show the reason for the difference in appearance as he mostly appears with his Black Dot Lucky design, but when he goes into makeup, his sweater is put on, and when his head re-appears, his spots have turned brown, then his ears are 'puffed' up. While this works for explaining the two designs in context, "New Partners on the Block" does not show or explain why he then decided to use a somewhat 'make up'-like version for every day.

The Raw Toonage shorts were an after-thought of production. While Bonkers was in pre-production, the Raw Toonage team headed by Larry Latham produced 12 "He's Bonkers" shorts. These shorts were, in the context of Bonkers, explained to be some of the shorts Bonkers made at Wackytoons Studios before he was fired. The first short entitled Petal to the Metal was originally shown in theaters in 1992 before the feature movie 3 Ninjas, while the rest were shown on the program Raw Toonage. In syndication, the shorts were collected into four full extra episodes with fillers of new material in between.

Meanwhile, Duane Capizzi, making his producing debut, was brought into the fold and teamed with animation veteran Robert Hathcock and charged with making 65 episodes (a full season's worth in syndication). The episodes theoretically would feature Bonkers with Wright as his partner. These episodes came back from overseas animation studios looking less than spectacular, causing considerable concern at Disney. Ultimately, the original team was replaced, and a team headed by Robert Taylor came in. Only 19 of the original-order shows survived to air; they are what is known as the "Miranda Wright episodes" of Bonkers or simply as the "Miranda" episodes. Nine of these episodes were aired on The Disney Channel during the first half of 1993 as a preview for the series, before its syndicated premiere in the fall. The 19 "Miranda Wright" episodes are shown in October 1993 in the broadcast syndication. Greg Weisman (co-creator of Disney's Gargoyles) worked on the Miranda episodes, and Bonkers's relationship with Miranda inspired Goliath's relationship with Elisa Maza.

Taylor threw out the old premise of the show. He replaced it with the Lucky Piquel scenario, but his episodes were revised and established to occur before the original episodes. 42 episodes of the "Lucky Piquel Era" were made, including one (New Partners on the Block), which attempted to bridge the gap between the two somewhat contradictory storylines.

Jim Cummings revealed in 2025 that he was among the last three finalists for the role of Bonkers, the other two being Matt Frewer and Jim Carrey, the latter of whom was jokingly confident that he won the role. Both Cummings and Maurice LaMarche believe that had he won the role, as well as a part he auditioned for in Inspector Gadget, he probably would not have pursued a live action film career.

The series was long incorrectly rumored to have originally been intended as a Roger Rabbit spin-off series which ended up being scrapped due to licensing issues from Amblin Entertainment, with Bonkers being created instead. However, in 2008, Greg Weisman, who was a writer on the series, denied this. While confirming that the title character was inspired by Roger, and the Toontown concept had also been influenced by the film, Weisman insists that Bonkers was always meant to be his own character.

The syndicated version of the series (which omits several of the original episodes that survived first-run) was last seen on Toon Disney until late 2004.

The series became available to stream on Disney+, upon its launch on November 12, 2019.

=== New Partners on the Block ===
New Partners on the Block was the "Lucky" episode that proceeded the 19 "Miranda" episodes and a transition episode that showed how Bonkers went from having Lucky Piquel as a partner to having Miranda Wright as his newest partner. The episode was much like the pilot episode/movie "Going Bonkers", using the CGI rain and bringing back the characters that were associated with Bonkers, those characters being Fawn Deer, Jitters A. Dog, and Grumbles Grizzly and, unlike the pilot, had more speaking and screen time.

At the end of the episode, Bonkers, along with Miranda and Lucky, capture the main villain, bomber Fireball Frank and rescue FBI agent Tolson in the process, making Bonkers and Miranda a team and giving Lucky a job as an FBI agent in Washington, D.C. Piquel. His family Dyl (wife) and Marilyn (daughter), Fall-Apart Rabbit, Toots and Brodrick the toon radio all subsequently relocated to Washington, D.C., allowing them to be written out of the show.

This episode was removed from rotation in the United States after the 1995 Oklahoma City bombing due to its bombing/terrorism plot, and was consequently never rerun on Toon Disney, even before Disney's stricter censorship policies following the September 11 attacks. Another 3 episodes, "Fall Apart Bomb Squad", "Witless for the Prosecution", and "The Stork Exchange", were also never shown on Toon Disney for similar reasons. However, three of those episodes have been rerun in Europe (especially in Italy). In addition, those three episodes are available to stream on Disney+.

== Home media ==
Bonkers was released on five VHS tapes and Betamax tapes in 1994 by Walt Disney Home Video, each containing no more than two episodes. They include the following:

VHS titles	Episodes	Release date
Going Bonkers	"Going Bonkers" (Parts 1 and 2)	1994
The Day The Toon Stood Still	"The Day The Toon Stood Still" "Is Toon Fur Really Warm?"	1994
Hear No Bonkers, See No Bonkers	"Hear No Bonkers, See No Bonkers" "Never Cry Pig"	1994
Frame That Toon	"Frame That Toon" "Color Me Piquel"	1994
Get Wacky	"Get Wacky" "Stressed to Kill"	1994

== Board game ==
A board game based on the series called The Bonkers Gamewas released by Milton Bradley in 1993 where players moved Bonkers and Fall Apart Rabbit around the board by collecting different colored footprints. The first person to collect three footprints of the color determind by a magnifying glass was the winner.

== Video games ==
The series inspired three video games. The first, titled Bonkers, is a platform game by Capcom, released for the Super NES in October 1994. In the game, Bonkers must retrieve three items stolen from a museum.

An action game by Sega, also titled Bonkers, was released in 1994 for the Sega Genesis. It consists of four mini-games in which Bonkers attempts to apprehend criminals from the series.

The third game, Disney's Bonkers: Wax Up!, was published for the Game Gear in 1995, followed three years later by a Brazilian-only release on the Master System. In the game, Bonkers sets out to rescue Lucky and several toons who have been captured.

== See also ==
- The Adventures of Rocky and Bullwinkle
