= Tick Tock Tale =

2010 American animated short film

- Official release poster
- Directed by: Dean Wellins
- Written by: Dean Wellins
- Produced by: Dorothy McKim
- Starring: Dean Wellins
- Cinematography: Adolph Lusinsky
- Edited by: William J. Caparella
- Music by: Dario Marianelli
- Production company: Walt Disney Animation Studios
- Distributed by: Walt Disney Studios; Motion Pictures
- Release dates: June 8, 2010 (Annecy); August 11, 2015 (Worldwide)
- Running time: 6 minutes
- Country: United States
- Language: English

Tick Tock Tale is a 2010 American animated short film written and directed by Dean Wellins, produced by Walt Disney Animation Studios, and distributed by Walt Disney Studios Motion Pictures. The short had its world premiere at the Annecy International Animation Film Festival on June 8, 2010, before it was released on Digital HD and Disney Movies Anywhere on August 11, 2015 and on the Walt Disney Animation Studios Short Films Collection DVD/Blu-ray Combo Pack on August 18, 2015.

== Plot ==
In a London clock shop, the owner finishes up his work for the day. Just outside his shop, a stranger checks his pocket watch to see if it runs at the same time as the clocks in the shop before leaving. Not noticing this man, the owner turns off the lights and locks the door. The moment the owner leaves, the clocks reveal themselves to be alive, and they begin to turn their attention to a little clock on a shelf where it begins to ring its bells five minutes behind the others. Because of his different features and that it's a few minutes behind the others, the little clock is ridiculed by the others. Wanting to put a stop to this, the little clock attempts to do whatever it can to change its features, but to no avail.

Suddenly, the man from earlier arrives, forcing the clocks to stay still. Right on cue, the clocks strike midnight, and the loud noises allow the man, revealed to be a thief, to break a window on the door to unlock it without suspicion. Unfortunately for the clocks, they are forced to stay still as the thief proceeds to steal a bagful of them. Just before exiting, the thief spots a policeman patrolling nearby and waits for him to walk away. The little clock, wanting to save the stolen clocks, successfully stops the door from closing all the way by jamming itself in the door. Upon exiting the store, the little clock stands triumphantly - only for its bells to start ringing. Hearing the noise, the thief proceeds to stomp on the little clock, much to the horror of the stolen clocks. Fortunately, the sound of the little clock being stomped on was loud enough to catch the attention of the policeman, who begins to chase after the fleeing thief.

The next day, the store owner is informed by the policeman of the attempted theft. After picking up the destroyed remains of the little clock, the owner proceeds to throw it away. Suddenly, just as the owner sits in his office, he hears a clatter in the other room; he discovers that the little clock has been tossed onto a counter (courtesy of the other clocks) right next to a sign that reads "No repair is too small." Wanting to fulfill his store's policy, the owner spends his day fixing up the little clock into becoming fully operational. After placing the little clock on the shelf, the owner closes his shop for the day. At that moment, one of the clocks on the shelf fixes the little clock's time so that it can ring on cue with the others, who now see the little clock as a hero.

== Voice cast ==
- Dean Wellins as Thief / Bobby

== Development ==
In 2006, while working as the head of story on Bolt (2008), Dean Wellins pitched the concept of Tick Tock Tale to the then-Walt Disney Animation Studios chief creative officer John Lasseter. Lasseter greenlighted the project, allowing Wellins to storyboard the short. In April 2007, after he edited together the short's storyboards, Wellins paused its development in order to direct Tangled (2010), alongside Glen Keane. By October 2008, he exited Tangled, which allowed him to restart development on Tick Tock Tale in April 2009. The film was produced by Dorothy McKim, while its musical score was composed by Dario Marianelli. In a 2010 interview, Wellins cited One Hundred and One Dalmatians (1961) as the inspiration for the setting and aesthetic of the short.

== Release ==
Tick Tock Tale had its world premiere at the Annecy International Animation Film Festival on June 8, 2010. The film subsequently played at the 13th Hiroshima International Animation Festival in August 2010, the 25th Ottawa International Animation Festival in October 2010, and the 12th Animation Show of Shows on December 3, 2010, before it was released on Digital HD and Disney Movies Anywhere on August 11, 2015 and on the Walt Disney Animation Studios Short Films Collection DVD/Blu-ray Combo Pack on August 18, 2015. The film was originally set to be released in front of The Princess and the Frog (2009), but it was pulled due to not being "five minutes or less".

== Critical reception ==
Corine Cohen of Broadwayshowbiz praised the short, saying "it is an adorable short with heart that is also very funny". Movie Deputy gave the short a 5.75/10 rating, writing "This is a surprisingly cute and somewhat tragic tale about imagining something greater than what we see in front of us".

== Accolades ==
Award	Date	Category	Result	Ref(s)
Visual Effects Society Awards	February 19, 2011	Outstanding Achievement in an Animated Short	Nominated	
