= DuckTales: Scrooge's Loot =

2013 video game

- Developers: Disney Interactive Studios; Complex Games
- Publisher: Disney Mobile
- Series: DuckTales
- Platforms: iOS, Android
- Release: iOS: CAN: July 26, 2013; USA: September 2013
- Mode: Single-player

DuckTales: Scrooge's Loot is a DuckTales-based video game available for iOS and Android. It was released in Canada on July 26, 2013, and the US in September, before being available in other countries. It was developed by Disney Interactive Studios and Canadian studio Complex Games.

== Storyline ==
Uncle Scrooge is robbed by Flintheart Glomgold, Ma Beagle, and Magica De Spell. The player has to recover as much stolen loot as possible.

== See also ==
- List of Disney video games
