= The Disney Afternoon Collection =

2017 video game compilation

- Promotional art, featuring (clockwise from top left) DuckTales (Scrooge McDuck), Chip 'n Dale Rescue Rangers (Chip 'n' Dale), TaleSpin (Baloo), and Darkwing Duck (Drake Mallard / Darkwing Duck)
- Developer: Digital Eclipse
- Publishers: Capcom; Atari (Nintendo Switch, Nintendo Switch 2)
- Engine: Eclipse Engine
- Platforms: PlayStation 4, Windows, Xbox One, Nintendo Switch, Nintendo Switch 2
- Release: PS4, Windows, Xbox One; April 18, 2017; Nintendo Switch, Nintendo Switch 2; February 26, 2026
- Genre: Various
- Modes: Single-player, multiplayer

The Disney Afternoon Collection is a video game compilation developed by Digital Eclipse and published by Capcom. It features six video games originally developed by Capcom and released for the Nintendo Entertainment System (NES), all based on animated series from the television block The Disney Afternoon, which ran in syndication from 1990 to 1997. It was released on April 18, 2017, for PlayStation 4, Windows, and Xbox One. An expanded port for Nintendo Switch and Nintendo Switch 2, featuring two additional Super Nintendo Entertainment System (SNES) games, was released by Atari on February 26, 2026.

== Gameplay ==
Included games
| 1989 | DuckTales |
| 1990 | Chip 'n Dale Rescue Rangers |
| 1991 | TaleSpin |
| 1992 | Darkwing Duck |
| 1993 | DuckTales 2 |
| 1993 | Goof Troop (Switch/Switch 2) |
| 1994 | Chip 'n Dale Rescue Rangers 2 |
| 1994 | Bonkers (Switch/Switch 2) |

Five of the six NES games in the collection are side-scrolling platform games, while TaleSpin is a shoot 'em up. The games retain their original style and gameplay, but the compilation also includes the ability to rewind game time to correct mistakes, and time attack and boss rush modes, in which players are able to compete in online leaderboards. Additionally, the compilation includes concept art, music, and additional assets created for the original games.

The two SNES games are exclusive to the Switch and Switch 2 versions, and cannot be played in the time attack or boss rush modes. One of the two games, Bonkers, is a platformer, while the other, Goof Troop, is a co-op action-adventure game. Goof Troop was one of Resident Evil creator Shinji Mikami's earliest games as a designer.

== Development ==
The collection was developed by Digital Eclipse. According to producer John Faciane, associate producer for the collection, the idea of compiling the various Capcom NES games developed in association with The Disney Afternoon show block was already in place when he joined Capcom in July 2016. He said that there was growing fan interest in these games after Digital Eclipse released the Mega Man Legacy Collection in August 2015, and when he had joined, the company was in the final stages of figuring out which games to include in the collection. The ports are based on the studio's Eclipse Engine, also used in the Mega Man Legacy Collection, which is able to take the original ROM images and decompile them so that they can then re-execute the code in a virtual machine developed for modern systems. The studio recognized, like many games of the 8-bit era, that these titles were generally difficult compared to more contemporary games, and incorporated features like save states and the rewind feature to help players. Some of the additional content for the game were from archives that Digital Eclipse's head of restoration Frank Cifaldi had made when he "pirated" the games as a youth.

On January 14, 2026, a rating for an unannounced Nintendo Switch and Nintendo Switch 2 port of the collection was found on the ESRB website. On January 28, a listing for the game appeared on the Japanese Nintendo eShop, which included screenshots of two SNES games not present in previous releases, stating that the game was to be released on February 26. The ports were officially announced the following day. Physical versions for both systems released May 29th.

== Reception ==
Reception

Aggregate score
| Aggregator | Score | | |
| Aggregator | PC | PS4 | Xbox One |
|---|---|---|---|
| Metacritic | 78/100 | 76/100 | 75/100 |

Review scores
| Publication | Score | | |
| Publication | PC | PS4 | Xbox One |
|---|---|---|---|
| Destructoid | N/A | 8/10 | N/A |
| Electronic Gaming Monthly | N/A | N/A | 7.5/10 |
| GameSpot | N/A | 7/10 | N/A |
| IGN | 7/10 | 7/10 | 7/10 |

The Disney Afternoon Collection received mostly positive reviews on upon release, earning average scores of 78 out of 100 for the PC version, 76 out of 100 for the PlayStation 4 version, and 75 out of 100 for the Xbox One version from Metacritic. Many reviewers commented on the appeal of the collection being potentially limited to players familiar with games from the 8-bit era. There is also common consensus that TaleSpin is the weakest of the games due to its brutal difficulty.

In his review for GameSpot, Jason D'Aprile called the collection "a refined time capsule that covers a very specific chapter in gaming history". He further elaborated that "while these games might not be anything to get overly excited about individually", the additional goodies make the collection "a nostalgic curiosity with heart". Samuel Claiborn of IGN called the compilation "a collection aimed squarely at fans of old-fashioned platformers that makes little effort to update them for modern conventions". Noting the varied game quality, Claiborn praised the Ducktales entries and the first Chip N' Dale game as "three hits" while bemoaning the other NES games as "three duds". Nevertheless, he had high praise for the collection's presentation and additional features.

Ray Carsillo of EGM called the Xbox One release "pure nostalgia" that could be recommended to newer Disney fans "as long as they can appreciate the 8-bit "vintage" look". However, Carsollo remarked that the game's rewind feature could sometimes cause crashes or slowdown. Reviewing the Switch 2 release, Ollie Reynolds of NintendoLife called the collection “a glorious throwback… that wisely refrains from messing too much with the games’ presentation”. While Reynolds would recommend skipping “TaleSpin, and maybe Darkwing Duck at a stretch”, he nevertheless praised the collection for representing “a particularly prolific period for Capcom” and the history of licensed games.
