= DuckTales 2 =

1993 video game

- European cover art
- Developer: Capcom (Note: Game Boy port by Make Software)
- Publisher: Capcom
- Producer: Tokuro Fujiwara
- Designer: Ichirou Mihara
- Artist: Keiji Inafune
- Composers: Minae Fujii; Akihiro Akamatsu
- Series: DuckTales
- Platforms: NES, Game Boy
- Release: NES: JP: 23 April 1993; NA: June 1993; EU: 18 November 1993; Game Boy: NA: November 1993; JP: 3 December 1993; EU: 1993
- Genre: Platformer
- Mode: Single-player

DuckTales 2 (Note: DuckTales 2 (ダックテイルズ2, Dakku Teiruzu 2)) is a 1993 platform game developed and published by Capcom for the Nintendo Entertainment System. The game was ported to the Game Boy handheld system in Japan and North America the same year. DuckTales 2 is a sequel to DuckTales, and is based on the Disney's animated TV series of the same name. Just like in the 1989 predecessor, the story involves Scrooge McDuck traveling around the globe collecting treasure. The player can freely choose levels to explore, similar to the Mega Man series. The game also features new elements such as the option to revisit a level and the additional collecting of pieces of a map to the lost treasure of McDuck.

The game was included in The Disney Afternoon Collection compilation for PC, PlayStation 4, and Xbox One released in April 2017.

== Gameplay ==
Like its predecessor, DuckTales 2 is non-linear and allows the player to choose and complete all levels in any particular order. The controls are the same as the previous game, albeit the cane jump is easier to perform. Scrooge can now use his cane to interact with various objects, such as pulling levers, firing cannons and using springy flowers to cross large gaps. Other new mechanics include hooks that Scrooge can hang from and rafts that can move Scrooge across water.

Unlike the first game, the player can return to a level that has already been completed to collect more money and items. In addition, upgrades for Scrooge's cane can be obtained from Gyro Gearloose to grant the player access to new and hidden areas in each level. When a level is completed, the player can visit a store to buy recovery items, extra lives, and other such items using any money the player has collected.

In addition to the unique treasures, each stage has a piece of the map that is hidden in a treasure chest. Locating all of the map pieces is not required to complete the game, but collecting all of them opens up an optional sixth stage in which the lost treasure of McDuck can be found.

== Plot ==
As the game opens, Huey runs to his uncle Scrooge McDuck with a torn piece of paper, which is a piece of a treasure map drawn by Scrooge's father, Fergus McDuck. Inspired to discover the hidden treasure left by Fergus, Scrooge starts an expedition to find the missing pieces, unaware that his archenemy Flintheart Glomgold is also after the lost treasure of McDuck.

Scrooge travels to Niagara Falls, a pirate ship in the Bermuda Triangle, Mu, Egypt and Scotland. Each area has its own unique treasure that is guarded by a boss. After all five main stages are cleared, Webby is kidnapped by Glomgold and held for ransom on the pirate ship in the Bermuda Triangle. Scrooge arrives and gives Glomgold the treasures, only to discover that this "Glomgold" is actually a shapeshifting robot called the D-1000 programmed to destroy him. After the D-1000 is defeated, Glomgold sinks the ship and tries to take Scrooge and the treasures with it.

Scrooge and Webby escape the ship, but the treasures go down with the vessel. Despite the loss, Scrooge admits that at least he and his family are safe and that their friendship is what truly matters. The treasures are recovered by Launchpad, cheering everybody up. If the lost treasure of McDuck was found, Scrooge reveals that he hid it from Glomgold by putting it under his hat. However, if the player has no money left at all, a bad ending plays in which Glomgold finds the lost treasure and is named the greatest adventurer in the world, which infuriates Scrooge.

== Reception ==
Reception

Review scores
Publication	Score
Electronic Gaming Monthly	7/10, 6/10, 5/10, 5/10, 6/10
GamePro	4/5 (NES); 4.5/5 (GB)
Nintendo Power	14.3/20 (NES)
Superjuegos	88/100 (GB)
VideoGames & Computer Entertainment	6/10 (NES)
Nintendo Acción	"Muy Bueno" (GB)
Super Gamer	75% (NES)

DuckTales 2's limited production run and relatively late release in June 1993, near the end of the Nintendo Entertainment System's life cycle, led to lower sales than its predecessor, and has become a rarity amongst collectors. The console version was generally well-received, with Nintendo Power praising the title's "great play control and graphics", but remarked that it was "more of the same" when compared to the original. GamePro similarly felt that "if it's more of the same you want, DuckTales 2 delivers", adding that the game "is fun while it lasts, but it's too short", nonetheless recommending it to new players.

The Game Boy version was panned by editors of Electronic Gaming Monthly, remarking that it only had "so-so" graphics and "OK" control, and didn't live up to Capcom's previous handheld titles such as the Mega Man games. GamePro, however, felt that the game was a faithful port of the console version, applauding its "sharp, clean graphics, innovative gameplay and engrossing storyline".

== See also ==
- List of Disney video games
