= Disney Tsum Tsum Festival =

2019 video game

- Nintendo Switch icon
- Developers: B.B. Studio; Hyde
- Publisher: Bandai Namco Entertainment
- Series: Disney Tsum Tsum
- Platform: Nintendo Switch
- Release: JP: October 10, 2019; WW: November 8, 2019
- Genres: Party, puzzle
- Modes: Single-player, multiplayer

Disney Tsum Tsum Festival is a 2019 party video game developed by B.B. Studio and Hyde and published by Bandai Namco Entertainment for the Nintendo Switch. It is the first console game to be based on the Disney Tsum Tsum toyline. It was released in Japan on October 10, 2019, and globally on November 8.

== Gameplay ==
Disney Tsum Tsum Festival features various Disney and Pixar characters rendered in Tsum Tsum form, as well as a Tsum Tsum version of Bandai Namco's mascot Pac-Man. The game has players play a variety of minigames in single-player, cooperative multiplayer, and competitive multiplayer, with up to four players playing online or on the same Switch console. Minigames include curling and "bubble hockey" (air hockey), among others. Festival also features a version of the original Disney Tsum Tsum mobile puzzle game originally developed by Line Corporation, making use of the Switch's touch screen held in portrait mode. The puzzle game also features two-player local or online multiplayer.

== Marketing ==
Disney Tsum Tsum Festival was announced in February 2019, during a Nintendo Direct presentation. The game was released in Japan on October 10, which also saw the release of a Nintendo Switch bundle featuring a limited edition Tsum Tsum-themed console, dock, and Joy-Con (with a Mickey Mouse head-shaped Home button on the Joy-Con R); the Disney Tsum Tsum Festival game, and a code for downloadable content featuring alternate "Festival" versions of the Stitch, Mickey Mouse, Minnie Mouse, and Winnie the Pooh Tsum Tsums (which are featured on the Switch console and dock).

== Reception ==
Reception

Aggregate score
Aggregator	Score
Metacritic	63

Review score
Publication	Score
Destructoid	6/10

Disney Tsum Tsum Festival received mixed to positive reception from critics, with an aggregated review score of 63 on Metacritic based on fourteen reviews.

Disney Tsum Tsum Festival was the best selling title in Japan for 7–13 October 2019. It was the 12th best selling game in Japan for the week of 28 October 2019 to 3 November 2019. Disney Tsum Tsum Festival was the 13th best selling game during 30 December to 5 January. The game was the 17th best selling game in Japan between 6–12 January 2020.
