= Disney Tsum Tsum =

Japanese stuffed toys and media franchise

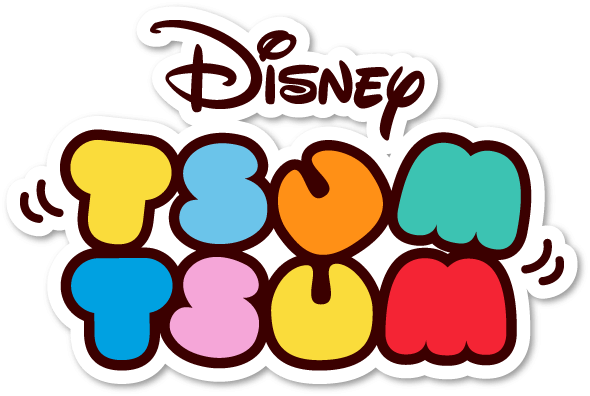
- Type: Stuffed toys
- Company: The Walt Disney Company; Polygon Pictures
- Country: Japan
- Availability: December 16, 2014–present
- Slogan: Collect 'em! Stack 'em!

Disney Tsum Tsum (Japanese: ディズニー ツムツム, Hepburn: Dizunī Tsumutsumu) (pronounced (t)soom-(t)soom) is a brand of Japanese collectible stuffed toy based upon Disney-owned characters. The name is derived from the Japanese verb tsumu, meaning "to stack", as the rectangle-shaped toys are designed to stack on top of each other, forming a pyramid shape. There are also vinyl versions of Tsums manufactured by Jakks Pacific.

The toys were first released in Japan in 2013 as a tie-in to the Tsum Tsum arcade and mobile games, respectively developed by Konami and Line Corporation. Disney began selling them in the United States in July 2014, and in Disneyland Paris the following month. Around the same time, Disney released Tsum Tsum to the South Korean market, giving away icons for use on online chat systems. As of 2014, 1.8 million Tsum Tsum toys have been sold. As of February 2019, the franchise has reached around $2.5 billion in combined mobile game and merchandise sales revenue. Disney Tsum Tsum Festival, a party game based on the toyline developed by B.B. Studio and Hyde and published by Bandai Namco Entertainment, was released for Nintendo Switch, allowing up to four players to play minigames as Tsum Tsums.

== Design ==
Tsum Tsum toys are typically made of felt, microbeads, and stuffing, though hard plastic models are also sold. They are ovular in shape and vary in size. Initially, the toys were released in three different sizes: "mini" (3.5 inches (8.9 cm) long), "medium" (11 inches (28 cm)), and "large" (17 inches (43 cm)). In June 2014, a new "mega" size (21.5 inches (55 cm)) was released to the Japanese market. In October 2015, Disney announced a subscription-only "small" size (7.5 inches (19 cm)). In November 2015, during the Japanese D23 Expo, a new "micro" size (2 inches (5.1 cm)) was introduced.

== Characters ==
Disney offers dozens of characters in the Tsum Tsum line. The line includes classic mainline characters like Mickey Mouse, Minnie Mouse, Donald Duck, Daisy Duck, Chip 'n' Dale, Pluto, and Goofy, as well as secondary Disney characters like Bambi, Pinocchio, Lady, Tramp, Tinker Bell, Cinderella, and others. Contemporary characters are also represented, including those from Lilo & Stitch, Winnie the Pooh, Toy Story, Monsters, Inc., Big Hero 6, The Aristocats, Phineas and Ferb, Star Wars, and Cars. Marvel characters are also represented, such as Spider-Man, Hulk, Iron Man, and Doctor Strange.

Disney has also released alternate character representations for holidays and special events.

On 1 August 2019, the original members of the English rock band Queen—Freddie Mercury, Brian May, Roger Taylor, and John Deacon—were added to the Japanese version of the mobile game as Tsum Tsums, with the first three added as playable characters. Selecting one as a playable character will have an instrumental version of their respectively written signature songs play as background music; Mercury features "We Are the Champions", May features "We Will Rock You", and Taylor features "Radio Ga Ga". Later updates added a playable Deacon that features "Another One Bites the Dust" and another playable Mercury based on his 1975 appearance that features "Bohemian Rhapsody". The band appears in the game as representatives for the 2018 20th Century Fox film Bohemian Rhapsody. The Tsums are exclusive to the Japanese version.

== In media ==
=== Video games ===
==== Disney Tsum Tsum ====
Disney Tsum Tsum
- Standard Disney Tsum Tsum icon. Characters around the Mickey Mouse Tsum (clockwise from upper-left): Perry, Pooh, Donald Duck, and Piglet.
- Developer: LY Corporation (formerly as Line)
- Publisher: LY Corporation (formerly as Line)
- Platforms: iOS, iPadOS, Android
- Release: JP: January 29, 2014; WW: July 1, 2014
- Genre: Puzzle

Disney Tsum Tsum (promoted as LINE: Disney Tsum Tsum) is a free-to-play mobile puzzle game for iOS and Android developed and published by Line Corporation. The game features Disney, Pixar, and Star Wars characters rendered as Tsum Tsum toys, as well as characters from media based on Disney, including the Kingdom Hearts series. It also features Cloud Strife, Tifa Lockhart, and Aerith Gainsborough from Final Fantasy VII, part of the Final Fantasy series, based on their appearances in Kingdom Hearts. The game is divided between two different versions which differ in content; the original Japanese version and a separate global version, with both versions being regularly updated separately from one another. The game requires a constant Internet connection to play.

As of April 2017, the game had surpassed 70 million downloads and grossed over $1 billion in gross revenue, bringing total franchise revenue to $2 billion when including merchandise sales, which generated around $1 billion. As of February 4, 2019, the game reached $1.5 billion in lifetime revenue, of which 96% came from Japan, bringing total franchise revenue to around $2.5 billion including merchandise sales.

In February 2022, the game shut down all operations in Russia due to their invasion of Ukraine.

===== Gameplay =====
The game's story is that Disney Tsum Tsum toys have fallen from the shelves of the Disney Store overnight and need to be put back on the shelves before the store opens. Players must drag their finger on their phone's touchscreen to connect at least three Tsums in order to clear them from the playfield, clearing as many Tsums as possible before time runs out. As Tsums are cleared, players score points and more Tsums fall in from above. Players score more points and coins, which can be used to buy new Tsums and raise their score level caps, when clearing four or more Tsums at a time. Clearing at least seven Tsums, or six when a specific boost is activated before a game, will also spawn a magical bubble, known as a bomb in the Japanese version, that immediately clears surrounding Tsums when tapped to pop them. As Tsums are cleared, they fill up a "Fever Meter" that, when full, triggers a ten-second "Fever Mode", which adds five seconds of playtime to the timer, clears away Tsums faster, and temporarily prevent combos from breaking. In addition, clearing "MyTsums", a Tsum that players select before each game, fills a meter that allows players to use their MyTsum's special ability.

There are two types of Tsums: Happiness Box Tsums and Premium Box Tsums. Happiness Boxes contain one of fourteen Tsums from the Mickey & Friends, Chip 'n' Dale, or Winnie the Pooh franchises, while the more expensive Premium Boxes contain one of an ever-increasing number of Tsums that have stronger skills than the Happiness Box Tsums and usually have a higher skill level cap. Some Tsums can only be earned via specific methods or events. Also, for certain periods of time, there may be a second option for purchasing Premium Box Tsums in either Pick-Up Capsules or Select Boxes. Pick-Up Capsules contain fifteen or twenty specific Tsums for players to earn, with players being awarded a Skill Ticket—an item that allows players to increase the skill levels of any Tsum that they already have in their collection for free—if they empty the dispenser before its availability period ends. Select Boxes contain upwards of ten or twelve Tsums, providing an increased chance of winning Tsums available in such boxes compared to buying them in the regular Premium Boxes.

There are also in-game bingo cards that award prizes when certain optional missions are completed. Completing a row, column or diagonal line of optional missions for bingo will award players various minor prizes, while completing an entire card will earn players tickets for free Tsums without having to spend coins, special Tsums, including those that cannot be earned through regular means, or Skill Tickets, depending on the card. Various time-limited events also award similar prizes through completing separate sets of missions.

Playing a round of Disney Tsum Tsum costs one "heart" (life). Hearts can be earned by waiting fifteen minutes to refill, for up to five hearts in total; any more will disable refilling until players have less than five hearts again, completing bingos or event missions, spending "Rubies", the game's premium currency that can be purchased through microtransactions or earned through leveling up or completing bingos, or by sending hearts to Line and Facebook friends who are logged into the game. Players can send one free heart to each friend per hour, and sending hearts does not cost players their own hearts.

==== Marvel Tsum Tsum ====
Marvel Tsum Tsum
- Developer: XFLAG
- Publisher: XFLAG
- Platforms: iOS, Android
- Release: WW: August 31, 2016
- Genre: Puzzle

Marvel Tsum Tsum was a free-to-play mobile puzzle game for iOS and Android developed by XFLAG and published by Mixi. The game focuses on Marvel characters rendered as Tsum Tsum toys and, despite having similar gameplay, is unrelated to Line Corporation's Disney Tsum Tsum. The game was announced on August 31, 2016 and released worldwide that same day and shut down on October 31, 2017.

==== Disney Tsum Tsum Festival ====
Disney Tsum Tsum Festival is a party video game developed by B.B. Studio and Hyde and published by Bandai Namco Entertainment for the Nintendo Switch. It contains a variety of minigames, such as curling and air hockey, and a version of the Disney Tsum Tsum mobile game. It was released in Japan on October 10, 2019, and globally on November 8.

=== Television shorts ===
Tsum Tsum is a series of comedy computer-animated shorts based on the toy line. Directed by Hiroshi Chida with CG supervision by Yoshiki Nakao at Polygon Pictures, it debuted in Japan on Disney Channel and Dlife on December 12, 2014, and in the United States on Disney Channel later that month.

=== Web series ===
Tsum Tsum Kingdom is a live-action series produced by Disney Consumer Products and Interactive Media. Debuted on Disney's website and social media on May 12, 2016, it consists of documentary-style episodes featuring stories centered on Tsum toys. Disney also produced As Told By Tsum Tsums, a series of video recaps of Disney films such as Star Wars and Alice in Wonderland with plush Tsums.

=== Comics ===
==== Marvel Tsum Tsum ====
Marvel Comics also published a four issue comic miniseries simply titled Marvel Tsum Tsum, featuring Tsum Tsums of classic Marvel superheroes accidentally appearing on Earth in the main Marvel universe and interacting with it's characters, while still believing themselves to be the real versions. The series was written by Jacob Chabot with art by David Baldeon and was published between August 3 and November 23, 2016. The Tsum Tsums also featured on a series of variant covers on Marvel comics released throughout August of that year.
