= TaleSpin (Capcom video game) =

1991 video game

- NES version cover art
- Developer: Capcom (Note: Ported to Game Boy by Dual.)
- Publisher: Capcom
- Producer: Stephan L. Butler
- Composers: Minae Fujii (NES); Hitoshi Sakimoto (GB)
- Series: TaleSpin
- Platforms: NES, Game Boy
- Release: NES: NA: December 1991; EU: September 24, 1992; Game Boy: NA: December 1992; EU: 1993
- Genre: Scrolling shooter
- Mode: Single-player

TaleSpin is a scrolling shooter video game based on the Disney television series TaleSpin. The game was developed by Capcom for the NES in 1991. A stripped down port for the Game Boy released in 1992.

The NES version of the game was included in The Disney Afternoon Collection compilation for PC, PlayStation 4, and Xbox One in April 2017, as well as its Nintendo Switch and Switch 2 release in 2026.

== Plot ==
Baloo and Kit are delivering cargo for Rebecca Cunningham. Shere Khan hires the Air Pirates, led by Don Karnage, in an attempt to sabotage their business.

== Gameplay ==
The gameplay consists of maneuvering Baloo's plane, the Seaduck, through each level, fending off incoming enemies and avoiding obstacles. Items can be collected for extra lives or to add to the total cash score. The plane can be rotated upside to traverse back through the level, but only on horizontally scrolling areas. At the end of each level, the player is required to fight a boss enemy by repeatedly shooting its weak points. After beating a level, the player has the option to buy upgrades for Baloo's plane with the money collected, before proceeding to the next level. In bonus levels, the player controls Kit on an airfoil to pop balloons for bonus points.

== Reception ==
Reception

Aggregate score
Aggregator	Score	
Aggregator	Game Boy	NES
GameRankings	63.00% (1 review)	N/A

Review scores
Publication	Score	
Publication	Game Boy	NES
Total!	N/A	59%
Super Gamer	65%	N/A
AllGame	N/A	2.5/5

Super Gamer magazine gave the Game Boy version a review score of 65%, calling it "quite a tricky shoot-'em-up" that "certainly wouldn't appeal to younger players" due to its difficulty.

Retrospective reviews, particularly within the context of The Disney Afternoon Collection and other Disney/Capcom collaborations, have been mixed to negative. Michael Ayala at Hardcore Gaming 101 described it as "not the worst game ever produced for the NES" while criticizing the "lazy, rushed design" of the levels and bemoaning there's "little reason to play it outside of nostalgia". When reviewing The Disney Afternoon Collection for NintendoLife, Ollie Reynolds criticized TaleSpin for the "excruciatingly slow rate of fire and brutal precision of your enemies' shots", citing the game as the one "you could get away with skipping entirely" within the collection. The sentiment is echoed by Samuel Claiborn at IGN, who noted "the bullet-crammed boss fights" were frustrating, even with the benefit of the collection's rewind feature.

== See also ==
- List of Disney video games
