= Bonkers (SNES video game) =

1994 video game

- Developer: Sun-L
- Publisher: Capcom
- Platform: Super NES
- Release: October 1994
- Genre: Platform
- Mode: Single-player

Bonkers (Note: Japanese: ボンカーズ ハリウッド大作戦！, Hepburn: Bonkāzu Hariuddo Daisakusen!; lit. 'Bonkers: Big Hollywood Mission!') is a 1994 platform video game developed by Sun-L and published by Capcom for the Super Nintendo Entertainment System It was originally released in North America in October 1994. It is based on the animated television series Bonkers. The game was re-released for the first time as part of the Nintendo Switch and Nintendo Switch 2 versions of The Disney Afternoon Collection, released by Atari under license from Capcom and Disney in 2026.

== Gameplay ==
Bonkers is a side-scrolling platform game. Players control police officer Bonkers D. Bobcat, who must apprehend a thief who has stolen three precious treasures from Toontown's museum: the Sorcerer's Hat (from Fantasia), the Mermaid's Voice (The Little Mermaid), and the Magic Lamp (Aladdin). The player has several abilities, including a speed dash, which is used to break through obstacles. To stop enemies, the player can throw bombs at them, jump on their heads, or perform a speed dash. The game has six levels set across Hollywood, including a mansion, downtown, an ocean liner, a sewer, and a movie studio with Old West and science-fiction sets. Boss enemies must be battled at the end of each level.

There are various objects throughout the game, such as balloons and shields. The player can acquire items by popping balloons open and can carry more bombs for every 10 shields collected. Donuts and cakes restore the player's health meter, and hearts can be collected to expand the meter.

== Reception ==
Reception

Review scores
Publication	Score
Electronic Gaming Monthly	7/10, 6/10, 7/10, 7/10, 7/10
Hyper	80/100
Mega Fun	63%
Super Play	74%
Total!	4
Computer+Videogiochi	72/100
Play Time	72%
VideoGames	6/10

Bonkers received praise for its graphics. GamePro called the game "a great first challenge for novice players". Electronic Gaming Monthly praised the sound, but considered the gameplay too easy.

Paul Dame of Windsor Star wrote that Bonkers would be at the top of his "list of games that really suck" if not for the fact that it "was made as a kids' game". He went on to write that the game's primary problem "is it is way too slow. When you get hit, it takes three to four seconds for him to recover. It may not seem like a lot but, when you're trying to play, it seems like a really longtime". Joe Blenkle of Orangevale News considered it "one of the most enjoyable" games from Capcom "in quite some time", calling it equally fun for adults and children.

In 2018, Hardcore Gaming 101 called it "a game that came and went without making much of an impact on anything", writing further, "It existed, and it was a decent use of the license, but there's so many other, better games of its type".
