= Lavastorm Analytics =

Software company based in Massachusetts

Lavastorm
- Type: Private
- Industry: Software
- Founded: 1993
- Headquarters: Boston, Massachusetts, United States; Warrington, England; Stockholm, Sweden
- Key people: Tim Segall, CEO; Martin Dawes, founder
- Products: Business intelligence tools; Data visualization tools; Analytics tools; Big data tools; Data warehousing tools; ETL tools
- Website: www.lavastorm.com

Lavastorm is a global analytics software company based in Massachusetts. The company's products are most often used by business analysts looking to take on more responsibility for data preparation and to build advanced analytics, or by IT groups who are looking for more agile ways to provision governed data to business analysts.

== History ==
The company was founded as JLM Technologies in 1993 by Justin and LeAnn Lindsey with a group of engineers from the Massachusetts Institute of Technology. Early locations in Massachusetts included Cambridge, Allston, and Waltham. The name was changed to Lavastorm in May 1999.

The company's initial focus was developing high performance Internet systems and applications, especially web sites. High-profile successes included Monster.com, the employment website; FamilySearch the free genealogy website sponsored by the Church of Jesus Christ of Latter-day Saints; EdgarWatch, the first on-Web system delivering SEC filing documents in real-time.

V. Miller Newton was the CEO of Monster.com when it hired Lavastorm to redesign its web site and infrastructure; in 1999, he moved over to the role of CEO for Lavastorm until 2003. Lindsey stayed on as Chief Solutions Officer. In September 1999 and June 2000, Lavastorm raised US$55 million in venture capital funding from partnerships including Hummer Winblad Venture Partners, Oak Investment Partners, Lehman Brothers, Reuters Venture Capital, and Intel. In 18 months, the company expanded from 20 employees to over 200, opening a Silicon Valley office in San Jose, California, and acquiring PixelDance, a web design company in Watertown, Massachusetts.

In the latter half of 2000 and 2001, as the dot-com bubble burst, Lavastorm reinvented itself. It laid off employees, and split off its Internet engineering services in San Jose, California, selling them to management. The Massachusetts operation, now only 20 employees, focused on making software for telecommunications revenue assurance after doing a project with Verizon Communications. In 2001 Lavastorm introduced the Revenue Assurance and Intercarrier Cost Management products. Drew Rockwell, a former executive at Verizon, was hired in 2002, and Newton left in 2003. Lindsey went to work for Hewlett-Packard, and later became the Chief Technology Officer for the Federal Bureau of Investigation and United States Department of Justice.

In July 2005, Lavastorm was bought by Martin Dawes Systems, a United Kingdom-based company specializing in billing and customer relationship management (CRM) software for the communications industry. Combined company annual revenues were expected to be US$35 million.

In February 2006, Lavastorm merged with Visual Wireless, a Sweden-based revenue assurance and fraud detection software company. The combined customer list includes BellSouth, Comcast, TeliaSonera, Telstra and Vodafone. Drew Rockwell, Lavastorm CEO, continued as head of the merged company. Lavastorm kept its name, but also became the Martin Dawes Systems revenue assurance and fraud management division.

On December 22, 2011, Lavastorm was de-merged from Martin Dawes Systems and re-launched as a data analytic company.

In March 2018, Lavastorm was acquired by Infogix, Inc. The product offering has been rebranded as 'Data3Sixty'

== Lavastorm Engineering ==
Lavastorm Engineering logo

The Silicon Valley spin-off called itself Lavastorm Engineering, and was one of the first companies producing mobile games. Paul Abbassi was CEO and CTO, Jason Loia was Director of Wireless Entertainment, and Albert So was the Chief Mobile Code Monkey (programmer). It produced over 30 games for mobile phones, using BREW and Java ME, mostly based on licenses from other companies, such as the movies Van Helsing, and The Incredibles, and Capcom's classic video game Mega Man. The company dissolved in 2005, with many developers moving on to found Punch Entertainment, Inc.
