= Disney's Bonkers: Wax Up! =

1995 video game

- GG Cover art
- Developers: Al Baker & Associates; Tec Toy (Master System)
- Publishers: Sega; Tec Toy (Master System)
- Designer: Thomas L. Fessler
- Platforms: Game Gear, Master System
- Release: Game Gear: US: February 1995; Master System: BR: 1998
- Genre: Platform
- Mode: Single-player

Disney's Bonkers: Wax Up! is a 1995 platform video game developed by Al Baker & Associates, published by Sega and released in February 1995 for the Game Gear under the Sega Club brand. It is based on the animated television series Bonkers television series, and was exhibited in the Las Vegas Consumer Electronics Show. It was later ported to the Master System (only in Brazil) in 1998 and ported by Tec Toy.

== Plot ==
The toon cop Bonkers D. Bobcat goes on a mission to follow a trail that will take him to the casting factory where he has to rescue his partner Lucky Piquel and several toons that have encased as wax statues by the evil Madame Whosaid, who plans to open her own wax museum.

== Gameplay ==
The player has Bonkers making his way through a level to find and collect a certain number pickle clues and rescue any waxed toons, while dodging hazards and fighting enemies. Food items grant Bonkers health recovery, badges grant bonus points and Bonkers icons grant extra lives.

== Reception ==
Reception

Review scores
Publication	Score
Consoles +	85% (GG)
GamePro	3.1/5 (GG)
Video Games The Ultimate Gaming Magazine	6/10 (GG)
Le Geek Retrogaming	2/5 (SMS)

The Game Gear version of the game received average reviews at most. GamePro reviewer Scarry Larry found the graphics to be a mixed bag due to the sprite details and darkened layouts, but found the music to be repetitive and concluded the game was only good for Bonkers fans. A review on Video Games The Ultimate Gaming Magazine did not praise the graphics, audio or gameplay, but found them acceptable. Consoles + had complaints about the slowdowns. The Master System version did not meet up to reception of the handheld original. Retrogamer Le Geek stated that the game was only good for Tec Toy game collectors.
