= Bonkers (Genesis video game) =

1994 video game

- Developer: Sega Interactive Development Division
- Publisher: Sega
- Platform: Sega Genesis
- Release: NA: 1994; EU: February 10, 1995
- Genre: Action
- Mode: Single-player

Bonkers is a 1994 action video game developed by Sega Interactive Development Division and published by Sega for the Sega Genesis. It is based on the animated television series Bonkers, and was criticized for its gameplay.

== Gameplay ==
Bonkers is an action game played across four mini-games, each of them divided into 15 rounds which become increasingly difficult. After every three rounds, a password is given and a bonus game is played for the opportunity to gain an extra life. The game's storyline involves police officer Bonkers D. Bobcat taking part in an "officer of the month" competition, hoping to impress his partner Lucky once he returns from vacation. As Bonkers, the player is tasked with apprehending four criminals from the television series who each appear in their own mini-game, which can be played in any order.

- Harry the Handbag and his raccoon gang break into a museum to steal items, and the player must throw donuts at them to stop their heist. Enemies take cover behind pillars and can throw Bonkers' donuts back at him.
- The Rat is hiding at a junkyard, where the player must first deal with a garbage machine which attacks by throwing trash. The player's goal in each round is to avoid the trash while building up a brick wall, which blocks out the attacks.
- Mr. Big is planning to blow up a warehouse, and the player must move through a maze of crates and barrels to find Bonkers' friend, Fall-Apart Rabbit, who can deactivate the bomb. The player must find the pieces needed to assemble Fall-Apart Rabbit, while either avoiding rats or knocking crates into them.
- Ma Tow Truck and a gang of cars have taken over a freeway, and the player must run them off the road with the help of items dropped from a police helicopter.

== Reception ==
Reception

Review scores
Publication	Score
AllGame	3/5
Consoles +	85%
Computer and Video Games	59/100
Jeuxvideo.com	10/20
Mega Fun	50%
Player One	70%
VideoGames & Computer Entertainment	7/10
Games World: The Magazine	74/100
Mega	55%
Sega Magazine	68/100
Sega Power	59%
Sega Pro	74%

Bonkers was criticized for its gameplay, described as simplistic and repetitive, with little replay value. Mark Hill, writing for Sega Pro, praised the graphics and sound. However, he concluded, "It's fun at first and unique in many ways, but Bonkers can't rate too highly simply because of the repetitive and rather limited gameplay from one round to the next". Sega Power wrote, "If the engines involved in producing these sub-games had been used intelligently to create a single larger game with varied play, this might just have been a surprise hit". Computer and Video Games found the number of game modes limited.

In a later review for AllGame, Brett Alan Weiss wrote that each game mode "is challenging but simple in concept", and concluded, "Bonkers is not a great game, but it is a fun and harmless way to spend a few hours". In a 2010 review, Jeuxvideo.com stated that Bonkers fans would be disappointed by the game, writing that it could have benefitted from adjustments and more mini-games. The website praised the graphics but noted the limited amount of scenery, and found the music repetitive.
