= Gargoyles (video game) =

1995 video game

- Developers: Disney Interactive; Empty Clip Studios (Remastered)
- Publishers: Buena Vista Interactive; Disney Games (Remastered)
- Director: Bob Rademacher
- Producers: Patrick Gilmore; David Bergantino
- Designer: Joel Goodsell
- Programmer: Chris Shrigley
- Artist: Thom Ang
- Composers: Michael Giacchino; Patrick J. Collins
- Platform: Sega Genesis
- Release: NA: November 21, 1995
- Genre: Platform game
- Mode: Single-player

Gargoyles is a platform game developed by Disney Interactive and published by Buena Vista Interactive for the Sega Genesis in 1995 exclusively in North America. It is an adaptation of the Disney animated series of the same title.

== Gameplay ==
The game loosely follows the plot of the show. The player controls the protagonist Goliath as he seeks to put an end to the Eye of Odin, a corrupted magical talisman that can transform whoever comes to possess it. Demona, the most recent owner of the Eye, ultimately becomes the main antagonist. The game contains 5 levels bookended by short cinematics that explain the story thus far, each level concluding with a boss encounter.

Throughout the game, Goliath would contend with the Vikings who ransacked Castle Wyvern in the past, as well as new, robotic foes who attack him in the present era across various venues, such as Manhattan rooftops and a subway. His arsenal of attacks to defend himself includes various strikes with his fists, grapples, throws, and leaping maneuvers. He can also pump his wings once to increase his jumping distance and climb along walls and ceilings with his claws. Gargoyles boasts a hand-drawn appearance to Goliath, Demona, and the Viking enemies (not unlike Virgin's Aladdin also for the Genesis), but also a CGI-modeled look for the robot enemies.

== Release ==
The game was intended to be released exclusively for the Sega Genesis on May 15, 1995, but it ended up being released on November 21, 1995, and received reviews late in the year. A Super NES version planned for a Christmas 1995 release was cancelled. In December 2012, Chris Shrigley, who programmed the game, released the source code for educational purposes to the public.

During Disney D23 in 2022, an announcement trailer for a remastered version, developed by Empty Clip Studios and Disney Games, was released. A trailer released on September 7, 2023, which revealed a release date of October 19. It will have updated visuals, achievements, and enhancements to the gameplay. Limited Run Games has announced a remastered version of Gargoyles will be released physically Fall 2023 for Nintendo Switch, PlayStation 4, PlayStation 5, Xbox One and Xbox Series X/S.

== Reception ==
The game was very well received by most critics. Scott Larry from GamePro called it "one of the best games for the Genesis, right next to Earthworm Jim 2" and added: "Topnotch gameplay and great graphics made Gargoyles one of the year's best. It's a stone-cold blast!" Game Informer awarded it a score of 8.5/10, commenting: "Disney Interactive made Gargoyles into everything that would be expected from Disney's animation division. All the character movements look like a cartoon in themselves. If you found joy in Aladdin and The Lion King you'll probably receive the same thrill from Gargoyles but on a darker level". Mike Salmon of Game Players and Next Generation gave it four stars and 85% ratings respectively for its "simply amazing" graphics and being "a real treat to play", calling it one of the biggest surprises and best Genesis games of the year, and positively comparing it to "similar in looks" to Demon's Crest for the SNES, adding that "with this and Toy Story, Disney has done more with the Genesis than Sega has ever done". The four reviewers of Electronic Gaming Monthly were more conflicted about the game, giving it scores ranging from 4.0 to 7.5 out of 10. They all agreed that the game's controls were frustrating, but differed in their opinions of the gameplay and graphics (from "dingy" to "aren't the best" to "really impressive").
