= Chip 'n Dale: Rescue Rangers =

Chip 'n Dale: Rescue Rangers may refer to:

- Chip 'n Dale: Rescue Rangers (TV series), 1989 television series
- Chip 'n Dale: Rescue Rangers (film), 2022 film
- Chip 'n Dale Rescue Rangers (video game), 1990 game based on the TV series
- Chip 'n Dale Rescue Rangers 2, 1993 sequel to the 1990 game
- Chip 'n Dale Rescue Rangers: The Adventures in Nimnul's Castle, 1990 computer game
