= Earl (given name) =

- Gender: Male

Origin
- Origin: English
- Meaning: "warrior" or "nobleman"

Earl is an English given name, predominantly popular in North America, meaning "warrior" or "nobleman" and derived from the rank of nobility of the same name. Instances of its use as a given name date back to 12th-century England. Some of the holders of this name are:

- Earl Abell (1892–1956), American football player
- Earl E. Anderson (1919–2015), American general
- Earl Anthony (1938–2001), American professional bowler
- Earl Armstrong (1900–1986), Canadian politician
- Earl I. Anzai (1941–2023), American politician
- Earl Averill (1902–1983), professional baseball player
- Earl Edwin Austin, American criminal
- Earl Babbie (born 1938), American sociologist
- Earl Bakken (1924–2018), American inventor of the transistorized pacemaker
- Earl Balfour (1933–2018), Canadian professional ice hockey player
- Earl Balmer (1935–2019), American NASCAR Cup Series driver
- Earl Bamber (born 1990), Kiwi two-time winner of the 24 Hours of Le Mans
- Earl Banks (1924–1993), American football coach
- Earl Barish (born 1943), Canadian businessman
- Earl Barrett (born 1967), English former footballer
- Earl Barron (born 1981), American professional basketball player
- Earl Battey (1935–2003), American professional baseball player
- Earl Beecham (born 1965), American football player
- Earl Bell (born 1955), American retired pole vaulter
- Earl Bennett (born 1987), American football player
- Earl Best (1947–2021), American community organizer known as the 'Street Doctor'
- Earl Derr Biggers (1884–1933), American novelist and playwright
- Earl Billings (born 1945), American actor
- Earl Bird, fictional character in the comic strip Motley's Crew
- Earl Black (political scientist) (born 1942), American academic
- Earl Blaik (1897–1989), American football coach
- Earl Blumenauer (born 1948), American politician
- Earl Boen (1941–2023), American actor
- Earl Bostic (1913–1965), American saxophonist
- Earl Boykins (born 1976), American basketball player
- Earl K. Brent (1914–1977), American songwriter and composer
- Earl Broady (1904–1992), American police officer, attorney, and judge
- Earl Browder (1891–1973), American communist
- Earl Brown (coach) (1915–2003), American football and basketball player and coach
- Earl Brown (basketball, born 1952) (born 1952), Puerto Rican basketball player
- Earl Johnson (disambiguation), multiple people
- Earl Jolly Brown (1939–2006), American actor
- Earl Brydges (1905–1975), American politician
- Earl "Butch" Buchholz (born 1940), American tennis player
- Earl Butz (1909–2008), American politician
- Earl Caddock (1888–1950), American professional wrestler
- Earl Caldwell (born c. 1939), American journalist
- Earl Welton Caldwell (1905–1981), American baseball player
- Earl Camembert, fictional character in the TV series SCTV
- Earl Cameron (1915–2005), Canadian broadcaster
- Earl Cameron (1917–2020), British actor
- Earl Campbell (1900–1953), Canadian ice hockey player
- Earl Campbell (born 1955), American football player
- Earl Chudoff (1907–1993), American politician
- Earl "Dutch" Clark (1906–1978), American football player
- Earl Cochell (1922–2019), American tennis player
- Earl Cochran (born 1981), American football player
- Earl Cole (born 1971), American entrepreneur and television personality
- Earl Collier, American politician
- Earl Collins (1895–1958), Canadian politician
- Earl Conrad (1912–1986), American author
- Earl Cook (1908–1996), American baseball player
- Earl Cooper (1886–1965), American racecar driver
- Marion Earl Cooper (born 1957), American football player
- Earl Cranston (1840–1932), American bishop
- Earl Cureton (born 1957), American basketball player
- Earl Dawson (1925–1987), Canadian ice hockey executive and politician
- Earl Devore (1888–1928), American racecar driver
- Earl Dittman (born c. 1960), American film critic and publisher
- Earl Dodge (1932–2007), American politician
- Earl Doherty (born 1941), Canadian author
- Earl Dotson (born 1970), American football player
- Earl Douglas (radio), radio talk show producer
- Earl Durand (1913–1939), American mountain man
- Earl Duvall (1898–1969), American animator
- Earl Eby (1894–1970), American athlete
- Earl Edwards (disambiguation), multiple people
- Earl Ehrhart (born 1959), American politician
- Earl Hancock Ellis (1880–1923), U.S. Marine Corps officer
- Earl Emerson (born 1948), American novelist
- Earl Everett (born 1984), American football player
- Earl Faison (1939–2016), American football player
- Earl Kenneth Fernandes (born 1972), first Indian American Latin Rite Catholic bishop
- Earl Ferrell (born 1958), American football player
- Earl Gillespie (1922–2003), American sportscaster
- Earl Grant (musician) (1933–1970), American pianist
- Earl G. Graves, Sr. (1935–2020), American entrepreneur, publisher, businessman and philanthropist
- Earl G. Graves, Jr. (born 1962), American businessman and basketball player
- Earl Grinols (born 1951), American professor
- Earl Gros (1940–2013), American football player
- Earl Hamner Jr. (1923–2016), American writer and television producer
- Earl G. Harrison (1899–1955), American Dean of the University of Pennsylvania Law School; Commissioner of the United States Immigration and Naturalization Service, 1942–44
- Earl Hebner (born 1949), former WWE referee
- Earl Heikka (1910–1941), American sculptor
- Earl Hindman (1942–2003), American actor
- Earl Hilliard (born 1942), American politician
- Earl Hines (1903–1983), American jazz pianist
- Earl Gladstone Hunt Jr. (1918–2005), American Methodist pastor
- Earl Hutto (1926–2020), American politician
- Earl Jones (born 1964), American track and field athlete
- Earl Keeley (1936–1985), Canadian football player
- Earl Klugh (born 1953), American jazz guitarist
- Earl Floyd Kvamme (born 1938), American engineer
- Earl "Curly" Lambeau (1898–1965), founder of the Green Bay Packers
- Earl F. Landgrebe (1916–1986), American politician
- Earl C. Latourette (1889–1956), American judge
- Earl Levine (born 1968), American entrepreneur
- Earl Little (born 1973), American football player
- Earl Little Jr. (born 2003), American football player
- Earl Lovelace (born 1935), Trinidadian writer
- Earl McCarthy (born 1969), Irish freestyle swimmer
- Earl D. McIntyre, Canadian politician
- Earl C. Michener (1876–1957), American politician
- Earl R. Miller (born 1958), American diplomat
- Earl Monroe (born 1944), American basketball player
- Earl "Madman" Muntz (1914–1987), American merchandiser
- Earl Murray (1926–1994), American football player
- Earl Okine (born 1990), American football player
- Earl Pitts, fictional radio character
- Earl Edwin Pitts (born 1953), American spy
- Earl Read III, American politician
- Earl Sande (1898–1968), American Hall of Fame jockey and thoroughbred horse trainer
- Earl Scruggs (1924–2012), American banjo player
- Earl Simmons or DMX (1970–2021), American rapper and actor
- Earl Slipher (1883–1964), astronomer
- Earl Smith (1910s outfielder) (1891–1943), American baseball player
- Earl Smith (1950s outfielder) (1928–2014), American baseball player
- Earl Smith (catcher) (1897–1963), American baseball player
- Earl Smith (coach) (1917–2012), American football, basketball, and baseball coach
- Earl "Chinna" Smith (born 1955), Jamaican guitarist
- Earl E. T. Smith (1903–1991), American politician
- Earl "J. R." Smith (born 1985), American basketball player
- Earl Stevens (born 1967), American rapper better known as E-40
- Earl Stevens, Jr., E-40's son and producer better known as Droop-E
- Earl Sweatshirt (born 1994), American rapper and Odd Future member
- Earl Swensson (1930–2022), American architect
- Earl Taft (1931–2021), American mathematician
- Earl Thomas Conley (1941–2019), American country singer
- Earl Van Dorn (1820–1863), former U.S. Army officer
- Earl Wilbur Sutherland Jr. (1915–1974), American psychologist
- Earl Warren (1891–1974), former Chief Justice of the U.S. Supreme Court
- Earl Watson (born 1979), professional basketball player
- Earl Weaver (1930–2013), baseball manager of the Baltimore Orioles
- Earl Irvin West (1920–2011), American church historian
- Earl Wild (1915–2010), American pianist
- Earl Williams (basketball player), "the Twirl" (born 1951), American-Israeli professional basketball player
- Earl Williams (1970s catcher) (1948–2013), former major league baseball player
- Earl Wilson (1934–2005), former MLB pitcher
- Earl Woods (1932–2006), father of Tiger Woods
- Earl Young (architect) (1889–1975), American architect
- Earl Young (athlete) (born 1941), American sprinter
- Earl Young (drummer) (born 1940), American drummer
- James Earl Jones (1931–2024), American actor
- Wentworth Earl Miller (born 1972), American actor
- Roy Earl Parrish (1888–1918), American politician

== Fictional characters ==
- Earl, fictional character in the animated TV series Rocko's Modern Life
- Earl Hickey, fictional character in the TV series My Name Is Earl

== See also ==
- Earle (given name)
- Earlene (given name)
- Errol (disambiguation)
