= Erroll =

Erroll is an English male given name or surname that is synonymous to Earl. Notable people with the name include:

- Earl of Erroll, Scottish title
- Erroll Bennett (1950–2025), French/Tahitian footballer
- Erroll M. Brown (born 1950), first USCG African-American admiral
- Erroll Collins (1906–1991), British author
- Erroll Fraser (1950–2002), ice speed skater
- Erroll Garner (1923–1977), American jazz musician
- Erroll Chunder Sen (c. 1899 – after 1941), Indian pilot in the Royal Flying Corps during the First World War
- Frederick Erroll, 1st Baron Erroll of Hale (1914–2000), British Conservative politician

== See also ==
- Errol (disambiguation)
- Erol, a Turkish male given name
- Port Erroll
