= Errol =

Errol may refer to:

== People with the given name ==
- Errol Arendz (born 1953), South African fashion designer
- Errol Barnett (born 1983), anchor and correspondent for CBS News
- Errol Barrow (1920–1987), first Prime Minister of Barbados
- Errol Brown (1943–2015), British-Jamaican songwriter, lead singer of Hot Chocolate
- Errol Charles (born 1941), current Governor-General of Saint Lucia
- Errol Étienne (born 1941), prominent Scottish artist
- Errol Fuller (born 1947), English author on extinct animals
- Errol Flynn (1909–1959), Australian-American film actor in the 1930s, 1940s and 1950s
  - "Errol" (song), a 1981 song in honour of Flynn, on rock band Australian Crawl's album Sirocco
- Erroll Garner (1921–1971), American jazz pianist and composer of "Misty"
- Errol Gulden (born 2002), Australian rules footballer (Sydney Swans)
- Errol John (1924–1988), Trinidadian actor and playwright
- Errol Keen (1931-2015), Australian metalliser
- Errol Le Cain (1941–1989), British animator and illustrator
- Errol Lloyd (born 1943), Jamaican-born artist and writer
- Errol Mann (1941–2013), former American NFL placekicker, 1968–1978
- Errol Morris (born 1948), American filmmaker and writer
- Errol Musk (born 1946), South African engineer and father of Elon Musk
- Errol Sawyer (1943–2020), American photographer
- Errol Spence Jr. (born 1990), American professional boxer and world champion
- Errol Tobias (born 1950), South African rugby union player
- Errol Zimmerman (born 1986), Surinamese-Curaçaoan kickboxer

== Fictional characters ==
- Errol (Harry Potter), the Weasley family's owl in the fictional Harry Potter series
- Errol, a swamp dragon in the Discworld novel Guards! Guards!
- Errol, a character in the film Snatch
- Errol, a character in the Chip 'n Dale Rescue Rangers episode "Love is a Many Splintered Thing"
- Errol (originally spelt as Erol), an antagonist in Jak II and the main antagonist in Jak 3
- Errol the Hamster, a British puppet that is often seen in many productions featuring Roland Rat
- Errol, a character in the video game Fields of Mistria

== Places ==
- Errol, Perth and Kinross, a village in Scotland
- Errol, New Hampshire, a town in the United States

== Other uses ==
- Errol (album), an album by American rapper Haleek Maul
- List of storms named Errol, a list of tropical cyclones named Errol

== See also ==
- Erroll
- Eryl, a Welsh given name
- Earl (given name)
- Earle (given name)
- Erol, a Turkish male given name
