= Voplex building =

Office building in Perinton, New York

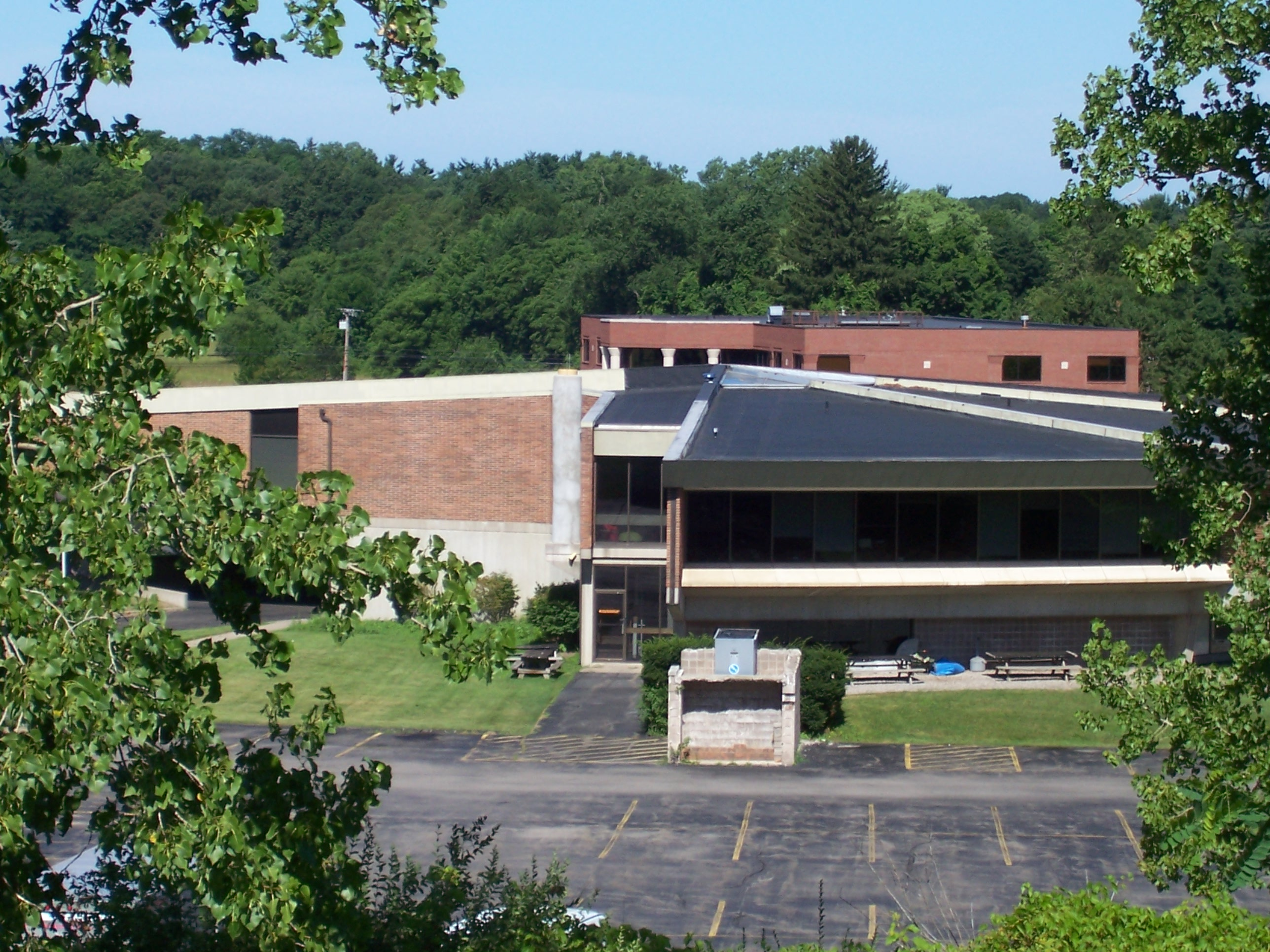

- Location within New York

General information
- Location: 1100 Pittsford-Victor Road; Pittsford, NY 14534, Perinton, New York, United States
- Coordinates: 43.049133°N 77.466576°W
- Current tenants: NimbleUser, Synoptek
- Owner: James Salviski
- Landlord: James Salviski

Technical details
- Floor count: 2
- Lifts/elevators: 0

Design and construction
- Architect: Carlton DeWolff

The Voplex building is a remarkable office building located in Perinton, New York close to Interstate 490 approaching the city of Rochester, New York from the east. The name is a local one, not formally conferred on the building. Instead it refers to the fact that the building was designed for and initially occupied by Voplex Corporation, a supplier of automotive custom plastic products such as interior trim. A sign with the name "Voplex" in large letters was visible for quite a distance, and the name stuck. RochesterColo.com and Foundry Digital now occupy the building, and the building is part of the three building office complex officially called the Basin Tech Centre on Pittsford-Victor Road. Coincidentally, it is within a quarter mile of the Mushroom House, another notable piece of local architecture, but one not visible from a distance, being located in woods.

Another office building, located in Canandaigua, New York, is also a former Voplex location, and is likewise known as the "Voplex building". However it is of conventional design.

== Views of the building ==
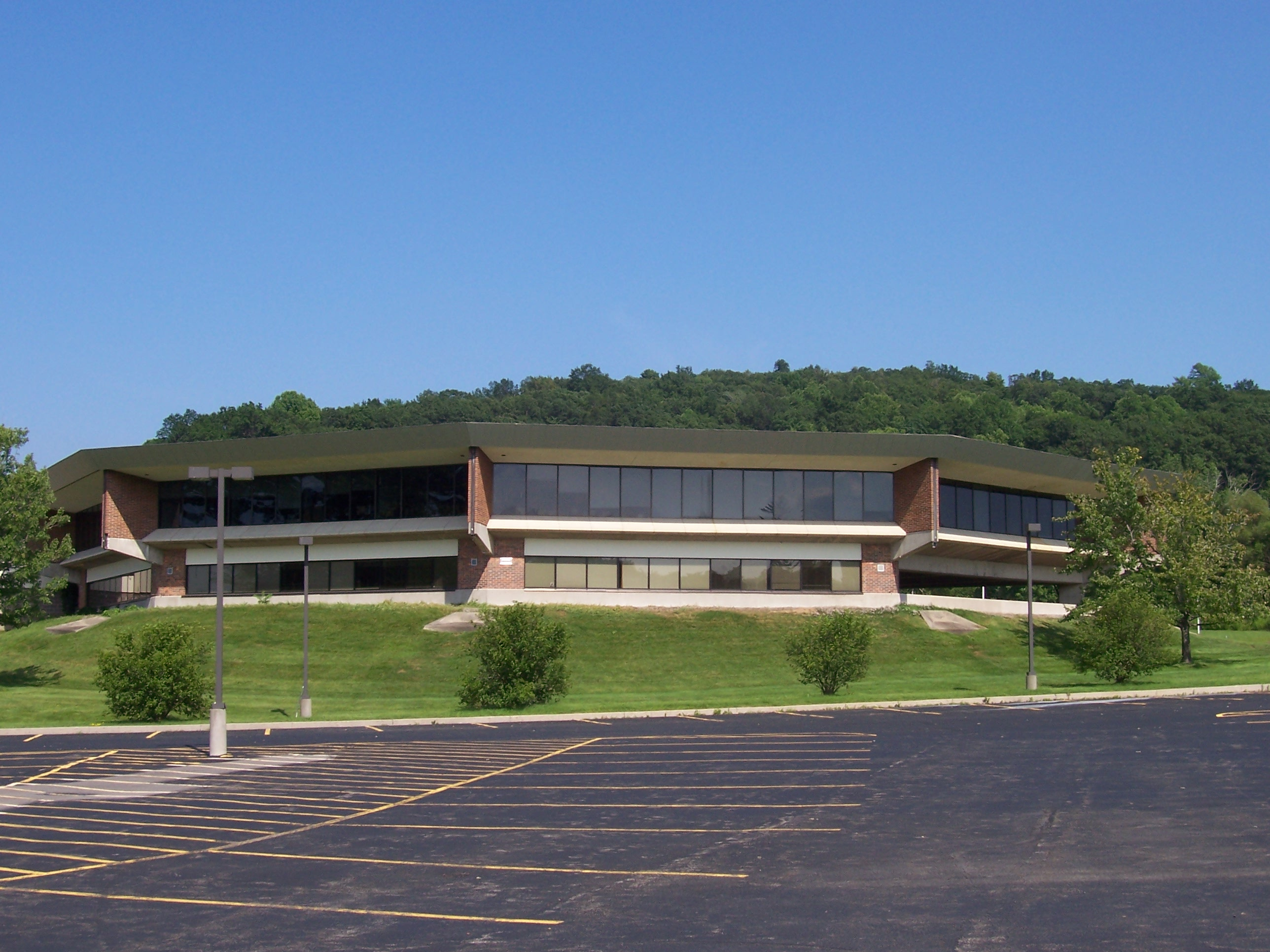
Southwest side

Passing moderately high around a hill, the I-490 highway gives a fine view of the city in the distance with the Voplex building in the near foreground, below the road. From this vantage, one can see the shape of the building as a decagonal, lenticular shape raised up on a much smaller rectangular base. Three segments of the decagon are missing on the south side, forming the main entrance.

The building has been likened to a large pie with a section cut out, a flying saucer, the Crunchwrap Supreme, and the Millennium Falcon. It was designed by the architect Carlton DeWolff, founder of the nationally recognized firm of DeWolff Partnership Architects LLP. Other designs in his portfolio include the International Museum of Photography at the George Eastman House, and the Blue Cross Arena in Rochester.

== Recent history ==
1995 - The building was acquired by Ray Hutch, founder of Western New York Computing Systems / Synergy Global Solutions. Ray converted the 1st floor covered parking to office space, and added a 6,000-square-foot (560 m^{2}) warehouse on the north side of the building.

2008 - The building was purchased by James Salviski, founder of LogicalSolutions.net and began undergoing a complete renovation (expected to be complete in late 2009). The existing warehouse was converted to a Tier4 data center, and the facility became the new headquarters for LogicalSolutions.net, a software, website design, hosting and Data Center management firm.

2009 - With much of the data center and interior renovation complete, a significant effort to clean up the grounds is underway. People traveling on 490, especially Eastbound travelers, will notice the cleanup of trees and other overgrowth.

2013 - Building is now occupied by EarthLink Business, housing both a data center, a sales team, and support functions.

2015 - NimbleUser, a software development firm, now occupies the second floor, sharing tenancy with EarthLink Business.

2016 - Synoptek acquired EarthLink’s IT Services business.

2022 - NimbleUser moves out, giving way to Foundry Digital on the 2nd floor with the 1st floor reserved for Data Center operations.

2025 - Led by James Salviski who built the Data Center in 2008, RochesterColo.com is born and acquires the Data Center colocation business back from Synoptek.
