= Earl Young =

Earl Young may refer to:

- Earl Young (athlete) (born 1941), former American athlete
- Earl Young (architect) (1889–1975), American architect, realtor and insurance agent
- Earl Young (drummer) (born 1940), Philadelphia-based drummer
