= Heikka =

Heikka is a Finnish surname. Notable people with the surname include:

- Earl Heikka (1910–1941), American sculptor of figurines
- Mikko Heikka (born 1944), Finnish Lutheran bishop

== See also ==
- Heikki
