= Earle (given name) =

Earle is an English given name, and may refer to:

- Earle Bergey (1901–1952), American illustrator
- Earle Birney (1904–1995), Canadian poet; recipient of the Governor General's Award for Literature
- Earle Brown (1926–2002), American composer
- Earle Bruce (1931-2018), former American college football coach
- Earle Childs (1893–1918), American soldier who died during World War I
- Earle Combs (1899–1976), American Major League Baseball player
- Earle Hagen (1919-2008), American composer
- Earle Hyman (1926-2017), American actor
- Earle Labor (1928-2022), American historian; biographer of Jack London
- Earle Bradford Mayfield (1881–1964), American politician; United States Senator
- Earle "Greasy" Neale (1891-1973), American football & baseball player & coach
- Earle Nelson (1897-1928), American serial killer, rapist, and necrophile
- Earle Ovington (1879–1936), American aeronautical engineer, aviator and inventor; "Official Air Mail Pilot #1"
- Earle Page (1880–1961), Eleventh Prime Minister of Australia
- Earle Swensen (died 1996), American businessman
- Earle S. Warner (1880–1971), New York politician and judge

== See also ==
- Earl (given name)
- Earlene (given name)
- Errol (disambiguation)
