= Earl Johnson =

Earl Johnson may refer to:

- Earl Johnson (American football), head college football coach at Doane College
- Earl Johnson (baseball) (1919–1994), Major League Baseball and World War II hero
- Earl Johnson (fiddler) (1886–1965), fiddler in 1920s North Georgia
- Earl Johnson (runner) (1891–1965), cross-country athlete, winner of two medals in 1924
- Earl Johnson, American musician better known as Earl St. Clair
- Earl Johnson, guitarist in the band Moxy
- Earl Zero (Earl Anthony Johnson, born 1953), Jamaican reggae singer
- Earl Johnson (ice hockey) (1931–2015), National Hockey League player
- Earl M. Johnson (1928–1988), Jacksonville, Florida civil rights leader
- Earl V. Johnson (1913–1942), U.S. Navy officer
- Earl D. Johnson (1905–1990), U.S. Under Secretary of the Army, 1952–54
- Earl F. Johnson (1868–1947), Michigan politician
- Earl "Presto" Johnson (died 2009), American vaudevillian-styled magician
- USS Earl V. Johnson
