= Earlene =

- Gender: Female

Origin
- Origin: Old English; possibly Irish Gaelic
- Meaning: Noblewoman (English); Pledge (Irish)

Other names
- Related names: Earline; Earleen; Earlena; Erlean; Erleen; Earla; Earley; Earlie; Erlinda; Eyrlene

Earlene is a given name, the feminine equivalent of the name Earl. Both names derive from Old English term eorl, meaning "nobleman" or "chieftain". The name may also be related to the Irish Gaelic names Arleen and Arlene, which mean "the pledge".

Variant spellings of this name include Earline, Earleen, Earlena, Erlean, and Erleen. Related names include Earla, Earley, Earlie and Erlinda.

People with the given name include:

- Earlene Brown (1935–1983), American shot putter, discus thrower and roller skater
- Earlene Fowler (born 1954), American author
- Earlene Hill Hooper (born 1938 or 1939), American politician
- Earlene Risinger (1927–2008), All-American Girls Professional Baseball League pitcher
- Earlene Roberts (1935–2013), American politician
