= Voplex =

American company

Voplex Corporation was a company founded in Rochester, New York as Vogt Manufacturing and Coach Lace Company in the late 19th or early 20th century. The name was changed to Voplex, from "Vogt" and "plastic" in the 1970s, the company having been in the business of supplying custom plastic products to the automotive industry for some time. It later relocated to the metropolitan area of Detroit, Michigan.

== History ==
The company appears to have gone into bankruptcy in 1991, reorganized, and sold off some product lines. In 1993 it was bought by Cambridge Industries, Inc, which in turn has been absorbed by Meridian Automotive Systems.

An unusually shaped building on the east side of Rochester, easily visible from the I-490 highway, is still known locally as the Voplex building despite having been vacated by the company since the late 1980s. The building is currently owned by LogicalSolutions.net.
