= Erroll Collins =

British writer

- Edith Hannah Redknap aka Erroll Collins
- Born: Ellen Edith Hannah Redknap; 15 April 1906; Shadwell, London, England
- Died: 11 March 1991 (aged 84); Isleworth, London, England
- Other names: Edith Hannah Redknap, Clyde Marfax, Auntie Goody, Erroll Collins, Graeme Grant
- Occupations: Writer, and Poet
- Known for: Writing Boys Science Fiction

Erroll Collins (pseudonym of Ellen Edith Hannah Redknap, 15 April 1906 – 11 March 1991) was a British writer active during the 1940s, specialising in adventure and science fiction for boys. Ellen Redknap wrote under several other names.

== Life ==
Collins was born Ellen Edith Hannah Redknap in 1906 in Shadwell, London, the eldest of four children and daughter of Frederick Redknap (1887–1950), a master-plumber. As a child she set such a good example to her younger siblings, she was called "Goody Two Shoes" and as such by many in the family, in the last years of her life, she was known and addressed as Auntie Goody. As a child she had been an excellent pianist, but never played again after the death of her mother in 1934. She went to St. Mary's College on the Twickenham Road (possibly now known as Gumley school) where even then she wanted to write. She also enjoyed painting in watercolours occasionally. She was a keen breeder of terrapins and would often have one in her apron as she went about the housework. She had a very broad general knowledge and read a great deal, after she died one room was almost impossible to enter due to there being more than two thousand books packed floor to ceiling.

Redknap never married. Instead she took on the role of looking after her younger siblings and father, after her mother died and then later she looked after her brother Earnest. He had had a notable war record enlisting in the army in 1939 and becoming a commando, taking part in the 1940 raid on the Lofoten Islands. Later he became a glider and small plane pilot in the Glider Pilot Regiment being discharged after the war with the rank of Staff Sergeant. He then worked in research for the Paint Research Association. He died in 1979 and his sister lived on until 1991 dying alone in her home in Isleworth on 11 March.

=== Writing ===
Ellen Redknap wrote under several names, mainly Erroll Collins. One book by her was published under the name Greame Grant Hawkins (to celebrate her nephew's birth) and possibly she also wrote under the name Clyde Marfax.

Her 1944 Mariners of Space is for its time a very advanced piece of science fiction. It envisages a future world where there were populations on Mars and Venus as well as Earth flying around the Solar System, and, inevitably, getting into wars. As it was serialised in the then popular Boy's Own Paper it was read widely and must have influenced many boys of that generation to take an interest in the possibility of space travel. To some extent it anticipates the later work of Robert A. Heinlein, though it is clearly just aimed at boys. It was published by Lutterworth Press in hardback in 1949.

Mariners of Space also anticipates a number of political realignments, some of which have actually come true. The book predicts a 'United States of Europe' not dissimilar to the EU, although the British Empire and the United States have merged to become the 'British-American Empire'! Nonetheless, Collins correctly anticipates that the world's major trouble-spots at the millennium would be in the Middle East (she posits a dispute between Europe and Asia over the territorial rights to the Caspian Sea). In the Interplanetary War which forms the climax to the story, Earth is victorious largely due to the population uniting against their common enemies from Mars and Venus.

She predicted 28 years earlier the landing area for the Apollo missions and in local newspaper article said "I picked the Sea of Tranquility because it seemed the most likely spot to land. It's central, and flat. But it was just a guess."

Other books include Submarine City, The Black Dwarf of Mongolia, Outlaw Squadron, The Hawk of Aurania, Volcanic Treasure Rebel Wings, The Secret of Rosmerstrand and The Sea Falcon.

During the Second World War one of her books was refused printing permission by the Censors on the grounds of National Security, perhaps the fiction was a little to close to reality of things being secretly developed.

In The Secret of Rosrnerstrand, 1941, Redknap also made a guess about what the German Army was up to on the sea bed. In this novel, described by the publisher as a prophetic, thrilling, ominous tale of modern warfare, the Nazis develop an under-water base from which submarines and troop carriers fitted onto tractors prepare for a sea-bed invasion of Britain. Even she was surprised when in 1957, when vast quantities of captured Nazi documents were published and it was revealed that they had just such a project on the drawing board.

It appears that she was possibly an acquaintance of Barnes Wallis - the use of swing-wing Arrow-Planes in 'Mariners of Space' may have had their origin in this association.

She worked as a personal assistant to MacDonald Hastings when a journalist at Picture Post and Bernard Weatherill's father.

In later life, poetry formed the majority of her work and she had many verses published both in local group publications and in her own right. She was also keen to help others and gave much advice to budding poets and writers as well as working occasionally as a sub-editor.

== Works ==
Novels as E. E. H. Redknap

- The Isle of the Black Pearl. London, George Newnes, (Flag Library for Boys 11), 1935.

Novels as Erroll Collins

- Galleons of the Air (serial, Boy's Own Paper, 1939). Lutterworth Press, Jul 1940.
- The Sea Falcon (serial, Boy's Own Paper, Oct 1940-Mar 1941). Lutterworth Press, Dec 1941.
- The Secret of Rosmerstrand. Lutterworth Press, May 1942.
- Outlaw Squadron. Lutterworth Press, Oct 1943.
- Mariners of Space. Lutterworth Press, Jul 1944.
- The Hawk of Aurania. London, Collins, 1944.
- Rebel Wings. Lutterworth Press, Apr 1945.
- Submarine City. Lutterworth Press, Nov 1946.
- The Stars of Korania. Lutterworth Press, Nov 1948.
- The Black Dwarf of Mongolia. Collins (Seagull Library), May 1949.
- Volcanic Treasure. London, Gerald Swan, Feb 1955.
- Conquerors of Space. Richmond, Surrey, Stanley Baker (FST #5), Jun 1955.
- Wings of Resistance. Mitcham, Surrey, G.M. Smith (Combat Library #1), Mar 1959.

Verse as Ellen E. H. Collins

- The Star Rover. A poem. Ilfracombe, Arthur H. Stockwell, 1953.
- Poems of Earth, Sea and Sky. Hounslow, privately published, 1959.
- More Poems of Earth, Sea and Sky. Hounslow, privately published, 1960.
- Astrology, and other poems. Dulwich Village, Outposts Publications, 1961.
- Impressions. Cheltenham, Envoi, 1961.
- Poems for All Seasons. Southend-on-Sea, Citizen Publishing Co., 1961.
- Strange Altars. [7 The Towers], Stevenage, Herts., Ore Publications, 1973.
- Un-Cuddly Creatures. Bedford, Writers' Own Publications, 1989.

Novels as Graeme Grant

- Wings Over the Arctic. London, Evans Bros., 1947.

Novels as Clyde Marfax

- Planets of Peril

Short Stories & Serials

Stories as E. E. H. Redknap

- Beaver Gold (Schoolboy Adventures 1, Feb 1944; reprinted, Cute Fun, May 1950)

Stories as Erroll Collins

- The Luck of the Lindsays (Boy's Own Paper, Jan 1936)
- The Tiki of Tautauro (Boy's Own Paper, May 1936; reprinted, The Schoolboy's Annual, Lutterworth, n.d.)
- The Sunstone (Jolly Jack's Annual 1937, 1936)
- The Grey Druid (Boy's Own Paper, Jan 1937)
- The Haunted Reef (Boy's Own Paper, Mar 1937)
- Deaths Door ( Boys Own Paper, Feb 1937 )
- The Dare-Devil Pilot (Boy's Own Paper, Jul 1938)
- Galleons of the Air (Boy's Own Paper, 1939)
- The Sea Falcon (Boy's Own Paper, Oct 1940-Mar 1941)
- The Lost Lake (Schoolboy Adventures 1, Feb 1944)
- The Silver Joss (Schoolboy Adventures 1, Feb 1944)
- Red for Danger (Cute Fun, Aug 1946)
- M13 (The Schoolboy's Annual, Lutterworth, n.d.)
- Bandits and Bisnagas (Daily Mail Boy's Annual, n.d.)
