= Chip 'n Dale Rescue Rangers (video game) =

1990 video game

Chip 'n Dale: Rescue Rangers
- Developer: Capcom
- Publishers: Capcom; Nintendo (arcade)
- Producers: Tokuro Fujiwara; Darlene Waddington
- Designer: Masayoshi Kurokawa
- Artist: Keiji Inafune
- Composer: Harumi Fujita
- Platforms: Nintendo Entertainment System, arcade
- Release: NA: March 8, 1990; JP: June 8, 1990; EU: December 12, 1991; Arcade; 1990
- Genre: Platform
- Modes: Single-player, multiplayer
- Arcade system: PlayChoice-10

Chip 'n Dale Rescue Rangers (Note: Japanese: チップとデールの大作戦, Hepburn: Chippu to Dēru no Daisakusen; lit. Chip 'n Dale's Mission) is a platform video game developed and published by Capcom for the Nintendo Entertainment System. It is based on the Disney animated series of the same name. It was released in North America and Japan in 1990, and Europe in 1991. An arcade version was released by Nintendo in 1990. It sold approximately 1.2 million copies worldwide.

The game was included in The Disney Afternoon Collection compilation for PlayStation 4, Windows, and Xbox One released in April 2017.

== Gameplay ==
Chip 'n Dale Rescue Rangers is a platform game featuring single and 2-player cooperative modes, allowing players to choose which levels to access via a map of various locations throughout the city. Each individual stage is set up as a side-scrolling action game where Chip and Dale can walk, jump, duck, and pick up objects such as acorns, crates, barrels, and balls to throw at enemies and bosses. Each character can withstand only three direct hits before they lose a life, and there are no passwords. In two-player mode, Controller 1 is Chip, Controller 2 is Dale.

The rest of the Rescue Rangers also appear to support Chip and Dale. Monterey Jack will occasionally appear to break down certain barricades, while Zipper grants temporary invincibility to the player when found. Gadget, though in Fat Cat's captivity, provides tips and advice for the chipmunks in each stage.

== Plot ==
The Rescue Rangers are going on a mission to retrieve a missing kitten for a girl named Mandy. As Gadget goes on ahead to scout the area and Monterey Jack is sent to investigate sightings of strange mechanical dogs with Zipper, Chip and Dale proceed through the streets and into a laboratory, where they are attacked by a crazed robot.

After defeating the robot, Fat Cat appears and reveals that "Mandy's kitten" was just a distraction so he could kidnap Gadget and force her to work for him. Fortunately, Gadget is able to contact Chip and Dale by building a wireless phone and sending a map to them via carrier pigeon, allowing them to navigate through the treacherous landscape and reach Fat Cat's casino where she is being held. After rescuing her, Gadget provides the chipmunks with a rocket that sends them towards Fat Cat's hideout so they can defeat him.

== Development ==
Rescue Rangers was the second Capcom-developed Disney game after 1989's DuckTales, also for the Nintendo Entertainment System. It was produced by Tokuro Fujiwara, who had previously worked on titles such as Ghosts'n Goblins. According to then-Disney game producer Darlene Lacey, the title was one of the "least troublesome" Capcom projects to meet the company's family-friendly ethics standards, with very few changes made during development. The Japanese and European versions of the game contain fixes to minor graphical glitches during the opening cutscene seen in the North American release, and a leaked prototype cartridge from a private collector reveals that at one time the player was only required to collect half as many flowers and stars to gain extra lives, though the original amounts were still erroneously printed in the North American instruction manual.

== Reception ==
Reception

Review scores
Publication	Score
Electronic Gaming Monthly	7/10, 9/10, 7/10, 8/10
Nintendo Power	4 / 5
Mean Machines	88%
Total!	81%

Rescue Rangers proved to be a commercial success, selling approximately 1.2 million copies worldwide, becoming Capcom's fourth highest-selling game for the Nintendo Entertainment System. It met with a mostly positive response upon its release in North America, with Electronic Gaming Monthly finding that "like previous Disney titles for the NES, this Capcom game offers the best graphics and game play for both young and old players alike", praising the title's 2-player option and "cartoon" visuals. The magazine criticized the title's lack of difficulty, saying "like the other Disney games, Capcom has hurt a great cart by making it too easy", calling the game "a great package that ends too quickly". Conversely, European Mean Machines magazine called it "tough and enjoyable", and said "what sets Rescue Rangers apart from other NES platformers is the speed of gameplay and the level of challenge". The game received the Parents' Choice Foundation's 1990 Parents' Choice Award for video games that November.

Nintendo Power ranked Rescue Rangers 79th in their 1997 list of the top 100 greatest games released for Nintendo systems, saying "Capcom lived up to its reputation for superior play control and graphics". In 2009, website IGN placed the game 71st on their list of the 100 greatest NES games of all time, with editors remarking that the title may have been more linear than Capcom's earlier title DuckTales, but it was nonetheless "an addictive platforming masterpiece". That year, GamesRadar ranked the game sixth on their list of the seven best Disney games, saying Rescue Rangers was "still worth playing" nearly 20 years after its original release.

== Sequel ==
Capcom released a sequel in December 1993 titled Chip 'n Dale Rescue Rangers 2, also for the Nintendo Entertainment System. The title has similar graphics and gameplay, as well as additional incentives for cooperative play such as mini-games that can only be played by two players and the ability to throw one's partner as a weapon.

== See also ==
- List of Disney video games
