= Earlene Fowler =

American novelist

- Born: 1954 (age 71–72); California, U.S.
- Occupation: Novelist
- Spouse: Allen
- Writing career
- Genre: Mystery
- Notable awards: Agatha Award; 1999 Best Novel – Mariner's Compass; Nominated for Agatha Award; 2006 Best Novel – The Saddlemaker's Wife
- Website: www.earlenefowler.com

Earlene Fowler (born 1954) is an American novelist and the author of a number of mystery novels set in the fictional Californian city of San Celina. She was raised in La Puente, California.

Earlene has written 15 books in the Benni Harper series of mysteries. The sixth book, Mariner's Compass, won the Agatha Award for Best Novel in 1999. The lead character, Benni Harper, is curator of a folk art museum and quilting figures prominently in many of the storylines. Each book in the series has been given the name of a traditional quilt block pattern. Recurring characters include Police Chief Gabe Ortiz, Benni's friend Elvia Aragon, Grandma Dove, Aunt Garnet, and cousin Emory.

San Celina is a fictionalized and slightly modified version of San Luis Obispo, California. The books include many local landmarks and recognizable places from throughout San Luis Obispo County, although many of the names have been altered slightly. The name "San Celina" is improper Spanish (improper gender agreement between the subject and article) and was meant as a joke, but is now a decision the author regrets due to the large number of letters she receives about it.

In November, 2004 Benni Harper's Quilt Album was published. Co-written with Margrit Hall, this book features quilt patterns inspired by early books in the series. The book includes photographs and new stories to fill in some missing plot details from the book series.

Earlene was a short story writer for more than ten years before her first novel was published. Writing classes at Orange Coast College in Costa Mesa, California led to the submission of her first book to a publisher. Within a week, a three-book contract was signed.

The Saddlemaker's Wife, not a part of the Benni Harper series, was nominated for the 2006 Agatha Award for Best Novel. Ms. Fowler was nominated along with authors Nancy Pickard (winner), L. C. Hayden, Julia Spencer-Fleming, and Jacqueline Winspear.

== Bibliography ==
Benni Harper Mysteries

- Fool's Puzzle (1994) ISBN 978-0-425-14545-6
- Irish Chain (1995) ISBN 978-0-425-15137-2
- Kansas Troubles (1996) ISBN 978-0-425-15696-4
- Goose in the Pond (1997) ISBN 978-0-425-16239-2
- Dove in the Window (1998) ISBN 978-0-425-16894-3
- Mariner's Compass (1999) ISBN 978-0-425-17408-1
- Seven Sisters (2000) ISBN 978-0-425-17917-8
- Arkansas Traveler (2001) ISBN 978-0-425-18428-8
- Steps to the Altar (2002) ISBN 978-0-425-18944-3
- Sunshine and Shadow (2003) ISBN 978-0-425-19528-4
- Broken Dishes (2004) ISBN 978-0-425-20197-8
- Delectable Mountains (2005) ISBN 978-0-425-20652-2
- Tumbling Blocks (2007) ISBN 978-0-425-22123-5
- State Fair (2010) ISBN 978-0-425-23422-8
- Spider Web (2011) ISBN 978-0-425-24098-4

Ruby McGavin series

- The Saddlemaker's Wife (2006) ISBN 978-0-425-21578-4
- The Road to Cardinal Valley (2011)

Other works

- Love Mercy (2009) ISBN 978-0-425-22597-4, connected with Benny Harper Mysteries
