= List of Chip 'n Dale: Rescue Rangers episodes =

Chip 'n Dale: Rescue Rangers is an American animated television series produced by Walt Disney Television Animation. Created by Tad Stones and Alan Zaslove, it featured the established Disney characters Chip 'n' Dale in a new setting. The series premiered on The Disney Channel on March 4, 1989, having aired the first produced episode, "Catteries Not Included", as a special preview on August 27, 1988.

A two-hour movie presentation of Rescue Rangers to the Rescue began airing in syndication the weekend of September 29, 1989. While not produced first, the movie told the story of how the Rescue Rangers met.

The series then began airing in weekday syndication. From that point forward, the movie was broken up into five standard-length episodes that were considered part of season 2. In 1990, it became part of the syndicated programming block The Disney Afternoon. The final episode aired on November 19, 1990. As a part of the Disney Afternoon lineup, reruns of the show were aired until September 3, 1993.

In the fall of 1990, a live-action educational film/video was made entitled The Great Quake Hazard Hunt, in which Rescue Rangers Chip and Dale, along with their friends, show children how to prepare for earthquakes (the characters were portrayed in their live forms that appear in the Disney theme parks and other live appearances).

In the fall of 1991, another live-action educational film/video was made entitled Rescue Rangers: Fire Safety Adventure, in which Rescue Rangers Chip and Dale, along with their friends, must foil the plans of Fat Cat as he leaves a trail of fire hazards throughout the fire station and neighboring bank.

== Series overview ==
Season	Episodes	Originally released		
Season	Episodes	First released	Last released	Network
1	13	March 4, 1989	May 21, 1989	The Disney Channel
2	47	September 11, 1989	May 2, 1990	Syndication
3	5	September 10, 1990	November 19, 1990	Syndication

== Episodes ==
=== Season 1 (1989) ===
No. overall	No. in season	Title	Directed by	Written by	Villain(s)	Original release date	Prod. code
1	1	"Piratsy Under the Seas"	John Kimball & Bob Zamboni	Mark Edens	The Pi-rats and Billy the Squid	March 4, 1989	4303-004
The Rescue Rangers discover a sunken pirate ship and a huge cargo of gold, along with a crew of pirate rats who have forgotten about life above the surface.
2	2	"Catteries Not Included"	John Kimball & Bob Zamboni	Story by : Tad Stones; Teleplay by : Bruce Talkington	Norton Nimnul	March 5, 1989	4303-001
A little girl (known as Mandy) is looking for her kitten, Spunky, and the Rescue Rangers are on the case. The trail leads to Nimnul's laboratory, where the professor is kidnapping cats and using them to generate lightning bolts by building up a charge of static electricity in their fur. Note: This episode marks the first appearance of Professor Nimnul.
3	3	"Dale Beside Himself"	John Kimball & Bob Zamboni	Dev Ross	Fleeblebrox aliens	March 12, 1989	4303-012
A trio of shape-changing aliens from the planet Fleeblebrox are vacationing on Earth. When it's time to leave, one of them, Ditz, decides to remain behind by tricking Dale into switching places with him.
4	4	"Flash the Wonder Dog"	John Kimball & Bob Zamboni	Story by : Buzz Dixon; Teleplay by : Buzz Dixon & David Wise	Fat Cat	March 19, 1989	4303-006
To bring down beloved television star Flash the Wonder Dog, Fat Cat and his henchmen dress up in his costume and perform random acts of badness. Soon, the town is buzzing with bad vibes for Flash and the studio is replacing the canine with his cockatoo sidekick named Conrad. Meanwhile, Dale gets a sobering meeting with his TV hero and finds that Flash isn't as brave as he thought he was in real life. Note: This episode marked the first appearances of Fat Cat and his gang.
5	5	"Out to Launch"	John Kimball & Bob Zamboni	Mark Edens	N/A	March 26, 1989	4303-011
The Rangers go to watch the launch of a space plane, but unfortunately Chip and Dale get trapped in a spacesuit in orbit, forcing the other Rangers to attempt a launch of their own.
6	6	"Kiwi's Big Adventure"	John Kimball & Bob Zamboni	Julia J. Roberts	The Crocodile	April 2, 1989	4303-013
The Rangers lose the Ranger Plane to a tribe of kiwi birds. In their attempt to get it back, Dale pretends to have broken his toe to receive affection from Gadget.
7	7	"Adventures in Squirrelsitting"	John Kimball & Bob Zamboni	Dev Ross & Tad Stones	Fat Cat	April 9, 1989	4303-005
While trying to recover a stolen statuette – the Maltese Mouse – from Fat Cat, the Rescue Rangers accidentally wreak havoc in the home of a squirrel with two daughters. While the mother repairs the damage, the Rangers take care of the girls. The eldest, Tammy, develops a crush on Chip. She decides to prove herself to her new hero by sneaking into Fat Cat's hideout and recovering the priceless statuette herself.
8	8	"Pound of the Baskervilles" "The Pound of the Baskervilles"	John Kimball & Bob Zamboni	Eric Lewald	Lord Howie	April 16, 1989	4303-007
MacDuff enlists the Rescue Rangers, with a little help from Sureluck Jones, (a parody of the fictional sleuth, Sherlock Holmes) a fictional sleuth whom Chip admires from a series of books he reads to find the will that proves the old family mansion rightfully belongs to his master, Roger.
9	9	"Risky Beesness"	John Kimball & Bob Zamboni	Story by : Tad Stones & David Wise; Teleplay by : Linda Woolverton	Irwina Allen	April 23, 1989	4303-009
Irwina Allen, a scientist and rockstar wannabe uses her control of bees to steal a swarm and plot her takeover of the world of rock and roll. The queen bee appeals to Zipper and the other Rangers for help, during which Zipper falls in love with her and is trying to win her affection.
10	10	"Three Men and a Booby"	John Kimball & Bob Zamboni	Eric Lewald	Mr Dumpty	April 30, 1989	4303-002
A mad egg collector attempts to collect the egg of a mother Booby Bird, and the rangers attempt to help reunite her with her baby.
11	11	"The Carpetsnaggers"	John Kimball & Bob Zamboni	Somtow Sucharikul	Norton Nimnul	May 7, 1989	4303-003
The homes of the wealthy are being robbed by flying carpets under the control of Professor Nimnul.
12	12	"Bearing Up Baby"	John Kimball & Bob Zamboni	Dev Ross	Lion and Campers	May 14, 1989	4303-010
While on a camping trip, the Rangers find themselves watching over a little boy named Jeremy, who's also being watched over by a friendly Humphrey the Bear, who quickly discovers that he might have gotten more than he bargained for.
13	13	"Parental Discretion Retired"	John Kimball & Bob Zamboni	Mark Edens	Fat Cat	May 21, 1989	4303-008
Monty's father Cheddarhead Charlie comes to visit, and tries to help the Rangers stop Fat Cat's latest scheme, but his rash way of doing things are only getting in the way.

=== Season 2 (1989–90) ===
No. overall	No. in season	Title	Directed by	Written by	Villain(s)	Original release date	Prod. code
14–18	1–5	"Rescue Rangers to the Rescue"	John Kimball, Bob Zamboni, Rick Leon & Jamie Mitchell	Kevin Hopps & Tad Stones	Aldrin Klordane, Fat Cat, Norton Nimnul and Siamese Twins	September 15, 1989	4303-041/045
A criminal mastermind named Aldrin Klordane and his pet cat, Fat Cat, frame aging police detective, Donald Drake, and his canine companion, Plato, for stealing a priceless ruby. While the human police try to get Drake to confess to the crime, a pair of chipmunks named Chip and Dale help Plato find the real culprits. In their attempt to get the ruby back, Chip and Dale follow Fat Cat to a Chinese laundry, and later a fishing boat, where they befriend a fat Australian mouse named Monterey Jack and his housefly companion, Zipper (who are on the fishing boat to get the latest shipment of cheese). However the situation gets complicated when Monty becomes enraged at Fat Cat for throwing his house overboard. While Klordane and Fat Cat head for Glacier Bay, Chip and Dale follow Monterey Jack and Zipper to the home of Monty's old traveling partner Geegaw Hackwrench, hoping to find a vehicle to get them to Glacier Bay, but must deal with Monty's "cheese attacks" (hypnotic spells that occur whenever Monty sees or smells cheese) and an elaborate security system set up by Geegaw's daughter, Gadget. The Rangers return to the city, where Professor Nimnul has transported a glacier to, so it can be crushed and transported underground. After Klordane breaks Drake out of prison as part of his scheme to frame him for his master plan, the Rangers also find themselves having to save Plato from the animal shelter which gets complicated, when Monty, still obsessed with Fat Cat for destroying his home leaves with Zipper. The Rangers discover Klordane and Nimnul's plot to create an underground earthquake via a giant gelatin mould for robbing a bank, and they are the only ones who can stop them. With both Drake and Plato captured, the Rangers must work together to create a second earthquake to bring in the authorities but must contend with Fat Cat first. Note: This 5-part episode is the Origin story of the Rescue Rangers.
19	6	"A Lad in a Lamp"	John Kimball & Bob Zamboni	Eric Lewald	Fat Cat and Genie	October 3, 1989	4303-014
Fat Cat attempts to get hold of a magic lamp, but it falls into the hands of Monterey Jack instead. After Monty alienates the other Rangers by his greed, the genie tricks him into switching places, just as Fat Cat finds the lamp.
20	7	"The Luck Stops Here"	John Kimball & Bob Zamboni	Story by : Kevin Hopps & Luanne Wood; Teleplay by : Kevin Hopps	Kismit	October 6, 1989	4303-020
A failing inventor who believes that all his troubles are due to bad luck alone is aided by the Rangers. However, Gadget learns that the inventor's cat has been sabotaging his inventions.
21	8	"Battle of the Bulge"	John Kimball & Bob Zamboni	Dev Ross & Tad Stones	Fat Cat and Fruit Bats	October 9, 1989	4303-015
Monty's weight problem encourages the Rangers to go on diets and to exercise more frequently. Meanwhile, Fat Cat is hiring Jamaican fruit bats to steal jewels for him.
22	9	"Ghost of a Chance"	John Kimball & Bob Zamboni	Art Cover, Lynda Marano & Bryce Malek	Fat Cat	October 10, 1989	4303-017
While visiting the Tower of London on a quest to stop Fat Cat, the Rangers meet up with the ghost of one of Monty's ancestors, Sir Colby. Monty then learns that Sir Colby isn't as brave as Monty's family's legend makes him out to be.
23	10	"An Elephant Never Suspects"	John Kimball & Bob Zamboni	Julia Lewald (credited as "Julia J. Roberts")	N/A	October 11, 1989	4303-018
The Rangers investigate a peanut shortage at the zoo. When the leader of the zoo's elephants accuses the Rangers of stealing the peanuts, the Rangers must find the real thief in order to clear their names.
24	11	"Fake Me to Your Leader"	John Kimball & Bob Zamboni	Mark Edens	Norton Nimnul	October 12, 1989	4303-021
Professor Nimnul uses his Gigantico Gun on some pillbugs, and an unwitting Zipper, as part of his plan to fake an alien attack and extort much gold for "spaceship fuel".
25	12	"Last Train to Cashville"	John Kimball & Bob Zamboni	Julia Lewald (credited as "Julia J. Roberts")	Fat Cat	October 13, 1989	4303-022
When Dale stays up all night, he's too tired to help the other Rangers with tracking down a stolen toy train the next day and ends up sleepwalking.
26	13	"A Case of Stage Blight" "A Case of Stageblight"	John Kimball & Bob Zamboni	Dev Ross	Sewernose de Bergerac	October 16, 1989	4303-019
The Rangers attend a human opera and discover it is being sabotaged. The culprit is the alligator Sewernose de Bergerac, who plots to replace the lead in the opera.
27	14	"The Case of the Cola Cult"	John Kimball & Rick Leon	Kevin Hopps	Bubbles	October 17, 1989	4303-023
While test-driving the Ranger-mobile, the Rangers stumble across a group of soda-worshipping mice who call themselves the Cola Cult. But it soon becomes clear that the Cult's leaders are exploiting its members, stealing everything they donate, and things get worse when Gadget (who feels that she's losing her engineering edge) joins.
28	15	"Throw Mummy From the Train"	John Kimball & Rick Leon	Julia Lewald (credited as "Julia J. Roberts") & Dev Ross	Wexler and the Pharaoh's Demon	October 18, 1989	4303-024
At the tomb of King Nutun-Khamun, an archeologist finds the ring to unlock the diamonds of the Sphinx of Inka-dinka-do. His greedy assistant Wexler steals the ring and eludes the mummy assigned to guard it, Hiram. Wexler tries to hide the ring and Dale gets it for a while, putting the Rangers on the case.
29	16	"A Wolf in Cheap Clothing"	John Kimball & Rick Leon	Kevin Hopps & Tad Stones	Norton Nimnul	October 19, 1989	4303-025
Prof Nimnul is using a shape-shifting device to trade places with a wolf. While Nimnul robs homes as a wolf, the wolf-turned-human experiences the downtown nightlife.
30	17	"Robocat"	John Kimball & Rick Leon	David Wise	Fat Cat	October 20, 1989	4303-027
A junkman builds a mechanical guard-cat. When it breaks down, Gadget fixes it and makes it friendly. Fat Cat finds out about this and plots to reprogram the cat for his own ends.
31	18	"Does Pavlov Ring a Bell" "Does Pavlov Ring a Bell?"	John Kimball & Rick Leon	Kevin Hopps	Norton Nimnul	November 2, 1989	4303-028
Professor Nimnul trains lab animals to follow the maze that mimics the city's tunnels in order to use them as a navigation system for his bank-robbing super-rat robot. The team befriends two of them, Sparky and Buzz. Meanwhile, the battle between Chip and Dale for Gadget's attention begins to get ugly.
32	19	"Prehysterical Pet"	John Kimball & Rick Leon	Mark Edens	Dr. Piltdown	November 3, 1989	4303-026
Dale's discovery of a rodent-sized space-travelling stegosaurus is certainly a surprise to the Rangers; and when the diminutive dinosaur suddenly begins to grow in size and lose intelligence, the rangers have to save him.
33	20	"A Creep in the Deep"	John Kimball & Rick Leon	Mark Edens	Captain Finn and his crew	November 13, 1989	4303-029
The Rangers are spurred into action by a rash of bizarre attacks on seafood shipments and restaurants. After some research, they find that the attacks are being led by a fish by the name of Captain Fin, who has modified a sunken submarine so that it holds water, allowing Captain Fin and his crew to traverse on land. Note: The submarine seen in this episode is similar to the Nautilus seen in Walt Disney's 1954 film 20,000 Leagues Under the Sea.
34	21	"Normie's Science Project"	John Kimball & Bob Zamboni	Mark Edens	Norton Nimnul and his nephew, Normie	November 14, 1989	4303-016
Professor Nimnul designs a super-weapon that levels cities with mega-amplified sound. However, his nephew Normie borrows the "molecular sound amplifier", the main part of the weapon, for the school science project.
35	22	"Seer No Evil"	John Kimball & Rick Leon	Julia Lewald (credited as "Julia J. Roberts")	Prize man and his Monkey	November 15, 1989	4303-030
While at a carnival, the Rangers meet a fortune-telling moth named Cassandra, who predicts that Chip will be killed "before the next sun rises". On learning that one of the carnival members is a crook who is using his monkey accomplice to rob the homes of those people who have won prizes at his booth, the Rangers must find a way to solve the case while keeping Chip out of harm's way.
36	23	"Chipwrecked Shipmunks"	John Kimball & Bob Zamboni	Kevin Hopps	The Pi-rats	November 16, 1989	4303-033
When the Rangers are shipwrecked on an island, Gadget and Chip try to find a way off the island before a hurricane hits while Monty and Dale find treasure. The pirate rats then come to the island to search for the treasure that Dale and Monty found.
37	24	"When Mice Were Men"	John Kimball & Bob Zamboni	Eric Lewald	El Emenopio	November 17, 1989	4303-048
Monty gets invited over Tramplonia, Spain, where he is regarded as a hero for defeating a vicious bull. Truth is, Monty didn't defeat the bull with his bare hands, and that bull is out seeking revenge. Note: This is the first episode (not counting the "To The Rescue" five-part pilot) in which Jim Cummings voices Monterey Jack.
38	25	"Chocolate Chips"	John Kimball & Bob Zamboni	Dev Ross & Tad Stones	Hendrick Von Sugarbottom and Mosquitos	November 20, 1989	4303-031
While on vacation in the Amazon, a mad, German chocolate lover employs mosquitoes loaded with drugs to make the locals easily hypnotizeable and make them unknowingly work night shifts at his chocolate factory, and Dale is the only member of the Rangers unaffected by the drugs.
39	26	"The Last Leprechaun"	John Kimball & Bob Zamboni	David Wise	Queen of the Banshees	November 21, 1989	4303-034
The Rangers crash-land in Ireland and are tricked by Darby Spree, King of the Leprechauns, into helping him rescue his fellow leprechauns from their enslavement to a banshee. Note: This is the last episode in which Peter Cullen voices Monterey Jack.
40	27	"Weather or Not"	John Kimball & Bob Zamboni	Dev Ross	Norton Nimnul	November 22, 1989	4303-038
Professor Nimnul's weather machine vs. Monterey Jack's weather-predicting tail.
41	28	"One-Upsman-Chip"	John Kimball & Bob Zamboni	Julia Lewald (credited as "Julia J. Roberts")	Fat Cat	November 23, 1989	4303-051
While Fat Cat plots to steal the world's biggest pearl from a tank guarded by a vicious shark, Chip and Dale engage in a war of practical jokes that ends with Dale in Fat Cat's clutches.
42	29	"Shell Shocked"	John Kimball & Bob Zamboni	Julia J. Roberts	Fat Cat	November 24, 1989	4303-053
The Rangers attempt to enjoy a day at the beach is nearly ruined by Chip's micromanagement style, so Dale is made leader for the day, just before the group discovers that the beach's crabs are having their shells stolen.
43	30	"Love is a Many Splintered Thing"	John Kimball & Bob Zamboni	Len Uhley	Desiree D'Allure and Errol	December 18, 1989	4303-037
While fighting two wooden furniture thugs, Monterey Jack gets distracted by a smell that's (for once) not cheese. Rather, it's the smell of perfume from Desiree D'Allure, a female mouse he fell in love with back when he was a globetrotting explorer (and whom he planned to marry, only to get a whiff from a cheese truck and eat himself into a food coma), who comes back into his life and begs him to help her get away from her criminal boyfriend — but Chip thinks the entire thing is a trap.
44	31	"Song of the Night 'n Dale" "Song of the Night 'n' Dale"	John Kimball & Bob Zamboni	Tad Stones	Su Lin	December 19, 1989	4303-036
The Rangers' new vehicle, the Ranger Wing, accidentally takes them to the Himalayas, where they come to the aid of the emperor's songbird, Chirp Sing. It appears that the gentle emperor is going insane, while his greedy sister plots to sell the valley to developers. The Rangers must discover what is really going on and turn the tables on the scheming Su Lin.
45	32	"Double 'O Chipmunk" "Double 'O' Chipmunks"	John Kimball & Bob Zamboni	Julia Lewald (credited as "Julia J. Roberts") & Kevin Hopps	Fake Professor, Frances, Moe and Louie	December 20, 1989	4303-035
Dale and Zipper decide to emulate their heroes, Dirk Suave (Double 'O Super-Spy) and Odd Shoe, and soon become involved in a real spy caper.
46	33	"Gadget Goes Hawaiian"	John Kimball & Bob Zamboni	Julia Lewald (credited as "Julia J. Roberts")	Lawhinie	December 21, 1989	4303-040
Gadget is tricked by her Hawaiian double, Lahwhinie, into trading places with her right before the Hawaiian mouse is to be tested for her worthiness to become queen of the mice.
47	34	"It's a Bird, It's Insane, It's Dale!"	John Kimball & Bob Zamboni	Dev Ross & Tad Stones	Seymour	December 22, 1989	4303-049
Two parts of a meteor crashing into Earth give Dale and a crooked travel agent super stretching powers. Dale becomes the Rubber Bando and leaves the Rangers, while Seymour uses his powers to steal national monuments for ransom. Soon the Rubber Bando is blamed for the thefts, and must turn to the Rangers for help.
48	35	"Short Order Crooks"	John Kimball & Bob Zamboni	Mark Edens	Fry and Spud	February 5, 1990	4303-047
Monterey Jack and Zipper go to an abandoned diner to prepare Monty's famous cheese chowder (after it explodes in their kitchen), only to discover that a pair of crooks are using the diner to dig their way into a neighboring bank. Things get complicated when the police mistake the crooks for the chefs behind the cheese chowder and the police come over to try it.
49	36	"Mind Your Cheese and Q's"	John Kimball & Bob Zamboni	Michael Price Nelson & Burt Brown	Rat Capone and his henchmen	February 6, 1990	4303-057
After botching a rescue due to a cheese attack, Monterey Jack decides to give up cheese, which is easier said than done, especially when there's a cheese shortage in town courtesy of Rat Capone.
50	37	"Out of Scale"	John Kimball & Bob Zamboni	David Wise	The Radsky Wadsky Family	February 8, 1990	4303-039
A gangster has kidnapped Professor Nimnul, and is using his Gigantico Gun (in reverse) to steal museums and statues, both for the valuables inside, and to provide doll houses for his spoiled daughter Buffy. The Rangers are on the case, until Chip and Dale are captured and forced to be Buffy's pets. Note: This episode shares its name with a 1951 Donald Duck short that featured Chip 'n' Dale.
51	38	"Dirty Rotten Diapers"	John Kimball & Bob Zamboni	Dev Ross, Ken Koonce & David Wiemers	Baby Thaddeus, Monrovia and Pomona	February 19, 1990	4303-056
Gadget decides to adopt a policy of non-violence for the team, which is immediately put to the test as the Rangers investigate a dwarf posing as a baby to rob the homes of rich childless couples. NOTE: Reruns of this episode on The Disney Channel changed some lines that may be construed as encouraging child abuse. Gadget's "Well, I say we kindly go back to that house, gently go inside, then drag that baby out by his dirty rotten diapers!", "Trash the brat!" and "Let's shake that baby 'til he rattles!" were respectively changed to "Well, I say we kindly go back to that house, gently go inside, then drag that impostor out by his dirty rotten diapers", "Trash the bum!" and "Let's shake that bum 'til he rattles!" while Monterey Jack's "I vote we keep the brat from ever reaching three!" (after Gadget says that Baby Thaddeus is having his terrible twos), "Let's put that kid behind bars, and I don't mean his crib," and "Gandhi would want to take a swing at this kid," were changed to "If you ask me, this case is all washed up!" (in reference to being put in the dishwasher), "Let's put that crook behind bars, and I don't mean his crib," and "Gandhi would want to take a swing at this guy." Surprisingly, Toon Disney aired the version with the original lines. The original version isn't on DVD (as it was never released on DVD), but can be found on the complete series Blu-Ray and available for streaming and digital download on Disney+, Amazon Prime Video, iTunes, and Google Play.
52	39	"Good Times, Bat Times"	John Kimball & Bob Zamboni	Bruce Talkington	Winifred (Freddy), Bud and Lou	February 21, 1990	4303-046
A washerwoman named Winifred is seeking to become a witch by means of a spell she found in the library. Compiling the ingredients are her familiars: Bud the snake, Lou the spider, and Foxglove the bat. During her mission, Foxglove falls in love with Dale, and has second thoughts about being a villain.
53	40	"Pie in the Sky"	John Kimball & Bob Zamboni	Sindy McKay & Larry Swerdlove	Sweeney and Todd	February 22, 1990	4303-058
The Rangers help a lost sparrow return to Capistrano and discover a bad "chicken" pie outfit using an electromagnet to catch the migrating birds. This episode also has references to the Stage Musical, Sweeney Todd: The Demon Barber of Fleet Street. Note: This episode featured the voice of Ruth Buzzi.
54	41	"Le Purrfect Crime"	John Kimball & Bob Zamboni	Dean Stefan, Ken Koonce & David Weimers	Maltese de Sade	March 19, 1990	4303-060
When the Rangers learn that dogs are fleeing from Paris, they travel there and learn about the latest plot of Maltese de Sade, Fat Cat's cousin. Meanwhile, Dale realizes he's a distraction to the rest of the Rescue Rangers and wanders aimlessly through Paris, where he suffers amnesia and is brainwashed by Maltese de Sade into fighting against his friends.
55	42	"When You Fish Upon a Star"	John Kimball & Bob Zamboni	Julia Lewald (credited as "Julia J. Roberts")	Fat Cat	March 21, 1990	4303-061
When the Rangers go to investigate a sunken ship, they learn that Fat Cat is responsible, as he hired fireflies to confuse the captain.
56	43	"Rest Home Rangers"	John Kimball & Bob Zamboni	Mark Edens & Michael Edens	Norton Nimnul	March 22, 1990	4303-063
When Professor Nimnul invents an aging ray and turns Monty (who is already insecure about getting old) into an old man, the Rescue Rangers attempt to stop the mad Professor and reverse the effects of his ray on Monty.
57	44	"A Lean on the Property"	John Kimball & Bob Zamboni	Bruce Reid Schaefer, Ken Koonce & David Weimers	Fat Cat	April 16, 1990	4303-062
Monty's mother Camembert Kate (last seen at the end of "Parental Discretion Retired") comes to visit, but Monty can't stand her smothering and does what he can to prove that he's a grown mouse. In his latest dog-ridding scheme, Fat Cat recruits a team of moles to dig underneath the foundations of the city's buildings, causing them to lean over, and driving everyone (and their dogs) out of town. Note: Following the September 11th terrorist attacks in the United States, this episode was banned from reruns on The Disney Channel and Toon Disney. As of 2019, this episode is available on streaming through Disney+, Amazon Prime Video, iTunes, and Google Play, and is on the complete series Blu-Ray.
58	45	"The Pied Piper Power Play"	John Kimball & Bob Zamboni	Dean Stefan	Norton Nimnul	April 23, 1990	4303-064
Nimnul hypnotizes all the mice in town (including Monty and Gadget) into running on hamster wheels, so that they can charge a powerful generator for him. Dale's own hypnotic skills are the only thing that can help deal with this crisis. Note: Reruns of this episode on The Disney Channel and Toon Disney (though not the version shown on Disney XD in May 2022 as part of a marathon promoting the Chip 'n Dale Rescue Rangers movie) edited out all scenes featuring a deaf-mute character named Mouseo, which Disney executives at the time felt was a negative stereotype. The Blu-ray version and the version shown on Disney+ have reinstated the scenes.
59	46	"Gorilla My Dreams"	John Kimball & Bob Zamboni	Story by : Sindy McKay & Larry Swerdlove; Teleplay by : Julia Lewald (credited as "Julia Jane Lewald") & Dev Ross	Fat Cat	May 1, 1990	4303-065
The Rangers agree to rescue Ku-Ku the gorilla's pet kitten Boots who was catnapped by Fat Cat. Fat Cat is holding Boots hostage, so that Ku-Ku will commit crimes for him.
60	47	"The S.S. Drainpipe"	John Kimball & Bob Zamboni	Michael P. Nelson & Burt Brown	Rat Capone and his henchmen	May 2, 1990	4303-032
Rat Capone's use of slave labour to build himself a castle draws the attention of the Rangers — unfortunately, Dale's attempts to emulate his TV hero, the Red Badger of Courage, lead to the other four rangers becoming the slave labour.

=== Season 3 (1990) ===
No. overall	No. in season	Title	Directed by	Written by	Villain(s)	Original release date	Prod. code
61	1	"Zipper Come Home"	John Kimball & Bob Zamboni	Dev Ross	The Water Beetle Tribe	September 10, 1990	4303-052
Zipper leaves the Rescue Rangers after Monty blames him for ruining his cheese souffle and becomes the king of a tribe of water beetles. Little does he know that the tribe has a bad habit of sacrificing their kings to a giant frog.
62	2	"Puffed Rangers"	John Kimball & Bob Zamboni	Mark Edens	Chin the cereal manufacturer	September 18, 1990	4303-054
The Rescue Rangers go to Hong Kong, where a cereal manufacturer is smuggling cars into the US without import fees by shrinking them into cereal toys. Note: The version shown on all reruns and home media releases (including streaming) is an edited version that redubs the stereotypical East Asian voices of the auto executive villains and changes and removes many racist jokes about China and Chinese culture.
63	3	"A Fly in the Ointment"	John Kimball & Bob Zamboni	Alan Burnett	Professor Norton Nimnul	September 26, 1990	4303-055
Professor Nimnul has invented a device to transmit himself across telephone wires and uses it to steal scientific devices from guarded laboratories. A neglected Zipper discovers Nimnul in the act and is caught in the Modemizer with him, leading to two creatures out of The Fly.
64	4	"A Chorus Crime"	John Kimball & Bob Zamboni	Doug Hutchinson	Norton Nimnul	November 5, 1990	4303-059
The Rescue Rangers break up when Monty and Zipper refuse to help the others locate the missing tap shoes of a female dog named Canina La Fur and instead are trying to locate the cause of what has been sinking cargo ships in the Arctic Circle. Both groups soon find that both these random events are connected, as Nimnul had stolen all of the dance shoes so that he can get a group of penguins to create icebergs through excessive tap dancing to sink the ships with and steal their cargo.
65	5	"They Shoot Dogs, Don't They"	John Kimball & Bob Zamboni	Story by : Bruce Reid Schaefer, Ken Koonce & David Weimers; Teleplay by : Ken Koonce & David Weimers	Zsa Zsa Labador	November 19, 1990	4303-050
In the final episode of the series, Zsa Zsa Labador, Canina La Fur's stand-in, strands her in Taxedermia, where all animals are fair game for hunting. Worse, the Rescue Rangers are separated, with Monty being stuck with Canina, and despite not being one of her fans, he must help get Canina out of the country.
