= Chip 'n Dale Rescue Rangers 2 =

1993 video game

Chip 'n Dale: Rescue Rangers 2
- Cover art
- Developer: Capcom
- Publisher: Capcom
- Producer: Tokuro Fujiwara
- Composers: Sachiko Oita; Akihiro Akamatsu
- Series: Chip 'n Dale: Rescue Rangers
- Platform: NES
- Release: JP: December 10, 1993; NA: January 1994; EU: September 29, 1994
- Genre: Platform
- Modes: Single-player, multiplayer

Chip 'n Dale Rescue Rangers 2 (Note: Japanese: チップとデールの大作戦2, Hepburn: Chippu to Dēru no Daisakusen 2; lit. Chip 'n Dale's Mission 2) is a platform game released in December 1993 in Japan, and the following month in the United States. It is based on the Disney cartoon Chip 'n Dale Rescue Rangers, about Chip and Dale, two crime-fighting chipmunks. It is a sequel to the 1990 video game.

The game was included in The Disney Afternoon Collection compilation for PlayStation 4, Windows, and Xbox One released in April 2017.

== Gameplay ==
Chip 'n Dale Rescue Rangers 2 is a platform game featuring single and 2-player cooperative modes. As with the first game, each individual stage is set up as a side-scrolling action game where Chip and Dale can walk, jump, duck, and pick up objects such as acorns, crates, barrels, and balls to throw at enemies and bosses. Each character can withstand only three direct hits before they lose a life, though it is possible to earn more hits over the course of the game.

Unlike the first game, there is no map screen as the stages are set in a linear order. The only exception is at the amusement park, in which the first three stages can be played in any order before entering the final stage. In a one-player game, the player can choose to be either Chip or Dale. In a two-player game, Player 1 is Chip and Player 2 is Dale. A new feature added to this game from the first is the ability for one player to pick up and throw the other as a weapon.

== Plot ==
The Rescue Rangers catch a news report stating that a bomb has been set to explode at a local restaurant. At once, Chip, Dale, Gadget, Monterey Jack, and Zipper set off to defuse the explosive before it goes off. While there, they manage to corner the rabbit responsible for setting the bomb, who admits that it was Fat Cat who ordered him to do it (having broken out of prison the night before) so he can steal a relic called the Urn of the Pharaoh from a docked cargo ship.

The Rangers give chase to the docks. After a search of the ship turns up nothing, Zipper then spots Fat Cat running into a warehouse. Chip and Dale follow him inside, but are ambushed and locked in a refrigerator to freeze. Though the chipmunks escape in time, Fat Cat opens the Urn and releases the evil spirits contained within it.

As the warehouse fills with ghosts, Chip and Dale manage to retrieve the Urn and seal it up again. Fat Cat then challenges the Rescue Rangers to meet him at the amusement park for a final showdown. After navigating through the attractions (Clock Tower, Western World, and Future World), Chip and Dale unlock the door to the control room, where Fat Cat attacks them with a giant robot modelled after himself. Once it's destroyed, Chip and Dale go after Fat Cat while the ceiling begins to collapse, but are unable to find him and are forced to escape. Reunited, the Rescue Rangers swear that they'll stop Fat Cat the next time he shows up.

== Reception ==
Reception

Review scores
Publication	Score
AllGame	4.5/5
Consoles +	92%
Electronic Gaming Monthly	8/10, 7/10, 6/10, 8/10, 7/10
Famitsu	6/10, 4/10, 5/10, 5/10
Game Players	84%
HobbyConsolas	85/100
Jeuxvideo.com	17/20
Player One	80%
Superjuegos	90/100
Total!	3-
Banzzaï	89%
Nintendo Acción	85/100
Nintendo Player	3/6
Power Unlimited	6.6/10
VideoGames	7/10

Chip 'n Dale Rescue Rangers 2 received a 19.9/30 score in a readers' poll conducted by Family Computer Magazine. The game also garnered generally favorable reviews from critics.

GamePro's Boss Music urged players to "dust off their 8-bit" console for the game, praising the title's "chipper" music and "cute" sound effects, but found that it lacked adequate challenge, writing that "Rescue 2's about as challenging as the original - perfect for beginners or intermediate players, but a tad easy for anyone else". The game was a runner-up for GamePro's 1993 NES Game of the Year award, but lost to Kirby's Adventure. Game Players' Jonathan Gagnon declared that the gameplay was "simple", but that it lived up to previous Capcom and Disney collaborative projects with its "top" graphics and responsive controls. Electronic Gaming Monthly's Mike Weigand wrote that "for an 8-bit platform, Rescue Rangers comes off rather well and, if anything, makes you wish for a 16-bit version!"

== See also ==
- List of Disney video games
