= Chip 'n Dale Rescue Rangers: The Adventures in Nimnul's Castle =

1990 video game

- Developer: Riedel Software Productions
- Publishers: Disney Computer Software; Hi Tech Expressions
- Platform: MS-DOS
- Release: 1990
- Genre: Action
- Mode: Single-player

Chip 'n Dale Rescue Rangers: The Adventures in Nimnul's Castle (also spelled without an "s" as "Adventure in Nimnul's Castle" on the title screen) is an action video game developed by Riedel Software Productions and co-published by Hi Tech Expressions and Walt Disney Computer Software based on the Disney animated series of the same name. The game was released in 1990 for MS-DOS.

== Gameplay ==
Adventures in Nimnul's Castle is an action game where the player must guide the chipmunk characters Chip and Dale through nine levels while avoiding enemies and obstacles. Each level takes place in one of three locations: outside the castle, on the castle steps, and inside the castle proper, with the stage objectives varying between them, such as simply avoiding all enemies while moving across the screen or collecting items such as screws. The player is awarded points for each successful objective they complete, and has three attempts to make it through the game. Short cutscenes appear at the beginning and end of the game, as well as after certain levels.

== Plot ==
The Rescue Rangers have to rescue their partner Monterey Jack, who is caught in a mousetrap in Professor Norton Nimnul's castle. To accomplish this, the chipmunks must infiltrate the mad scientist's abode while avoiding his mechanical guard dogs to collect parts so their friend Gadget can build a flying machine to reach him.

== Reception ==
In 2009, GamesRadar included the game in their list of "The Disney Games You Forgot Existed". The website compared it to the similar PC "abomination" DuckTales: The Quest for Gold, criticizing its lackluster plot and graphics that sometimes made it difficult to differentiate the characters from the background.
