= Earl Johnson (American football) =

American football and basketball coach

Playing career

Football
- 1904–1905: Doane
- 1907–1908: Doane
- Position: Halfback

Coaching career (HC unless noted)

Football
- 1910–1912: Doane
- 1913–1917: Nebraska State Normal

Basketball
- 1913–1917: Nebraska State Normal

Head coaching record
- Overall: 24–29–5 (football); 26–23 (basketball)

Earl "Peanuts" Johnson was an American football and basketball coach. He served as the head football coach at Doane College from 1910 to 1912 and at Nebraska State Normal School—now known as Peru State College—from 1913 to 1917, compiling a career college football coaching record of 24–29–5. Johnson was also the head basketball coach at Nebraska State Normal from 1913 to 1918, tallying a mark of 26–23.

== Coaching career ==
Johnson was the 13th head football coach at Doane College in Crete, Nebraska and he held that position for three seasons, from 1910 until 1912. His coaching record at Doane was 11–10–1.
