= List of storms named Errol =

The name Errol has been used for five tropical cyclones in the Australian region of the Southern Hemisphere:

- Cyclone Errol (1982) – a Category 2 tropical cyclone that caused flood damage in Western Australia.
- Cyclone Errol (1991) – a Category 4 severe tropical cyclone that remained at sea.
- Cyclone Errol (2002) – a Category 1 tropical cyclone that passed near Cocos Island.
- Cyclone Errol (2011) – a Category 3 severe tropical cyclone that affected East Timor.
- Cyclone Errol (2025) – a Category 5 severe tropical cyclone that made landfall in Western Australia.
