= Mushroom House =

Contemporary residence in the town of Perinton, New York

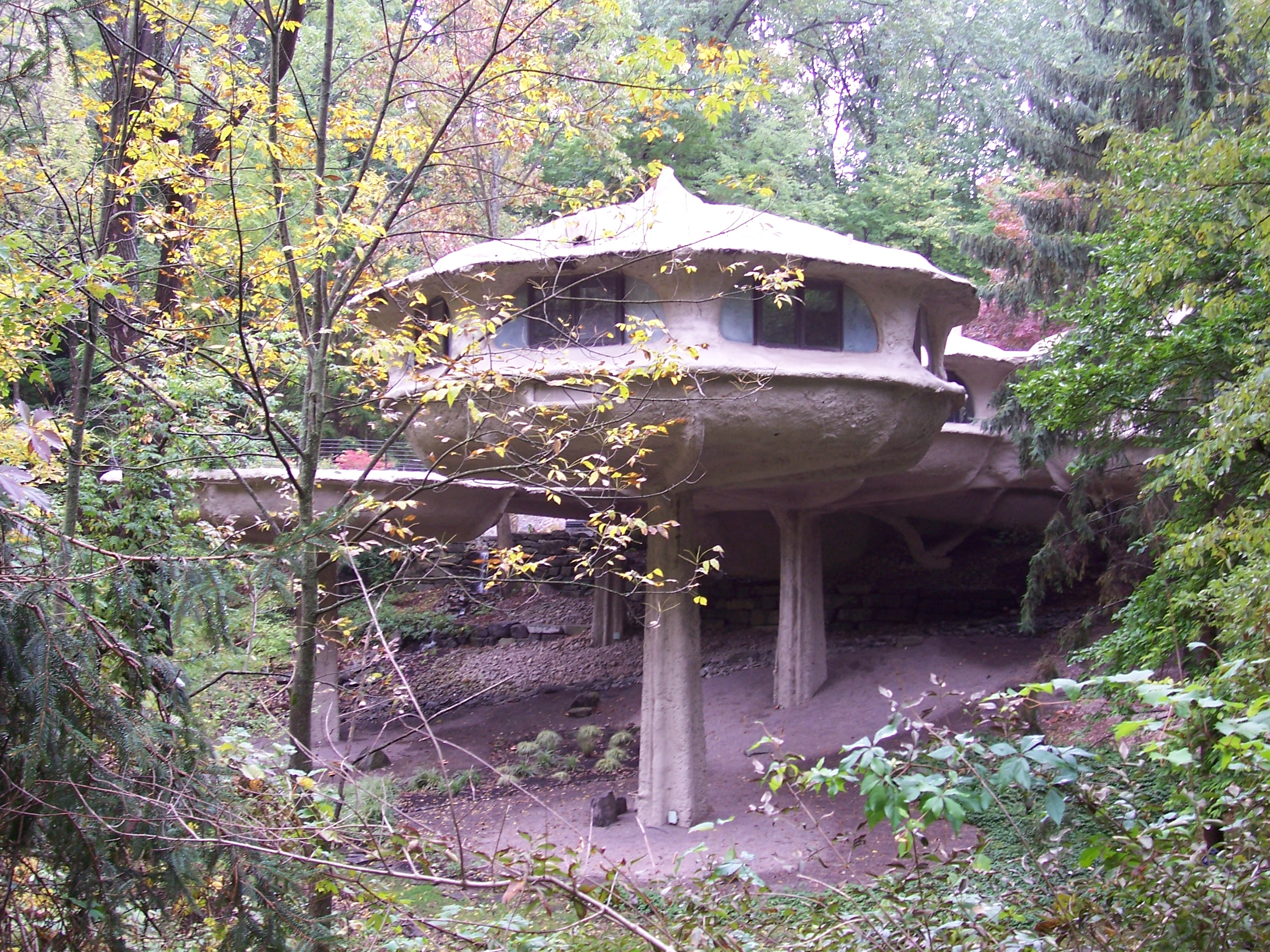
- The House in 2010
- Interactive map of the Mushroom House area
- Alternative names: Pod House

General information
- Type: Architecture school
- Architectural style: Contemporary
- Location: Perinton, New York, 142 Park Road; Pittsford, New York 14534
- Coordinates: 43°2′52″N 77°28′28″W
- Elevation: 507 feet (155 m)
- Construction started: 1970
- Completed: 1972
- Renovated: 2001
- Client: Robert and Marguerite Antell
- Owner: Whitman family

Height
- Height: 30 feet (9.1 m)

Technical details
- Structural system: concrete and steel rods
- Floor count: 2
- Floor area: 4,168 square feet

Design and construction
- Architect: James H. Johnson

The Mushroom House or Pod House is a contemporary residence in the town of Perinton, New York, which has been featured in television programs (like HGTV's Offbeat America series) and books (like the Weird U.S. series) due to its whimsical appearance. Patterned after umbels of Queen Anne's Lace, its brown color is more suggestive of mushrooms. The house was constructed for attorney-artist couple Robert and Marguerite Antell between 1970 and 1972 and was designated a town landmark in 1989.

The structure is sited in a moderately-wooded ravine adjacent to Powder Mills Park. The house itself comprises four 80 ton pods which rest on reinforced concrete stems of 14 to 20 feet in height. These fan out from three feet in diameter where they connect to the pods to five feet at the base. The sides of each pod's "cap" are completely windowed. One pod serves as the living and dining area, one as the kitchen, and two as sleeping areas. An additional "half pod" provides an open deck area. The house has three bedrooms and three bathrooms in 4,168 square feet.

In February 2012, the house sold for $729,000, after the original asking price of $1.1 million failed to attract a buyer.

== Gallery ==
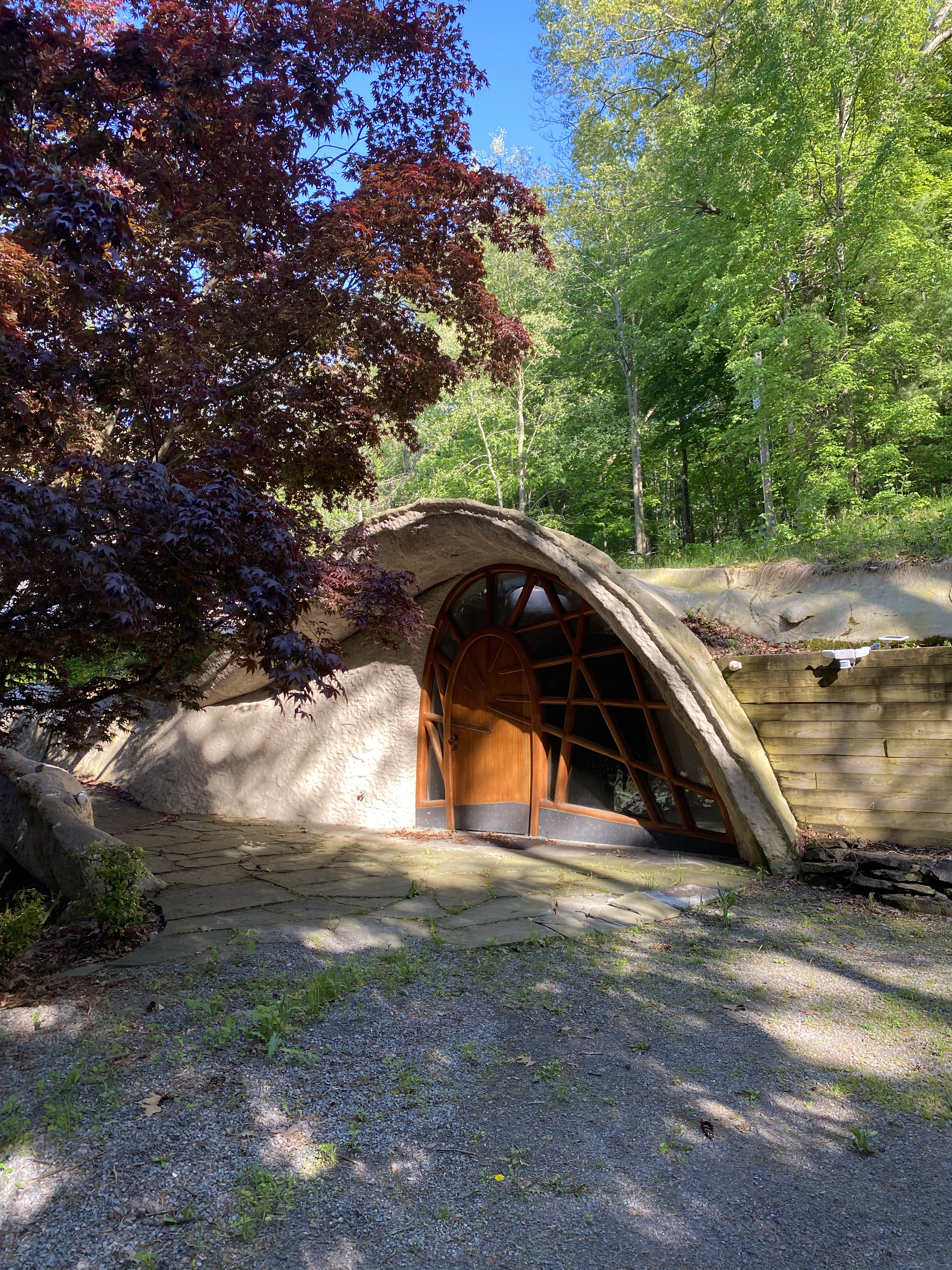
Entrance to the Mushroom House in Perinton, New York.

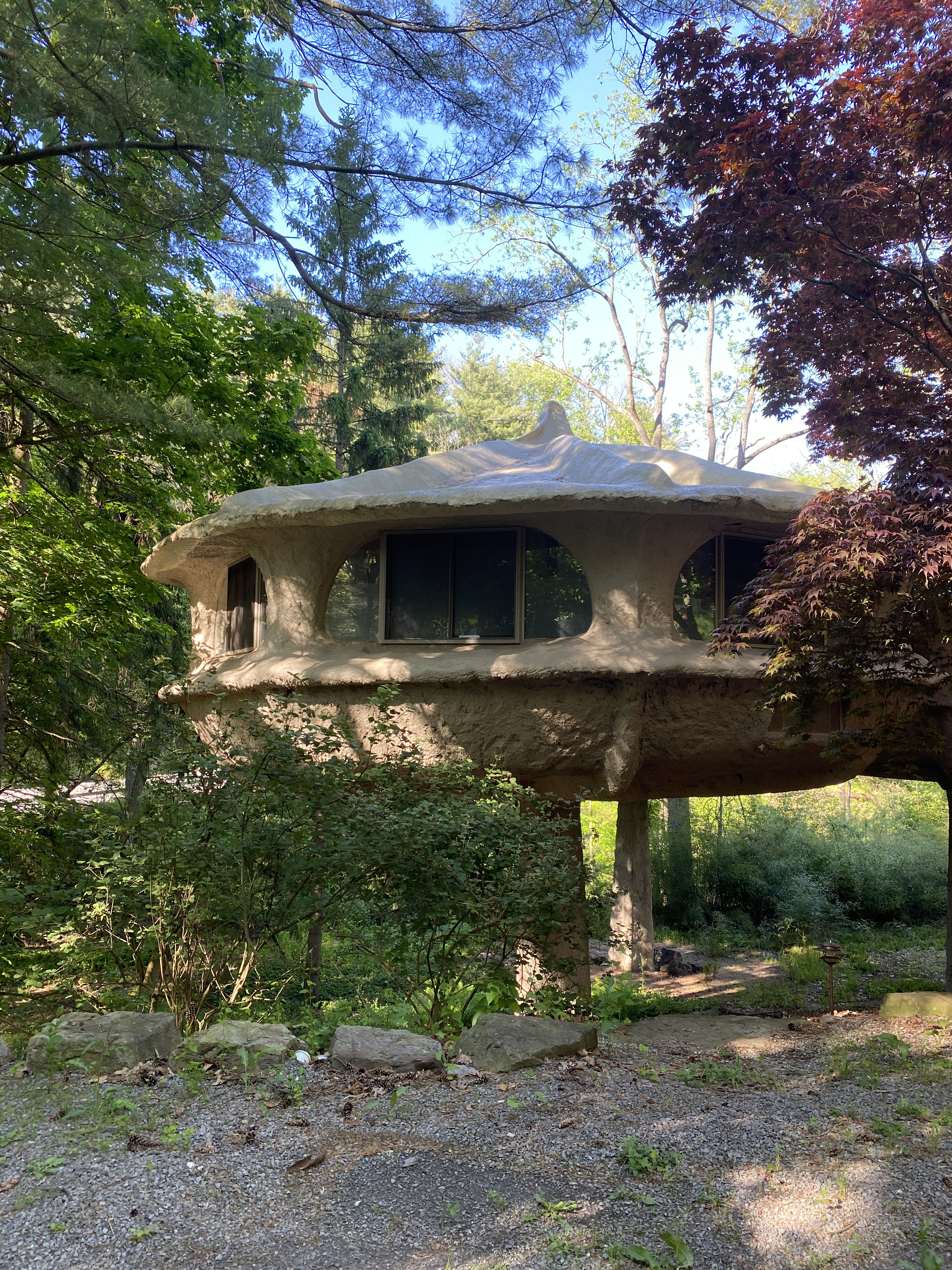
Closer view of the Mushroom House in Perinton, New York.

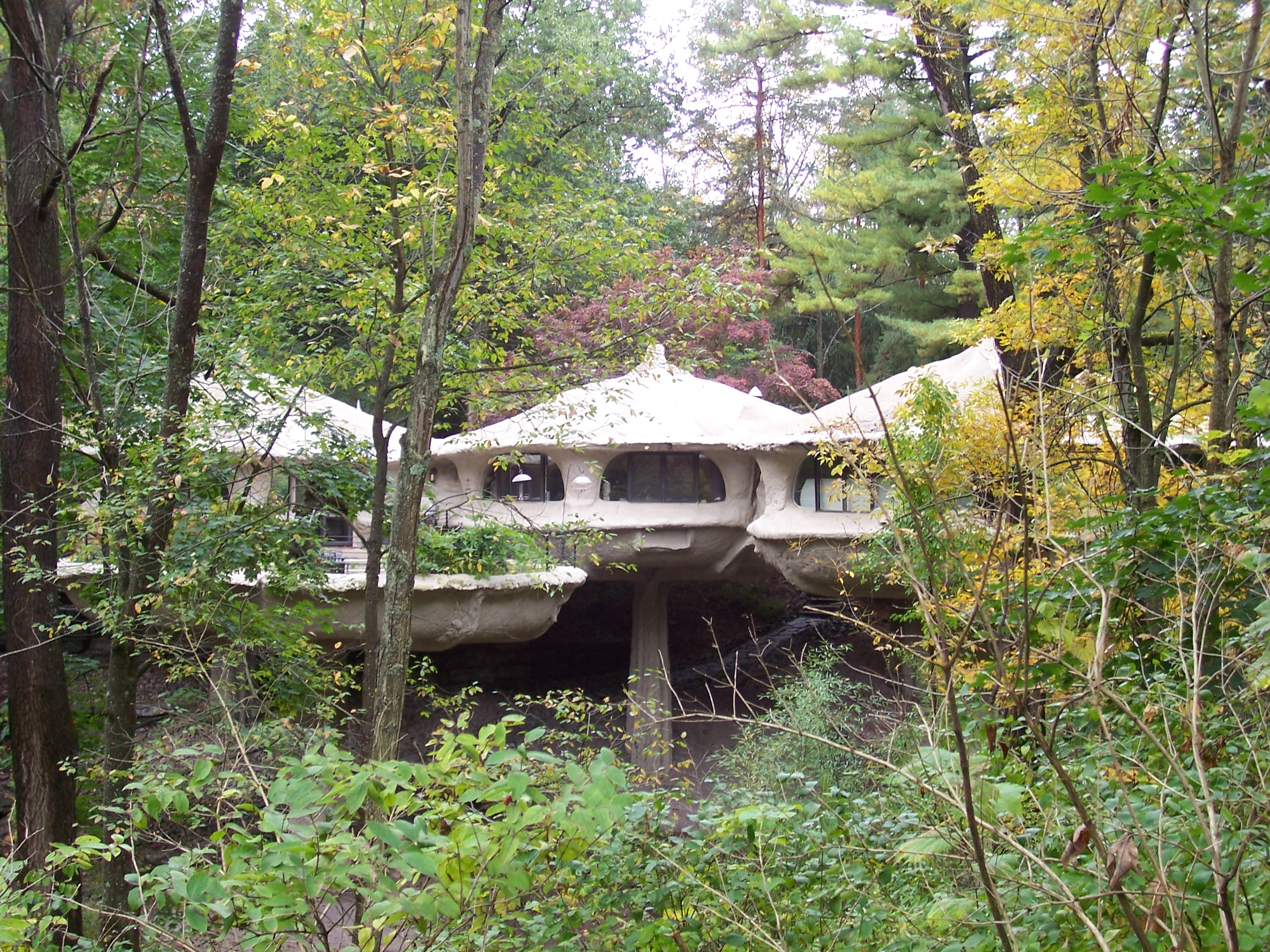
Another view of the Mushroom House in Pittsford, New York.

== See also ==
- Earl Young (architect)
