= Erol =

Erol is a Turkish given name or surname meaning "brave". This name is shared by the following people:

== Given name ==
- Erol Alkan (born 1974), Turkish Cypriot DJ, artist and record producer
- Erol Erdal Alkan (born 1994), Turkish footballer
- Erol Bekir (born 1974), Macedonian-Swedish footballer and manager player
- Erol Bulut (born 1975), Turkish footballer
- Erol Bulut (1955–2021), Turkish painter
- Erol Bilgin (born 1987), Turkish weightlifter
- Erol Büyükburç (1936–2015), Turkish pop music singer and composer
- Erol Çevikçe (born 1937), Turkish politician
- Erol Erdinç (born 1945), Turkish classical pianist and conductor
- Erol Erduran, Turkish Cypriot educator and writer
- Erol Evcil (born 1966), Turkish businessman
- Erol Evgin (born 1947), Turkish pop singer, composer and film actor
- Erol Gelenbe, Turkish-French academic, computer scientist, electronic engineer and applied mathematician
- Erol Günaydın (1933–2012), Turkish theater and film actor
- Erol Güngör (1938–1983), Turkish sociologist
- Erol Madison Gwion (1965–2023), Liberian politician
- Erol Iba (born 1979), Indonesian footballer
- Erol Kemah (born 1961), Turkish sport wrestler
- Erol Keskin (1927–2016), Turkish footballer
- Erol Mütercimler (born 1954), Turkish journalist, columnist and academic
- Erol Onaran (1934–2005), Turkish-American businessman
- Erol Otus, American artist and game designer
- Erol Ozensoy (born 1953), Turkish entrepreneur, industrialist and businessman
- Erol Sabancı (born 1938), Turkish billionaire banker
- Erol Sabanov (born 1974), Bulgarian-German footballer of Turkish origin
- Erol Sander (born 1968), Turkish-German actor
- Erol Taş (1928–1998), Turkish film actor
- Erol Togay (1950–2012), Turkish footballer
- Erol Toy (1936–2021), Turkish writer
- Erol Tuncer (born 1938), Turkish engineer, bureaucrat and politician
- Erol Uenala, Turkish-Swiss industrial and metal musician

== Surname ==
- Altan Erol (born 1983), Turkish professional basketball player
- Cemre Erol (born 1992), Turkish volleyball player
- Didem Erol (born 1975), Australian-born Turkish-American actress, model, and TV host
- Esra Erol (footballer) (born 1985), Turkish footballer
- Esra Erol (TV presenter) (born 1982), Turkish television presenter.
- Metin Erol (born 1987), Turkish footballer
- Safiye Erol (1902–1964), Turkish novelist
- Şerif Erol (born 1963), Turkish actor and screenwriter

== See also ==
- Errol (disambiguation), English given name
