= Earl Levine =

Earl Levine was one of the technical leaders in the fields of streaming media, data compression, and audio watermarking technologies during the dot-com bubble of the late 1990s and onward, winning the prestigious Capocelli Prize for data compression in 1997.

His PhD work at Stanford University was early in the field of artificial intelligence, creating vector quantized autoencoder convolutional neural networks. He then invented the lossless audio codec method used in Apple Lossless Codec and FLAC, used to create the largest collection of lossless audio at the time. He worked at VXtreme until its acquisition by Microsoft. Following that he worked for Liquid Audio. Liquid Audio's patent portfolio, almost all of which he invented or co-invented, was acquired by Microsoft in 2002.

He is also known for his successful hobby of training race horses including Fleet Crossing who won the Churchill Downs, MSW

He established one of the first shared neighborhood wi-fi systems in 2002

He graduated from Richardson High School in the same class as Carla Overbeck.

His son, Gabrael Levine, is the inventor of the Blackbird bipedal robot and the preeminent developer of the OpenTorque actuator.
