= Earl Edwards =

Earl Edwards may refer to:

- Earl Edwards (songwriter), American songwriter
- Earl Edwards (American football) (born 1946), American football player
- Earl Gene Edwards (1932–2022), American house church planter, author, and Southern Baptist pastor and evangelist
- Earl Edwards Jr. (born 1992), American soccer player

== See also ==
- Earle Edwards (1908–1997), American football coach
