= Paint Research Association =

English research institute

Coordinates: 52°46′13″N 0°53′31″W

The Paint Research Association is a research institute, formerly in Teddington, south-west London, and now in Melton Mowbray, Leicestershire. It is now known as the PRA.

== History ==
It was established as the Research Association of British Paint, Colour and Varnish Manufacturers in 1926; in 1971 it changed its name to the Paint Research Association. Historically, the main paint manufacturer in the UK has been ICI, under the trade name of Dulux.

Its first main research institute building opened in 1936. In 2005, it moved to the Coatings Technology Centre. In 2015, it moved to Melton.

== Function ==
It carried out research for the government and for industry. It claims to be a world authority on paint and surface coatings.
