= Chip 'n Dale: Rescue Rangers (TV series) =

American animated television series

- Genre: Adventure; Comedy; Mystery
- Created by: Tad Stones; Alan Zaslove
- Based on: Chip 'n' Dale by Bill Justice
- Directed by: John Kimball; Bob Zamboni; Rick Leon; Jamie Mitchell
- Voices of: Corey Burton; Tress MacNeille; Peter Cullen; Jim Cummings
- Theme music composer: Mark Mueller
- Opening theme: "Rescue Rangers Theme" by Jeff Pescetto
- Ending theme: "Rescue Rangers Theme" (Instrumental)
- Composer: Glen Daum (for Score Productions)
- Country of origin: United States
- Original language: English
- No. of seasons: 3
- No. of episodes: 65 (list of episodes)

Production
- Producers: Tad Stones (S1–2); Alan Zaslove
- Running time: 22–23 minutes
- Production companies: Walt Disney Television Animation (Note: Animation outsourced to Luk Film, Sunwoo Animation, TMS Entertainment, Walt Disney Animation Japan and Wang Film Productions.); Walt Disney Television

Original release
- Network: The Disney Channel
- Release: March 4 – May 21, 1989
- Network: Syndication
- Release: September 15, 1989 – November 19, 1990

Related
- Chip 'n Dale: Rescue Rangers (2022)

Chip 'n Dale: Rescue Rangers is an American animated television series created by Tad Stones and Alan Zaslove and produced by Walt Disney Television Animation. It featured established Disney characters Chip 'n' Dale in a new setting. After the episode "Catteries Not Included" aired on August 27, 1988, as a preview, the series premiered on The Disney Channel on March 4, 1989. The series continued in syndication in September 1989 with a two-hour special, Rescue Rangers: To the Rescue, later divided into five parts to air as part of the weekday run. On September 18, 1989, the series entered national syndication. It often aired on afternoons along with DuckTales, and beginning on September 10, 1990, as a part of the syndicated programming block The Disney Afternoon. The final episode aired on November 19, 1990.

Reruns aired on The Disney Afternoon until 1993. Subsequently, reruns were shown on The Disney Channel starting in 1995, and on Toon Disney upon that channel's launch in 1998. The entire run became available (as one season) as part of Disney+ as of its launch on November 12, 2019, fully remastered in high definition. The series was initially released on Blu-ray on January 25, 2022, via Disney Movie Club, then everywhere else on February 15, 2022.

A live-action/animated metafictional follow-up film of the same name was released on Disney+ on May 20, 2022. From that same day, Disney XD reran the show to promote the film.

== Premise ==
The series follows the two chipmunks Chip and Dale who operate a detective agency called Rescue Rangers. The protagonists are joined by their friends Gadget Hackwrench, Monterey Jack, and Zipper. The detectives deal with crimes that are often "too small" for the police to handle, usually with other animals as their clients. The Rescue Rangers frequently find themselves going up against two arch-villains in particular: Mafia-style tabby cat Fat Cat and mad scientist Norton Nimnul.

== Episodes ==
Season	Episodes	Originally released		
Season	Episodes	First released	Last released	Network
1	13	March 4, 1989	May 21, 1989	The Disney Channel
2	47	September 11, 1989	May 2, 1990	Syndication
3	5	September 10, 1990	November 19, 1990	Syndication

Except for the five-part set of episodes made from the pilot movie, each 22-minute episode of the series was self-contained. Plot points introduced in each episode stayed in the episode and any character development didn't appear to continue through to future episodes. Most of the episodes followed a similar format, wherein the next case was presented at the start of the episode, then the bulk of the episode had the sleuths gathering clues and investigating the situation. In the last few minutes of the episode, the case was resolved, usually in dramatic fashion and the final moments would have a humorous wrap-up scene between the Rangers.

== Characters ==
=== Main ===
- Chip (voiced by Tress MacNeille) is the leader of the Rescue Rangers.
- Dale (voiced by Corey Burton) is the co-founder of the Rescue Rangers.
- Monterey Jack (voiced by Peter Cullen in season 1 and Jim Cummings in seasons 2 and 3) is an Australian mouse who serves as the muscle of the Rescue Rangers, but is weak against "cheese attacks" every time he sees or smells cheese.
- Gadget Hackwrench (voiced by Tress MacNeille) is a young blond-haired mouse who is the team's pilot, mechanic, and second-in-command.
- Zipper (voiced by Corey Burton) is a tiny bluish-green housefly and a longtime friend of Monterey Jack.

=== Villains ===
- Aldrin Klordane (voiced by Alan Oppenheimer) is a crime boss and criminal mastermind who was the Rescue Rangers' first opponent.
- Fat Cat (voiced by Jim Cummings) is a grey tabby cat crime boss. He started out as the pet cat of Aldrin Klordane and continued his criminal activities after his master was arrested.
  - Wart (voiced by Jim Cummings impersonating Peter Lorre) is a lizard who is shown to be more intelligent than the rest of Fat Cat's minions.
  - Mole (voiced by Corey Burton) is a slow-witted mole.
  - Mepps (voiced by Peter Cullen) is an orange alley cat.
  - Snout (voiced by Corey Burton impersonating Paul Lynde) is a rat in a turtleneck.
- Professor Norton Nimnul (voiced by Jim Cummings) is the Rangers' other major enemy and a mad scientist who in the Rescue Rangers' earlier days once worked with Aldrin Klordane. Following Klordane's arrest, Professor Nimnul continued his evil plots that are constantly thwarted by the Rescue Rangers. Professor Nimnul has a fear of bats due to the fact that they might suck the blood from his neck.
- Rat Capone (voiced by Jim Cummings impersonating Edward G. Robinson) is a rat crime lord.
  - Arnold Mousenegger (voiced by Brian Cummings) is a mouse who works for Rat Capone.
  - Sugar Ray Lizard (voiced by Chuck McCann) is a lizard who works for Rat Capone.
  - Mikey is Rat Capone's pet piranha.

=== Other characters ===
- Officer Kirby and Officer Muldoon (both voiced by Peter Cullen) are two police officers. Kirby is a buff African-American with black hair and a black moustache and Muldoon is a Caucasian redhead with buckteeth. They would be the ones who arrest Professor Nimnul and any other human bad guy that the Rescue Rangers defeat.
- Detective Donald Drake and K-9 Plato (voiced by Rob Paulsen and Alan Oppenheimer respectively) are soon-to-be retired detective and police dog of the police force. After being framed and incarcerated by Fat Cat, Detective Drake and K-9 are released upon their innocence being proven and helped to arrest Aldrin Klordane.
- Sergeant Spinelli (voiced by Jim Cummings) is Kirby and Muldoon's superior officer.

== Production ==
Rescue Rangers was originally conceived as the first of three new companion shows to Disney's popular DuckTales series, which had more than doubled the ratings among child audiences in its time slots after its debut in the fall of 1987. Disney had originally invested $20 million in DuckTales and then invested $28 million in Chip 'n Dale: Rescue Rangers.

It, along with TaleSpin and a third series, Double-O Duck (which ultimately became Darkwing Duck), would round out a programming block later known as "The Disney Afternoon" along with the previously established Disney's Adventures of the Gummi Bears to capitalize on DuckTales's success.

When Tad Stones first came up with the idea for the Rescue Rangers series, Chip and Dale were not part of the show. He initially pitched doing a TV series based on The Rescuers, but Disney rejected that idea as a sequel to that film was already in production. He created a new concept with the working title of Metro Mice. The original draft starred an Indiana Jones-type mouse named Kit Colby who sported a fedora and a fluffy collared leather jacket, and the rest of the team included a chameleon, an earlier version of Gadget and a character resembling Monterey Jack with a different name. When he proposed the show in a meeting with Michael Eisner and Jeffrey Katzenberg, the idea was well received except for the character of Kit. At Eisner's suggestion, they replaced him with the chipmunk duo to give the show some established Disney characters to work with. By late 1987, two years before its television debut, the show was announced under its original proposed title of "Chip 'n Dale and the Rescue Rangers".

While Chip and Dale were established characters, in order to bring them into the series only their general appearance and basic personality traits were kept. Unlike their appearances in Disney shorts, the Rescue Rangers features the chipmunk duo as very verbal, with Chip voiced by Tress MacNeille and Dale voiced by Corey Burton. Audio processing was used to speed up the voice recordings and give the voices a higher pitch, particularly Chip's. The pair were given clothes—Chip the clothing of the original-concept Kit, while the goofier Dale was reminiscent of, but not specifically modeled after, Thomas Magnum from Magnum, P.I. with his Hawaiian shirt.

The series premiered in March 1989 on The Disney Channel before moving into a regular slot in syndication in September of that year. A year later, in September 1990, the series became part of the newly-launched lineup The Disney Afternoon, where it ran new episodes until November of that year, and reruns until 1993. On October 2, 1995, Chip 'n Dale: Rescue Rangers began reruns on The Disney Channel as part of a two-hour programming block called "Block Party", airing weekdays in the late afternoon/early evening and which also included Darkwing Duck, TaleSpin and DuckTales.

The show's opening theme was written (listed in the end credits as "words & music") by Mark Mueller, an ASCAP Award-winning pop music songwriter who also wrote the popular DuckTales theme song, and produced by Alf Clausen. The song performed over the title credits is sung by Jeff Pescetto (who also performed the DuckTales theme song). A full-length theme song was recorded by The Jets, a Minnesota pop group, and released on The Disney Afternoon soundtrack.

== Home media ==
=== United Kingdom VHS releases ===
On November 6, 1989, Walt Disney Home Video released episodes from the series on video, containing a pair of episodes each.

VHS name	Episode titles	Release date
Crimebusters	"Catteries Not Included" & "Piratsy Under the Seas"	November 6, 1989

=== North American VHS releases ===
Between 1989 and 1990, Walt Disney Home Video released 10 episodes from the series on five VHS cassettes in North America, containing a pair of episodes each.

VHS name	Episode titles	Release date
Double Trouble	"Dale Beside Himself" & "Flash the Wonder Dog"	September 28, 1989
Crimebusters	"Catteries Not Included" & "Piratsy Under the Seas"	September 28, 1989
Undercover Critters	"Adventures in Squirrelsitting" & "Three Men and a Booby"	September 28, 1989
Danger Rangers	"Kiwi's Big Adventure" & "Bearing Up Baby"	August 14, 1990
Super Sleuths	"Pound of the Baskervilles" & "Out to Launch"	August 14, 1990

Additionally, on October 1, 1993, the episode "Ghost of a Chance" was released together with the Goof Troop episode "Hallow-Weenies" on one VHS cassette as a special release called Boo-Busters and the episode "Good Times, Bat Times" was released together with the Darkwing Duck episode "Ghoul of My Dreams" on one VHS cassette as a special release called Witcheroo!

Several other episodes were available on international releases.

==== Australia and New Zealand releases ====
Eleven VHS cassettes containing 23 episodes of the series were released in Australia and New Zealand.

VHS name	Episode titles	Release date
Chip 'n Dale Rescue Rangers (Volume 1): Crimebusters	"Catteries Not Included" & "Piratsy Under the Seas"	November 6, 1989 (UK) / September 11, 1992
Chip 'n Dale Rescue Rangers (Volume 2): The Pound of the Baskervilles	"Pound of the Baskervilles" & "Adventures in Squirrelsitting"	September 11, 1992
Chip 'n Dale Rescue Rangers (Volume 3): Risky Beesness	"Bearing Up Baby" & "Risky Beesness"	September 11, 1992
Chip 'n Dale Rescue Rangers (Volume 4): Romancing the Clone	"Dale Beside Himself" & "Flash the Wonder Dog"	September 11, 1992
Chip 'n Dale Rescue Rangers (Volume 5): Astro Nuts	"The Carpetsnaggers" & "Out to Launch"	September 11, 1992
Chip 'n Dale Rescue Rangers (Volume 6): 3 Men and a Birdie	"Three Men and a Booby", "Parental Discretion Retired" & "Chocolate Chips"	April 2, 1993
Chip 'n Dale Rescue Rangers (Volume 7): Ghouls and Jewels	"Ghost of a Chance" & "A Wolf in Cheap Clothing"	April 2, 1993
Chip 'n Dale Rescue Rangers (Volume 8): Half-Size Heroes	"A Lad in a Lamp" & "Seer No Evil"	April 2, 1993
Chip 'n Dale Rescue Rangers (Volume 9): Flies in Disguise	"When You Wish Upon A Star" & "Chipwrecked Shipmunk"	September 10, 1993
Chip 'n Dale Rescue Rangers (Volume 10): Danger Rangers	"Out of Scale", "Kiwi's Big Adventure" & "Gorilla My Dreams"	September 10, 1993
Chip 'n Dale Rescue Rangers (Volume 11): Duelling Dale	"Mind Your Cheese and Q's", "The S.S. Drainpipe" & "A Creep in the Deep"	September 10, 1993

=== DVD releases ===
==== North America (Region 1) ====
Walt Disney Studios Home Entertainment did a partial release of the television show on DVD, comprising nearly 80% of its episodes; two volumes were released in Region 1, featuring the first 51 episodes of the series. The first volume was released on November 8, 2005 (containing episodes 1–27) and the second volume on November 14, 2006 (containing episodes 28–51). The episodes on the first volume are arranged in production order, while the episodes on the second volume are arranged by original air date. The sets were originally packaged in a box containing 3 slipcases, one for each disc. Both volumes were reissued in standard-sized DVD cases in 2013. Disney never released a third volume set for episodes 52–65, leaving the series incomplete on DVD (unlike its Blu-ray complete series counterpart, released in 2022).

DVD name	Ep #	Release date
Chip 'n Dale Rescue Rangers: Volume 1	27	November 8, 2005
Chip 'n Dale Rescue Rangers: Volume 2	24	November 14, 2006

==== International (Region 2) ====
In the United Kingdom, Disney released one Region 2 volume in 2007, titled Chip 'n Dale - Rescue Rangers - First Collection. Despite the set being similar to the US version, it contained only 20 episodes, while having 6 language tracks: English, French, Italian, German, Spanish and Dutch. Several other similar releases were then made to other countries, but only going up to episode #20. On December 5, 2012, a second DVD set of the series was released in the UK, but as a Region 2 version of Volume 2, titled Chip 'n Dale Rescue Rangers Season 2. Unlike the first DVD set, this 3-disc set includes a Fastplay mode and only two language tracks: English and German, but subtitles have not been added. As of yet, there are no announced plans to release the rest of the series, or the seven episodes missing between the first two sets.

DVD name	Ep #	Release date	Language
Walt Disney's Chip 'n Dale Rescue Rangers – First Collection	20	February 12, 2007	English, French, Italian, German, Spanish and Dutch
Walt Disney's Chip 'n Dale Rescue Rangers – Season 2	24	December 5, 2012	English and German

==== Video on demand ====
The series was released on Amazon Video in 2013 and was free for Amazon Prime members. However, it was unavailable for some time. The series was brought back to Amazon Instant Video in the United States in 2016, being currently available for purchase in SD and HD.

The complete series is also currently available for purchase in SD and HD on iTunes and Google Play (Volume 2 on Google Play is only available in SD), also released in 2016.

The complete series was released alongside the release of Disney's streaming service Disney+ on November 12, 2019. There, it is cropped to 16:9 widescreen format, unlike the Blu-ray release (which retains its original aspect ratio).

=== Blu-ray release ===
Walt Disney Studios Home Entertainment released the complete series on Blu-ray Disc in 2022, on a multi-region, high definition six-disc set, keeping its original image ratio (1.33:1). All episodes have been scanned from the original 35mm film negatives, except episode 32 of season 2, "Prehysterical Pet", whose negatives could not be located (the episode on disc was upscaled from standard definition tape). Episode are not sorted by their original airing date order nor in some cases chronological story order (e.g., the pilot episodes "Rescue Rangers to the Rescue - parts 1-5" are on disc 4). The release omits a listing of the 65 episode names, as they're not physically printed on the discs, paper insert or cover.

Blu-ray name	Ep #	Release date
Walt Disney's Chip 'n Dale Rescue Rangers – The Complete Series	65	February 15, 2022

== Reception ==
=== Critical reception ===
Hal Erickson of Television Cartoon Shows, An Illustrated Encyclopedia compared the show to DuckTales, stating that it was "consummately produced and written," and its animation "succeeded in putting most other overseas output to shame." Emily Ashby of Common Sense Media rated the series 4 out of 5 stars, complimented the depiction of positive messages, citing teamwork and saying the series succeeds to depict a female character as a role model, while finding the show family-friendly and entertaining. IGN named Chip 'n Dale: Rescue Rangers as the 60th-best in the Top 100 Animated TV Shows. Jeremy Hayes of BuzzFeed ranked Chip 'n Dale: Rescue Rangers 4th in their "Best Cartoons From The '80s" list. Tyler B. Searle of Collider included in their "10 Best Animated Disney Channel Shows" list.

=== Accolades ===
The show was nominated at the 17th Daytime Emmy Awards for Outstanding Animated Program.

== Other media ==
The Rescue Rangers make an minor appearance in the 2017 reboot of DuckTales episode "Double-O-Duck in You Only Crash Twice!", the Rescue Rangers are escaped laboratory test animals granted sentience by an intelligence ray created by the criminal syndicate F.O.W.L.'s scientist Black Heron (voiced by April Winchell), where Launchpad McQuack (voiced by Beck Bennett) absent-mindedly helps them escape. They return the favor when he battles Steelbeak in one of the episode's climactic scenes. Upon them leaving, he tells them "Thanks for the rescue!".

They make appearance in "The Last Adventure!" where they are revealed to be some of the many adventurers, or adventure related people, to have been captured by F.O.W.L. for eradication. They, along with numerous other characters, give encouragement to Launchpad when he is up against Steelbeak and his brainwashed allies. Afterwards, they are seen along with the other freed heroes to watch Bradford Buzzard's defeat.

=== Merchandise ===
In fall of 1989, McDonald's produced a series of Chip 'n Dale: Rescue Rangers themed Happy Meal that included toy versions of the main characters riding small vehicles. Scenes from the series were incorporated into the TV commercials advertising the Happy Meals. Ice cream versions of Chip 'n Dale were made by Good Humor.

=== Theme parks ===
- In January 1993, a junior roller coaster called Gadget's Go Coaster debuted as part of Mickey's Toontown in Disneyland. In April 1996, a similar attraction opened in Tokyo Disneyland.
- In 2023, a newly orchestrated instrumental version of the Chip 'n Dale: Rescue Rangers theme song was added as part of the new music for the refurbished Mickey's Toontown in Disneyland.

=== Comic books ===
Chip 'n Dale: Rescue Rangers

Publication information
- Publisher: Disney Comics
- Publication date: June 1990 – December 1991
- No. of issues: 19

A monthly comic book based on the show was published by Disney Comics in 1990, that ran for 19 issues. Subsequent comic stories were printed in Disney Adventures from 1990 to 1995, as well as in the Disney Afternoon comic book published by Marvel Comics. They also had a series from Boom Studios that was published for 8 issues from December 2010 to June 2011.

==== BOOM! revival ====
Chip 'n Dale: Rescue Rangers

Publication information
- Publisher: Boom! Studios
- Publication date: September 2010 – May 2011
- No. of issues: 8

From September 2010, Chip 'n Dale: Rescue Rangers was revived by comics publisher Boom! Studios, as an ongoing monthly series slated to begin in December of the same year. This choice was based on the extreme and unexpected popularity of Darkwing Duck, another Disney Afternoon property which BOOM! revived earlier in 2010. The series featured comics writer Ian Brill, and artist Leonel Castellani.

Eight issues were published, collecting the two 4-part stories into two trade paperback books. The comic series was cancelled May 2011, to be replaced by the launch of DuckTales.

The Boom! Studios series was reprinted in IDW Publishing's Disney's Afternoon Giant in October 2018.

== Video games ==
- In 1990, Capcom released a video game based on the series called Chip 'n Dale Rescue Rangers for Nintendo Entertainment System. It is a platform game distinguishable by the player needing to grab boxes, carry them on top and throwing to attack enemies and sometimes clear or form the path. It features a 2-player cooperative mode, and allows some non-linearity in choosing levels on a map. Each level is a various location of the city. In the story the Rangers must stop another of Fat Cat's schemes. The ongoing is described by dialogues between levels.
- A second NES game, Chip 'n Dale Rescue Rangers 2, was released by Capcom in 1993. The sequel is the same in the principle of picking and throwing boxes, features additional incentives for cooperative play such as mini-games, that can only be played by two players, and the ability to throw the partner as a weapon.
- An unofficial Mega Drive sequel to these games, titled Squirrel King, was produced by the Taiwanese developer Gamtec. This game was later the basis of the unofficial Mega Drive Super Mario World game.
- Also released in 1990, Hi Tech Expressions' PC game Chip 'n Dale Rescue Rangers: The Adventures in Nimnul's Castle saw the Rangers having to rescue Monterey Jack, who is caught in a mousetrap in Professor Norton Nimnul's castle. To rescue him, the chipmunks must infiltrate the castle to collect various parts so Gadget can build a flying machine to reach Monterey Jack.
- A Chip 'n Dale: Rescue Rangers hand-held LCD game was released by Tiger Electronics in 1990.

=== Other games ===
- Chip, Dale, Gadget and Zipper appeared on cards which were in the 1993's puzzle game Mickey's Memory Challenge.
- Chip and Dale (in their Rescue Rangers outfits) are playable characters in the 2000s racing game Walt Disney World Quest: Magical Racing Tour.
- The Rescue Rangers are playable characters in the mobile games Disney Emoji Blitz and Disney Sorcerer's Arena.
- Gadget Hackwrench makes an only-playable character in the game Disney Tsum Tsum and Disney Heroes: Battle Mode.

== Film ==
A animated/live-action CGI feature-length film of the same name directed by Akiva Schaffer; written by Dan Gregor and Doug Mand; produced by David Hoberman and Todd Lieberman; and starring John Mulaney and Andy Samberg as the voices of Chip and Dale was released on May 20, 2022, on Disney+. The film also stars Eric Bana and Dennis Haysbert as the voices of Monterey Jack and Zipper while both Tress MacNeille and Corey Burton reprise their roles of Gadget and Zipper as well as Chip and Dale for a brief scene.

== The Mouse Watch series ==
The Mouse Watch

Publication information
- Format: Children's novel series
- Genre: Action

Creative team
- Written by: J.J. Gilbert

A children's novel spin-off series titled The Mouse Watch written and illustrated by J.J. Gilbert.

The Mouse Watch follows the adventures of a daring 12-year-old mouse Bernadette "Bernie" Skampersky, who joins the Mouse Watch, an elite group of high-tech international crimefighters/do-gooders organized by older Gadget Hackwrench. With help of a nerdy teenage rat Jarvis Slinktail, together they work as a team to solve big problems with versus the Rogue Animal Thieves Society (R.A.T.S.), using small gadgets.

The first novel of the same name was released on November 3, 2020, the second novel The Mouse Watch Underwater released on May 4, 2021, and the third novel The Mouse Watch in Space released on May 24, 2022.
