= Earl Heikka =

American sculptor (1910-1941)

- Born: May 3, 1910; Belt, Montana, U.S.
- Died: May 18, 1941 (aged 31); Great Falls, Montana, U.S.
- Education: Great Falls High School
- Occupation: Sculptor
- Spouse: Virginia Middleton
- Children: 4

Earl Heikka (May 3, 1910 – May 18, 1941) was an American sculptor. He designed figurines and statues of the Old West, miners, and horses. He committed suicide at age 31.

== Early life ==
Heikka was born on May 3, 1910, in Belt, Montana. Both his parents were immigrants from Finland. His father, who served as an alderman in Belt, died when Heikka was four, and the latter grew up in Great Falls, Montana. Heikka graduated from the Great Falls High School.

== Career ==
Heikka opened his first studio on actor Gary Cooper's ranch in 1929. He was introduced to William Andrews Clark, III, the grandson of mining magnate William A. Clark, by Cooper in 1930. It was thanks to Clark that Heikka exhibited his work at the Stendahl Galleries in the Ambassador Hotel, Los Angeles in 1931. Heikka subsequently exhibited his work in Dallas, Texas in 1936, and at the Golden Gate International Exposition in San Francisco in 1939.

W. A. Clark III, like many Montana businessmen, collected his work. For Cornelius F. Kelley, the chairman of the Anaconda Copper Mining Company, Heikka designed a six-foot statue of a miner entering a tunnel; the work was installed at his private residence on Long Island. Others received a sculpture from Heikka through barter; Heikka often gave his artwork to pay back his debts in local stores.

Heikka designed figurines of the Old West, including Native Americans, cowboys, horses, and mules. He also did figurines of miners, and nativity scenes. Heikka often did sketches or oil or watercolor paintings before designing his statues, and at least one sculpture was based on a sketch by Charles M. Russell. According to the Great Falls Tribune, "Heikka had made a name for himself in national art circles, particularly with his modeling depicting picturesque phases of the old west. Combined with the lifelike rendition of the subjects was a careful attention to historical accuracy of all detail."

== Personal life, death and legacy ==
Heikka married Virginia Middleton in 1933. They had four children, and they resided in Great Falls. Heikka was a member of Christian Science.

Heikka took up drinking shortly after his brother Mike's death. In May 1941, he had an argument with his wife, who left him and moved into her parents' house with their children. A few days later, on May 18, 1941, Heikka drove up to their house and committed suicide by shooting himself in the heart inside his car. His Christian Science funeral was held at the W. H. George Chapel two days later.

Some of Heikka's work is in the permanent collection of the C. M. Russell Museum Complex in Great Falls and the Hockaday Museum of Art in Kalispell. The Earl E. Heikka Museum at 2222 Central Avenue West, Great Falls, opened in 1995.
