= Earl Young (architect) =

American architect (1889–1975)

Earl A. Young
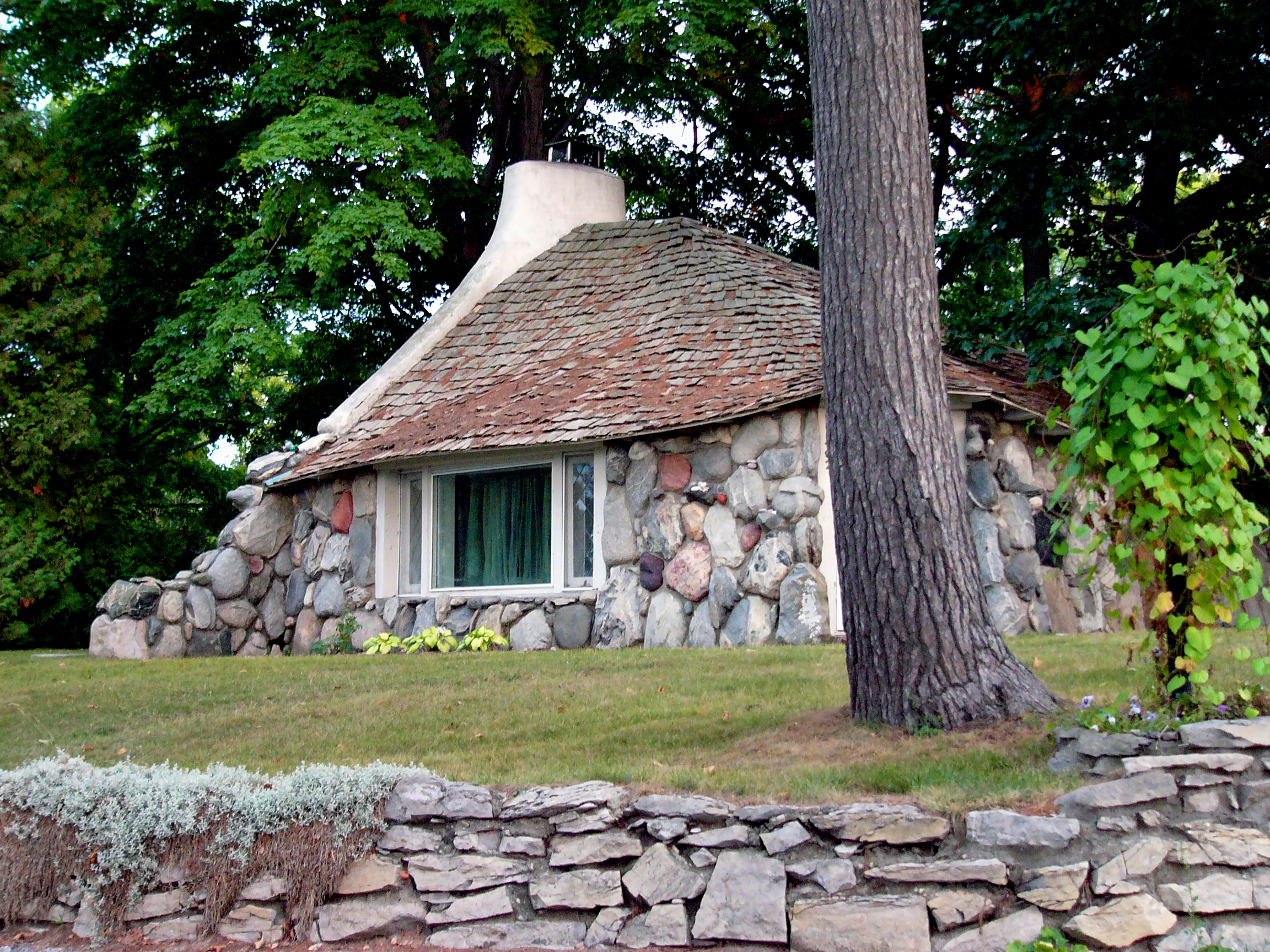
- "Half House", a stone house built by Young in Charlevoix.
- Born: March 31, 1889; Mancelona, Michigan
- Died: May 24, 1975 (aged 86); East Jordan, Michigan
- Occupation: Architect
- Spouse: Irene Harsha

Earl A. Young (March 31, 1889 – May 24, 1975) was an American architectural designer, realtor, and insurance agent. Over a span of 52 years, he designed and built 31 structures in Charlevoix, Michigan, but was never a registered architect. He worked mostly in stone, using limestone, fieldstone, and boulders he found throughout Northern Michigan. The homes are commonly referred to as gnome homes, mushroom houses, or Hobbit houses. His door, window, roof, and fireplace designs were distinct because of his use of curved lines. Young's goal was to show that a small stone house could be as impressive as a castle. Young also helped make Charlevoix the busy summer-resort town that it is today.

== Early life ==
Earl Young was born in Mancelona, Michigan in 1889 to parents Adolf and Myrtie Young. He moved to Charlevoix at 11 years old where his father set up an insurance business. As a teenager, Young was interested in photography and taught himself photofinishing. He took many photos in Charlevoix, of both the city and the woods. In high school, he was on the skating team and the track team. During his senior year, Young was coeditor of his school's newspaper with Irene Harsha, who would later become his wife. In 1908, he enrolled in the School of Architecture at the University of Michigan. He was influenced by Frank Lloyd Wright's idea that buildings should respect their surroundings. Young was discouraged by the classic Greek, Roman, and Victorian architecture he was learning about and left school after only one year.

That was the last time Young would have any formal schooling. He joined his family's insurance business, which soon expanded to include realty. For the rest of his life, he would say he was a realtor and would tell people that he had held his realtor's license for 60 years. In the same building as the insurance agency, Young also ran a photofinishing business and sold bread. During this time, he continued to learn about architecture and construction by reading books and magazines and talking to construction workers and stonemasons. On February 14, 1914, Myrtie Young died and Earl was left alone in the family business.

On September 21, 1915, Young married Irene Harsha, his high school sweetheart. He joked that he married her to "keep her on his staff." Over the next 11 years their family grew to include four children: Drew, Marguerite, Louise, and Virginia.

Young developed some peculiar habits very early and they continued with him throughout his career. He was a difficult designer to deal with. He never made blueprints; workers were lucky to get a rough sketch that was refined by Irene. Young also never thought about practicality, making very short doorways and kitchens like hallways. He was an on-the-spot designer and said the stones spoke to him. When asked which building was his favorite, Young would always respond, "The next one."

== First homes ==
Earl Young had been studying the houses in Charlevoix County for years. He believed that these houses could be mixed up and put back on any plot of land with no consequences. He wanted to build homes that fit into their landscape following a philosophy shared by Frank Lloyd Wright. From 1918 to 1921, he worked on his first building at 304 Park Avenue in the city of Charlevoix. It was built mostly of stone with a few wooden details and an Arts and Crafts influence. This home respected the contours of the land and contained the first of his celebrated stone fireplaces. He built it for his family to live in.

In 1920, he built a new insurance office for himself. It was called the Apple Tree Building after the tree that grew behind it. The building had to be removed in 2003, but the fireplace was saved.

Young bought a large piece of land in Charlevoix on Lake Michigan from Mary Bartholomew in 1924. He partitioned the land into 85 lots, only three of which were rectangular, and began advertising it as Boulder Park. Lots started at $100 and the first floor of any house that was built had to be made of stone, brick, or stucco. Young designed and built ten homes in Boulder Park, although it is a common misconception that he built all of the homes there since many homeowners had their houses commissioned "in the style of" Earl Young.

From 1927 to 1930, he worked on a house with green mortar between the stones. It was heavily influenced by Frank Lloyd Wright and was the first of Young's homes to have a deemphasized, almost hidden entryway. At the same time, he worked on a house made of rough stone with his first remarkable chimney; the chimney seemed to be made of randomly placed stones and the top of it appeared to be frosted with snow. Both homes have a door and stairs that face the road but no walkway that leads to them.

The next home Young built resembled an English cottage. It was built between 1928 and 1929 with flat white stones and white mortar. Its rolled eaves are the first clue to the undulating roofs Young would later construct.

From 1929 to 1930, Young built two homes. The first was made mostly of stones with red mortar between them. The stucco gables playfully have eight stones "tossed" into them. This is the only home he built without a sheltered entrance. The second of the two homes has a distinct Swiss chalet influence.

In 1930, Herman Panama commissioned a home made of cobblestone from Young. The house is called The Norman Panama House after Herman Panama's son, a Hollywood producer, writer, and director. Local legend has it that the house was a place written in and about in some his films, such as White Christmas.

Young designed a home called The Owl House, which was constructed from 1930 to 1931. The house was made entirely of granite. It received its name from the two round windows on its front that resemble eyes.

The Enchanted Cottage was built next. It is the only structure that Young built but did not design. This is evident because the house has many straight lines and right angles, unlike Young's other homes. Mr. and Mrs. Cross convinced Young to build the house based on House Pattern 357 from Ladies' Home Journal (which at the time was a leader, along with other home-centered magazines, in popularizing architects and architectural plans). He gave it his own touch with a stone exterior and a slight change to the dormer windows.

Soon after, Young bought The Golden Rule, a sailboat, from a friend. Young convinced the Coast Guard to haul it out in front Boulder Park and beach it. Its only purpose was to act as a conversation piece, although, Lake Michigan's rough summer waves and harsh icy winters soon demolished the boat.

Young's next home was The Pagoda House, finished in 1935. Constructed of limestone, it had Oriental, Gothic and Swiss influences. This was the last home he built in Boulder Park.

== Boulder Manor ==
Building Boulder Manor was considered the turning point in Earl Young's architecture career. It is the most well known home in Boulder Park. For years Young had saved boulders, both physically and mentally. He had the ability to remember the dimension and colors of hundred of boulders at the same time, over the span of many years. He dug up the boulders he liked, sometimes having to purchase them. He hid them underground, deep in the woods, or in Lake Michigan. Many of these boulders came together when he started building Boulder Manor for his family in the fall of 1928. He built a playhouse in the backyard which is basically a miniature replica of the main house. His daughters and their friends played inside while he oversaw work on the big house. The playhouse has a working fireplace and electricity. In 1929, however, the Great Depression hit and Young had to sell the unfinished house to the bank.

For many years he worked on other homes and on December 9, 1937, he regained possession of Boulder Manor, finishing it in 1939. The fireplace is composed of six massive boulders that form a trapezoid-shaped mantel. The front of the house is dominated by an arched window that gives a spectacular view of Lake Michigan. One stone on the south side of the house juts up into the vinyl siding, fusing the two materials together to create one cohesive building.

== Later homes ==
Young purchased a triangular piece of land between Park Avenue, Grant Street, and Clinton Street. Many of his next houses were built either here or nearby. Abide was the first of these homes. It had even fewer straight lines than its predecessors, which was especially apparent in the roof. Young liked to say that he "built roofs and then shoved the houses underneath." Because he refused to cut down trees on the property, they looked like they grew around the house. Abide has Young's first fireplace made of Onaway stone.

Around this time, Young convinced the community to demolish buildings that blocked the view of Round Lake from Bridge Street. The four block area was turned into a park that is still used.

In 1943, Tide Beside Abide — or Betide — was constructed. It sits far back from Park Avenue and drops down the back of the hill. This makes the home look three times smaller from the front than it actually is.

In 1945, Young constructed a cottage across from Abide. It had a thatched roof imported from Europe, whitewashed stones, and dark wood. The roof was later changed to shingles to make maintenance easier, and the whitewash was removed from the stones.

When Young's children moved out, he built a new home for himself and Irene at 306 Park Avenue. The house is made of Onaway stone and the roof mimics the swells of the hills surrounding it. The fireplace is composed of more Onaway stone and the horizontal and vertical pieces come together to make two diagonal lines. Diagonal lines on fireplaces proved to become more pronounced on his later buildings. Young lived here for almost 30 years.

Young's smallest building, Half House, was finished in 1947. It has a steep, wavy roof and stops flat on the East side with a high chimney.

The next home was created for Speedway 79 founder William Sucher in 1948. Young walked the land with Sucher and his wife and at one spot stopped and told them: "From this spot I want you to see one third sky, one third water, and one third grass." This type of behavior was not unusual for Young.

In 1951, Young built what is now the most photographed home in Charlevoix, which the owner calls Boulderdash. It was modeled after a button mushroom. It is said that the exact square footage cannot be determined because the floor plan is so irregular. The boulder walls are three feet thick and the undulating roof had to be completed twice because the first time the shingles were put on in neat rows, not the chaotic, sweeping billows Young wanted. The lead glass windows were originally in a Polish castle.

Between 1952 and 1962 Young remodeled three homes, usually adding stone to the fireplace and to the exterior of the homes. At the same time, he also constructed two homes, one of which was for the mayor of Charlevoix.

== The Weathervane ==
Young tore down an old mill to create The Weathervane Inn, which opened in 1955. The restaurant houses five fireplaces; the main one in the dining room is topped by a 18,260 pounds (9 short tons) boulder found by Young 26 years before. The boulder is similar in shape to Michigan's lower peninsula and Young felt the lines bisecting it looked like the highways crisscrossing through the land. An 18,260 pound stone, the first time the boulder was put in place, the floor sank under the weight. The roof of The Weathervane Inn mimics the outstretched wings of a seagull in flight. The gull motif is also found in fireplaces in The Weathervane compound and a few houses.

The Weathervane Lodge opened in August 1959. The square, two-story building houses 37 units and is still in use today, but is known simply as The Lodge. At the time, it was the only two-storey motel with a passenger elevator. For the Weathervane Terrace Motel, Young seems to have drawn influence from nearby Castle Farms, but he never admitted it. Young experienced financial difficulties during construction, but the motel was finished in 1965. The main fireplace features red, gold and black stone. The fireplace in the breakfast room is made of five huge stones that fit together like a perfect puzzle. Young sold off the Weathervane buildings in 1968 but retained his office for the rest of his life.

== Other projects ==
In 1967, Young started working on land that faced Round Lake. He called the area Thistle Downs. The first home here was an A-frame with very little stone on the exterior. The stairway was constructed with discs cut from a single log. The flamboyant main fireplace uses the same stylized gulls as The Weathervane, and includes artistic homages to local landmarks. A red sandstone house was built in 1969, and bulldozed in 1994. From 1970 to 1973 Young worked on The Castle House, his last completed design. Today, it has been incorporated into a much larger home but still retains its Earl Young flair.

One house was constructed outside of Charlevoix. After much pestering Young built the Suchers another house in Alma, Michigan. It is made of Onaway stone and the fireplace is a full wall of diagonal lines.

In the 1930s Young dragged a 40-short-ton (80,000 lb) boulder out in front of Boulder Park. Forty years later, he upended it where it sits today, proclaiming the beginning of Boulder Park.

== Later life ==
Young went to his office every day. He continued to find new boulders, sketch ideas, and dream. At 86 years of age, he slipped on a patch of ice and broke his hip. Young died on May 24, 1975, at a medical facility in East Jordan, Michigan.

== Style ==
Young constructed homes during the Mid-Century modern era of architecture. This era is known for integrating nature into the houses, as Young always did. He would work around trees instead of cutting them down and wanted the houses to be a harmonious part of the landscape instead of destroying or overshadowing it. His architecture from this time features open, flowing floor plans and the beginning of post and beam structures with light, glass walls. Many of Young's homes have open floor plans but the stone walls never feel delicate. Like other buildings from the period, the stone houses are less formal than their predecessors. This informality is mainly shown by the lack of straight lines. The largest difference between Young's homes and those of his contemporaries is who the houses are designed for. Other homes were built for the contemporary American family and their needs, but Young built only for himself. His awkward, hallway-like kitchens have been remodeled in many homes to make them more accommodating as they were unworkable, something that Young did not care about or understand. Young is often compared to Frank Lloyd Wright because of his integration with nature and his stubborn attitude, but critics have never formally compared the two architects.

Another influence deeply interwoven is Storybook-style architecture, which gained popularity in the 1920s. It "mimics rural European vernacular architecture and often uses found or recycled material (including architectural pieces recovered from the homes of Chicago lumber barons), or carefully weathered new material." The wavy roofs connected uneven rafters with lath or sheathing, and multiple layers of cedar shakes. "Another Storybook Style feature often employed by Young is the squat, cartoonish chimney that appears to be sagging and dripping with gingerbread-house frosting."

There is no escaping that Young had an 'organic' relationship with the stones he used in his architecture: so much so that it was roofs and boulders that shaped his work. The result has been described as "lithotecture".

== Tours and museum exhibits ==
Mushroom House Tours of Charlevoix run by Edith Pair offer daily GEM car tours of 28 Earl Young houses, 7 days a week 10:00-4:00 p.m. during the tourist season. Personal exterior-only tours are available, and it is possible to rent a few of these homes.

The Charlevoix Historical Society's Harsha House Museum, 103 State Street, has an Earl Young exhibit.

It is said that these are high maintenance houses, which require loving care and constant refurbishment.

== See also ==
- Earth house
