= Forward compatibility =

Type of design interoperability

Forward compatibility or upward compatibility is a design characteristic that allows a system to accept input intended for a later version of itself. The concept can be applied to entire systems, electrical interfaces, telecommunication signals, data communication protocols, file formats, and programming languages. A standard supports forward compatibility if a product that complies with earlier versions can "gracefully" process input designed for later versions of the standard, ignoring new parts which it does not understand.

The W3C's Technical Architecture Group (TAG) defines the concept more formally: "a change in the definition of a language is forward compatible if consumers of the original language can correctly process text written for the evolved version of the language".

The objective for forward-compatible technology is for old devices to recognise when data has been generated for new devices.

Forward compatibility for the older system usually means backward compatibility for the new system, i.e. the ability to process data from the old system; the new system usually has full compatibility with the older one, by being able to both process and generate data in the format of the older system.

Forward compatibility is not the same as extensibility. A forward compatible design can process at least some of the data from a future version of itself. An extensible design makes upgrading easy. An example of both design ideas can be found in web browsers. At any point in time, a current browser is forward-compatible if it gracefully accepts a newer version of HTML, whereas how easily the browser code can be upgraded to process the newer HTML determines how extensible it is.

== Design principles ==
The W3C Technical Architecture Group has documented a family of substitution rules that enable forward-compatible language design. Each rule specifies how a consumer should behave when it encounters constructs it does not recognize:

- Must ignore unknowns — a consumer that encounters an unrecognized construct must continue processing, treating the construct as if it were not there.
- Must accept and discard unknowns — a consumer must accept unknown constructs at defined extension points and then discard them.
- Must accept and preserve unknowns — a consumer must accept unknown constructs and, when forwarding or transforming the content, preserve them for downstream consumers.

These rules underlie forward compatibility in widely deployed languages and protocols. HTTP/1.1, for example, specifies that unrecognized header fields should be ignored by the recipient and must be forwarded by transparent proxies — a direct application of the "preserve unknowns" rule.

== Examples ==
=== Telecommunication standards ===
The introduction of FM stereo transmission, or color television, allowed forward compatibility, since monophonic FM radio receivers and black-and-white TV sets still could receive a signal from a new transmitter. It also allowed backward compatibility since new receivers could receive monophonic or black-and-white signals generated by old transmitters.

=== Video gaming ===
- The Game Boy is able to play certain games released for the Game Boy Color. These games utilize the same cartridge design as games for the original Game Boy, though the plastic used is typically black rather than gray and feature the GBC's logo on the label and packaging; Nintendo officially referred to such titles as being "Dual Mode".
- The Leapster is able to play Leapster L-Max games, and the Leapster L-Max is able to play Leapster2 games.
- The original PlayStation is compatible with the DualShock 2 controller. Likewise the PlayStation 3 can be played with a DualShock 4 and DualSense controller.
- The Neo Geo Pocket was able to play most games from Neo Geo Pocket Color.
- The WonderSwan is able to play some WonderSwan Color games.
- The Xbox One can use the controller from the Xbox Series X and Xbox Series S, and likewise an Xbox One controller will work on the Xbox Series X and Series S.
- The V.Smile Smartridge is compatible with every VTech console and handheld game system. However, it does not support the V.Smile Baby, PC Pal, and V.Flash systems. Depending on the device inserted, some functions may be limited, reflecting the varied capabilities of each console.
- The Nintendo Switch can play digital and physical "Nintendo Switch 2 Edition" games. On the Nintendo Switch 2, these versions include both the base game and an upgrade pack, which have better performance, graphics, extra content (the latter of which is usually specific to select first party games), and more. However, the upgrade packs themselves won't run on the original Nintendo Switch, only the base game.

=== HTML ===
HTML is designed to treat all tags in the same way (as inert, unstyled inline elements) unless their appearance or behavior is overridden; either by the browser's default settings, or by scripts or styles included in the page. This makes most new features degrade gracefully in older browsers. One case where this did not work as intended was script and style blocks, whose contents are meant to be interpreted by the browser instead of being part of the page. Such cases were dealt with by enclosing the contents within comment blocks. More generally, HTML's forward compatibility follows a "must ignore" design: early HTML specifications required that unrecognized start and end tags be mapped to nothing during tokenization, which is what allowed later elements such as <img> to be introduced without breaking existing browsers.

As there is no mandatory upgrade of computers or web browsers, many web developers use a graceful degradation or progressive enhancement approach, attempting to make newly created websites that are compatible with older computers and web browsers, usable when JavaScript is disabled or on a slower connection, while still taking advantage of faster hardware and better JavaScript support in more modern web browsers, when available.

=== Optical media ===
Each of the three most common 12 cm optical media formats (CD, DVD, and Blu-ray) was first released in read-only form years before writable forms were available. Within each format, there is both forward and backward compatibility, in that most older read-only drives and players can read (but not write) writable media in the same format, while read/write drives can read (but not write) old read-only media. There is no forward compatibility between formats; a CD player, for instance, can't read a DVD (a newer format), not even the audio tracks. There may be backward compatibility for better marketability (such as a DVD player playing an audio CD), but it is not intrinsic to the standards.

== Relation to the robustness principle ==
Forward-compatible design is closely related to the robustness principle articulated by Jon Postel in RFC 761 (January 1980): "be conservative in what you do, be liberal in what you accept from others". The "liberal in what you accept" half of the principle describes the stance that a forward-compatible system takes toward unrecognized input; the "must ignore unknowns" rule can be read as a specific implementation of it.

Formally defining forward compatibility has nonetheless proven difficult. Members of the W3C Technical Architecture Group treated the definition of forward and backward compatibility as an open problem in 2007, in part because the concept describes a relationship to future versions of a language that do not yet exist.

== Not upwardly compatible ==
Some products are not designed to be forward compatible, which has been referred to as NUC (not upwardly compatible). In some cases this might be intentional by the designers as a form of vendor lock-in or software regression.

For example, a cubicle producer considers changing their cubicle design. One designer promotes changing the footprint from 4-foot (1.22 m) square to 1.2-meter square. Immediately, the sales manager calls "NUC" and the problem is understood: if the footprint changes and existing customers are considering buying more from the producer, they will have to fit a different sized unit in an office designed for the 4-foot square cubicle.

Planned obsolescence is a type of upward compatibility, but rather than adopting a policy of backwards compatibility, companies adopt a commercial policy of backwards incompatibility so that newer apps require newer devices.

== See also ==
- Backward compatibility
- Bug compatibility, backward compatibility that maintains the known flaws
- Computer compatibility
- Downcycling
- Future proofing
- Robustness principle
- Repurposing
