= Gigaset =

German multinational technology company

Gigaset AG
- Formerly: Bad Salzschlirf AG (1900-2002); Arques AG (2002-2003); Arques Industries AG (2002-2011)
- Company type: Public
- Traded as: FWB: GGS
- ISIN: DE0005156004
- Industry: Telecommunications
- Founded: 26 January 1900; 126 years ago
- Founder: Hermann Vollrath
- Headquarters: Munich, Germany
- Area served: Worldwide
- Key people: Klaus Weßing (CEO and chairman of the executive board); Bernhard Riedel (chairman of the supervisory board)
- Products: Cordless, VoIP and corded telephones as well as Smart Home
- Revenue: €280 million (2018)
- Operating income: ▼ (€8.5 million) (2018)
- Net income: ▼€3.4 million (2018)
- Total assets: ▼€213.1 million (2018)
- Number of employees: 888 (2018)
- Subsidiaries: Gigaset Communications (2008-2024)
- Website: www.gigaset.ag

Gigaset AG (originally Bad Salzschlirf AG, later Arques AG and Arques Industries AG) is a multinational corporation based in Munich, Germany.

Founded in 1900 by Hermann Vollrath, it was responsible for the holding activities of the subsidiary Gigaset Communications until the sale of the subsidiary to VTech in 2024.

== History ==
On 26 January 1900, Hermann Vollrath founded Bad Salzschlirf, which acquired the entire spa business for 1.25 million marks in the Bad Salzschlirf resort, which had existed since 1838. In addition, Bad Salzschlirf acquired the rights to the springs and mines, the bottled water from the Bonifatius spring in Salzschlirf, which was distributed, among other products like soft drinks. The company issued shares with a nominal value of 100 and 1,000 marks. Regular spa operations ceased with the outbreak of war in 1939. The three spa hotels owned by Bad Salzschlirf were confiscated and subsequently used as a military hospital for wounded soldiers. In 1949, they initially served as accommodation for the occupation troops, before being returned to Bad Salzschlirf a year later.

Cost-cutting laws, combined with poor management, plunged Bad Salzschlirf into financial difficulties. As a result, in the early 1990s, the company was forced to lay off 300 employees, sell three spas, the mineral water plant, and the bathhouse, and close a spa hotel. However, this was not enough to reduce losses, and Bad Salzschlirf, which, according to then-chairman of the supervisory board, Fritz Kramer, had become a loss-making real estate company in recent years, was forced to file for bankruptcy on 7 February 2001. At the time, the main shareholders were the Fulda district (approximately 45%), the Landesbank Baden-Württemberg (approximately 25%), and the Retzmann family (approximately 11%). All employees received termination notice on 31 July 2001, and the liquidation of the company's remaining assets began. The municipality of Bad Salzschlirf acquired the spa operations with the help of several investor groups. For the remaining shell company, investor Peter Löw and the Buchanan Group, led by investor Steven Wilkinson, submitted a takeover bid of €32.60 per share. After the closing of the offer period on 31 July 2002, they controlled 83% of the capital.

In June 2002, Bad Salzschlirf convened a general meeting. At that meeting, the new corporate purpose and the company name Arques were presented, which, according to Löw, derived from the Spanish word "arcos" (arches). The new corporate purpose included investing in medium-sized companies in need of restructuring, with the aim of selling them after the restructuring and corporate reorganization.

The following year, the name was changed to Arques Industries.

On 27 July 2005, Arques Industries acquired 95% of the shares of Arquana International Print & Media. By the end of August 2007, Arques had reduced its stake in Arquana to less than 20%, and on 7 January 2008, Arquana filed for insolvency with the Neumünster District Court.

In 2008, Arques acquired Siemens Home and Office Communication Devices from Siemens for €45 million, which it renamed Gigaset Communications. A dispute with Siemens regarding outstanding payments and guarantees was settled out of court.

In 2011, Arques Industries was renamed Gigaset. The company sold all its holdings except for its two subsidiaries, Gigaset Communications (telephones) and SM Electronic (satellite receivers).

In January 2014, SM Electronic, the last subsidiary outside the telecommunications sector, was divested.

On 19 September 2023, Gigaset's board of directors decided to file for ordinary insolvency proceedings for Gigaset and for self-managed insolvency proceedings for Gigaset Communications at the Münster District Court. The reason given was "an unexpected and significant decline in sales in the second half of 2023" and a resulting lack of liquidity, which the company stated it could not secure through other lenders or investors. An article in the Süddeutsche Zeitung further suggested that the manufacturer was relying on an outdated business model.

On 2 April 2024, the company was sold to VTech subsidiary Snom. The acquisition was officially announced as completed on 5 April.

== Logos ==
2002-2008

2008-2011

2011–present
