= List of Care Bears video games =

Care Bears is a media franchise owned by American Greetings which began as a series of greeting cards in 1981. Since then, a number of media featuring the eponymous characters have been produced, including video games. While a Care Bears game was intended for release as far back as 1983 for the Atari 2600, the first officially licensed software entry in the franchise, Care Bears: Care-a-lot Jamboree, debuted in 2003 for Microsoft Windows and Mac OS. Several games, mainly educational titles aimed at younger players, have subsequently been developed, appearing on platforms such as PC, V.Smile, and Game Boy Advance. Numerous mobile phone apps were also released for Android and iOS.

== Games ==
=== PC/console games ===
| Game | Details |
|---|---|
| Care Bears: Care-a-lot Jamboree Original release date: NA: August 2003 | Release years by system: 2003 — Microsoft Windows, Mac OS |
| Care Bears: Care-a-lot Jamboree Original release date: NA: August 2003 | Care Bears: Care-a-lot Jamboree is an educational game developed by ImagEngine and published by ValuSoft. It is the first officially released Care Bears video game, which was made available in North America in August 2003 for Windows and Macintosh PCs. |

| Game | Details |
|---|---|
| Care Bears: Let's Have a Ball! Original release date: NA: September 28, 2004 | Release years by system: 2004 — Microsoft Windows, Mac OS |
| Care Bears: Let's Have a Ball! Original release date: NA: September 28, 2004 | Care Bears: Let's Have a Ball! is an educational game for Microsoft Windows and Mac OS, and the second Care Bears game to be developed by ImagEngine and published by ValuSoft. It was released in North America on September 28, 2004, and features eight minigames including matching, bowling, and soccer. |

| Game | Details |
|---|---|
| Care Bears: A Lesson in Caring Original release date: NA: September 30, 2004 | Release years by system: 2004 — V.Smile |
| Care Bears: A Lesson in Caring Original release date: NA: September 30, 2004 | Care Bears: A Lesson in Caring is an educational video game for the V.Smile edutainment system and was released in North America by VTech on September 30, 2004. The game features two gameplay modes – Learning Adventure and Learning Zone – that teach letters, numbers, and colors and is intended for children ages 3 to 5. |

| Game | Details |
|---|---|
| Care Bears: Care Quest Original release dates: NA: October 1, 2005; EU: February 3, 2006 | Release years by system: 2005 — Game Boy Advance |
| Care Bears: Care Quest Original release dates: NA: October 1, 2005; EU: February 3, 2006 | Care Bears: Care Quest is 2D platform game for the Game Boy Advance developed by Sirius Games and published by The Game Factory. It was released in North America in October 2005, and in Europe the following year in February 2006. Players take control of a specific Care Bear in 12 quests containing multiple levels. |

| Game | Details |
|---|---|
| Care Bears: Catch a Star! Original release dates: NA: October 5, 2005 | Release years by system: 2005 — Microsoft Windows, Mac OS |
| Care Bears: Catch a Star! Original release dates: NA: October 5, 2005 | Care Bears: Catch a Star! is the third educational Care Bears title developed by ImagEngine and published by ValuSoft for Windows and Mac OS. It was released in October 2005 in North America, and features eight minigames. |

| Game | Details |
|---|---|
| Care Bears: Play Day Original release date: NA: August 2008 | Release years by system: 2008 — V.Smile Baby |
| Care Bears: Play Day Original release date: NA: August 2008 | Care Bears: Play Day is an educational video game for the V.Smile Baby edutainment system and was released in North America by VTech sometime in August 2008. It is based on the 2007 animated series Care Bears: Adventures in Care-a-lot. The game features three play modes (Play Time, Watch & Learn, and Learn & Explore), and six activities, the first five (Play Day Celebration, Feelings Faces, Counting Hopscotch, Alphabet in the Park, and Rainbow Slide) showing on all three modes, and the sixth activity (Baby Sign Language - Time to Play) only showing in Watch & Learn mode. |

| Game | Details |
|---|---|
| Care Bears: To the Rescue Original release dates: WW: October 24, 2024 | Release years by system: 2024 — Microsoft Windows, Nintendo Switch, PlayStation 4, PlayStation 5, Xbox One, Xbox Series X|S |
| Care Bears: To the Rescue Original release dates: WW: October 24, 2024 | Care Bears: To the Rescue is a 2D action platformer developed by Polygoat and published by Forever Entertainment based on the animated series Care Bears: Unlock the Magic. The game supports up to four players and was released simultaneously on Microsoft Windows, Nintendo Switch, PlayStation 4, PlayStation 5, Xbox One, and Xbox Series X|S. |

=== Mobile apps ===
| Game | Details |
|---|---|
| Care Bears Create & Share! Original release date: WW: September 11, 2013 | Release years by system: 2013 — Android, iOS |
| Care Bears Create & Share! Original release date: WW: September 11, 2013 | Care Bears Create & Share! is an educational game for Android and iOS mobile phones developed and published by Budge Studios and was released in September 2013. Designed primarily for girls in preschool to kindergarten, the app allows players to create their own Care Bear-themed postcards and share them with others using a collection of images. The game was nominated for a 2013 Best Mobile App Award for the category of "Best App for Children and Kids". |

| Game | Details |
|---|---|
| Care Bears: Love to Learn Original release date: WW: July 1, 2014 | Release years by system: 2014 — Android, iOS |
| Care Bears: Love to Learn Original release date: WW: July 1, 2014 | Care Bears: Fun to Learn is an educational game for Android and iOS mobile phones published by American Greetings, and was released in July 2014. Players complete a number of minigames to collect stars and prizes while learning about shapes, numbers, letters, and arithmetic. Common Sense Media gave the game a 3 out of 5, commenting that the short minigames were "just right for preschool attention spans," but that "There's not much depth as each game repeats without increasing in challenge." It was nominated for a late Fall 2014 Best Mobile App Award for "Best App for Children and Toddlers". |

| Game | Details |
|---|---|
| Care Bears Rainbow Playtime Original release date: WW: July 10, 2014 | Release years by system: 2014 — Android, iOS |
| Care Bears Rainbow Playtime Original release date: WW: July 10, 2014 | Care Bears Rainbow Playtime is an educational game for Android and iOS mobile phones developed and published by TabTale, and was released worldwide in July 2014. It contains nine minigames featuring a different Care Bear. |

| Game | Details |
|---|---|
| Care Bears: Wish Upon a Cloud Original release date: WW: September 15, 2015 | Release years by system: 2015 — Android, iOS |
| Care Bears: Wish Upon a Cloud Original release date: WW: September 15, 2015 | Care Bears: Wish Upon a Cloud is an educational game for Android and iOS mobile phones developed and published by Budge Games, and was released worldwide in September 2015. Players are tasked with bringing joy to the Care bears by dressing them in different outfits or adding props. |

| Game | Details |
|---|---|
| Rainbow Slides: Care Bears! Original release date: WW: August 14, 2016 | Release years by system: 2016 — Android, iOS |
| Rainbow Slides: Care Bears! Original release date: WW: August 14, 2016 | Rainbow Slides: Care Bears! is a digital board game for Android and iOS mobile phones developed and published by Tipitap, Inc. It was released worldwide in August 2016 and is a Care Bear-themed version of the game Snakes and Ladders. |

| Game | Details |
|---|---|
| Care Bears: Care Karts Original release date: WW: December 2016 | Release years by system: 2016 — Android, iOS |
| Care Bears: Care Karts Original release date: WW: December 2016 | Care Bears: Care Karts is an educational simulation game for Android and iOS mobile phones developed and published by PlayDate Digital, and was released worldwide in December 2016. The game involves the player designing a kart racer for different Care Bears, as well as feed, dress, and wash them for an upcoming race against Beastly. |

| Game | Details |
|---|---|
| Care Bears Fun to Learn Original release date: WW: May 10, 2017 | Release years by system: 2017 — Android, iOS |
| Care Bears Fun to Learn Original release date: WW: May 10, 2017 | Care Bears Fun to Learn is an educational game for Android and iOS mobile phones developed and published by Tap Tap Tales which was released worldwide in May 2017. Players assist the Care Bears in a series of minigames that teach letters, numbers, colors, and shapes, as well as language and math. |

| Game | Details |
|---|---|
| Care Bears & Amigos in NYC Original release date: WW: July 29, 2017 | Release years by system: 2017 — Android, iOS |
| Care Bears & Amigos in NYC Original release date: WW: July 29, 2017 | Care Bears & Amigos in NYC is an educational game for Android and iOS mobile phones released in North America in July 2017. It was developed and published by Bilingual Children's Enterprises and is designed to teach Spanish to preschoolers through a combination of videos, storybooks, and minigames. The game features more than 1,000 words in Spanish and English, which can be toggled from one to the other. Common Sense Media gave the title a 3 out of 5, remarking that "while the games are fun to play, they're also very simple." |

| Game | Details |
|---|---|
| Care Bears Music Band Original release date: WW: July 29, 2017 | Release years by system: 2017 — Android, iOS |
| Care Bears Music Band Original release date: WW: July 29, 2017 | Care Bears Music Band is a music game for Android and iOS mobile phones developed and published by TabTale and released worldwide in July 2017. |

| Game | Details |
|---|---|
| Care Bears: Pull the Pin Original release date: WW: December 8, 2020 | Release years by system: 2020 — Android, iOS |
| Care Bears: Pull the Pin Original release date: WW: December 8, 2020 | Care Bears: Pull the Pin is a puzzle game for Android and iOS developed and published by GameJam and released in December 2020. |

=== Cancelled games ===
| Game | Details |
|---|---|
| Care Bears Original release dates: Cancelled | Release years by system: Cancelled — Atari 2600 |
| Care Bears Original release dates: Cancelled | Care Bears was a cancelled action video game intended for release by Parker Brothers for the Atari 2600. It was scheduled to launch in North America in 1983, and would have been the first Care Bears video game, predating Care-a-lot Jamboree by 20 years. The game involved the player grabbing "tummy icons" from Care Bears as they descended from the top of the screen before arranging them in a certain order before time ran out. Programmer Laura Niklich stated that although development made it to the beta stage, Parker Brother's marketing team decided to halt development as they felt the market for children's video games was diminishing and the existing gameplay looked "too dull". |
