= V.Flash =

Educational console

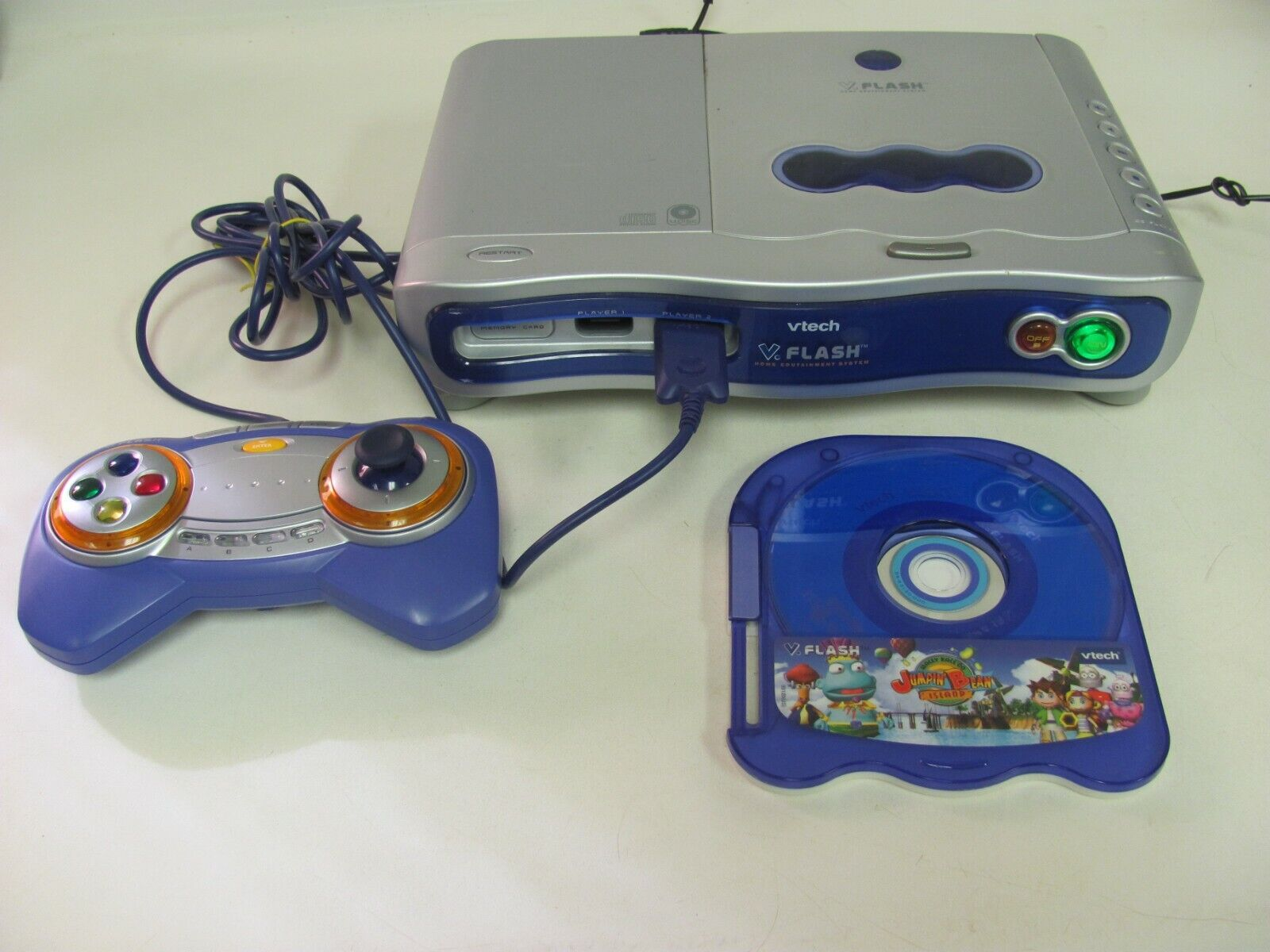
- Developer: VTech; Koto Laboratory
- Manufacturer: VTech
- Type: Educational home video game console
- Generation: Seventh
- Released: September 2006
- Introductory price: $100
- Discontinued: 2007
- Media: Customized encased CD-ROM "V.Discs"
- CPU: ARM9 from LSI Logic
- Storage: Memory card
- Graphics: 3D Capable
- Controller input: Joystick
- Marketing target: Children aged 5-10
- Predecessor: V.Smile
- Successor: InnoTV

The V.Flash Home Edutainment System, also known as V.Smile Pro in Europe, is a seventh-generation educational home video game console and spinoff from the V.Smile series of video game consoles developed by VTech and Koto Laboratory. Unlike the V.Smile, this game console uses 3D graphics. This system is designed for children aged 6 to 10.

Although critics praised the V.Flash for improving on the V.Smile's base, the console's sales lagged behind the former. VTech discontinued the V.Flash shortly after and shifted focus back to the V.Smile.

== History ==
It was revealed at the 2006 London Toy Fair, and released in September 2006. The system retailed for $100.

== Games ==
Since the console did not sell as well as the V.Smile, not many games were made for it. All games were released in the United States, the United Kingdom, Spain, France and Germany, with the exceptions of Bratz Fashion Pixiez: The Secret Necklace, which was not released in the United Kingdom and Germany, Multisports/Defis Sports, which was exclusive to Germany and France, and Scooby-Doo!: Ancient Adventure, which was not released in Germany. Additionally, Bratz Fashion Pixiez: The Secret Necklace, Cars: In the Fast Lane and Disney Princess: The Crystal Ball Adventure were released in Mexico.

There are 10 titles known to have been released. The Princeton Review was involved in the development of educational content for some games.

US/UK title	Overseas title(s)	Age range
Bratz Fashion Pixiez: The Secret Necklace	(Spain) Bratz Fashion Pixiez: El Misterio del Collar (France) Bratz Fashion Pixiez: Le Collier Magique (Mexico) Bratz Fashion Pixiez: El Secreto del Magico (Netherlands) Bratz Fashion Pixiez: De Magische Ketting	(United States) 6–8 (Spain) 6–9 (France) 6–9 (Mexico) 6–9
Cars: In the Fast Lane	(Spain) Cars: El Carril Rápido (France) Cars: À Fond La Caisse! (Germany) Cars: Auf Der Überholspur (Mexico) Cars: El Corredores Rapido (Netherlands) Cars: in de Snelle Baan	(United States) 6–8 (United Kingdom) 5–7 (Spain) 6–9 (France) 6–9 (Germany) 6–8 (Mexico) 6–9
Disney Princess: The Crystal Ball Adventure	(Spain) Disney Princess: El Castillo de las Princesas (France) Disney Princess: L'aventure enchantée (Germany) Disney Prinzessinnen: Das zauberhafte Märchen-Abenteuer (Mexico) Disney Princesas: La aventura encantado	(United States) 6–8 (United Kingdom) 5–7 (Spain) 6–9 (France) 6–9 (Germany) 6–10 (Mexico) 6–10
N/A (Note: Although the name is in English, Multisports was exclusive to Germany and France and no English version exists.)	(Germany) Multisports (France) Défis Sports	(Germany) 6–8 (France) 6–9
Scooby-Doo: Ancient Adventure	(Spain) Scooby-Doo: Viaje Al Pasado (France) Scooby-Doo!: Les Civilisations Perdues (Mexico) Scooby-Doo!: Las Viajan de Pasado	(United States) 6–8 (Spain) 6–9 (France) 6–9
Shrek the Third: The Search for Arthur	(Spain) Shrek Tercero: ¿Donde Está Arturo? (France) Shrek Le Troisieme: En quête d'Arthur (Germany) Shrek Der Dritte: Die Suche nach Arthus	(United States) 6–8 (United Kingdom) 7–9 (Spain) 6–9 (France) 6–9 (Germany) 6–8
SpongeBob SquarePants: Idea Sponge	(Spain) Bob Esponja: Misión Esponja (France) Bob L'Éponge: Une Idée Spongieuse (Germany) SpongeBob Schwammkopf: Ein Schwamm voller Ideen	(United States) 8–10 (United Kingdom) 7–9 (Spain) 6–9 (France) 8–11 (Germany) 8–10
The Amazing Spider-Man: Countdown to Doom	(Spain) El Asombroso Spider-Man: Persecicíon en la Ciudad (France) Spider-Man: Course-poursuite à Manhattan (Germany) Spider-Man: Angriff der Super-Schurken	(United States) 8–10 (United Kingdom) 7–9 (Spain) 8–11 (France) 8–11 (Germany) 8–10
The Incredibles: Mission Incredible	(Spain) Los Increíbles: Misión Increíble (France) Les Indestructibes: Les Indestructibes À La Rescousse (Germany) Die Unglaublichen: In unglaublicher Mission	(United States) 8–10 (United Kingdom) 7–9 (Spain) 8–11 (France) 8–11 (Germany) 8–10
Wacky Race on Jumpin' Bean Island	(Spain) Carrera Loca En La Isla De Las Vainas Fritas (France) Dingo'Rallye: Fou! Fou! Fou! (Germany) Das Verrückte Rennen Der Hüpf-Bohnen Insel	(United States) 5–7 (United Kingdom) 5–7 (Spain) 6–9 (France) 6–10 (Germany) 6–8
National Geographic Kids	Unreleased, showcased in a 2007 V.Tech catalog	?-?

== CDs ==
Unlike most other CD-ROM-based consoles, this system uses 12 cm CDs enclosed with plastic to protect damage from touching (although it could also protect from piracy), which is somewhat similar to 3.5" floppy disks or UMDs. The discs use the ISO 9660 file system, without any copy protection mechanism other than a simple sensor in the case jacket, making it possible to make a disc image out of the media. Because of this, the V.Flash can also play audio CDs and user-recorded CD-Rs using the supplied disc adapter.

== Other hardware ==
The processor is an ARM9 processor from LSI Logic. Files are stored in 3 main formats: .mjp (Motion JPEG), .ptx, and .snd. The latter have been determined to be PCM WAV files.

Capable of rendering 1.5 million polygons per second and equipped with a 32 bit CPU, this system is directly comparable to the fifth generation game consoles, such as the PlayStation.

The system may use a memory card to save games.

== See also ==
- VTech
- V.Smile
- VTech Socrates
