= VTech PreComputer 1000 =

The VTech PreComputer 1000 is an electronic learning aid designed for children aged 9 and above. Manufactured by VTech, it was released on August 21, 1988, in the United States and in 1989 in Europe. The device features a dot matrix LCD screen and a standard-sized keyboard. It offers a variety of educational activities, including trivia games focused on science, history, and general knowledge.

The VTech PreComputer 1000 is VTech's first child learning product to incorporate the BASIC programming language. Released on August 21, 1988, in the United States and in 1989 in Europe, it features a dot matrix LCD screen and a standard-sized keyboard. Designed for children aged 9 and above, it includes a variety of educational activities, such as trivia games on science, history, and general knowledge. The PreComputer 1000 is the predecessor to the PreComputer 2000.

== Specifications ==
The VTech PreComputer 1000 relies upon a Zilog Z84C0004PEC (a Z80B clone) as its processing core. A 16Kbit (2Kx8bit) 2K Sharp LH5116-10 or Hyundai HY6116ALP-10 SRAM is used for RAM. As of 1992, a CMOS version of the Z80 marketed as the Z84 is used.

A Toshiba TC531000CP 1MBit (128Kx8bit) 128K ROM contains the Operating System and program data. This ROM can be augmented when a cartridge is inserted into the side mounted cartridge slot and then selected, thus providing expansion capability.

Text output is supplied by a single row 20 character dot-matrix LCD panel, sound output is via an inbuilt piezo element beeper.

== Functions ==
The following functions can be performed on this unit:

- Typing course
- Fact quizzes (250 facts in each of the following categories: General Knowledge, History, Science & Geography)
- Mathematics activities (5 activities for 1 or 2 players)
- Games (1 single player typing game, Hangman and Scramble)
- Calculator
- BASIC (stylized as PRE-BASIC 1.0) programming with 9 example programs

== BASIC implementation ==
PRE-BASIC 1.0 is a simplified unstructured BASIC implementation includes a simple line editor with the ability to change, insert or delete characters on a program line.

Supported features include:

- Single character variable names for numbers and strings
- String and numeric arrays up to three dimensions
- Data manipulation with LET.. DATA.. READ.. RESTORE
- Input and output with LIST.. PRINT.. INPUT
- Mathematical functions (e.g. ABS, SGN, TAN)
- Logical operations (e.g. NOT, OR, AND)
- String handling (e.g. LEFT$, CHR$)
- Flow control with IF.. THEN.. ELSE, FOR.. TO.. NEXT.. STEP and GOSUB.. RETURN
- Single channel sound with 31 notes and 9 durations

== Expansion Cartridges ==
The following cartridges were available for the PreComputer 1000 and also supported in the PreComputer 2000. The cartridges could only be inserted with the power off before re-powering and pressing the 'Cartridge' button to activate.

- Bible Knowledge (Stock Code: 80-0989)
- Fantasy Trivia (Stock Code: 80-1001)
- General Knowledge II (Stock Code: 80-1002)
- Super Science (Stock Code: 80-1410)
- Speller (Stock Code: 80-1004)
- Famous places and things (Stock Code: 80-1533) - Marketed for both PreComputer 1000 and 2000

The same Toshiba TC531000CP 128K ROM is used in some cartridges.
