= VTech PreComputer 2000 =

The VTech PreComputer 2000 (also known as the Genius Leader 2000/2000 Plus) is an electronic learning aid manufactured by VTech and released in 1992. It contains a dot matrix LCD, standard size keyboard, 34 activities for teaching in 4 different levels for 1 or 2 players and introductory computer programming with the BASIC programming language. It has an 80,000 word spell checker and a SAT word builder. It can be powered by a battery or AC adapter. It is the successor to the VTech PreComputer 1000 model.

== Specifications ==
The VTech PreComputer 2000 relies upon a Z80B clone as its processing core.

A 1MBit (128Kbyte) ROM contains the Operating system and program data which can be expanded via the cartridge slot.

Output is supplied by a 2 row 20 column dot-matrix LCD panel.

This machine features a rudimentary implementation of BASIC offering truth tables, arrays, input statements and variables, allowing users to create simple text programs. One program may be held in memory at a time.

== Features ==
The VTech PreComputer 2000 offers the following features:

- 12 educational word activities
- 4 mathematics activities
- 4 word-based games
- 1,000 trivia questions in 4 categories
- 1,000 word vocabulary available for activities
- 80,000 word spell checker
- BASIC (stylized as PC2000 BASIC)
- Calculator
- Cartridge slot backward compatibility with the VTech PreComputer 1000

== Expansion cartridges ==
Cartridges for the VTech PreComputer 1000 could be used but the following cartridges were available for the VTech PreComputer 2000: The cartridges could only be inserted with the power off before re-powering and pressing the 'Cartridge' button to activate.

- Super Memory Expander (Stock Code: 80-1531) - 32Kbyte memory upgrade for BASIC programs
- Famous places and things (Stock Code: 801533) - Marketed for both PreComputer 1000 and 2000
