= DAPD News Agency =

German news agency

dapd Nachrichtenagentur GmbH
- Type: For profit cooperative
- Industry: News media
- Founded: September 2010
- Defunct: 2013
- Headquarters: Berlin, Germany
- Area served: Worldwide
- Key people: Martin Vorderwülbecke, president; Peter Löw, CEO; Cord Dreyer, editor-in-chief
- Products: Wire service
- Revenue: 27 million euro (2010)
- Number of employees: 200 editors, 77 news photographers

DAPD News Agency (in German dapd Nachrichtenagentur) was a German news agency.

== Overview ==
It was founded in September 2010 with its headquarters in Berlin. It was the second largest German news agency. It originated from the former West-German news agency Deutscher Depeschendienst (ddp), which had been "built out of remnants of the old UPI news service and the former East-German state-sponsored news service" ADN after reunification. In 2009, under private equity ownership, DDP acquired the German branch of the American news agency Associated Press (AP), and the combined agency was renamed DAPD in 2010.

The owners and managing directors were Martin Vorderwülbecke and Peter Löw. The chief editor was Cord Dreyer. The fully international news agency covered both regional and international issues.

The news service had a base of 700 customers, and provided up to 500 messages and 2,000 photographs daily. Among the customers were German newspapers and magazines, online media, television and radio transmitters, parties and governments, businesses, institutions and associations. In August 2011, the agency also created a sports service.

In July 2011, DAPD bought French photo agency Sipa Press.

In January 2012 it was announced that DAPD would open a news service in France.

In October 2012, the DAPD filed for insolvency protection, with all six of its subsidiaries declaring bankruptcy.

On 1 March 2013, dapd Nachrichtenagentur Beteiligungs GmbH filed for insolvency at the district court in Berlin-Charlottenburg. The rights to the text archive were eventually sold by the insolvency administrator and are now owned by the dts news agency.
