= Gigaset Communications =

German multinational technology company

Gigaset Communications GmbH

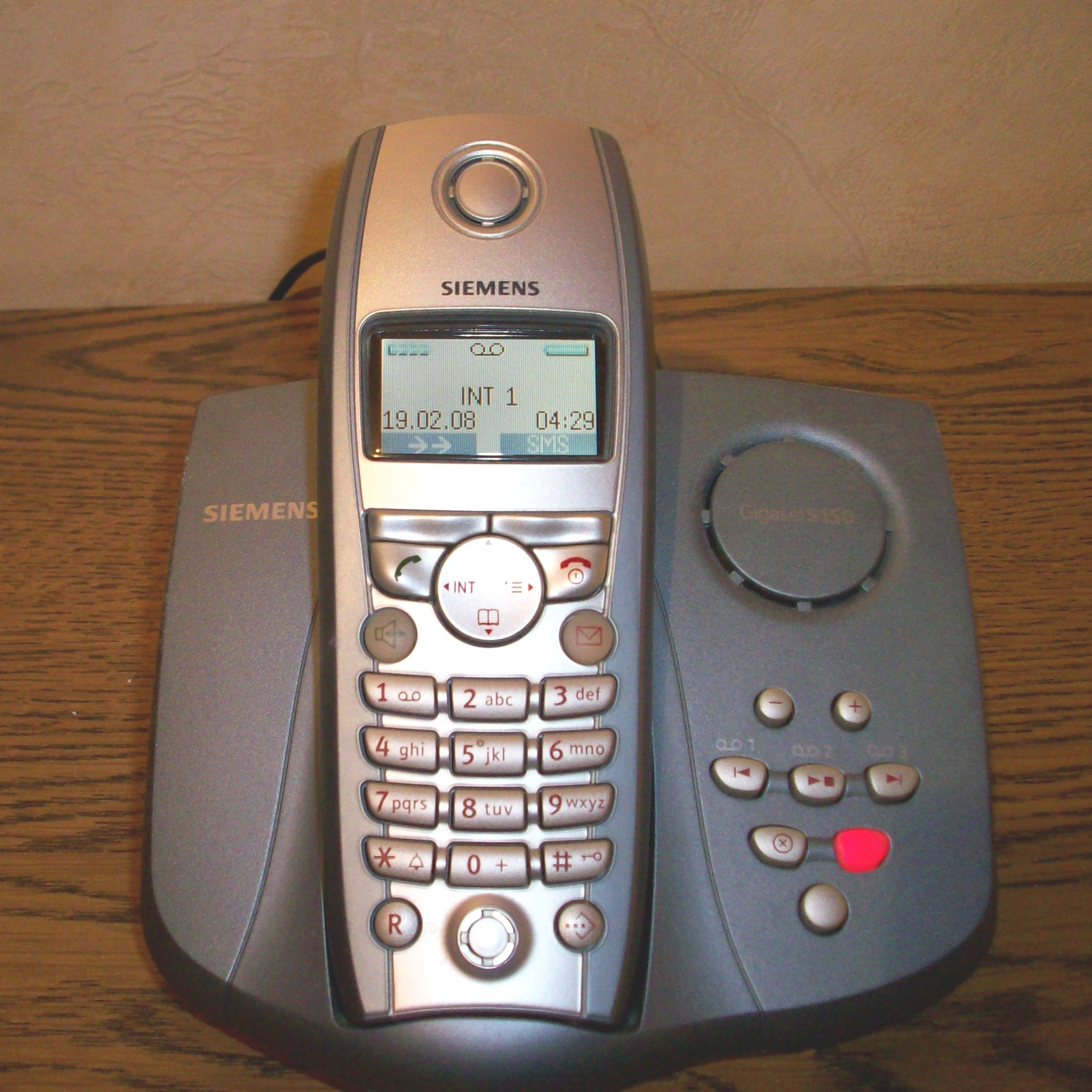
- Siemens Gigaset S150
- Formerly: Siemens Home and Office Communication Devices GmbH & Co. KG (2005-2008)
- Type: Subsidiary
- Industry: Telecommunications
- Founded: October 1, 2005; 20 years ago
- Founder: Siemens
- Headquarters: Munich, Germany
- Area served: Worldwide
- Key people: Klaus Weßing (CEO and chairman of the executive board); Bernhard Riedel (chairman of the supervisory board)
- Products: Cordless, VoIP and corded telephones as well as Smart Home
- Revenue: €280 million (2018)
- Operating income: ▼ (€8.5 million) (2018)
- Net income: ▼€3.4 million (2018)
- Total assets: ▼€213.1 million (2018)
- Owner: Siemens (2005-2008); Gigaset (2008-2024); Snom (2024-present)
- Number of employees: 888 (2018)
- Parent: Siemens (2005-2008); Gigaset (2008-2024); VTech (2024-present)
- Website: www.gigaset.com

Gigaset Communications GmbH (formerly known as Siemens Home and Office Communication Devices GmbH & Co. KG) is a multinational corporation based in Munich, Germany.

Founded in 2005 by Siemens, it was acquired by Arques Industries, later renamed Gigaset, in 2008, it is more active in the area of communications technology and in the manufacturing of DECT telephones.

In 2024 VTech acquired the company.

== History ==
Siemens Home and Office Communication Devices was established on 1 October 2005 by Siemens.

On 1 October 2008 Arques Industries, a private equity firm, acquired the company for 45 million euros.

In January 2024 it was announced that Gigaset and its assets would be acquired by VTech; that transaction was completed three months later.

On 5 April 2024, the VTech subsidiary Snom completed its acquisition of the company.

== Products and services ==
Gigaset creates numerous products for home and small office use:

- Cordless phones: Specializing in DECT and CAT-iq technology, Gigaset is the European market leader and offers a wide variety of wireless phones (900 MHz, 2.4 GHz and DECT).
- Smartphones: Gigaset GS160, Gigaset GS270, GS290, GX290, GS3, GS4, GS5, GX4, GX6, GX4 Pro, GX6 Pro.
- Feature Phone Gigaset GL7 Flip phone with apps and internet access, WhatsApp, Facebook, YouTube, Google Assistance with speech, Google Maps, GPS, Radio FM: Headphone jack 3.5 mm, SOS function for triggering an emergency call (Call to up to 5 predefined telephone numbers), WhatsApp key, Dual nanoSIM + separate memory card slot Micro-SDHC memory card up to 128 GB, 2 MP Camera, WiFi 2,4 GHz, Bluetooth 4.2, USB-C, GSM / 2G: 850 / 900 / 1800 / 1900 MHz, UMTS / 3G : 900 / 2100 MHz, LTE / FDD / 4G: 800 / 1800 / 2100 / 2600 MHz, KaiOS 2.5.3.2
- VoIP phones: A variety of cordless (DECT) VoIP products are available. Certain products offer free calls using gigaset.net SIP network.
- Corded phones: The company sells their analog phones by the brand "euroset".
- Business telephony: VoIP based corded and cordless DECT/Cat-iq phones, repeaters and IP PBX solutions for small and medium-sized enterprises, sold under the "Gigaset pro" brand.
- Smart home / security: sold under "Gigaset elements" brand. The typical system consists of a base station, motion, smoke detector, door and window sensors as well as a siren and camera. The system also offers a plug and a button that can be used to control electrical devices in the house. The devices are connected to the base-station through DECT Ultra Low Energy (DECT-ULE) and the base (a home gateway) is connected to the internet by wired LAN. The user has the ability to get notifications on his smartphone by using a dedicated app (available for Android and iOS).

Recent Gigaset and Gigaset pro cordless phones support Cat-iq 2.0 with HD Voice, allowing high-quality calls with a frequency response up to 7 kHz on VoIP/SIP phones and home gateways, using the G.722 wideband audio codec (dubbed High Definition Sound Performance (HDSP) by Gigaset).

Eco Dect and Eco Dect Plus are power-saving technologies used by Gigaset. Energy savings of 60-80% are available using a combination of low-energy switched-mode power supply unit, reduction of transmission power by adjusting transmission power according to the handset's distance to the base station, and switching off radio wave transmission completely when the handset is docked and charging or in standby mode. A green home logo indicates that the product has these features.

== Logos ==
2005-2010

2010–present
