= VTech Socrates =

Educational console

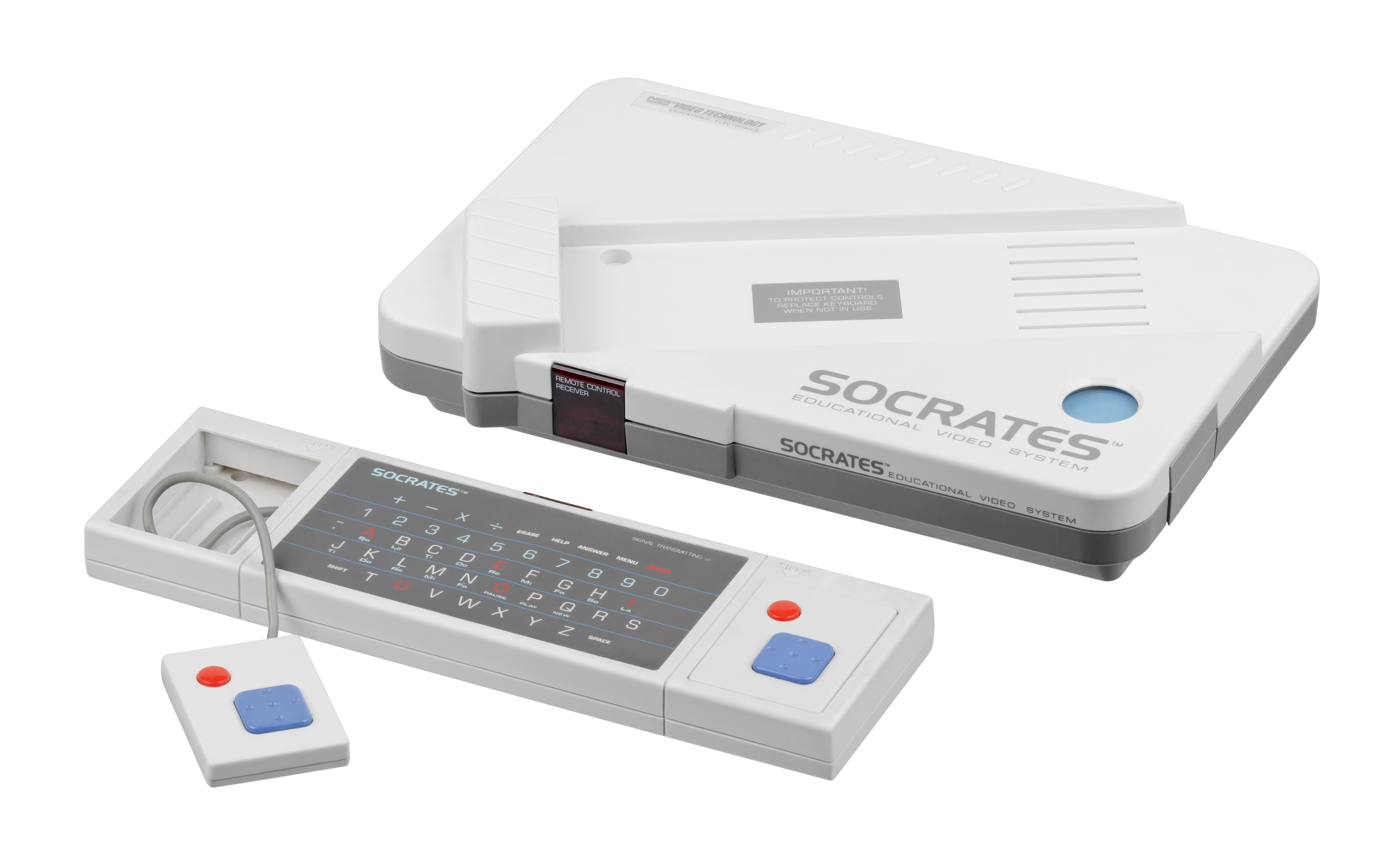
- Also known as: Prof. Weiss-Alles (Germany); Professeur Saitout (France); Socrates Saitout (Canada)
- Manufacturer: VTech
- Type: Educational home video game console
- Generation: Third generation
- Released: 1988
- Discontinued: 1996
- CPU: Z80A @ 3.57 MHz
- Graphics: Custom
- Predecessor: VTech Creativision
- Successor: V.Smile

The VTech Socrates is an 8-bit educational home video game console manufactured and released in 1988 by VTech. The console features the titular robot character Socrates, named after the Greek philosopher. The character is similar in appearance to Johnny 5 from the Short Circuit movies. It was discontinued in 1996.

The system uses wireless controllers that communicate via infrared reception.

Yeno distributed the system in Europe. In Germany, under the name Prof. Weiss-Alles, which translates to "Professor Knows-Everything". And in France, as the Professeur Saitout; Jeu Educatif Video, where "Saitout" comes from the French phrase "sait tout", meaning "knows all".

VTech also distributed the system in Canada, being sold as the Socrates Saitout; Jeu Educatif Video.

== Games ==
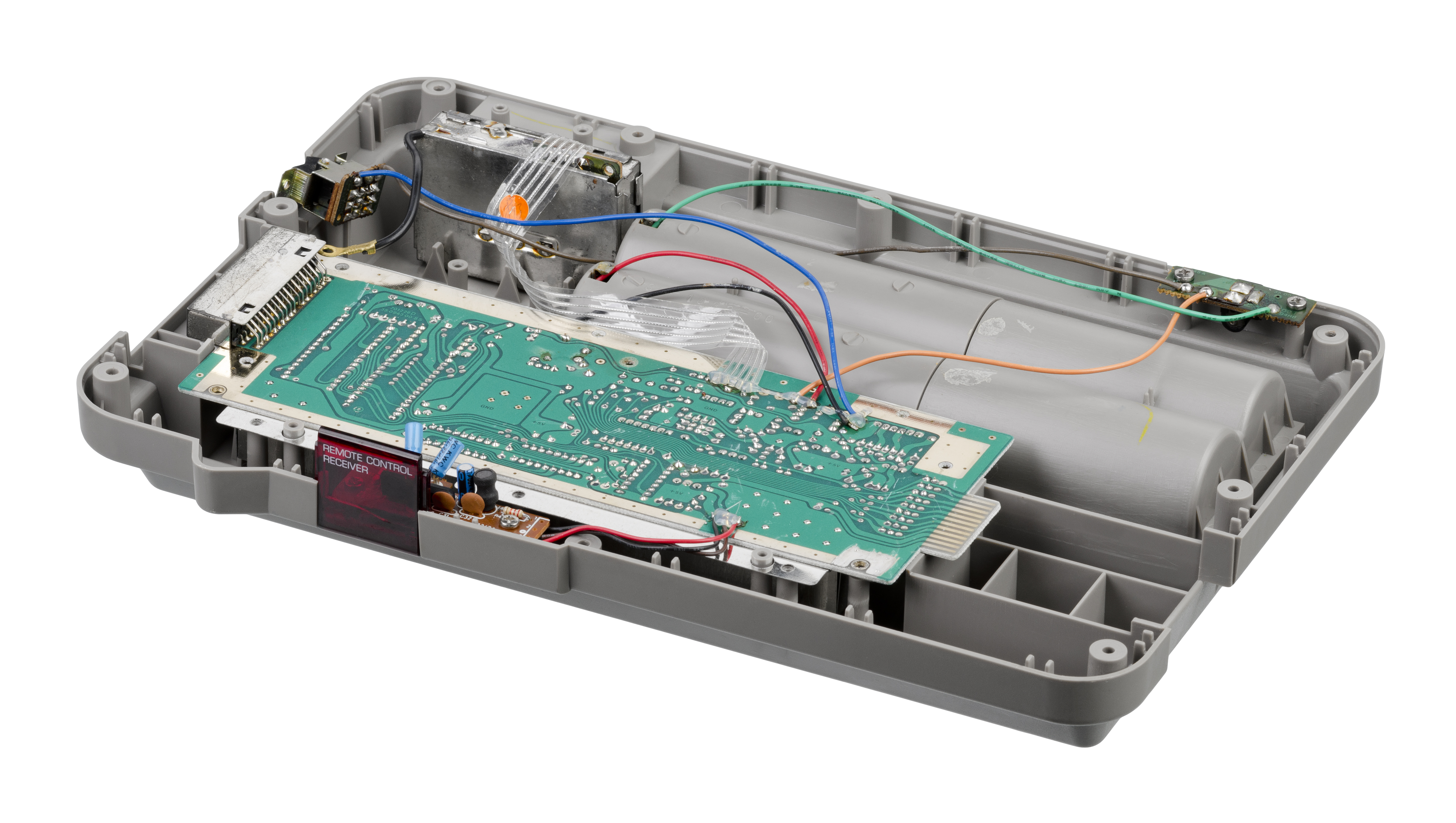
The inside of the Socrates. The system ran off six D batteries or used an optional AC adapter. (35–0943–00, 701228-D)

The main unit of the Socrates system is bundled with games in five categories: Math Problems, Word Problems, Word Games, Music Games, and Super Painter. Math Problems and Word Problems test basic skills regarding mathematics, spelling, definition, and sentence construction. Word Games resemble hangman, anagrams, and a racing game where players spell words in order to complete laps around a track. Music Games gives students the opportunity to compose simple melodies, listen to classic folk songs played by the machine, or play Simon Says with different notes. Super Painter allows students to create on-screen art through the use of different brushes, colors, backgrounds, and clip art. The Super Painter program would be spun off by VTech for their Video Painter line of toys.

Additional unbundled games for the system are packaged as cartridges which resemble 3.5" floppy disks. Brain Teasers are labeled in blue text and test students' memory and problem-solving skills. Awareness Games are labeled in red text, and teach students trivia, mathematics, and geography. Additional peripherals for the system use their own cartridges. The CAD Professor uses the Mouse tablet, and focuses on architectural, textile, and fashion design. The Touch Pad allows younger students to practice writing letters and numbers and drawing shapes; however, students can also use the Touch Pad with the Super Painter application.

The system also features voice capabilities through the use of an add-on voice cartridge compatible with all games.

Despite the processing speed of the Zilog Z80A CPU – 3.57 MHz, compared to the Nintendo Entertainment System's 1.79 MHz in NTSC regions – the Socrates often seems slow, with the system often taking several seconds to display a static image. The system will "draw" images by filling in areas of the screen with color one line at a time; it is not known whether this is an effect employed for the student's enjoyment or if it is due to the slow processing time of the system. There is also a latency between user input and system responses. Response times do not seem to be affected by the presence or absence of the voice cartridge.

=== List of Socrates games ===
There are 9 titles known to have been released.

Background shading indicates that the game required a separate peripheral.

#	English Title	Overseas Titles	Description	Age range	Series/Accessory
1	(United States) (Canada) Amazing Mazes	?	(United States) (Canada) Find Your Way Through Some Of The Zaniest Mazes	(United States) 5+	Brain Teasers
2	Around the World	?	(United States) An Adventure In World Geography	(United States) 7+	Awareness
3	CAD Professor	(Germany) Konstruieren Mit Computerhilfe		?	Mouse
4	(United States) (Canada) Facts 'N Fractions	(France) (Quebec) Fractions	(United States) (Canada) An Introduction To Fractions, Mixed Numbers & Decimals (France) (Quebec) Introduction Aux Fractions, Aux Nombres Mixtes Et Aux Nombres Decimaux	(United States) (Canada) 8+ (France) (Quebec) +8	Awareness
5	Game Wizard	(Germany) Magische Spiele	(United States) Games Of Strategy And Logic (Germany) Strategie-und Logikspiele	(United States) 8+ (Germany) 8+	Brain Teasers
6	Hodge-Podge	?	(United States) Word Games That Boggle The Mind!	(United States) 8+	Brain Teasers
7	Memory Mania	(Germany) Gedächtnis-Training	(United States) Memory Games That Challenge	(United States) 6+	Brain Teasers
8	Numbers, Shapes & Letters	?		?	Touch Pad
9	State to State	?	A Journey Across The United States	(United States) 8+	Awareness

== Hardware ==
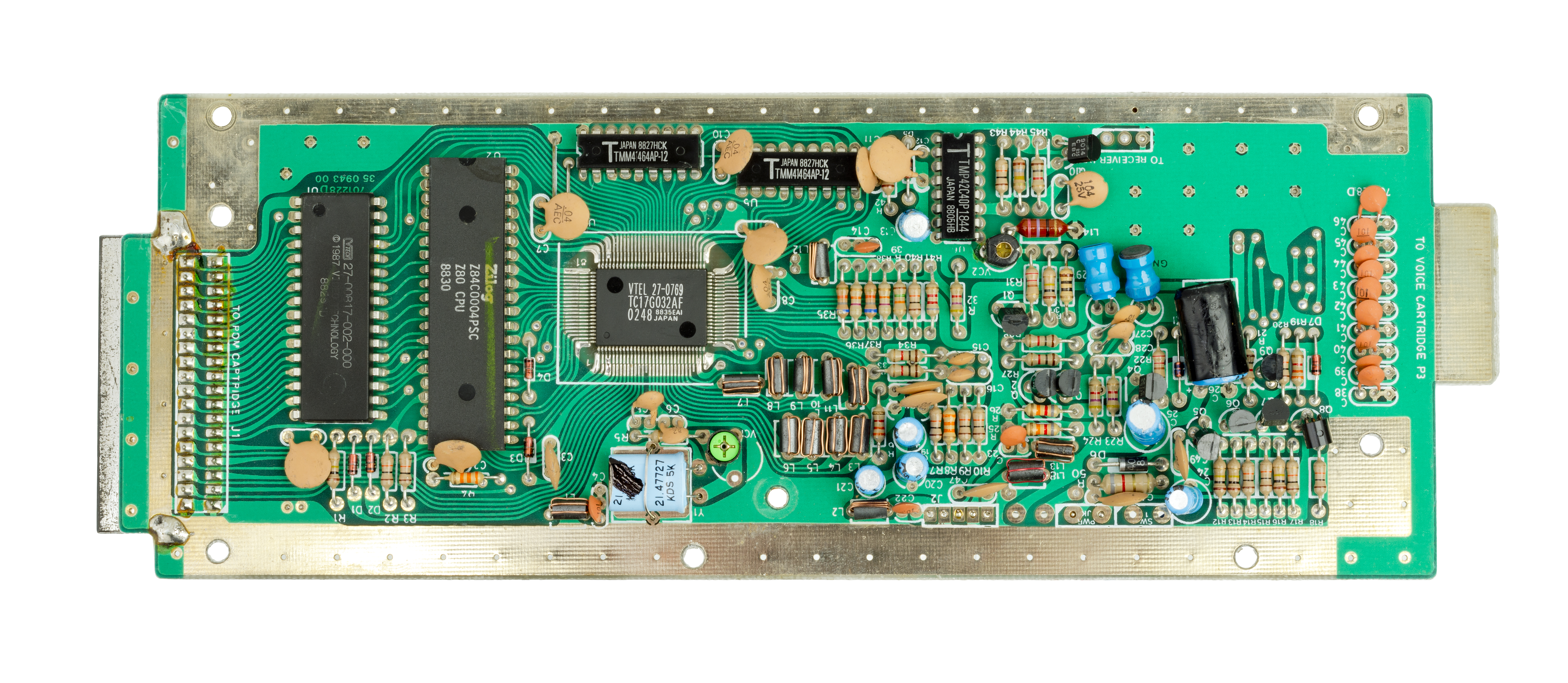
The Socrates uses a Zilog Z80A processor.

The standard system includes a wireless full keyboard with two wired-on controllers. The keyboard sends infrared signals to a receiver on the main console. Consoles vary in their effectiveness in receiving the signals; some can receive signals from up to twelve feet away, while others require the user to maintain a close and direct line with the receiver. The Mouse and Touch Pad peripherals – for the CAD Professor and Touch Pad cartridges respectively – also use infrared signals to communicate with the main system, but similar signal receiving issues may hamper the usefulness of these add-ons.
