= Peter Löw =

German lawyer and entrepreneur (born 1960)

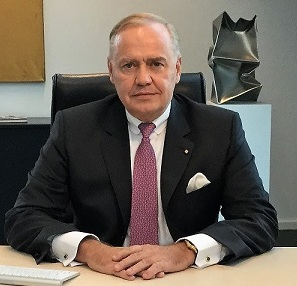
- Löw in 2016
- Born: Peter Werner Maria Löw; 21 October 1960 (age 65); Ludwigshafen

Peter Werner Maria Löw (born 21 October 1960) is a German lawyer and entrepreneur.

== Life ==
Peter Löw was born in 1960 in Ludwigshafen, Germany. In 1987, he started his doctoral studies in history at the University of Münster under the supervision of military historian Werner Hahlweg. After Hahlweg died, Löw found a new supervisor in Eckardt Opitz of Helmut Schmidt University, and in 1989 obtained a doctorate (Dr. phil.) for a dissertation on the Prussian army.

In 1991, he enrolled at Insead, where he received an MBA. In 1992, he submitted a dissertation on municipal law in Nazi Germany under the supervision of Franz-Ludwig Knemeyer at the University of Würzburg for which he received a legal doctorate (Dr. iur. utr.).

In 2012, Löw became a member of the senate of the college of philosophy and theology of the Philosophical-Theological University Heiligenkreuz. He became an honorary professor for philosophy of economics in 2013.

Peter Löw is a reserve officer in the Bundeswehr. In 2014, he survived an airplane crash in Florida. He lives in Munich and at Hofhegnenberg Castle.

Peter Löw was listed as one of the 500 richest Germans (ranked at no. 320) according to German Manager Magazin in 2020.

Löw is married and is a father of seven children.

== Career ==
Peter Löw worked as a consultant for McKinsey from 1991 and 1992.

Löw claims to have acquired majority stakes or significant shares in more than 300 businesses since 1992.

Between 2002 and 2007, Löw co-founded and lead Arques Industries together with Dirk Markus. In 2005, Arques acquired a number of printing businesses.

In 2007, Löw founded a gold trading company, 24k Trading Partners, but ended the business a year later.

In 2008, Löw incorporated an investment company, bluO, which he managed until 2013.

Löw made the headlines with the bankruptcy of German news agency dapd.

In 2013 Löw founded LIVIA Group as a family office. Löw held the chemical manufacturer Alzchem until it became public in 2017.

== Honours ==
- (Kingdom of the Two Sicilies) Two Sicilian Royal Family: Knight Grand Officer of Merit, Special Class of the Order of Saint George

== Publications ==
- Der preussische Unteroffizier im stehenden Heer des Absolutismus bis 1806. Am Beispiel der Infanteriekompanie. Hartung-Gorre, Constance 1989, ISBN 3-89191-317-6.
- Formularsammlung für die Berliner Rechtspraxis.. Löw and Vorderwülbecke, Baden-Baden 1990, ISBN 3-928017-75-6.
- Kommunalgesetzgebung im NS-Staat: am Beispiel der Deutschen Gemeindeordnung 1935. Löw and Vorderwülbecke, Baden-Baden 1992, ISBN 3-928017-64-0.
- Electio debet eating in libertate eligentium. Peter Loew. Baden-Baden: Löw & Vorderwülbecke 1992, ISBN 3-928017-61-6.
- Theologie und Wirtschaft. JP Bachem Verlag, Cologne 2017,ISBN 978-3-7616-3276-5.
- Väter in den Augen ihrer Söhne: Lebensbilder der Familienväter Löw über vier Generationen 1870 bis 2016. JP Bachem Verlag, Cologne 2018, ISBN 978-3-7616-3277-2.
- Flusenflug. Bekenntnisse eines Firmenjägers. Osburg Verlag, Hamburg 2020, ISBN 978-3-95510-233-3
- Fluffs. Confessions of a corporate raider. Osburg Verlag, Hamburg 2022, ISBN 978-3-95510-298-2
- Jungenhaft. Von einem, der auszog ... . Osburg Verlag, Hamburg 2020, ISBN 978-3-95510-299-9
- Boyish. The Tale of a Young Man Who Set Out to Learn the Meaning of Fear. Osburg Verlag, Hamburg 2022, ISBN 978-3-95510-299-9
