= V.Smile =

Educational console

VTech V.Smile

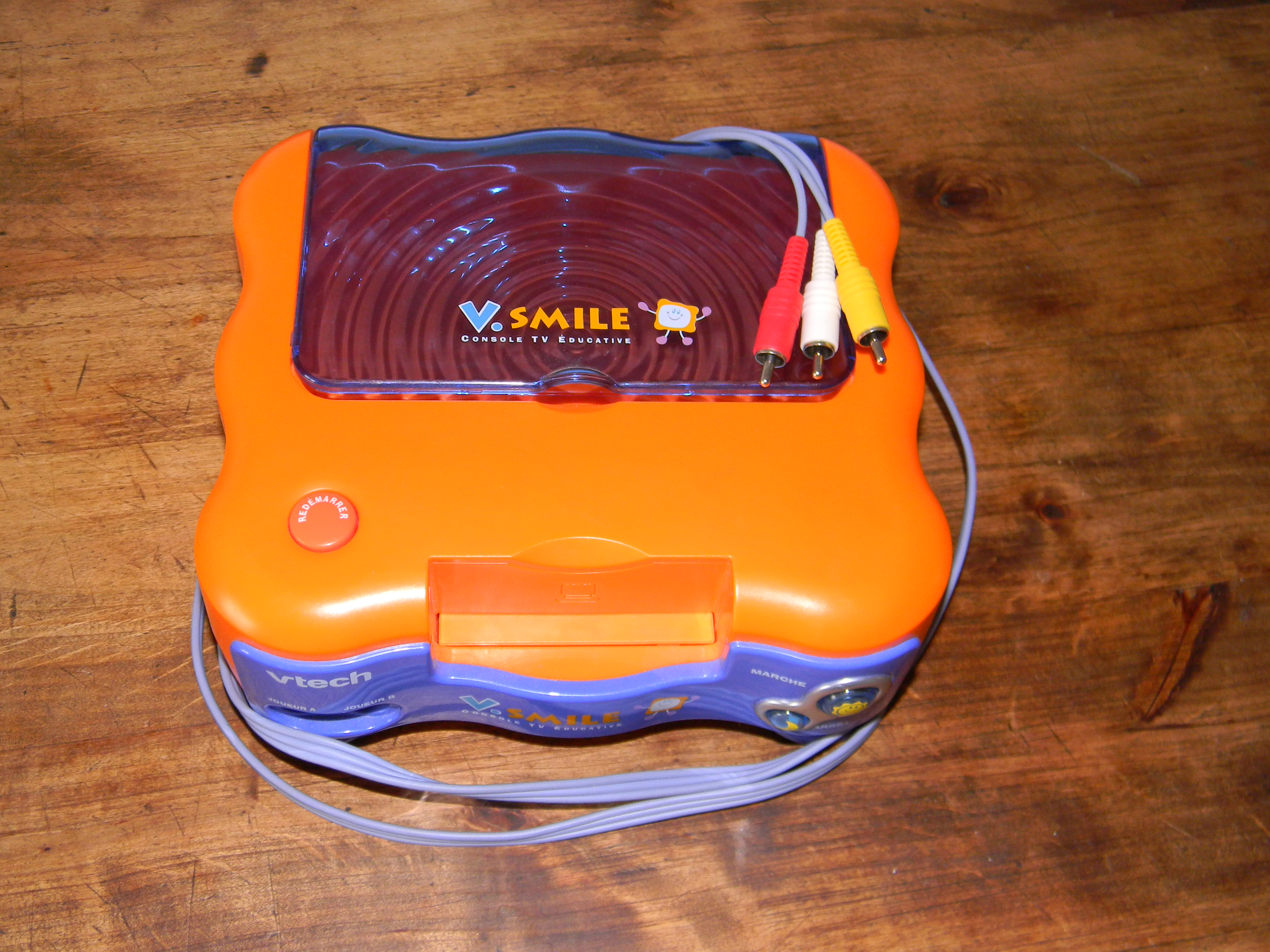
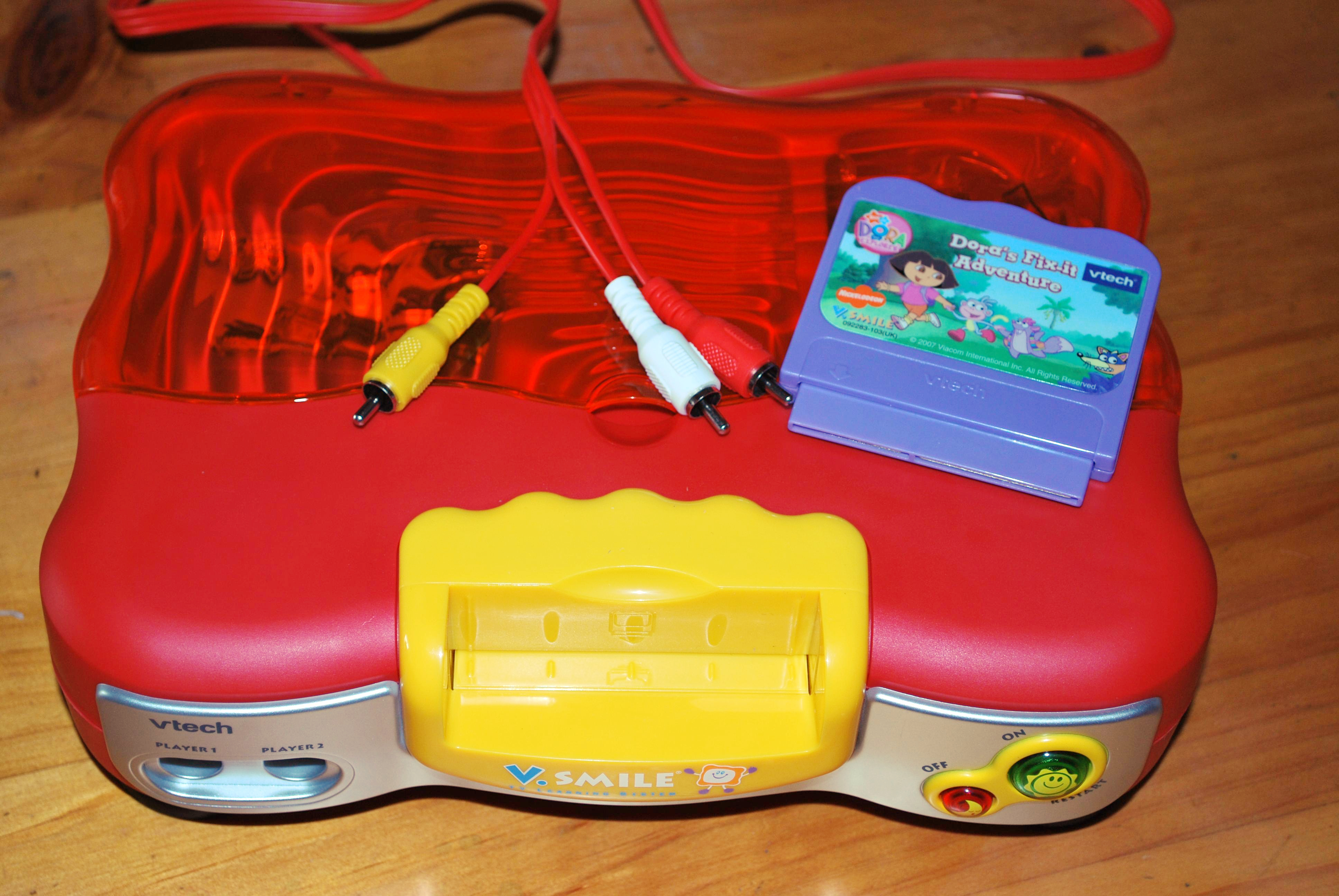
- Top: A French first-generation V.Smile (Model 6122); Bottom: A second-generation V.Smile (Model 752)
- Manufacturer: VTech
- Product family: V.Smile
- Type: Educational home video game console
- Generation: Sixth
- Released: WW: August 4, 2004
- Discontinued: 2010; 16 years ago
- Units sold: 11 million
- Media: Smartridge
- System on a chip: Sunplus SPG200 @ 27MHz
- Controller input: Up to 2 V.Smile controllers, optional keyboard/mouse, graphics tablet, and dance pad available
- Predecessor: VTech Socrates
- Successor: V.Flash

The V.Smile (stylized as V.SMILE TV Learning System) is a sixth-generation educational home video game console manufactured and released by VTech. The system was first released on August 4, 2004. Its titles are available on ROM cartridges called "Smartridges", a pun on the system's educational nature. Several variants of the V.Smile console are sold, including handheld versions and models with added functionality such as touch tablet integrated controllers or microphones. The V.Motion is a variant that includes motion-sensitive controllers and has titles designed to take advantage of motion-related "active learning". Without the cartridge, it will loop back to the startup screen.

== Hardware ==
A V.Smile generally has on and off buttons, two joystick ports, and a compartment for keeping the cartridges in addition to the cartridge slot. The system can run using either an AC adapter or with batteries. The V.Smile can hold up to six titles in its compartment.

The V.Smile is a standard cartridge-based system that will play the title inserted.

The V.Smile was released in several countries with different names:

Country	Distributor	Name	Tagline	Age range
(United States)	VTech	V.Smile TV Learning System	Turn Game Time Into Brain Time!	3-8 years
(United Kingdom)	VTech	V.Smile TV Learning System	Learning is child's play!	3-8 years
(Portugal)	Concentra	V.Smile Sistema Educativo De TV	Aprender é divertido!	3-7 years
(Spain)	VTech	V.Smile Aprendizaje Interactivo Por TV	¡Aprender es un juego de niños!	3-8 years
(Mexico)	VTech	V.Smile Aprender Interactivo Por TV	¡Aprender es un juego de niños!	3-8 years
(France)	VTech	V.Smile Console TV Éducative	La première console de jeu éducative pour les petits!	3-7 years
(Netherlands)	?	V.Smile TV Learning System	Leren is kinderspel!	3-7 years
(Germany)	VTech	V.Smile Das Lernspiel-System	Lernen wird zum Kinderspiel!	3-8 years
(Italy)	Giochi Preziosi	V.Smile Sistema di apprendimento TV	Imparare è un gioco da bambini!	3-7 years
(Denmark)	TOP-TOY A/S	V.Smile	Det ær lekande lætt att lære!	?
(Sweden)	?	V.Smile TV Learning System	Det är lekande lätt att lära!	3-7 years
(Norway)	?	V.Smile	?	?
(Finland)	?	V.Smile	?	?

== Variants ==
A second generation of the V.Smile console was launched in 2007. This model (Model 752) was bundled with a microphone, and a redesigned controller was shipped.

In 2008, a translucent-faced V.Smile TV Learning System Limited Edition console was released including two joysticks, and the Alphabet Park Adventure game cartridge. The console colors were reversed (translucent orange face with purple body) from the normal console colors (solid purple face with orange body).

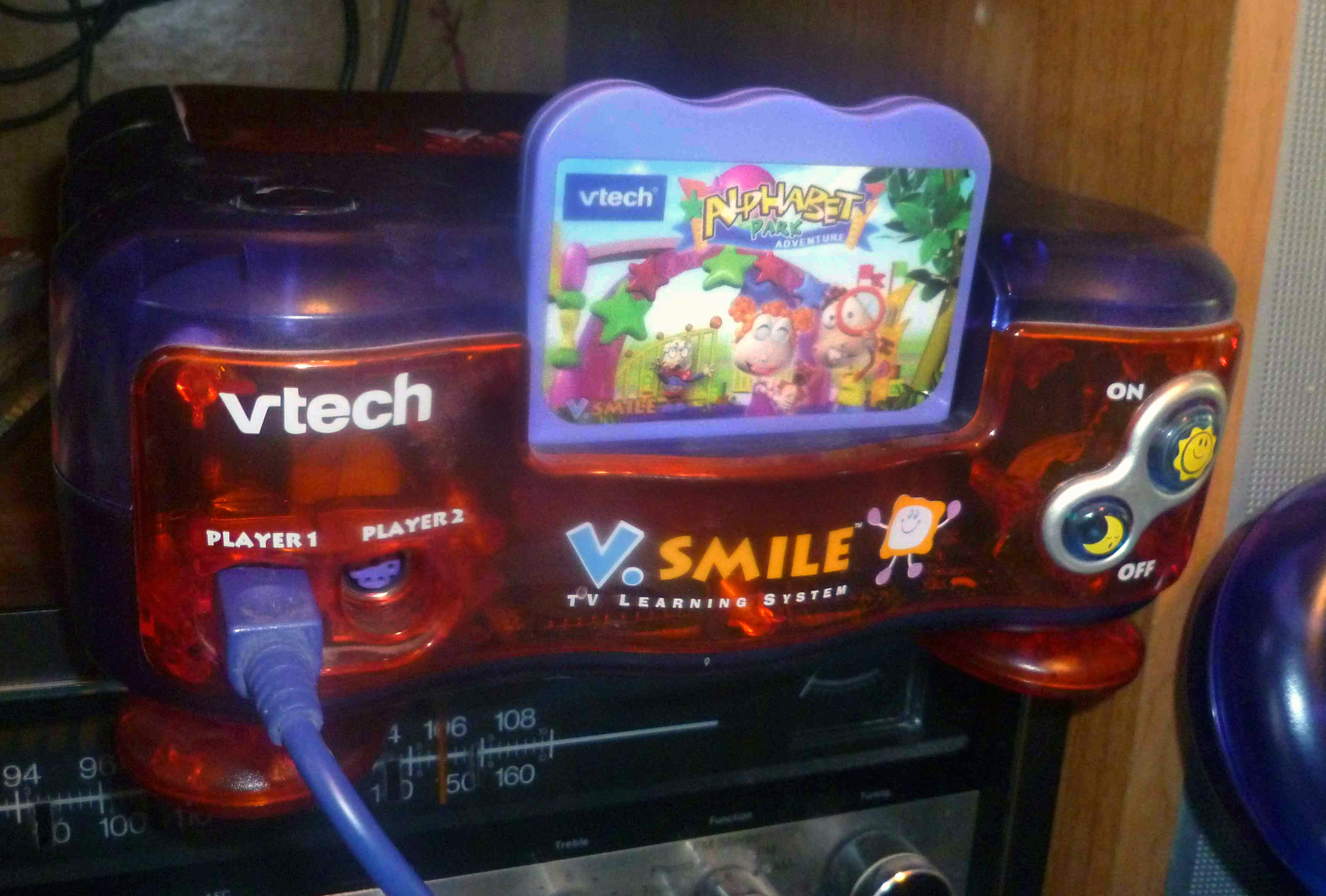
An English Special Edition of the V.Smile included two controllers, a "smartridge", meaning a smart cartridge, and a console with reversed body colors. the game currently being input is titled "Alphabet Park Adventure".

The last revision of the console (Model 1086) was the smallest of the main line, becoming shorter and square in shape, it retains 2 controller ports, but it adds V-Link functionality, and the cartridge storage on the back removed the cover and became smaller with space for only 4 games. The console also drops stereo sound, having a video and mono audio jack, instead of looping back it shows "please insert a learning game".

=== V.Smile Pocket and V.Smile Cyber Pocket ===
The V.Smile Pocket is a handheld version of the V.Smile console, released on September 10, 2004. It features a built-in Passive matrix-based color LCD and a monaural speaker, but is otherwise similar to the desktop console counterpart. However, there is no connector for an additional joystick, and thus many games that support two player mode will disallow access selection of the said mode. The device is not compatible with games that uses any of the other accessories due to the lack of an additional joystick port.

A second V.Smile Pocket model was introduced in 2007, in which a microphone is added to the device. Apart from the new feature, added support for games that use the microphone, and a repositioning of the speaker from the lower right to the upper left, it retained the appearance of the first V.Smile Pocket model. The game system is larger than devices such as the Game Boy Advance or Nintendo DS, although the V.Smile Pocket uses full size Smartridges from the console.

A third generation called V.Smile Cyber Pocket was introduced in 2008. The console was redesigned with a smaller flip-open screen (still Passive matrix-based) and an integrated graphics tablet, while retaining the microphone introduced in the second generation V.Smile Pocket. A proprietary port was added to the console, which a flash drive-like device called the "V-Link" with a matching proprietary connector on one end and a USB connector on another, could plug into the Cyber Pocket. This device is used to transfer the data of games that support such function to a PC, which would in turn upload the data to a website. The data could then be used to chart the player's progress as well as be used to unlock bonus games on the said website.

=== PC Pal ===
The PC Pal, released on June 20, 2008, is a variant of the basic V.Smile console with an integrated accessory, a more colorful and functional version of the Smart Keyboard accessory with built-in joystick and tablet controls. Unlike a regular V.Smile system, the V.Smile PC Pal has a port for the V-Link accessory. It comes bundled with a Smartridge of games for the keyboard that teach typing and other basic keyboard skills. The main unit looks like a standard V.Smile system with the name "PC Pal" printed on it. It can play all Smartridges, but since the joystick controls are built into the keyboard, the setup is more easily used on a desktop surface with a small TV serving as a monitor, similar to a personal computer. For someone who already owns a V.Smile, the Smart Keyboard accessory and a touch tablet enhanced joystick will provide a similar experience. Since the keyboard can be disconnected and a standard joystick or other V.Smile accessory used, the PC Pal can function as a normal V.Smile system.

=== V.Motion and V.Smile Motion ===
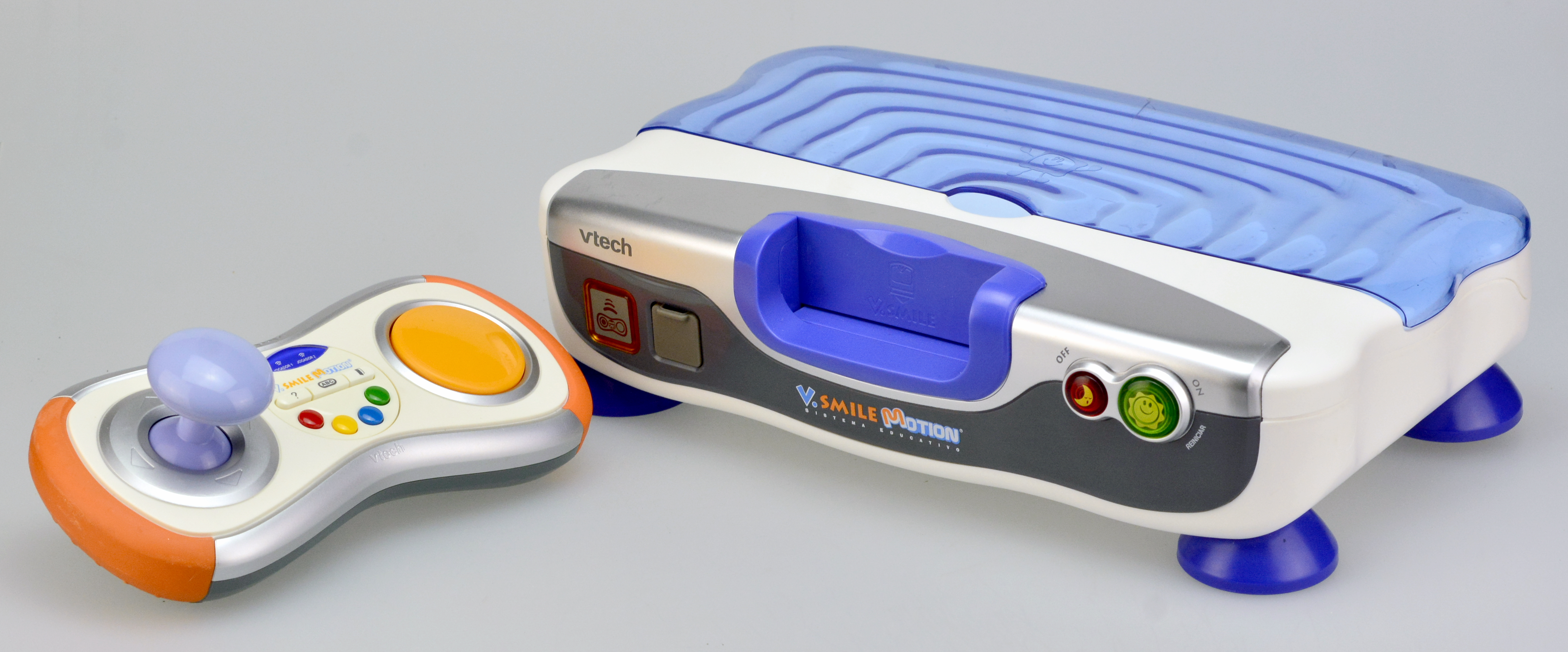
Portuguese V.Smile Motion. This model lacks a V-Link port.

A newer variant of the V.Smile is the V.Motion Active Learning System (Model 788) or V.Smile Motion, released in September 2007. It uses built-in wireless controller with accelerometers that detect three axes of movement. The controller can be tilted in a direction to achieve a result on the screen. The V.Motion controller is adaptable by handedness.

Titles released after the V.Motion system are designed to use its motion controls. However, the traditional joystick directional control can be used, and all Smartridge titles can be played across the V.Smile line of systems. The system's storage compartment can hold up to nine Smartridges.

=== Accessories ===
- The V.Smile TV Learning System Plus Joystick includes a built-in writing pad and stylus. The joystick with writing pad works on both the original V.Smile and the New V.Smile TV Learning System, and can be used to take advantage of newer Smartridges that use the writing pad functionality in games.
- The V.Smile Smart Keyboard is a PC-like keyboard that can be connected to a V.Smile System console. It includes several activities and lessons that teach typing, letters, spelling, and logic.
- The V.Smile Smartbook includes the "Smartbook" - an interface with a stylus that holds activity books and works together with Smartridges (an idea pioneered by Sega with their Sega Pico and Japan-only Advanced Pico Beena educational gaming systems).
- The V.Smile Art Studio is a large touch pad and stylus device that allows for "paintings" to appear on screen. Interactive stamps, color palette, picture drawing, color mixing, animation maker, coloring-in pictures are some of the features of the Art Studio. It comes with an Art Studio specific Smartridge.
- The V.Smile V-Link is an accessory that works only with the Cyber Pocket, PC Pal, V.Motion systems, and a few of the newer V.Smiles. It allows the user to track their progress by keeping the accessory plugged into the Game Console where it automatically tracks a child's progress and scores. When plugging the V.Link into a PC's USB port, it auto connects to a secure website where the child can see how they rank against all V.Smile players also using V-Link. As children play more of their Smartridges and master more skills, they are rewarded with online bonus games that are "unlocked" by their progress.
- The V.Smile Jammin' Gym Class is similar to dance pads made popular by Dance Dance Revolution. It is called a "soft exercise mat for interactive play, dance and exercise" by VTech. It includes 10 different active learning activities and connects directly to either the V.Smile TV Learning System or the V.Smile V.Motion with the Jammin' Gym Class cartridge. It helps teach letters, numbers, colors, spelling, and health concepts.

== Competition and comparisons ==
The V.Motion was introduced as a low-cost, educational alternative to the popular Wii console, to which it has been compared due to its use of motion controllers.

The V.Smile Pocket's direct competition is the handheld Leapster by LeapFrog.

Rough comparisons in technological capability with the V.Smile consoles in terms of graphics and sound can be made to Nintendo's SNES console, thus generally the V.Smile is technologically comparable to most fourth generation consoles despite being released in the seventh generation era.

== Games ==
Many educational game Smartridges for the V.Smile involve licensed characters popular with children. Some of these properties include Scooby-Doo, Bob the Builder, The Little Mermaid, Go, Diego, Go!, and The Wiggles.

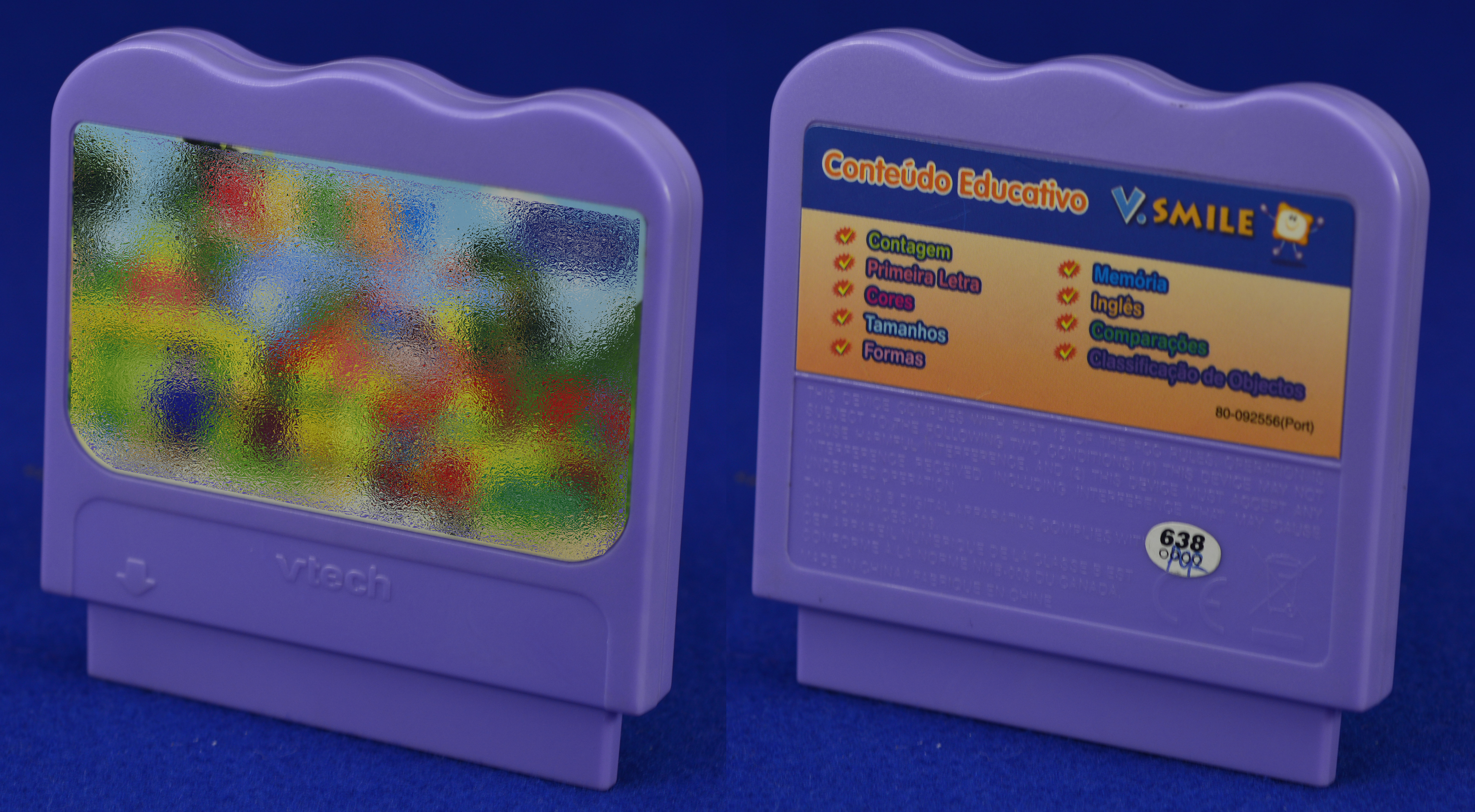
A normal light purple "smartridge", with a sprigged pin protector, and educational contents table on the backside

Several games were released in different countries, and as a result of the console being aimed at younger children who might not know English, they were translated into their respective languages. The games also have a suggested age range on the box, that sometimes changes depending on which country it was released in. The Console and its games were sometimes distributed by different companies, such as Concentra in Portugal, and Giochi Preziosi in Italy.

Some V.Smile games were rereleased with V.Motion functionality. All Smartridge titles are compatible with the V.Smile family of systems including the original V.Smile system, V.Motion, V.Smile Pocket, and Cyber Pocket.

There are known unreleased titles, Adventures in Oz, which was listed on Amazon by VTech in 2004 before the console was released, but it is unknown if it was ever developed or when it was cancelled. and also, the German VTech plans to make an untitled Bumba game, it was cancelled in the Netherlands and in Germany.

== V.Smile Baby Infant Development System ==
V.Smile Baby Infant Development System
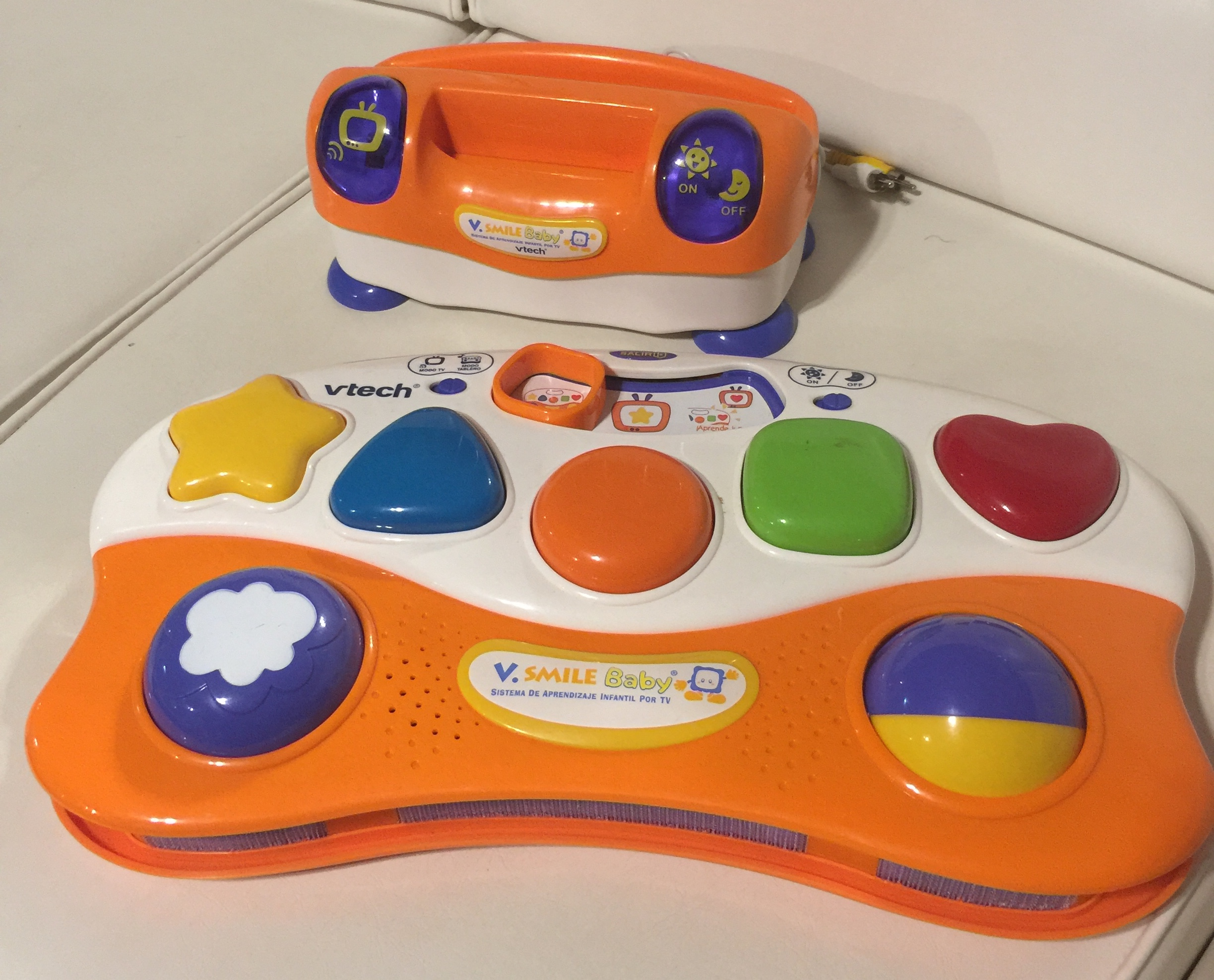
- A Spanish V.Smile Baby system (Model 690)
- Manufacturer: VTech
- Product family: V.Smile
- Type: Video game console
- Generation: Sixth / Seventh
- Released: 2006
- Media: ROM cartridge

An unrelated and separate spin-off system called the V.Smile Baby Infant Development System, was released shortly after the original V.Smile was introduced to the market. The games and cartridges of a V.Smile Baby are not compatible with a regular V.Smile and vice versa. This is an important distinction since so many of the other consoles named "V.Smile" are inter-compatible. The control system for the V.Smile Baby system is significantly different from those used in the original V.Smile that is targeted at older children: it does not have the features of a typical game controller, instead the design is more like that of a playboard. The controls consist of a mode slider, two switches (one for power and the other toggles the board between standalone play mode and console control mode), 7 buttons (5 shape buttons, a "fun" button, a small Exit button), and a roller ball hooked up to a sensor. The controller itself has a speaker which comes into play during standalone mode (in which it functions as a playboard that play music, speech and sound when interacted with). The controller communicates with the console by means of infrared signaling, and runs off six AA (Lithium) batteries. It also lacks a pink variant for girls, V.Smile Baby only ships with orange and blue color schemes.

The console itself is rather unusual in design, having only an on-off switch and permanently attached cables carrying composite video signal and mono audio through two RCA connectors. It runs off four AA (Lithium) batteries or a 6V DC power supply (sold separately), although European systems are missing the DC-in port, only being able to use batteries. The console has a cartridge slot as well as indents to hold four additional cartridges for storage. Also, powering off the controller will also power off the console if the console is switched on at the time. It was designed for kids ages 9 months-3 Years old.

It was released in several countries with different names;

Country	Name	Tagline	Age Range
(United States) (United Kingdom)	V.Smile Baby Infant Development System	Learning Grows As Baby Grows!	9-36 Months
(Spain)	V.Smile Baby Sistema De Aprendizaje Infantil Por TV	N/A	1-3 Years
(France)	V.Smile Baby	Un système évolutif spécialement conçu pour l'éveil des tout-petits!	1-3 Years
(Sweden)	V.Smile Baby Utvecklingssystem För Spädbarn	Lärandet växer med barnet!	9-36 Months

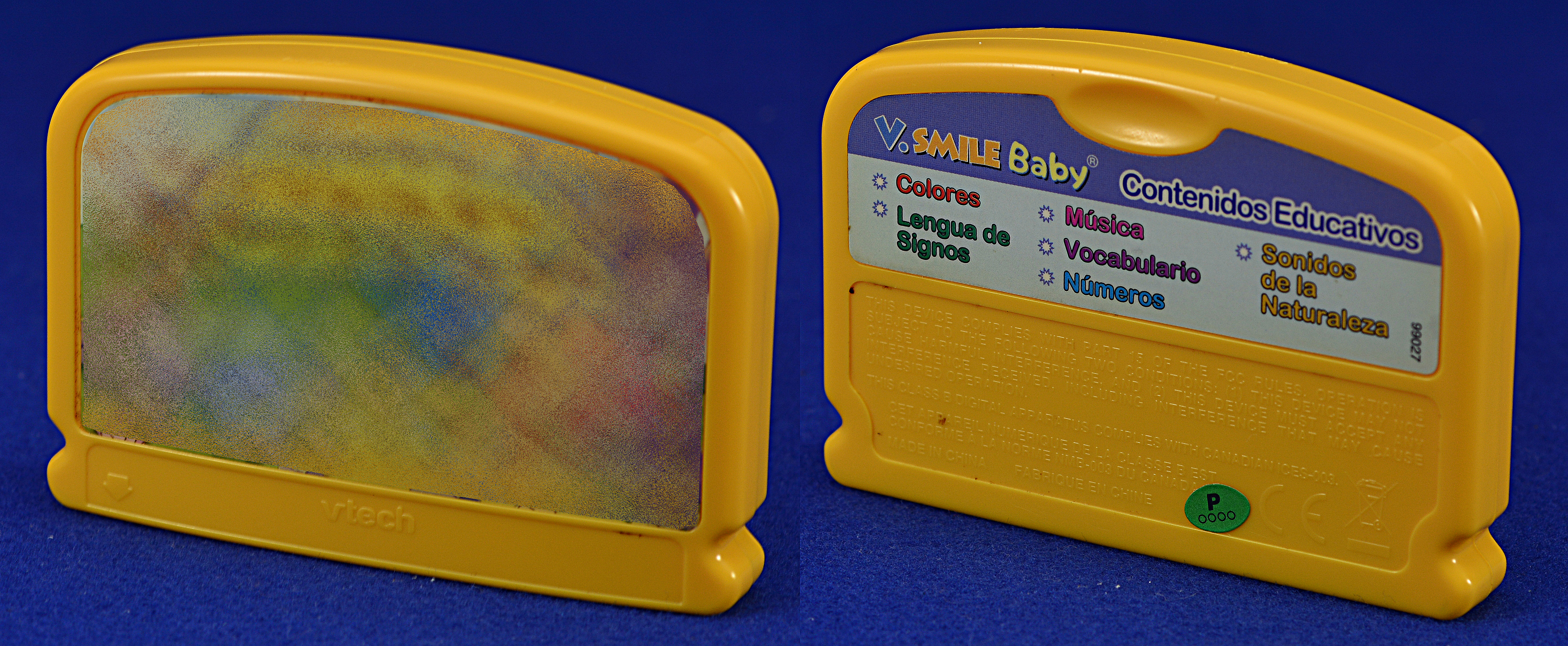
The Baby cartridge is more rounded, with normal exposed pins, but it still retains the educational contents table on the backside.

== Region protection and inter-compatibility ==
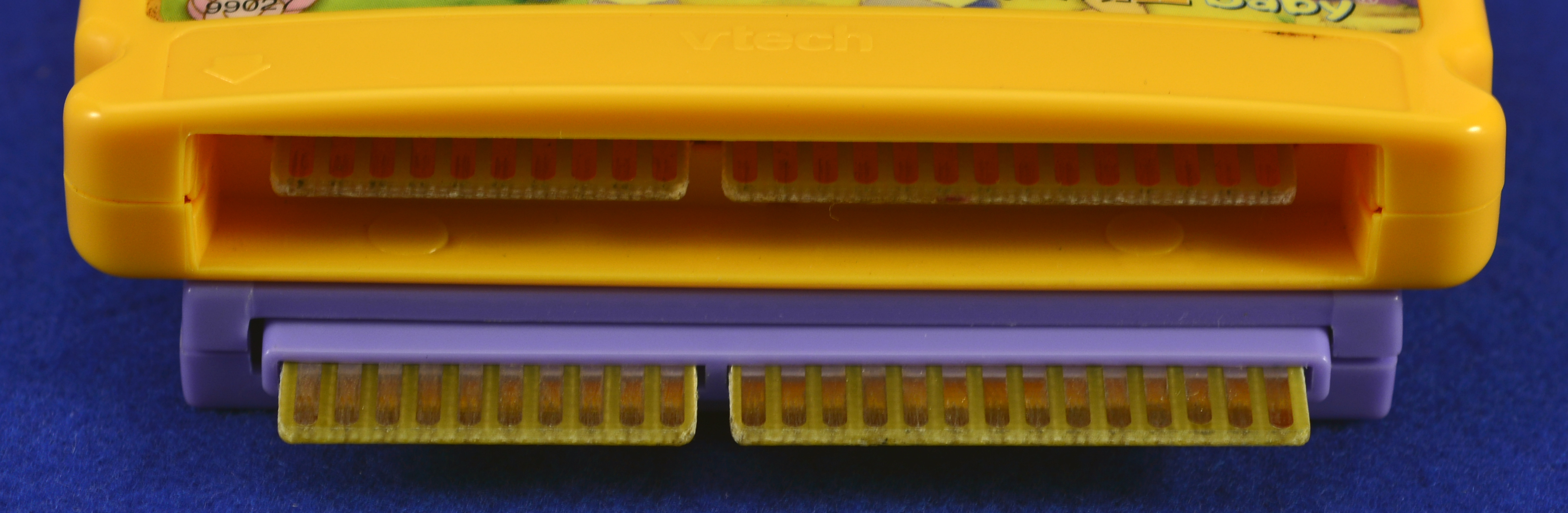
The pins in both V.Smile and V.Smile Baby cartridges are the same, although both systems are not compatible with each other.

Even though the V.Smile range of games are compatible with most of its consoles, the V.Smile Baby games aren't. The cartridges are shorter, but are also thicker and wider than normal V.Smile ones, meaning they can't fit on other systems. However, both cartridges have the same connector and pins, meaning V.Smile Smartridges, which are slimmer and narrower, can be physically inserted into the V.Smile Baby and connected, although it's harder to do so, and the game won't work with the console.

The V.Smile range of consoles are apparently not region-locked. While the console itself come in NTSC and PAL versions and the BIOS on the consoles appear to be region specific (distinguishable from the speech sample played in the screen after the VTech logo when the console is started with no cartridge inserted), games purchased from an NTSC region can play on PAL systems and vice versa. Observations suggest that both the V.Smile and V.Smile Infant Development System used different methods of booting: The V.Smile and V.Smile Pocket variants will apparently boot into their own BIOS, then obligingly run the software on the cartridge.

The V.Smile Baby appears to boot from the default BIOS when a cartridge of the same region is inserted or when there's no cartridge in the system, but appears to boot from a different BIOS when a cartridge of a different region is inserted. Currently it is unknown if the extra BIOS resides on the cartridge or on the console itself.

== Reception ==
Research by the American Academy of Pediatrics (AAP) and the National Institutes of Health (NIH) show that Vtech's V.Smile Baby product, marketed for ages nine months to three years, may not meet the claims that it helps with early childhood development or education in any way, stating that children ages 0 to 2 years are basically too young to understand anything and many cannot watch TV.

On October 17, 2011, AAP's Council on Communications and media released a report titled Media Use by Children Younger than 2 Years concluded that "the educational merit of media for children younger than two years remains unproven despite the fact that three-quarters of the top selling infant videos make explicit or implicit educational claims," and further found that media viewing by children under 2 years of age can have a negative effect on language development.

Video game and technology critics are also quick to discount Vtech's line of products, including V.Smile (ages 4–8), V.Smile Baby (ages 9m–3), V.Flash (ages 6–10), V.Smile Pocket (ages 3–8), and V.Reader, citing the lack of professionally developed games, as VTech consoles had no major third party video game publishers by 2009 aside from Disney Interactive.

Critics also state that the V.Smile proves the notion that the need for special electronics for children is artificial, as products like mainstream consoles (Xbox, PlayStation, Wii), tablets (iPad, Android), and computers (PC, Mac) have a variety of educational and children's software. Furthermore, such devices offer flexibility that allows children to grow with them, not outgrow them.

== See also ==
- V.Flash
- VTech Socrates
- VTech
