= VTech =

Hong Kongese company of children's electronic learning products

VTech Holdings Limited
- Logo since 2001
- Type: Public
- Traded as: SEHK: 0303
- Industry: Electronics industry
- Founded: October 1976; 50 years ago (as Video Technology Limited)
- Founder: Allan Wong (Chi-Yun); Stephen Leung
- Headquarters: Tai Ping Industrial Centre Block 1, 23rd Floor; 57 Ting Kok Tai Po N.t. Rd., 23/f, Tai Po, Hong Kong
- Area served: Worldwide
- Products: Residential phones; Educational toys; Electronic manufacturing services; Small-medium sized business phones; Hotel phones; Cordless headsets; Integrated access devices; Baby monitors
- Revenue: US$1,898.9 million (FY2014)
- Net income: US$203.3 million (FY2014)
- Number of employees: Around 30,000
- Subsidiaries: Advanced American Telephones; LeapFrog; Snom; Gigaset Communications
- Website: www.vtech.com

VTech Holdings Ltd.
- Traditional Chinese: 偉易達集團
- Simplified Chinese: 伟易达集团
Transcriptions
Standard Mandarin
- Hanyu Pinyin: Wěi yì dá jítuán
Yue: Cantonese
- Yale Romanization: wáih yihk daaht jaahptyùhn
- Jyutping: wai^{5} jik^{6} daat^{6} zaap^{6}tyun^{4}

VTech
- Traditional Chinese: 偉易達
- Simplified Chinese: 伟易达
Transcriptions
Standard Mandarin
- Hanyu Pinyin: Wěi yì dá
Yue: Cantonese
- Yale Romanization: wáih yihk daaht
- Jyutping: wai^{5} jik^{6} daat^{6}

VTech Holdings Limited (an abbreviation of Video Technology Limited or simply VTech) is a Hong Kong electronics company founded in October 1976 by Allan Wong (Chi-Yun) and Stephen Leung. It is known for manufacturing cordless phones, baby monitors, and electronic learning toys, as well as providing contract manufacturing services.

== Name and listing ==
The company was originally named "Video Technology Limited" in reference to the company's first product, a home video game console. In 1991, it was renamed "VTech Holdings Limited" to reflect a wider portfolio of products.

The company was first listed in Hong Kong in June 1986 under the name "Video Technology International (Holdings) Limited". It was privatised and delisted from The Stock Exchange of Hong Kong Limited in 1990.

VTech obtained a primary listing on the London Stock Exchange in 1991. In 1992, the company relisted on The Stock Exchange of Hong Kong Limited, establishing a dual primary listing with London. In 1993, the company established its American depositary receipt programme.

VTech was delisted voluntarily from the London Stock Exchange on 7 October 2008. It also terminated its American Depositary Receipt programme with effect from 21 January 2011.

== History ==
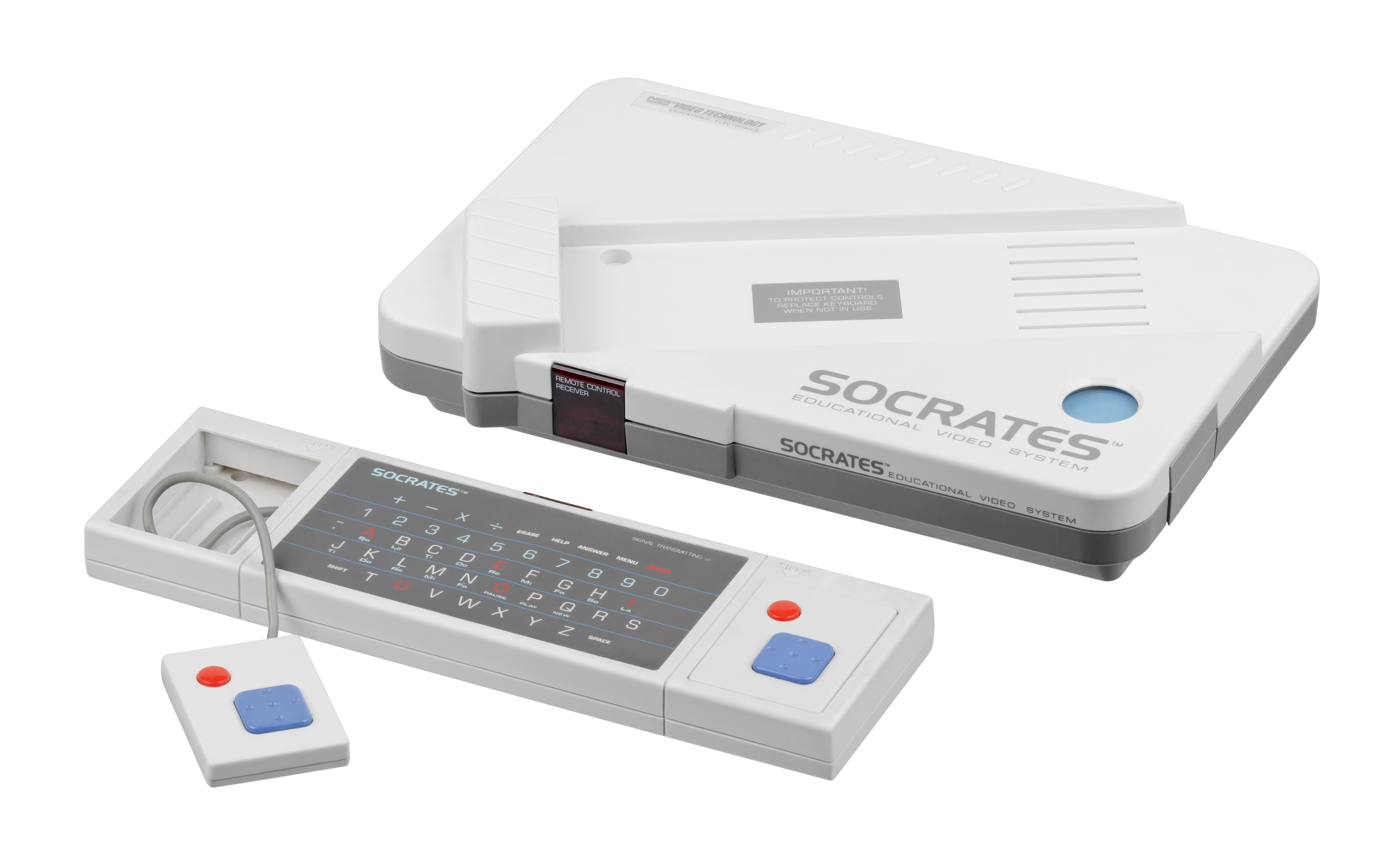
VTech has developed edutainment consoles since 1988, their first being the Socrates.

VTech was founded in Hong Kong in October 1976 by two local entrepreneurs, Allan Wong (Chi-Yun) and Stephen Leung. When the first single-chip microprocessor, the Intel 4004, became available in the early 1970s, the company saw the potential it offered for portable consumer electronics products. Wong & Leung set up a small factory in To Kwa Wan, with a US$40,000 investment and a staff of 40 people. In the first year, turnover was less than $1 million.

VTech initially focused on developing video games. In 1977, the company created its first home TV game console, a version of Pong. Since only consumers in North America and Europe could afford such items, the company targeted primarily these markets.

The United Kingdom was chosen as the first market for Pong, as Hong Kong and the UK used the same standard for television systems. In 1978, the founders introduced LED games they had developed to buyers from RadioShack in the US, which were sold under the RadioShack brand.

VTech then began to build its own brand. Starting in the early 1980s, a line of electronic games would be manufactured. VTech unveiled its first electronic learning product, called Lesson One, at the New York Toy Fair, in February 1980. It taught children basic spelling and maths. An exclusive version under the name Computron was offered to Sears, with the product being prominently advertised by Sears, in its catalogue, which was a popular shopping guide.

Next, VTech made the video game console CreatiVision. An electronic product with an external projector from French company Ludotronic was adapted by VTech and sold as the VTech ProScreen in 1984, following the release of VTech's Gamate and Variety handheld products the year prior.

VTech then branched out into personal computers, including a series of 8-bit TRS-80 competition computers named the Laser 200, 210, and 310, as well as a series of IBM PC compatibles both beginning in 1983, followed by Apple II compatible computers, beginning in 1985, including a model called Laser 128. After acquiring PC manufacturer Leading Technology of Oregon in 1992, VTech exited the personal computer market in 1997 due to tight competition.

In 1985, the United States Federal Communications Commission (FCC) allocated the frequency band 900 MHz to ISM (industrial, scientific, and medical) devices. Taking advantage of this, VTech began development on a cordless telephone, using the 900 MHz band, and in 1991 introduced the world's first fully digital 900 MHz cordless telephone.

In 2000, to expand its cordless phone business, VTech acquired the consumer telephone business of Lucent Technologies. The acquisition also gave VTech the exclusive right for 10 years to use the AT&T brand in conjunction with the manufacture and sale of wireline telephones and accessories in the United States and Canada. Although the acquisition increased sales of VTech's telecommunication products by 50%, it led to operating losses and write-offs. The company issued a profit warning in March 2001 and launched a broad restructuring plan. By the financial year 2002, the company had turned around the business and returned to profitability.

Today, VTech's core businesses remain cordless telephones and electronic learning products. Its contract manufacturing services – which manufactures various electronic products on behalf of medium-sized companies, have also become a major source of revenue. The company has diversified geographically, selling to North America, Europe, Asia, Latin America, the Middle East, and Africa.

== Core businesses ==
=== Electronic learning products (ELPs) ===
VTech was among the pioneers of the ELP industry, beginning in 1980 with a unit designed to teach children basic spelling and mathematics. Today VTech makes both individual standalone products and platform products that combine a variety of consoles with different software. Its V.Smile TV Learning System, which was launched in 2004, established what the company calls platform products as an important category within its ELPs. In 2005, the Smart Start category got the first few products under the VTech Baby brand, including V.Smile Baby (nothing to do with VTech Baby), it is the first time they used a separate brand for its infant and toddler line since Little Smart (Lörni in Germany) until 2003.

In 2007, the company picked up the rights from Studio 100 (e.g. Plop the Gnome, and Bumba) (Netherlands), Babar (France), and Caillou (Spain), in this year we released Whiz Kid Learning System and Kidizoom (in 2008 it was broadened the camera to not stop using after the age of six, due to seven and eight year olds still using Kidizooms.)

In 2009, they released another gaming console, the V.Baby, it has been released with the VTech Baby brand in Europe (except Spain which they used the V.Baby logo but uses the normal VTech logo due to V.Baby being short for VTech Baby), but it is unknown where it was released in Germany or Netherlands.

In 2011, the Winnie the Pooh movie toys were released, including Pooh Learning Phone, Pooh’s Adventure Book, and 2-in-1 Baby Activity Walker, only Pooh’s Adventure Book is a Europe exclusive. There are more non-Pooh toys released the same year, including Peek at Me Bunny, Care & Learn Teddy, Grow & Discover Music Studio, and 2-in-1 Discovery Table, Lightning McQueen Digital Camera (Pre-K and up), Team Lightning McQueen Laptop (Pre-K to K), Lightning McQueen Learn & Go (K to 1st Grade), and Lightning McQueen Learning Laptop (K to 1st Grade).

In 2012, the company released two new toy lines from the VTech Baby line: The World of Cody & Cora and Lil'Critters. In 2014, two of the most popular franchises, Go! Go! Smart Wheels and The World of Cody & Cora were released on InnoTab, the former franchise's game is just a collection of minigames, the latter franchise's game is a writing software. In 2016, the Animal Friends mascots of VTech Baby got redesigned.

In 2013, they introduced the toy plush bear connectable to PC, the Cody the Smart Cub and Cora the Smart Cub, they also introduced InnoTab 2 Baby, a return from baby console market since V.Baby, including a simple Noah's Ark e-book, sing-along nursery rhyme songs, and drawing and coloring activities. In that year, they released the Go! Go! Smart Animals line, with the initial animals are monkey, tiger, lion, hippo, giraffe, elephant, zebra and alligator, and additional 3 are found in Zoo Explorers Playset, Forest Adventure Playset and Tree House Hideaway Playset.

Around 2016, the company picked up rights for Woozle and Pip in the Netherlands. Latest additions to the platform product range are MobiGo, InnoTab Max, Kidizoom Smart Watch and InnoTV (StorioTV in France and Germany).

=== Telecommunication (TEL) products ===
VTech introduced the world's first 900 MHz and 5.8 GHz cordless phones in 1991 and 2002 respectively. As of 2014, the company was the world's largest manufacturer of cordless telephones, according to MZA (as reported by VTech).

As of 2014, VTech, in its sale of both AT&T and VTech branded phones and accessories, was the largest player in the industry, in North America, according to MarketWise Consumer Insights (as reported by VTech). Outside North America, as of this date, VTech mainly supplied products to fixed-line telephone operators, brand names, and distributors on an ODM basis.

=== Contract manufacturing services (CMS) ===
VTech started manufacturing products for other brand names on an original equipment manufacturing (OEM) basis in the 1980s and CMS became one of the company's core businesses in the early 2000s.

VTech has been identified as one of the world's top 50 electronics manufacturing services providers, providing electronics manufacturing services for medium-sized companies. VTech's CMS has focused on four main product categories: professional audio equipment, switching mode power supplies, wireless products, and solid-state lighting.

== Controversies ==
=== 2012 working conditions controversy ===
A June 2012 report from the Institute for Global Labour and Human Rights said the working conditions in the VTech factories in China failed to meet the legal standards and could be described as sweatshops. VTech strongly rejected the allegations in a statement issued on 22 June 2012.

=== 2015 data breach ===
In November 2015, Lorenzo Bicchierai, writing for Vice magazine's Motherboard, reported that VTech's servers had been compromised and the corporation was victim to a data breach which exposed personal data belonging to 6.3 million individuals, including children, who signed up for or utilized services provided by the company related to several products it manufactures. Bicchierai was contacted by the unnamed attacker in late November, during the week before Thanksgiving, at which point the unnamed individual disclosed information about the security vulnerabilities with the journalist and detailed the breach.

Bicchierai then reached out to information security researcher Troy Hunt to examine data provided by the attacker to Bicchierai, and to confirm if the leak was indeed authentic and not an internet hoax. Hunt examined the information and confirmed it appeared to be authentic. Hunt then dissected the data in detail and published the findings on his website. According to Hunt, VTech's servers failed to utilize basic SSL encryption to secure the personal data in transit from the devices to VTech's servers; that VTech stored customer information in unencrypted plaintext, failed to securely hash or salt passwords.

The attack leveraged an SQL injection to gain privileged root access to VTech servers. Once privileged access was acquired, the attacker exfiltrated the data, including some 190 gigabytes of photographs of children and adults, detailed chat logs between parents and children which spanned over the course of years, and voice recordings, all unencrypted and stored in plain text. The attacker shared some 3,832 image files with the journalist for verification purposes, and some redacted photographs were published by the journalist. Commenting on the leak, the unidentified hacker expressed their disgust with being able to so easily obtain access to such a large trove of data, saying: "Frankly, it makes me sick that I was able to get all this stuff. VTech should have the book thrown at them" and explained their rationale for going to the press was because they felt VTech would have ignored their reports and concerns.

VTech corporate security was unaware their systems had been compromised and the breach was first brought to their attention after being contacted by Bicchierai prior to the publication of the article. Upon notification, the company took a dozen or so websites and services offline.

In an FAQ published by the company, they explain some 4,854,209 accounts belonging to parents and 6,368,509 profiles belonging to children had been compromised. The company further claims the passwords had been encrypted, which is contrary to reports by the independent security researcher contacted by Vice. The company indicated they were working with unspecified "local authorities". VTech subsequently brought in the information security services company FireEye to manage incident response and audit the security of their platform going forward.

Mark Nunnikhoven of Trend Micro criticized the company's handling of the incident and called their FAQ "wishy-washy corporate speak". U.S. Senator Edward Markey and Representative Joe Barton, co-founders of the Bi-Partisan Congressional Privacy Caucus, issued an open letter to the company inquiring as to why and what kind of information belonging to children is stored by VTech and how they use this data, security practices employed to protect that data if children's information is shared or sold to third parties and how the company complies with the Children's Online Privacy Protection Act. In February 2016, Hunt publicized the fact that VTech had modified its Terms and Conditions for new customers so that the customer acknowledges and agrees that any information transmitted to VTech may be intercepted or later acquired by unauthorized parties. In January 2018, the US Federal Trade Commission fined VTech $650,000 for the breach, around $0.09 per victim.
