= List of Adventures of the Gummi Bears episodes =

Adventures of the Gummi Bears is an American animated television series. The series aired on Saturday mornings on NBC from 1985 to 1989. It moved to ABC in the fall of 1989, where it aired as part of The Gummi Bears/Winnie the Pooh Hour until January 1990. In the fall of 1990, the series became a part of Disney's weekday afternoon syndicated cartoon block, The Disney Afternoon. Season 6 premiered as part of The Disney Afternoon, with new episodes interspersed with reruns of previous ones. In total, there are 95 individual 11-minute and 22-minute episodes, which make up 65 half hours.

== Series overview ==
Season	Segments	Episodes	Originally released	
Season	Segments	Episodes	First released	Last released
1	21	13	September 14, 1985	December 21, 1985
2	12	8	September 13, 1986	November 29, 1986
3	14	8	September 12, 1987	December 12, 1987
4	16	10	September 10, 1988	December 17, 1988
5	13	9	September 9, 1989	January 6, 1990
6	19	17	September 10, 1990	February 22, 1991

== Episodes ==
=== Background ===
Seasons 1–5 are listed here in their original U.S. network episode order. In the original network run from season 2 onward, some 11-minute segments originally aired mixed with repeats; when the show was distributed internationally, the segments were combined into standardized half-hour combinations. (Season 5 had an odd number of 11-minute segments; "Never Give a Gummi an Even Break" is coupled with the season 6 segment "Friar Tum" in the "international" order.)

(The episode arrangements for the Disney Afternoon airings were completely different, with half-length segments from different seasons mixed together. These versions subsequently aired on The Disney Channel, Toon Disney, and the Family Channel in Canada.)

Season 6 premiered as part of The Disney Afternoon. The order and airdates presented here correspond to the first airings of the new episodes on TDA. Three of these were 11-minute episodes, "Friar Tum", "Zummi in Slumberland", and "A Recipe for Trouble", which each aired in the U.S. coupled with a segment from a previous season; here, each of them is listed by itself. However, in international markets, season 6 was presented in a different order than in the U.S., and these segments were grouped together into two half-hours (with "Friar Tum" being coupled with the leftover season 5 segment "Never Give a Gummi an Even Break"). This is why some episode guides list "Friar Tum/Never Give a Gummi an Even Break" and "Zummi in Slumberland/A Recipe for Trouble", which is how the episodes were presented internationally. (Also, though most consider the two-part "King Igthorn" story to be the series finale, and it comes last in the international episode order, six more episodes premiered after it in the U.S., over a two-week period in February 1991.)

Two numbers are given for each episode: One number corresponding to the order in which it premiered in the U.S., and a second corresponding to Disney's official "international" order (with the 11-minute segments marked "a" or "b" to denote the first or second segment).

=== Season 1: 1985 ===
No. overall	No. in season	Title	Written by	Original release date
1	1	"A New Beginning"	Douglas Hutchinson	September 14, 1985
Cavin, a young page from Dunwyn Kingdom, becomes stranded in a nearby forest when ogres attack a group of woodcutters being protected by his superior, Sir Tuxford. The incident causes him to stumble upon the home of the fabled Gummi Bears, led by their elder Zummi, who discover he possesses a Gummi medallion - one that his grandfather gave him. When Cavin fails to convince the group to help him, after he learns that the ogres are being led by Duke Igthorn, a disgraced knight of Dunwyn, into attacking his home, Zummi finds that they must help when the medallion helps unlock an ancient Gummi spellbook which reveals that the Gummies must help the good defeat the wicked.
2a	2a	"The Sinister Sculptor"	Michael Maurer	September 21, 1985
Gruffi and Grammi constantly bicker with each other rather than work together. However, things change when a scheming sculptor captures their friends and uses a magical powder to turn them into statues to sell to King Gregor and his daughter, Princess Calla. With Cavin's help, the pair work to rescue their friends and recover the spell the sculptor possesses that can remove the powder's enchantment.
2b	2b	"Zummi Makes it Hot"	Douglas Hutchinson	September 21, 1985
Grammi is forced to create a new batch of Gummiberry juice, but Gummi Glen's supply of pure water, needed for the juice's recipe, has suddenly dried up. Zummi, who has begun practicing magic from the Great Book, leads her, Cubbi and Cavin to a pumping station, in order to fix the problem. However, he soon finds he must master his first spell quickly, when ogres close to the facility discover them in the area.
3a	3a	"Someday, My Prints Will Come"	Steve Huelett, Richard Hoag & Jymn Magon	September 28, 1985
Tummi discovers a mechanical device in one of the ancient storerooms of the Great Gummies, which can make fake dragon footprints. However, he accidentally starts the machine, which soon leaves footprints across the land, attracting not only the attention of Sir Tuxford and Dunwyn's knights, but a real dragon. The Gummies face the difficult task of fixing their mistake, especially when the dragon turns out not be as dangerous as it seems.
3b	3b	"Can I Keep Him?"	Bruce Talkington	September 28, 1985
Zummi gives Cubbi a whistle from his old treasure chest to help keep him happy within Gummi Glen. After being sent out by Gruffi for being a nuisance, he and Sunni quickly learn that the whistle can attract a brine dragon. Cubbi decides the pair should have some fun with their new friend, but this soon leads them on an unexpected adventure to Drekmore and an encounter with Duke Igthorn.
4	4	"A Gummi in a Gilded Cage"	Dianne Dixon & Jymn Magon	October 5, 1985
Gruffi suffers a nightmare about flying, and insists that the Gummies' new flying machine should be dismantled, despite Zummi believing it has use for them. Meanwhile, a group of bird-like creatures known as Carpies overhear Sunni singing, while she is helping to collect Gummiberries. Believing she will make a good pet songbird for their king, the Carpies kidnap her, forcing Zummi, Cubbi and Gruffi to pursue after them in their flying machine. When the Carpies force them to crash land, Zummi finds himself forced to rebuild it, while the others go rescue Sunni before the Carpie king learns of their presence.
5a	5a	"The Oracle"	Bruce Talkington	October 12, 1985
Tummi finds himself put on a diet by the others, after they decide his appetite is becoming too much of a problem. By accident, while exploring ancient Gummi tunnels that Zummi talked about, Tummi comes across an ancient Gummi mechanism inside a stone ogre head. Upon discovering Duke Igthorn and his ogres approaching it, believing it to be an oracle, he swiftly uses the device in hopes of tricking them into getting him food.
5b	5b	"When You Wish Upon a Stone"	Michael Mauer	October 12, 1985
Cavin resents being weak and small while training to be a knight, and puts forward his problems to the other Gummi bears. Believing he may know a solution, Cubbi suggest searching the Great Book for an answer. The pair soon learn of a magical stone that grants wishes and so decide to search for it. However, they soon discover it is being guard by a giant with a mean temper, leading Cavin to discover that there is more to being a knight than he realized.
6	6	"A Gummi by Any Other Name"	Douglas Hutchinson	October 26, 1985
Zummi makes a magic hat for Sunni which can change her appearance to anyone she wants to be, simply by speaking that person's name, allowing her to become Calla and see how royalty lives. At the same time, the real Calla asks Cavin for his help to escape her royal life and show her how peasants live. However, their plans become complicated when Igthorn's latest scheme sees both Calla and Sunni kidnapped. The Gummi bears soon learn of the situation, and with help from Cavin, work to rescue the pair, in the process entrusting Calla with the secret existence of the Gummi bears when she displays great courage under the tricky circumstances.
7a	7a	"Loopy, Go Home"	Douglas Hutchinson	November 2, 1985
Despite Gruffi's objections, Cubbi finds an orphaned wolf cub and raises it.
7b	7b	"A-Hunting We Will Go"	Kimberley Wells, Mike Lyons	November 2, 1985
King Gregor decides to take Sir Tuxord and Cavin with him to go hunting in Dunwyn Forest. However, after they have departed, a traveller arrives in Dunwyn claiming that a vicious wild boar is loose in the woods. Calla, fearing for the safety of the group, quickly seeks help. With Sunni and Grammi agreeing to assist, the group work to save Gregor, Tuxford and Cavin, before the boar can do harm to them.
8a	8a	"The Fence Sitter"	Bruce Talkington	November 9, 1985
A bird threatens the Gummiberry bushes, and nobody will listen to Cubbi's ideas to get rid of it.
8b	8b	"Night of the Gargoyle"	Michael Maurer	November 9, 1985
Igthorn manages to discreetly send in an ugly gargoyle figurine to King Gregor during Monarch's Day at Dunwyn Castle. Calla and Cavin, suspicious of the present, inform the Gummi bears of this, leading Zummi to discover that the figurine comes to life with moonlight and causes havoc to his surroundings. Leading Sunni and Cubbi to the castle, the Gummies find themselves seeking to stop it before it can damage the castle and harm Gregor.
9	9	"The Secret of the Juice"	Michael Maurer	November 23, 1985
Grammi believes it is time to teach another Gummi Bear how to make Gummiberry juice, after Igthron's ogres try to kidnap her. Sunni is chosen as the most eligible candidate, but she is more interested in spending time with Calla than learning the recipe. When Grammi is eventually captured and taken to Castle Drekmore, Zummi leads the others to rescue her, while leaving a message behind to warn Sunni of the trouble. When she and Calla learn of this, they soon go to assist in the rescue, giving Sunni a chance to prove she can make the juice as Grammi desires her to do.
10a	10a	"Sweet and Sour Gruffi"	Randal Case	November 30, 1985
A storm leaves part of Gummi Glen exposed, forcing the Gummi bears to work to fix the mess before King Gregor is due to pass the area while inspecting the damage the weather did in the area. However, they and Cavin disapprove of Gruffi's sour disposition. When Zummi casts a spell on him to change his behavior, after he accidentally damages the Great Book, the group soon find it causes more problems than it solves.
10b	10b	"Duel of the Wizards"	Douglas Hutchinson	November 30, 1985
The pompous wizard Don Gordo will not accept Zummi's help in finding his missing magic key (which was stolen by Duke Igthorn and Toadie), so a battle of magic ensues. Zummi and Gruffi must combine their respective preferred approaches of magic and muscle to not only defeat Don Gordo, but also Duke Igthorn and his ogres.
11a	11a	"What You See is Me"	Bob Langhans	December 7, 1985
Tummi, seeking to escape Grammi's insistent nagging for his help, gets into trouble when ogres find him. In escaping them, he finds himself befriending a blind shepherdess named Trina, who reveals how she is not helpless as she seems. This soon proves useful, when Igthorn comes looking for Tummi after his ogres report their failure to him.
11b	11b	"Toadie's Wild Ride"	Bruce Talkington	December 7, 1985
After Toadie loses crucial notes to Duke Igthorn's latest plan to conquer Dunwyn, Igthorn banishes and catapults him into the forest, where he accidentally makes his way into Gummi Glen and begins snooping around. When Tummi, who has been caught eating the other bears' picnic lunches and lying about it, sees him, no one believes him when he tries to tell them . . . until it is almost too late.
12a	12a	"Bubble Trouble"	Bruce Talkington	December 14, 1985
Sunni finds a baby cliff dragon with a hiccup, and a swig of Gummiberry juice only aggravates the problem.
12b	12b	"Gummi in a Strange Land"	Douglas Hutchinson	December 14, 1985
A Slumber Sprite puts Gruffi to sleep and causes to him to start sleepwalking, requiring Grammi and Cubbi to trek across hostile terrain and straight into Drekmore to find the sprite and keep Gruffi from suffering nasty accidents.
13	13	"Light Makes Right"	Michael Maurer	December 21, 1985
The Gummies find a Gummiscope, a gigantic machine that harnesses sunlight as a means of long-range communication, and hope to use it to make contact with the Great Gummies across the ocean. Unfortunately, it can also be used as a weapon, and Duke Igthorn wants to use it as a laser-type weapon to force King Gregor into surrendering Dunwyn Castle. Note: This is the final episode in which Gruffi, Sir Tuxford, and Toadie are all voiced by Bill Scott.

=== Season 2: 1986 ===
No. overall	No. in season	Title	Original release date
14	1	"Up, Up, and Away"	September 13, 1986
Chummi Gummi comes to Gummi Glen by balloon airship in search of a large community of Gummies. When the remaining Gummies tell him that they moved on long ago, he continues his search for them. Cubbi wants to leave with him so he can become a knight, but Chummi's flying ship presents another opportunity for Igthorn to claim rulership over Dunwyn. After the Gummies defeat Igthorn, Cubbi decides to stay in Gummi Glen and tells Chummi to tell the Great Gummies about the others and later gets knighted by Calla. Note: Due to the sudden death of Bill Scott in 1985, Corey Burton takes over the roles of Gruffi and Toadie while Roger C. Carmel takes over as Sir Tuxford. Only appearance of Chummi Gummi.
15a	2a	"Faster Than a Speeding Tummi"	September 20, 1986
Tummi has to clean up a big mess in Gummi Glen and bemoans that he is slow at the job. After tricking a tired Zummi into casting a spell on him, he learns that faster is not always more efficient when the spell proves unpredictable.
15b	2b	"For a Few Sovereigns More"	September 20, 1986
Duke Igthorn hires a bounty hunter, Flint Shrubwood, to catch a Gummi Bear, who ends up kidnapping Cubbi. Things soon turn bad for Igthorn when he refuses to pay, as well as the ogres when they attack the bounty hunter, as they all end up kidnapped and locked in the bounty hunter's citadel. Igthorn, who is chained to Cubbi, manages to escape, and Cubbi considers what being a knight is all about by spending time with Igthorn, which culminates into honoring a promise. Note: Zummi, Gruffi, Tummi, and Sunni do not appear in this episode. Special Note: This episode contains multiple references to Clint Eastwood and his films, particularly his portrayal of the Man with No Name.
16a	3a	"Over the River and Through the Trolls"	October 4, 1986
Trolls try to hijack a shipment of gold protected by Sir Gawain. Cavin pleads for the Gummies to help, as Sir Gawain is not only Cavin's grandfather, but was also the person who discovered Zummi's medallion. Note: Tummi, Sunni, and Cubbi appear in this episode, but none of them speak. As of this episode, some scenes in the opening sequence have been updated. Initially, it only contained scenes from season one episodes, but some scenes from the first two season two episodes have now been swapped in.
16b	3b	"You Snooze, You Lose"	October 4, 1986
Igthorn puts Dunwyn to sleep, leaving only Calla, Cavin, and the Gummi Bears to protect the castle. Note: This is Calla's third time drinking Gummiberry juice and gaining the super strength granted by it.
17	4	"The Crimson Avenger"	October 18, 1986
When Cubbi claims he is serious about Calla's knighthood from "Up, Up, & Away," the annoyed Gummies suggest he go into the forest to be a hero. After saving some people, Cubbi gets the reputation as "the Crimson Avenger." Although Cubbi has done a good job by protecting people from a highwayman trying to rob them, the thief elects to move into Dunwyn Castle – along with chances for juicier crimes, which end up causing problems for Calla, Cavin, and King Gregor. Notes: There's a cameo of the poacher from "Loopy, Go Home" in this episode. Another character says, "And that's the way it is," which is a nod to Walter Cronkite.
18a	5a	"A Hard Dazed Knight"	October 18, 1986
Duke Igthorn sneaks into Dunwyn Castle and hands King Gregor a magical egg that turns the king into a crystal statue. Igthorn then says that he will destroy the egg (and thus kill King Gregor) unless the people of Dunwyn accept him as their new king. Gruffi and Calla use their engineering skills to rebuild a mechanical knight the old Gummies made to infiltrate Drekmore Castle and recapture the egg. Notes: Zummi, Tummi, and Cubbi appear in this episode, but do not speak, despite their lips moving when the bears speak in unison at one point. In addition, Calla sports her previous Crimson Avenger disguise from the previous episode, re-fashioning it to resemble a squire's outfit. Next, this is the second episode in which Calla appears without Cavin. Finally, this is Roger C. Carmel's final performance as Sir Tuxford.
18b	5b	"Do Unto Ogres"	October 18, 1986
Sunni creates a growing potion while Toadie is cast out by Duke Igthorn . . . again. The two meet to unexpected results. Note: Cubbi appears in this episode, but does not speak.
19	6	"For Whom the Spell Holds"	October 25, 1986
Zummi finds and unlocks a section of the Great Book of Gummi that contains advanced magic spells. However, this also signals Zorlok, an evil wizard whom the Great Gummies had imprisoned in a subterranean prison centuries ago, that he can find the unlocking spell, be free to inflict violence on all Gummi Bears the whole world over, and then conquer the world. To do this, Zorlok creates a monster to steal the Great Book, causing Zummi, Grammi, and Gruffi to have to track it down.
20a	7a	"Little Bears Lost"	November 15, 1986
There is a thief in Gummi Glen, so Zummi and Grammi team up to find the rat. Unfortunately, Zummi casts the wrong spell and ends up shrinking them both to a diminutive size, and they only have a limited amount of time to reverse it before it becomes permanent. Title may be a reference to the 1953 Bing Crosby film Little Boy Lost.
20b	7b	"Guess Who's Gumming to Dinner?"	November 15, 1986
After an autumn of hard work and preparation for the upcoming winter, the Gummies are looking forward to the Gummi holiday of Fall's Farewell, a holiday intended for relaxation and doing absolutely no work for a day. However, Sunni goes so far overboard with the celebration while trying to impress Calla, the other Gummies plan their own celebration. Note: This is the third episode in which Calla appears without Cavin.
21	8	"My Gummi Lies Over the Ocean"	November 29, 1986
Tummi builds a full-sized boat, which Gruffi wants scuttled. However, out of respect for all the work done, he allows Tummi one sailing trip. This trip takes an unexpected turn when they end up on a volcanic island inhabited only by another Gummi Bear – an artist by the name of Gusto. However, the island is on the verge of collapse, and its volcano is within days of eruption. It is now a race against time for Gruffi, Tummi, and Gusto to escape the island before it is too late. Note: First appearance of Gusto Gummi. In addition, Sunni and Cubbi appear in this episode, but neither one speaks.

=== Season 3: 1987 ===
No. overall	No. in season	Title	Original release date
22a	1a	"Too Many Cooks"	September 12, 1987
Sir Paunch, a famous confectioner visits Dunwyn, to the great anticipation of everyone in the kingdom, even the Gummi Bears! However, to the sadness of Dunwyn, Sir Paunch announces his plans to retire. Tummi, Sunni, and Cubbi manage to get a hold of his secret recipe for the world-famous taffy, but their efforts to replicate the chef's favorite are not crowned with success. Not theirs, anyway. Note: Zummi, Grammi, and Gruffi do not appear in this episode. Only the three Gummi cubs are present. In addition, this is the fourth episode in which Calla appears without Cavin.
22b	1b	"Just a Tad Smarter"	September 12, 1987
Toadwart's smart and bossy cousin, Tadpole, arrives at Drekmore and initiates a coup d'état among his fellow ogres. Now the leader of Drekmore, Tadpole initiates a scorched earth policy against the Gummi Bears, who had annoyed him prior to the overthrow, by destroying the Gummiberry crops. Only one unlikely man can save the Gummiberries: the dethroned Igthorn! Note: Despite appearing throughout the episode, Zummi and Tummi do not speak. Neither Gummi's voice is even heard, save for a recycled voice clip of Paul Winchell laughing for Zummi at the very end of the episode (when the Gummies all share a laugh over Igthorn being back in charge and making things painful for the ogres all over again).
23a	2a	"If I Were You"	September 19, 1987
Igthorn tries to infiltrate Gummi Glen by magically switching places with Tummi while the bears plan Tummi's birthday surprise.
23b	2b	"Eye of the Beholder"	September 19, 1987
After a tiring lesson of horseback riding, Sunni witnesses an ugly witch named Marzipan banished from an adjacent kingdom at the Dunwyn border. After disposing of a kitchen ingredient that reveals her true self, the witch transforms herself into a beautiful lady who enchants all of Dunwyn, including Calla, who now does not want Sunni as a friend, and King Gregor, whom Marzipan intends to marry to steal his fortune. Sunni must work fast to find the substance that breaks the witch's enchantment. Note: Sunni is the only Gummi who appears in this episode. Zummi, Grammi, Gruffi, Tummi, and Cubbi are all absent, making this the first episode to only feature one of the Gummies. In addition, this is the fifth episode in which Calla appears without Cavin. Finally, Brian Cummings replaces Roger C. Carmel as the voice of Sir Tuxford due to the latter's sudden death in 1986. Special Note: After her defeat, Marzipan's threat to Calla and Sunni ("I'll get you, and your little pig, too!") is a reference to the Wicked Witch of the West, the main antagonist of The Wizard of Oz, who says a similar thing to protagonist Dorothy Gale: "I'll get you, my pretty, and your little dog, too!"
24a	3a	"Presto Gummo"	September 26, 1987
Tummi wants to learn magic like Zummi. A bored Cubbi uses stunts to fool Tummi into thinking that he is an actual magician. But when Igthorn captures Tummi, Cubbi must think of a way to free him. Such a way comes to fruition when Tummi proposes the idea of sleight of hand. Note: Grammi, Gruffi, and Sunni appear in this episode, but do not speak. In addition, this is Igthorn's second time drinking Gummiberry juice and gaining super strength from it.
24b	3b	"A Tree Grows in Dunwyn"	September 26, 1987
The trolls have escaped from the dungeon of Castle Dunwyn and are looking for stolen gold reserves. When they learn that the gold was stored in an apple tree meant as a gift for King Gregor, the trolls take the Gummi Glen Gummies as hostages. Note: This is Calla's fourth time drinking Gummiberry juice and gaining super strength from it. This is also the sixth episode in which she appears without Cavin.
25	4	"Day of the Beevilweevils"	October 3, 1987
Tummi builds what he thinks is a bee caller, but it instead attracts beevilweevils, insects that devour the Gummiberry bushes. Tummi and Gusto then go on a dangerous mission to locate a replacement Gummiberry sapling. When Zummi, Grammi, and Gruffi go on a rescue mission to find Tummi and Gusto, they encounter talking trees who want revenge on the Gummies for (inadvertently) deserting them during the Great Gummi Exodus. Note: Sunni appears in this episode, but she does not speak.
26a	5a	"Water Way to Go"	October 10, 1987
Sunni and Gusto meet a mermaid, Aquarianne, and her sea beast guardian, Finwithit. When Igthorn captures Aquarianne and uses Finwithit to attack Dunwyn, it's up to Sunni and Gusto to save her – and Dunwyn. Note: Zummi, Grammi, Gruffi, Tummi, and Cubbi do not appear in this episode, making this the second episode in which Sunni is the only one of the main six Gummies to appear in an episode (though this time, not the only Gummi, in general, with Gusto also in the episode). This is the first time in which Gusto is seen drinking Gummiberry juice and gaining the temporary bouncing abilities granted to Gummi Bears. This is also the first time in which his waterfall apartment is seen. Finally, he also meets Duke Igthorn for the first time.
26b	5b	"Close Encounters of the Gummi Kind"	October 10, 1987
When Gusto invents a decoy to lure ogres away from Gummi Glen, it fools the ogres. Unfortunately, it also attracts the humans, who start looking around the forest. It is up to Gruffi and Gusto to save the glen. Note: Sunni and Cubbi do not appear in this episode. In addition, this is the second consecutive time in which Gusto is seen drinking Gummiberry juice.
27a	6a	"Snows Your Old Man"	October 31, 1987
While trying to find out why winter is still persisting in Dunwyn alone, Tummi, Sunni, and Cubbi encounter a frost giant named Chillbeard, who uses a "wind horn" to freeze everything. The cubs wonder why Chillbeard seems immature for the "Lord of Winter," wanting to play games instead of allowing spring to start. Note: Zummi appears at the very beginning of this episode, but does not speak. Oddly, he disappears soon after his brief appearance (in what might be an animation error). In addition, it is revealed that Gusto lives in Gummi Glen with the other Gummies only during the winter (as the waterfall that he uses to get in and out of his apartment is more than likely frozen during this time). Finally, with this episode, he has appeared in four consecutive episodes (full-length and mini-length), his longest streak of episodes throughout the series.
27b	6b	"Boggling the Bears"	October 31, 1987
Sunni saves a squirrel-like shapeshifter called a boggle from a hungry wolf and takes it back home. But a shapeshifter – not to mention a whole family of them – tends to make a rather tedious pet! Note: Zummi and Cubbi appear in this episode, but neither one speaks. In addition, the wolf chasing the boggles and who later tries to eat Sunni closely resembles the hungry wolf who tried to eat Wart in The Sword in the Stone.
28	7	"The Knights of Gummadoon"	December 5, 1987
When the castle of the knights of Gummadoon (a reference to Brigadoon) appears, Cavin is imprisoned as a spy. The Gummies only have until sunset to rescue him, as the castle only appears once every hundred years, but they also have to contend with Duke Igthorn, who plans to capture the castle. Note: This is Cavin's only appearance in season three. This is also Duke Igthorn's third time drinking Gummiberry juice and gaining super strength. In addition, it is revealed that Gummiberry juice gives super strength to ogres who drink it in addition to humans.
29a	8a	"Mirthy Me"	December 12, 1987
A Gigglin causes a practical joke spree in the Glen. Will this stop the dam from being built in time to stop the water from flooding in? Note: The title of this episode is a play on the phrase "Mercy me." Special Note: The Gigglin bears a remarkable resemblance to Toadie. His voice actor even voices the Gigglin.
29b	8b	"Gummi Dearest"	December 12, 1987
After the egg of a griffin rolls free, Cubbi gets mistaken for the baby, whilst Gruffi has to deal with the actual baby griffin, who thinks that he is his father. Can Gruffi and Cubbi make the switch without facing the wrath of the mother griffin? Note: Zummi, Grammi, Tummi, and Sunni do not appear in this episode. Special Note: The title of this episode is a play on the movie titled Mommie Dearest.

=== Season 4: 1988 ===
No. overall	No. in season	Title	Original release date
30	1	"The Magnificent Seven Gummies"	September 10, 1988
An Asian prince takes the Gummies to Asia to help defend his kingdom against a dragon that is ravaging crops and disrupting people, but Duke Igthorn stows away and seeks to see if anything in the Asian kingdom can be used to attack Dunwyn. Note: The opening sequence once again updates, now including scenes from seasons three and four.
31a	2a	"Music Hath Charms"	September 17, 1988
Igthorn gets his hands on a set of magical bagpipes, which entrance anyone listening to its tunes. Unfortunately, this includes most of the Gummies. Fortunately, Grammi has gone temporarily deaf, and it's all up to her to foil Igthorn's scheme and rescue the other Gummies . . . and the people of Dunwyn. Note: Although Zummi technically speaks when he, Gruffi, Tummi, Sunni, and Cubbi all tell Grammi, in unison, that they serve Igthorn while under his (Igthorn's) spell, Paul Winchell does not provide his voice at any point in time in this episode. In addition, Cavin also appears in this episode, but he does not speak, making this his first voiceless, non-speaking appearance of the series. He is briefly seen walking among the people of Dunwyn after Igthorn entrances them, and again near the end, when the people are awakening from the spell.
31b	2b	"Dress for Success"	September 17, 1988
The Gummi Bears attend a masquerade festival, Folly Day, at Dunwyn, but so does Igthorn, with the intention to get rid of King Gregor once and for all, and the only tool Sunni has to stop him is her rather gaudy, self-made new dress. Note: Zummi appears in this episode, but he again does not speak.
32a	3a	"A Knight to Remember"	September 24, 1988
Cubbi wants to play knight, but when the Gummies don't believe him when he sees the ghost of a real Gummi Knight, he sets out to learn from him and help him fulfill an unfinished quest. Note: Zummi appears in this episode, but he once again does not speak.
32b	3b	"Gummies Just Want to Have Fun"	September 24, 1988
Grammi is visited by a childhood friend, a leprechaun named Nogum, who shows her how to have fun once again. But her chores don't get done, in the meantime. Will Nogum get Grammi to come away with him? Note: The title of the episode is a play on the song "Girls Just Wanna Have Fun" by pop singer Cyndi Lauper.
33a	4a	"There's No Place Like Home"	October 1, 1988
When the dilapidated state of Gummi Glen and an exploding Stinkweed Stew force the Gummies to temporarily evacuate their home, Sunni tries to find a good place in which she, Tummi, and Cubbi can stay. But their last choice, Dunwyn, proves no safer than the wilds, since rats are on the loose in the castle, along with an overeager exterminator. Note: This is the seventh episode in which Calla appears without Cavin.
33b	4b	"Color Me Gummi"	October 1, 1988
When King Gregor accidentally sees one of Gusto's lifelike paintings in Cavin's hands, Cavin panics and lies that he did the painting. King Gregor then commissions Cavin to create a portrait of him, forcing Gusto to help Cavin behind the scenes . . . without getting discovered. Note: Sunni appears in this episode, but does not speak. In addition, Cubbi does not appear in this episode. Also, this is the first episode to be centered on Gusto since his introduction. This is also the first episode in which he has appeared without his pet toucan, Artie. Finally, this is the third episode in which he is seen drinking Gummiberry juice.
34	5	"He Who Laughs Last"	October 15, 1988
Fed up with Gummi Bear stories by Sir Gawain, a retired knight and Cavin's grandfather, a jealous citizen of Dunwyn, Lord Willoughby, issues a challenge to him: find evidence of the Bears' existence, or give up his entire fortune. Cavin, of course, is torn between helping his grandfather and his vow keeping the secret of his friends. Meanwhile, Tummi is cursed after eating a dangerous fruit, and the other Gummies must find a spell to save him before he fully turns into a tree. Notes: Sir Gawain and Lord Willoughby both learn of the Gummi Bears' existence. Sir Gawain is sworn to secrecy by the Gummis, while Lord Willoughby is not believed by the public.
35a	6a	"Tummi's Last Stand"	October 29, 1988
When Tummi's big girth causes him and Cubbi to be almost captured by Igthorn and his ogres, Cubbi encourages Tummi to use an old Gummi training course to lose some weight. But the course turns out to be useful in other ways, as well. . . . Note: Zummi and Sunni appear only at the end of this episode, but neither one speaks.
35b	6b	"The Crimson Avenger Strikes Again"	October 29, 1988
Gruffi sees Cubbi in his Crimson Avenger costume and, thinking that he's just playing a "childish game," forces him to give it up by throwing it over a cliff. By happenstance, Toadie, who has again been cast out of Drekmore by Igthorn, takes up the mantle of the Crimson Avenger when the costume literally falls right into his lap – and at just the wrong time, too, as Igthorn is about to carry out his latest plan to kidnap Princess Calla! Note: Zummi, Grammi, Tummi, and Sunni all appear in this episode, but none of them speak. In addition, this is the eighth episode in which Calla appears without Cavin.
36a	7a	"Ogre Baby Boom"	November 12, 1988
An accidental mixture of Gummiberry juice and baby powder reduces Igthorn's ogre troops to infants, and Grammi takes in one of these babies to raise it for the better. Note: Zummi, Tummi, and Sunni do not appear in this episode.
36b	7b	"The White Knight"	November 12, 1988
Dunwyn's most famous paladin, Sir Victor, pays a visit to King Gregor's court. But the White Knight bears a secret that makes him an easy target for extortion by Igthorn. Notes: Tummi and Sunni appear in this episode, but neither one speaks. In addition, Igthorn's given name is revealed to be Sigmund.
37a	8a	"Good Neighbor Gummi"	December 3, 1988
When Gruffi breaks his foot, he stubbornly refuses to stay put, believing that the Glen would suffer if he doesn't remain active. His attitude doesn't improve when a rowdy bandit gang decides to make camp – right above Gummi Glen. Notes: Sunni appears in this episode, but she does not speak. Additionally, this is the second episode in which Gusto appears without Artie. Special Note: After failing in one of his plans to get rid of the bandits, Gruffi sticks a finger out of a pile of logs and says, "I have not yet begun to fight!" When he says this, he is quoting United States naval commander John Paul Jones.
37b	8b	"Girl's Knight Out"	December 3, 1988
King Gregor proposes a series of tests for Unwin and the other squires to become princess Calla's bodyguard, which includes stealing a golden apple from the strong and mysterious Black Knight. Calla conceals her appearance in a suit of armor and competes, as well, to prove that she is capable of her own self defense. Notes: Zummi, Grammi, Gruffi, Tummi, and Cubbi do not appear in this episode, making this the third episode in which Sunni is the only one of the main six Gummies to appear (and the second overall in which she is the only Gummi to appear at all, as Gusto also does not appear in this episode). Additionally, this is also the ninth episode in which Calla appears without Cavin. Finally, this episode marks the final appearance of Unwin. It is likely that he was removed from the series due to his unpopularity with the fans.
38	9	"Top Gum"	December 10, 1988
Inspired by some old stories, Cubbi constructs a flight pack and races off into the clouds to find the legendary Aerials. Unfortunately, the Aerials are not like the old Gummi stories described . . . in more than one way. Note: This episode marks the first time in which Gusto is ever kidnapped by a villain (or, in this case, a group of villains), whereas Zummi, Grammi, Gruffi, Tummi, Sunni, and Cubbi have all been kidnapped several times by this point. Special Note: The title of this episode is an obvious play on the movie Top Gun.
39	10	"Gummies At Sea"	December 17, 1988
Tummi finds a Gummarine, an ancient seagoing vessel that can take the Gummies to New Gumbria, where they can meet other Gummies. However, their plans are quickly derailed when Duke Igthorn captures the ship and uses it to attack King Gregor.

=== Season 5: 1989–90 ===
No. overall	No. in season	Title	Original release date
40a	1a	"A Gummi a Day Keeps the Doctor Away"	September 9, 1989
Tummi takes pity on Doctor Dexter, an unsuccessful pharmacist, and decides to improve his concoctions with a shot of Gummiberry juice. Unfortunately, this new wonder medicine also attracts the attention of Igthorn, and without the knowledge of how to exactly replicate the formula, Dexter is caught between a rock and a hard place. Note: Zummi, Grammi, Sunni, and Cubbi do not appear in this episode. In addition, Doctor Dexter meets and learns about the Gummi Bears' existence. It can likely be presumed that he took the same oath as Cavin, Calla, and Sir Gawain to keep their existence a secret off-screen.
40b	1b	"Let Sleeping Giants Lie"	September 9, 1989
The first snow of winter has arrived, which means that the annual Festival of the First Snow has come to Gummi Glen. An old Gummi ritual associated with the festival proves more important than Sunni and Cubbi could have imagined. Their negligence and carelessness allow a giant to wake from his age-long slumber, and he quickly proceeds to wreak havoc all over Dunwyn. It is up to Sunni and Cubbi to put him back to sleep and save the kingdom.
41	2	"The Road to Ursalia"	September 16, 1989
Gruffi destroys the Great Book of Gummi by accident and reluctantly travels with Cubbi to the lost Gummi city of Ursalia to find a replacement. But despite the fact that the Gummies departed centuries ago, the ruins of Ursalia are still inhabited –- by the brave, but scatterbrained, Gummi Knight Sir Thornberry, the evil witch Lady Bane, and her jackal-like flunkies, the Troggles. Note: First appearances of Sir Thornberry, Lady Bane, and the Troggles. This is also the first visit to Ursalia for Gruffi and Cubbi.
42a	3a	"Bridge on the River Gummi"	September 23, 1989
When an old bridge that Grammi and Sunni use for errands collapses, Gusto convinces Gruffi to build a bigger, more elaborate bridge. However, Igthorn takes advantage of the new bridge to transport a new weapon to Dunwyn.
42b	3b	"Life of the Party"	September 30, 1989
The lovestruck Igthorn invites Lady Bane to Drekmore to discuss an alliance (and perhaps more). However, the ogres get their hands on a rare tree that the Gummies need and use it for a table decoration, and Sunni and Cubbi are forced to play party crashers to get it back. Notes: Grammi and Tummi do not appear in this episode. In addition, Sunni and Duke Igthorn meet Lady Bane for the first time, and the latter falls in love with her. The feelings seem to be mutual from Lady Bane until their meeting goes incredibly wrong.
43a	4a	"My Kingdom for a Pie"	October 7, 1989
Tummi's overeating becomes his Achilles heel and could put his friends in grave danger when Duke Igthorn learns this and has his ogres prepare an elaborate feast with many sumptuous courses, all for Tummi -- if he only tells him the location of Gummi Glen. Note: Zummi, Sunni, and Cubbi only appear at the end of this episode, but none of them speak.
43b	4b	"The World According to Gusto"	October 21, 1989
When Gusto says that the only rule a Gummi needs to know is that there are no rules, Grammi suggests that Cubbi live with him to see how true that really is. When Cubbi does so, both he and Gusto learn a valuable lesson about following the rules. Note: Zummi, Tummi, and Sunni appear only at the end of the episode, but none of them speak.
44	5	"Ogre for a Day"	November 4, 1989
Zummi discovers a Gummi transformation spell. The spell has never been used on humans, but Zummi reluctantly uses it on Cavin, who takes the guise of an ogre and infiltrates the ranks of Castle Drekmore to uncover Duke Igthorn's latest plot. But his new form makes communicating his good intentions to the right people a little difficult. Note: Tummi and Sunni appear in this episode, but neither one speaks. In addition, there is an error made in the episode. When Cavin drinks the Gummiberry juice at the climax of the episode, he gains the Gummi bouncing ability rather than the superhuman strength that is supposed to be granted to humans. It was likely a writer error.
45a	6a	"Princess Problems"	November 11, 1989
King Gregor hosts King Jean-Claude, a ruler of a nearby Frankish kingdom, and his daughter, Marie, to improve diplomatic relations. But both Sunni and Calla learn that being a princess does not make one an instant sweet little girl. Even worse, Marie's haughty attitude eventually causes King Jean-Claude to stage a military siege on Dunwyn. Notes: Zummi, Tummi, and Cubbi do not appear in this episode. Cavin appears briefly, but does not speak, marking his second non-speaking appearance. This episode marks the first appearance of King Jean-Claude and Princess Marie, with the latter debuting as a minor villain. This episode is where the girls Calla and Marie are rivals for the first time.
45b	6b	"A Gummi is a Gummi's Best Friend"	November 18, 1989
Gusto creates a lifelike stone statue of Zummi, then persuades Zummi to come to his workshop so he can create a better one. Meanwhile, Gruffi mistakes the statue for his friend, believing that Zummi has accidentally turned himself into stone -– and so does Lady Bane. Notes: Tummi, Sunni, and Cubbi appear at the end of this episode, but none of them speak. In addition, this is the last appearance of Gusto until "King Igthorn" in season six.
46	7	"Beg, Burrow, and Steal"	December 9, 1989
The trolls are on the loose again, and this time, they've hijacked an ancient Gummi digging machine. Note: This is the tenth episode in which Calla appears without Cavin.
47	8	"Return to Ursalia"	December 16, 1989
A message by Sir Thornberry lures both the Gummies and Igthorn back to Ursalia, where a new band of Gummies, the Barbics, have taken refuge. However, the new tenants are mostly quite an unsociable bunch with a deep hatred for all humans. They seek the ultimate weapon in Ursalia to get revenge against the humans, and as it so happens, this weapon is close to falling into Igthorn's hands. Note: Zummi, Grammi, Tummi, and Sunni visit Ursalia for the first time. Additionally, this is the first appearance of the Barbics.
48a	9a	"Never Give a Gummi an Even Break"	January 6, 1990
Grammi finds what seems to be a Gummi forced to work as a side show and takes him home to Gummi Glen, but Gruffi thinks there is something wrong with him. Are Gruffi's suspicions correct, or have they found another Gummi Bear? Notes: Despite appearing throughout the episode, Tummi does not speak. Although his mouth is seen moving with the other Gummies while they are being forced to sing, Lorenzo Music does not provide a voice for him. In addition, this is the final episode in which Zummi is voiced by Paul Winchell prior to his retirement.

=== Season 6: 1990–91 ===
No. overall	No. in season	Title	Original release date
49	1	"A Gummi's Work is Never Done"	September 10, 1990
Grammi and Gruffi decide to trade their usual chores to find out who has the easier job. Meanwhile, Toadie and Igthorn discover blueprints for an ancient Gummi Bear logging machine, but needs a Gummi to build it for him, leading to another hunt for the bears.
48b	2b	"Friar Tum"	September 12, 1990
Lured by the aroma of their daily baking, Tummi ends up in the company of human monks, is forced to protect the faithful friars from the thieving trolls, and finally learns to say no for his own good. Note: Cubbi does not appear in this episode, though he is mentioned by Zummi at the end of the episode. In addition, Jim Cummings replaces Paul Winchell as the voice of Zummi Gummi. Special Notes: The abbott of the monastery that Tummi accidentally joins is named Abbott Costello. This is no doubt an homage to the comedy duo Abbott and Costello. Also, the troll named Tuck is called "Friar Tuck" by his boss, Clutch. This is an homage to Robin Hood's religious friend.
50	3	"Tuxford's Turnaround"	September 18, 1990
Tummi and Cubbi witness a delegation of knights arriving for a great tournament. Sir Tuxford appears to be no match for his younger peers, so Cavin asks Tummi and Cubbi to lend a helping hand. But Igthorn using the tournament as a diversion to take over Dunwyn and a broken secret Gummi door make things much more complicated than necessary. Note: Zummi, Grammi, and Sunni do not appear in this episode. In addition, this is the first and only episode to focus on Sir Tuxford. Finally, this is Jason Marsden's last episode voicing Cavin. He had the longest tenure of voicing the character at a little over two seasons. R. J. Williams of Kissyfur fame would later take over the role a few episodes later, in "Thornberry to the Rescue."
51	4	"Toadie the Conqueror"	September 19, 1990
Igthorn comes into the possession of an invincible magical suit armor of an infamous villain from the past. Unfortunately, this armor fits the diminutive Toadie only, and once the dwarfish ogre realizes its power, he simply decides to take his Dukie's place as the ruler of Dunwyn. It is now up to Zummi, Sunni, and Cubbi to defeat the small ogre, before Dunwyn ends up under the permanent control of King Toadie! Note: Tummi appears in this episode, but does not speak. In addition, this is the eleventh episode in which Calla appears without Cavin.
52a	5a	"Zummi in Slumberland"	September 25, 1990
Zummi has become so burnt out on remembering his magic spells lately, he starts casting them in his sleep. This leads to problems for the other Gummies, including a very dangerous one involving one of their Gummi peppers. . . .
53	6	"Patchwork Gummi"	September 26, 1990
Sunni finds an old, enchanted Gummi quilt that records the old Gummies' greatest achievements on its patches. In her eagerness to show it to Calla, she accidentally loses the quilt to Lady Bane, who promptly employs its magic to try to make herself the Queen of Dunwyn. Notes: Zummi, Sunni, Calla, King Gregor, and Sir Tuxford all meet Lady Bane for the first time, and Zummi, Sunni, and Calla also meet the Troggles. In addition, this is the twelfth episode in which Calla appears without Cavin.
54	7	"Thornberry to the Rescue"	October 19, 1990
In his clumsiness, a visiting Sir Thornberry inadvertently releases the Spinster, an old, spiderlike menace of the Gummi Bears from centuries ago. When this results in Zummi, Grammi, Gruffi, Tummi, Sunni, and Cubbi all being kidnapped by her, he and Cavin become the Gummies' best hope of escaping this evil monster before she makes dinner out of them. Note: This is R. J. Williams's first episode voicing Cavin. He would be the final voice actor for the character, voicing him until the end of the series. Special Note: As a result of Sir Thornberry making himself at home in Gummi-Glen off-screen, Gruffi says that someone has been sitting in his chair, Grammi says that someone has been eating her porridge, and Cubbi says that someone has been sleeping in his bed. Cavin states that the situation sounds familiar. Though he does not realize it, he is, of course, referring to Goldilocks and the Three Bears.
55	8	"Once More, the Crimson Avenger"	November 5, 1990
Cubbi almost gives up being the Crimson Avenger after a string of humiliating defeats, but is re-inspired by a young boy named Milton's faith in his alter-ego. He will need that faith, as he is forced to take on a new villain, the Grand Fromage (the Big Cheese), who is stealing various ingredients from around Dunwyn. Notes: Zummi and Tummi do not appear in this episode. In addition, with this being Cubbi's last stint as the Crimson Avenger, none of the other Gummies other than Tummi ever find out his identity over the course of the series.
52b	5b	"A Recipe for Trouble"	November 6, 1990
Grammi tries to become a better cook and collects a number of strange roots for seasoning. Unfortunately, a trio of gnomes needs these roots to appease an ever-hungry, bullying slug-like monster called the Slugger, and they believe that the Gummies stole the roots. Out of revenge, they kidnap Zummi, Gruffi, Tummi, and Sunni to feed to the monster, which makes Grammi decide to give him a taste of her homemade cooking instead.
56	9	"Queen of the Carpies"	November 15, 1990
The bullying king of the Carpies loses his crown, which ends up in Sunni's hands – and the other Carpies promptly assume that she has defeated their king. Thus, they take poor Sunni once again to Carpy Mountain, this time to rule as a queen, while the other Gummies must treat the accidentally-deposed Carpy King, who was injured by Tummi. Note: This is the second time that Sunni has been kidnapped by Carpies, the first time being in "A Gummi in a Gilded Cage." Finally, this is the thirteenth episode in which Calla appears without Cavin. Special Note: The Carpy Bobo, who becomes king at the end of this episode, has personality traits, mannerisms, and speech patterns based on the Looney Tunes character Beaky Buzzard. He even says things similar to the character.
57	10	"True Gritty"	November 19, 1990
Cubbi accidentally wrecks Ursalia's water reservoir, leaving the ancient metropolis short of its most important commodity. While Gruffi, Ursa, and Sir Thornberry keep bickering whilst following an ancient aqueduct to find out why the water flow has stopped, Gritty and Cubbi try to lasso and train a few ramas (an amalgam of ram and llama) to fetch water from the not-so-nearest river. But then, Gritty tries to get revenge on a group of mountain shepherds for human crimes against the ancient Gummi Bears, and Cubbi has a hard time trying to persuade him otherwise. Note: Zummi, Grammi, Tummi, and Sunni do not appear in this episode. Special Note: The title of this episode is a play on the phrase "true grit."
58	11	"King Igthorn: Part I"	November 27, 1990
With no sign of Igthorn for an entire year, not even in his own castle, Zummi finds this news as a perfect opportunity to call on the Great Gummies (much to the skepticism of Gruffi). However, Igthorn has been absent for the past year because he has actually devised the ultimate plan to finally capture the Gummies, obtain the Gummiberry juice, and take over Dunwyn once and for all. Note: First appearance of Gusto this season. His only other appearance is in "Rocking Chair Bear."
59	12	"King Igthorn: Part II"	November 28, 1990
Igthorn and his ogres have destroyed Gummi Glen, captured Dunwyn Kingdom and its citizens, and are keeping Grammi and Tummi held in Drekmore. Now Cavin and the remaining Gummies, with the help of the Barbics, must save them all while Zummi retrieves the Great Book and warn the Great Gummies to turn back. Everything culminates in one final showdown, pitting the Gummies against their long-time foe, Igthorn, to determine the ultimate fate of Dunwyn. Note: This is the last episode produced for the show (and thus the true series finale), but not the last one aired. In this final episode, Gusto finally meets the Barbics, Igthorn is defeated for good, and Drekmore Castle is destroyed, leaving him with no ogres other than Toadie. In addition, the main Gummies move from the destroyed Gummi Glen to Ursalia. However, on the downside, with this final episode, no humans ever learn of the Gummies' existence (other than the few who did learn of them over the course of the series), which turned out to be a disappointing factor with many fans.
60	13	"Tummi Trouble"	February 14, 1991
Igthorn purchases a love potion from a traveling gypsy to get Lady Bane to fall in love with him. But a severe accident instead makes Lady Bane fall in love with Toadie . . . and Tummi in love with Lady Bane! Note: Zummi and Cubbi only appear at the end of this episode, but neither one speaks. In addition, Grammi and Tummi meet Lady Bane and the Troggles for their first and only time.
61	14	"Rocking Chair Bear"	February 18, 1991
When Lady Bane gets a lock of Sunni's hair, she uses it as part of a spell to keep her eternally young. Unfortunately, the spell also has an inverse effect on Sunni, aging her from a young Gummi to an old one. Now Zummi, Gruffi, and Gusto must get Sunni's hair back to reverse the spell . . . before Sunni dies of old age decades too soon! Notes: This episode marks the final appearance of Lady Bane and the Troggles. In addition, this is the fourth time in which Gusto is seen drinking Gummiberry juice and gaining the bouncing abilities granted to Gummies. He also meets Lady Bane and the Troggles for his first and only time.
62	15	"Trading Faces"	February 19, 1991
While thwarting yet one more attempt of Igthorn to claim rulership, Sir Tuxford is injured, so Sir Victor is called in to defend Dunwyn for the period of Tuxford's recovery. However, soon Igthorn hits upon a plan to use his likeness to his twin brother to conquer Dunwyn, after all. Note: Tummi and Sunni appear briefly in this episode, but neither one speaks.
63	16	"May the Best Princess Win"	February 20, 1991
King Gregor and Calla travel to the realm of King Jean-Claude and his daughter Marie to discuss an alliance against a fiendish villain, Marquis de Bouillabaisse, and Sunni is accidentally forced to follow along, while Tummi and Cubbi follow to get her home before Gruffi finds out that any of them are gone. Once more, the girls engage in a competitive quarrel, which leads them right into the arms of Bouillabaisse. Now the girls must work together to escape and defeat the villain, with help from the Gummies, before he can use them against their fathers. Note: Zummi and Grammi appear briefly at the beginning of this episode, but neither one speaks. In addition, this is the second and final appearance of King Jean-Claude and Princess Marie, the latter of whom reforms from her prior behavior in "Princess Problems" and becomes a heroine and good friend of Calla's. She also learns of the Gummies' existence and, like Cavin, Calla, Sir Gawain, and Doctor Dexter before her, vows to keep their existence a secret. Finally, this is the fourteenth and final episode in which Calla appears without Cavin. Special Note: Bouillabaisse is likely based on French conqueror Napoleon Bonaparte, what with his short stature and tyrannical nature.
64	17	"Wings Over Dunwyn"	February 21, 1991
Grammi and Tummi go to feed a flock of giant birds just returning from their winter quarters, only to be forced to protect them from Igthorn, who is hunting these birds to use them as war steeds, and take care of one of their young at the same time!
65	18	"The Rite Stuff"	February 22, 1991
Eager to meet the Barbics, Cavin accompanies Gruffi, Tummi, and Cubbi on a trip to Ursalia. He is at first not welcomed by the Barbics, but soon gets the chance to prove himself in a manhood ritual which Buddy has to undergo to become a full member of his tribe. However, a pair of satyr poachers are on the prowl, looking for furs to line their purses –- and Gruffi, Ursa, Buddy, and Sir Thornberry just so happen to be quite hairy. . . . Note: Zummi, Grammi, and Sunni do not appear in this episode.
