= Mathematics Anxiety Rating Scale =

Rating scale for assessing math anxiety

The Mathematics Anxiety Rating Scale (MARS) is a rating scale used to diagnose mathematical anxiety and test the effectiveness of different math anxiety treatment approaches. It is available in several different lengths, and for different age groups. MARS and its subtest R-MARS are considered to be the educational standard for measuring math anxiety.

== Original scale ==
The original Mathematics Anxiety Rating Scale was introduced in 1972 by Frank Richardson and Richard Suinn. It focuses on identifying anxiety surrounding the manipulation of numbers, and use of mathematical concepts. Its original intended use was for treatment and research of math anxiety, development of an anxiety hierarchy in desensitization treatments.

The MARS is rating scale composed of brief descriptions of situations that might lead to different levels of anxiety in clients. Clients are asked to rate the situations on a likert-scale of 1 to 5. Answers of 1 represent a client might feel "not at all anxious" while a 5 indicates a feeling of "very much" anxious. There are 98-items in total, with diverse kinds of situations included. The range of questions allows the rating scale to be used in a wide variety of clients, students and non-students alike.

A total math anxiety score is found by adding together the values of each answer in the rating scale. A high score value represents high levels of math anxiety.

The MARS identifies six distinct factors of math anxiety: General Evaluation Anxiety, Everyday Numerical Anxiety, Passive Observation Anxiety, Performance Anxiety, Mathematics-Test Anxiety, and Problem Solving Anxiety.

General Evaluation Anxiety

General Evaluation Anxiety on the MARS revolves around apprehension over the completion of math related tasks. These include explicit references to taking math assessments and completing homework, along with reading math textbooks, preparing for assessments, and listening to lectures. This reflects evaluation in its most broad form, and may include skills not specific to math.

Everyday Numerical Anxiety

Everyday Numerical Anxiety speaks to an experience of math anxiety caused by performing basic arithmetic to execute daily financial affairs (ex: budgeting).

Passive Observation Anxiety

Passive Observation Anxiety is associated with watching, waiting, and listening while others act. These kind of conditions can support feelings of distance from a particular learning task, which then heightens the feelings of anxiety.

Performance Anxiety

Performance Anxiety is concerned with being observed by others while performing basic arithmetic.

Mathematics-Test Anxiety

Mathematics-Test Anxiety references anxiety specifically around mathematics assessments.

Problem Solving Anxiety

Problem Solving Anxiety deals with anxiety around several types of problem solving contexts and processes (ie: Algebra, Fractions, etc).

The overlapping nature of these factors strengthen the idea that math anxiety is a multi-dimensional issue.

== Psychometric data ==
In their initial publications, Richardson and Suinn presented the normative data, including a mean score of 215.38 with a standard deviation of 65.29, collected from 397 college students at a large state university in Missouri.

For test-retest reliability, the Pearson product-moment correlation coefficient was used and a score of 0.85 was calculated. This is comparable to scores found on other contemporary anxiety tests. In terms of internal reliability, an internal consistency reliability coefficient was .97, which indicates the test itself is highly reliable and dominated by one homogenous factor. Several different studies were used to support the validity of the tool.

The Differential Aptitude Test, a 10-minute math test including simple to complex problems. Calculation between the MARS test and Differential Aptitude Test scores was −0.64 (p < .01), indicating that higher MARS scores relate to lower math test scores. Since high anxiety interferes with performance, and poor performance produces anxiety, this result provides evidence that the MARS does measure mathematics anxiety.

== Revised Mathematics Anxiety Rating Scale (R-MARS) ==
In 1989, an abbreviated version of the Math Anxiety Rating Scale was developed by Alexander Livingston and Carl Martray. The R-MARS reduces the original MARS down to 25 questions, while maintaining internal consistency. The R-MARS measures the amount of mathematics anxiety students typically experience. There are three sub-scales the assessment measures: Mathematics Test Anxiety, Numerical Task Anxiety, and Mathematics Course Anxiety.

== Mathematics Anxiety Rating Scale - Elementary Form (MARS-E) ==
In 1988, the 26 item Suinn Mathematics Anxiety Rating Scale, Elementary Form (MARS-E) was released. Like the MARS, the test is designed to assess the degree of anxiety testers may experience in given math situations. The test was designed for children from ages 10 through adolescence, rather than the adult populations the MARS was designed for. The MARS-E deals with two factors: mathematics test anxiety and mathematics performance evaluation anxiety.
