= James B. Arthur =

American politician

- Born: February 9, 1831
- Died: August 11, 1905 (aged 74)
- Occupation: Politician

James Booth Arthur (February 9, 1831 – August 11, 1905) was a prominent figure in the early founding of Fort Collins, Colorado and Northern Colorado.

His hay-baling technique made horse and cattle feeding more efficient, an integral part of life in the latter 19th century. Arthur had other endeavors too, from his activity in government as Fort Collins' Mayor, County Commissioner, State of Colorado Senator to his active membership of the Episcopalian Church, executive in a local bank, entrepreneur in both irrigation and brick and plaster businesses.

When the Arthur family retired from cattle ranching and moved to the city, they built one of the most awaited homes of the time. It was constructed by Denver architects, Nichols and Canmann, and builder, Richard Burke, using the finest materials and techniques.

== Death and legacy ==
Arthur died on August 11, 1905, aged 74. He is buried at Grandview Cemetery, Fort Collins. The James Arthur House is one of the historic mansions still standing in Fort Collins, Colorado.

== See also ==
- List of mayors of Fort Collins, Colorado
