= Richard Suinn =

American psychologist

- Born: May 8, 1933; Honolulu, Hawaii, U.S.
- Died: January 5, 2024 (aged 90); Fort Collins, Colorado, U.S.
- Known for: Past president, American Psychological Association; former mayor, Fort Collins, Colorado
- Scientific career
- Fields: Psychology

Richard M. Suinn (May 8, 1933 – January 5, 2024) was an American psychologist who was a president of the American Psychological Association (APA) and a mayor of Fort Collins, Colorado.

== Life and career ==
Suinn earned an undergraduate degree from Ohio State University and a PhD in counseling psychology from Stanford University. He served on the city council of Fort Collins, Colorado, then he became the city's mayor. He was APA president in 1999. He was the first Asian-American president of the APA. Suinn was also one of the founding members of the Asian American Psychological Association.

After obtaining his degree, Suinn became a professor and taught Psychology. His first position was in Washington at Whitman College, followed by Stanford University Medical School. Then he returned to Hawaii to teach at the University of Hawaii, where he implemented the state's first doctoral program for psychology in the state of Hawaii. His final teaching position was in Fort Collins, Colorado, at Colorado State University (CSU).

While attending Stanford, Suinn helped with the implementation of the Stanford Ohwaki-Kohs Tactile Block Design Intelligence Test for the Blind (Ohwaki-Kohs Test), which was designed in Japan for help in administering the WAIS in specific regard to the Block Design subtest. Suinn helped design a study that tested the reliability and validity of implementing the Ohwaki-Kohs test in the United States on children in California. The design was to take the blocks that are usually used by determining differences in color (red and white) and replacing the smooth surface with two different textures, which would allow the blind students to feel the differences since they were not able to see them.

In 1972, during his time at CSU, Suinn was elected as the department head of the Counseling Psychology Program, and despite feeling nervous about his ability to perform effectively, Suinn held the position for the next 20 years. He spent his time as department head developing a program that led to more acceptance of graduate students of color. There was also an emphasis on hiring practices, which were more inclusive for women.

Not only did Suinn become department head of CSU Psychology in 1972, but he also became the first psychologist to work in the Olympics for the United States sports team. He would continue to work with several other teams in the Olympics over the years, and his time doing so would encourage the development of sports psychology.

In 1958, before he obtained his PhD, Suinn married his wife, Grace Toy, with whom he had four children. When he moved to CSU, his children were enrolled in public school in Fort Collins. Wanting to remain involved in his children's lives, Suinn ran for election to join the school board. While he lost the election, his ability to defend his position and his ideas intrigued other parents, who encouraged him to run for city council.

Still feeling unsure about himself, Suinn denied his ability to do so. It would take three attempts from others before he agreed to run. This is a common practice in Asian countries such as China, Japan, and Korea, where an individual is expected to deny acceptance to avoid being prideful, causing offence, or to gauge sincerity, as a person is not being sincere unless they are willing to attempt three times.

When he finally ran, he was elected in. After a few years of serving on the city council, he was elected mayor of Fort Collins. As mayor, Suinn oversaw the development of a new performing arts center, improvements to downtown architecture of Fort Collins, and the expansion of the town's library. All of this was done in the year he was mayor (1978-1979).

Richard Suinn emphasized sports psychology and its impact. He wrote about psychological training and exercises athletes should engage in to strengthen their mental skills. These exercises included ways to improve: self-management, self-regulation, visualization, goal setting, concentration, focus, and relaxation. The theory of sports psychology focuses heavily on motivation and goals. He felt visualizations should be positive and that burnout was more likely to occur when athletes began to view their failures. The ideas were primarily based on cognitive behavioral therapy (CBT), as he felt the practice worked best in helping to manage and maintain stress levels (Epstein, 1999). When interviewed, he explained most of his views about his role in the Olympics. Suinn was the first psychologist to be invited to join the American Olympic medical team and would continue to do so for five other teams throughout the years.

Suinn also focused his career on improvements for minorities, particularly Asian minorities. The Asian American Psychological Association (AAPA) was formed in 1972 in the San Francisco Bay Area by a group of Asian American Psychologists and mental health professionals who wanted to provide support for those trying to enter the field, encourage mental health improvements for Asian Americans, and promote research for Asian Americans. Richard Suinn was invited and accepted the invitation to help formulate and establish this organization.

Suinn's work on improvements did not stop at the organization of the AAPA; he published articles that focused on improvements for the accessibility of graduate programs for people of color, and in 1977, he served on the National Institutes of Mental Health (NIMH) Center for Minority Studies Committee. During his time there, he affirmed the competence of people of color and the importance in collaboration with different viewpoints.

During his career, Suinn also served several different organizations and was a member of the board for the American Psychological Foundation (APF), American Psychological Association (APA), American Board of Professional Psychology (ABPP), Association for the Advancement of Behavior Therapy (AABT), Association for the Advancement of Psychology (AAP), and Asian American Psychological Association (AAPA). For the APA specifically, Suinn was dedicated to serving in several subsections: the Board of Ethnic Minority Affairs, the Board of Convention Affairs, the Education and Training Board, and the Membership Board. In addition, he also served on the Publication and Communications Board and the Policy and Planning Board.

In appreciation for his efforts, the 45th Division of the APA put Suinn up for election as the president of the APA. After three failed elections, Richard Suinn became the 108th president of the APA in 1999. This made him the 1st Asian American to hold the position, and the third person of color to obtain the role. For his achievement, Suinn wrote about the efforts of promoting people of color and the responsibility he felt in ensuring that with his successes, he would pave the way to make it easier for those who came after to obtain the same. He promised to focus on minorities and the problems inherent in discrimination (Suinn, 1999). Following his declaration, Suinn helped establish two additional committees to the APA: the APA Commission on Ethnic Minority Recruitment, Retention and Training, and the Task Force on Enhancing Diversity in APA.

The Suinn-Lew Self Identity Acculturation scale (SL-ASIA) was a test that Suinn developed to help identify the acculturation of Asian Americans across all ages. This test was supposed to help identify clients struggling with identity or adaptation to a new culture. It is still in use today and is one of the most commonly used tests for the acculturation scale.

While minorities and the betterment of equality in psychology were significant aspects of Suinn's work, he had other interests, which included work with CBT theories with a particular focus on stress management and dealing with anxiety. In a study he conducted at the University of Hawaii, he focused on the idea that desensitization would be beneficial, and he sought to understand if group therapy could be as effective as individual therapy. As he later explained, the treatments were as effective as individual sessions and could accomplish the desired results in less time. The only loss in this study was the spider's unfortunate passing, Maude, at the end of desensitization for a group with a phobia of spiders.

Suinn's research into anxiety led to the development of his test, the Mathematics Anxiety Rating Scale, in 1972, which identifies the level of anxiety a student feels for math specifically, otherwise known as mathematical anxiety. This test has three categories: grades 4-6, 7-12, and college and adults.

In his lifetime, Suinn obtained multiple awards the list includes: Honorary Doctorate of Humane Letters, Raymond D Fowler Ward, Lifetime Contribution to Minority Issues Award, Lifetime Contribution to the Advancement of Behavior Therapy Award, APA Gold Medal Award for Life Achievement in Psychology in the Public Interest, and the APA later established the Suinn Minority Achievement Award which could be granted to educational institutions which promoted programs for people of color and advocated for minority inclusion and collaboration. To achieve the Suinn Award, the students must nominate a school.

Suinn died in Fort Collins on January 5, 2024, at the age of 90.

== See also ==
- List of mayors of Fort Collins, Colorado
