= Mathematical anxiety =

Anxiety towards math

Mathematical anxiety, also known as math phobia and math anxiety, is a feeling of tension and anxiety that interferes with the manipulation of numbers and the solving of mathematical problems in daily life and academic situations. It is a phenomenon that is often considered when examining students' problems in mathematics. Mathematical anxiety is often linked to testing anxiety, and can cause overall distress, along with dislike and avoidance of math-related tasks.

== History ==
The academic study of math anxiety originates as early as the 1950s, when Mary Fides Gough introduced the term mathemaphobia to describe the phobia-like feelings of many towards mathematics.The first math anxiety measurement scale was developed in 1972.

== Identification & Rating Scales ==
Frank Richardson and Richard Suinn introduced the Mathematics Anxiety Rating Scale (MARS) in 1972. Elevated scores on the MARS translate to high math anxiety. Other tests are often given to measure different dimensions of math anxiety, such as Elizabeth Fennema and Julia Sherman's Fennema-Sherman Mathematics Attitudes Scales (FSMAS). Despite the introduction of newer instrumentation, the use of the MARS test appears to be the educational standard for measuring math anxiety due to its specificity and prolific use.

== Impact on performance ==
Math anxiety manifests itself in a variety of ways, including physical, psychological, and behavioral symptoms, that can all disrupt a student's mathematical performance. An individual with math anxiety does not necessarily lack ability in mathematics. Rather, they cannot perform to their full potential due to the interfering symptoms of their anxiety.

The strong negative correlation between high math anxiety and low achievement is often thought to be due to the impact of math anxiety on working memory. Working memory has a limited capacity. A large portion of this capacity is dedicated to problem-solving when solving mathematical tasks. However, in individuals with math anxiety, much of this space is taken up by anxious thoughts, thus compromising the individual's ability to perform.

Schools’ frequent reliance on high-stakes and timed testing, where students tend to feel the most anxiety, can also lead to lower achievement for math-anxious individuals. Students experiencing high math anxiety demonstrate mathematics scores that are 34 points lower than students who do not have math anxiety, equivalent to one full year of school. Moreover, the influence of mathematical anxiety on performance increases over time, due to the accumulation of inadequate experience as children grow up.

== Math anxiety ==
Mark H. Ashcraft defines math anxiety as "a feeling of tension, apprehension, or fear that interferes with math performance" (2002, p. 1). It is a phenomenon that is often considered when examining students' problems in mathematics. According to the American Psychological Association, mathematical anxiety is often linked to testing anxiety. This anxiety can cause distress and likely causes a dislike and avoidance of all math-related tasks. Since this development, several researchers have looked at math anxiety in empirical studies. Hembree (1990) conducted a meta-analysis of 151 studies concerning math anxiety. The study determined that math anxiety is related to poor math performance on math achievement tests and to negative attitudes concerning math. Hembree also suggests that math anxiety is directly connected with math avoidance.

In contrast, a study by the University of Cambridge found that 77% of children with high maths anxiety were normal to high achievers on curriculum maths tests. Maths Anxiety has also been linked to perfectionism.

Ashcraft (2002) suggests that highly anxious math students will avoid situations in which they have to perform mathematical tasks. Unfortunately, math avoidance results in less competency, exposure and math practice, leaving students more anxious and mathematically unprepared to achieve. In college and university, anxious math students take fewer math courses and tend to feel negative toward the subject. In fact, Ashcraft found that the correlation between math anxiety and variables such as self-confidence and motivation in math is strongly negative.

According to Schar, because math anxiety can cause math avoidance, an empirical dilemma arises. For instance, when a highly math-anxious student performs disappointingly on a math question, it could be due to math anxiety or the lack of competency in math because of math avoidance. Ashcraft determined that by administering a test that becomes increasingly more mathematically challenging, he noticed that even highly math-anxious individuals do well on the first portion of the test measuring performance. However, on the latter and more difficult portion of the test, there was a stronger negative relationship between accuracy and math anxiety.

According to the research found at the University of Chicago by Sian Beilock and her group, math anxiety is not simply about being bad at math. After using brain scans, scholars confirmed that the anticipation or the thought of solving math actually causes math anxiety. The brain scans showed that the area of the brain that is triggered when someone has math anxiety overlaps the same area of the brain where bodily harm is registered. And Trezise and Reeve show that students' math anxiety can fluctuate throughout the duration of a math class.

== Math and culture ==
While there are overarching similarities concerning the acquisition of math skills, researchers have shown that children's mathematical abilities differ across countries. In Canada, students score substantially lower in math problem-solving and operations than students in Korea, India and Singapore. Researchers have conducted thorough comparisons between countries and determined that in some areas, such as Taiwan and Japan, parents place more emphasis on effort rather than one's innate intellectual ability in school success. By placing a higher emphasis on effort rather than one's innate intellectual ability, they are helping their child develop a growth mindset. People who develop a growth mindset believe that everyone has the ability to grow their intellectual ability, learn from their mistakes, and become more resilient learners. Rather than getting stuck on a problem and giving up, students with a growth mindset try other strategies to solve the problem. A growth mindset can benefit everyone, not just people trying to solve math computations. Moreover, parents in these countries tend to set higher expectations and standards for their children. In turn, students spend more time on homework and value homework more than American children.

In addition, researchers Jennifer L. Brown et al. shows that difference in level of mathematical anxiety among different countries may result from varying degrees of the courses. In the same culture, there is little difference in anxiety scale that is associated with gender, while the anxiety is more related with its type. Samples show greater degree of anxiety at subscale.

MEA (Mathematical Evaluation Anxiety) compared with LMA (Learning Mathematical Anxiety).

== Math and gender ==
Another difference in mathematic abilities often explored in research concerns gender disparities. There has been research examining gender differences in performance on standardized tests across various countries. Beller and Gafni's have shown that children at approximately nine years of age do not show consistent gender differences in relation to math skills. However, in 17 out of the 20 countries examined in this study, 13-year-old boys tended to score higher than girls. Moreover, mathematics is often labeled as a masculine ability; as a result, girls often have low confidence in their math capabilities. These gender stereotypes can reinforce low confidence in girls and can cause math anxiety as research has shown that performance on standardized math tests is affected by one's confidence. As a result, educators have been trying to abolish this stereotype by fostering confidence in math in all students in order to avoid math anxiety.

While on the other hand, results obtained by Monika Szczygiel show that girls have a higher level of anxiety on testing and in total, although there is no gender difference in general learning math anxiety. Therefore, the gender gap in math anxiety may result from the type of anxiety. Tests triggers greater anxiety in girls compared with boys, but they feel same level of anxiety learning math.

== Math pedagogy ==
The principles of mathematics are generally understood at an early age; preschoolers can comprehend the majority of principles underlying counting. By kindergarten, it is common for children to use counting in a more sophisticated manner by adding and subtracting numbers. While kindergarteners tend to use their fingers to count, this habit is soon abandoned and replaced with a more refined and efficient strategy; children begin to perform addition and subtraction mentally at approximately six years of age. When children reach approximately eight years of age, they can retrieve answers to mathematical equations from memory. With proper instruction, most children acquire these basic mathematical skills and are able to solve more complex mathematical problems with sophisticated training.

High-risk teaching styles are often explored to gain a better understanding of math anxiety. Goulding, Rowland, and Barber suggest that there are linkages between a teacher's lack of subject knowledge and the ability to plan teaching material effectively. These findings suggest that teachers who do not have a sufficient background in mathematics may struggle with the development of comprehensive lesson plans for their students. Similarly, Laturner's research shows that teachers with certification in math are more likely to be passionate and committed to teaching math than those without certification. However, those without certification vary in their commitment to the profession depending on coursework preparation.

A study conducted by Kawakami, Steele, Cifa, Phills, and Dovidio examined attitudes towards math and behavior during math examinations. The study examined the effect of extensive training in teaching women how to approach math. The results showed that women who were trained to approach rather than avoid math showed a positive implicit attitude towards math. These findings were only consistent with women low in initial identification with math. This study was replicated with women who were either encouraged to approach math or who received neutral training. Results were consistent and demonstrated that women taught to approach math had an implicit positive attitude and completed more math problems than women taught to approach math in a neutral manner.

Johns, Schmader, and Martens conducted a study in which they examined the effect of teaching stereotype threat as a means of improving women's math performance. The researchers concluded that women tended to perform worse than men when problems were described as math equations. However, women did not differ from men when the test sequence was described as problem-solving or in a condition in which they learned about stereotype threats. This research has practical implications. The results suggested that teaching students about stereotype threat could offer a practical means of reducing its detrimental effects and lead to an improvement in a girl's performance and mathematical ability, leading the researchers to conclude that educating female teachers about stereotype threat can reduce its negative effects in the classroom.

== Common beliefs ==
According to Margaret Murray, female mathematicians in the United States have almost always been a minority. Although the exact difference fluctuates with the times, as she has explored in her book Women Becoming Mathematicians: Creating a Professional Identity in Post-World War II America, "Since 1980, women have earned over 17 percent of the mathematics doctorates.... [In The United States]". The trends in gender are by no means clear, but perhaps parity is still a way to go. Since 1995, studies have shown that the gender gap favored males in most mathematical standardized testing as boys outperformed girls in 15 out of 28 countries. However, as of 2015 the gender gap has almost been reversed, showing an increase in female presence. This is being caused by women's steadily increasing performance on math and science testing and enrollment, but also by males' losing ground at the same time. This role reversal can largely be associated with the gender normative stereotypes that are found in the Science, technology, engineering, and mathematics (STEM) field, deeming "who math is for" and "who STEM careers are for". These stereotypes can fuel mathematical anxiety that is already present among young female populations. Thus parity will take more work to overcome mathematical anxiety and this is one reason why women in mathematics are role models for younger women.

== In schools ==
According to John Taylor Gatto, as expounded in several lengthy books, modern Western schools were deliberately designed during the late 19th century to create an environment which is ideal for fostering fear and anxiety, and for preventing or delaying learning. Many who are sympathetic to Gatto's thesis regard his position as unnecessarily extreme. Diane Ravitch, former assistant secretary of education during the George H. W. Bush administration, agrees with Gatto up to a point, conceding that there is an element of social engineering (i.e. the manufacture of the compliant citizenry) in the construction of the American education system, which prioritizes conformance over learning.

The role of attachment has been suggested as having an impact in the development of the anxiety. Children with an insecure attachment style were more likely to demonstrate the anxiety.

Math used to be taught as a right and wrong subject and as if getting the right answer were paramount. In contrast to most subjects, mathematics problems almost always have a right answer but there are many ways to obtain the answer. Previously, the subject was often taught as if there were a right way to solve the problem and any other approaches would be wrong, even if students got the right answer. However, mathematics has evolved and so has teaching it. Students used to have higher anxiety because of the way math was taught. "Teachers benefit children most when they encourage them to share their thinking process and justify their answers out loud or in writing as they perform math operations. ... With less of an emphasis on right or wrong and more of an emphasis on process, teachers can help alleviate students' anxiety about math".

=== Theoretical "solutions" ===
There have been many studies that show parent involvement in developing a child's educational processes is essential. A student's success in school is increased if their parents are involved in their education both at home and school. As a result, one of the easiest ways to reduce math anxiety is for the parent to be more involved in their child's education. In addition, research has shown that a parent's perception on mathematics influences their child's perception and achievement in mathematics.

Furthermore, studies by Herbert P. Ginsburg, Columbia University, show the influence of parents' and teachers' attitudes on "'the child's expectations in that area of learning.'... It is less the actual teaching and more the attitude and expectations of the teacher or parents that count". This is further supported by a survey of Montgomery County, Maryland students who "pointed to their parents as the primary force behind the interest in mathematics".

Claudia Zaslavsky contends that math has two components. The first component is to calculate the answer. This component also has two subcomponents, namely the answer and the process or method used to determine the answer. Focusing more on the process or method enables students to make mistakes, but not "fail at math". The second component is to understand the mathematical concepts that underlay the problem being studied. "... and in this respect studying mathematics is much more like studying, say, music or painting than it is like studying history or biology."

Amongst others supporting this viewpoint is the work of Eugene Geist. Geist's recommendations include focusing on the concepts rather than the right answer and letting students work on their own and discuss their solutions before the answer is given.

National Council of Teachers of Mathematics (NCTM) (1989, 1995b) suggestions for teachers seeking to prevent math anxiety include:

- Accommodating for different learning styles
- Creating a variety of testing environments
- Designing positive experiences in math classes
- Refraining from tying self-esteem to success with math
- Emphasizing that everyone makes mistakes in mathematics
- Making math relevant
- Letting students have some input into their own evaluations
- Allowing for different social approaches to learning mathematics
- Emphasizing the importance of original, quality thinking rather than rote manipulation of formulas

Hackworth suggests that the following activities can help students in reducing and mitigating mathematical anxiety:

- Discuss and write about math feelings;
- Become acquainted with good math instruction, as well as study techniques;
- Recognize what type of information needs to be learned;
- Be an active learner, and create problem-solving techniques;
- Evaluate your own learning;
- Develop calming/positive ways to deal with fear of math, including visualization, positive messages, relaxation techniques, frustration breaks;
- Use gradual, repeated success to build math confidence in students

B R Alimin and D B Widjajanti recommend teachers:

- Never make students embarrassed in front of the class
- Build harmony and friendship between teachers and students
- Give hints to students so that they can learn from mistakes
- Encourage students not to give up when they encounter challenges
- Teach students to help each other when working on math problems

Several studies have shown that relaxation techniques, including controlled breathing, can be used to help alleviate anxiety related to mathematics. In her workbook Conquering Math Anxiety, Cynthia Arem offers specific strategies to reduce math avoidance and anxiety. One strategy she advocates for is relaxation exercises and indicates that by practicing relaxation techniques on a regular basis for 10–20 minutes students can significantly reduce their anxiety.

Dr. Edmundo Jacobson's Progressive Muscle Relaxation taken from the book Mental Toughness Training for Sports, Loehr (1986) can be used in a modified form to reduce anxiety as posted on the website HypnoGenesis.

According to Mina Bazargan and Mehdi Amiri, Modular Cognitive Behavior Therapy (MCBT) can reduce the level of mathematical anxiety and increase students' self-esteem.

Visualization has also been used effectively to help reduce math anxiety. Arem has a chapter that deals with reducing test anxiety and advocates the use of visualization. In her chapter titled Conquer Test Anxiety (Chapter 9) she has specific exercises devoted to visualization techniques to help the student feel calm and confident during testing.

Studies have shown students learn best when they are active rather than passive learners.

The theory of multiple intelligences suggests that there is a need for addressing different learning styles. Math lessons can be tailored for visual/spatial, logical/mathematics, musical, auditory, body/kinesthetic, interpersonal and intrapersonal and verbal/linguistic learning styles. This theory of learning styles has never been demonstrated to be true in controlled trials. Studies show no evidence to support tailoring lessons to an individual students learning style to be beneficial.

New concepts can be taught through play acting, cooperative groups, visual aids, hands on activities or information technology.

Active learners ask critical questions, such as: Why do we do it this way, and not that way? Some teachers may find these questions annoying or difficult to answer, and indeed may have been trained to respond to such questions with hostility and contempt, designed to instill fear. Better teachers respond eagerly to these questions, and use them to help the students deepen their understanding by examining alternative methods so the students can choose for themselves which method they prefer. This process can result in meaningful class discussions. Talking is the way in which students increase their understanding and command of math. Teachers can give students insight as to why they learn certain content by asking students questions such as "what purpose is served by solving this problem?" and "why are we being asked to learn this?"

Reflective journals help students develop metacognitive skills by having them think about their understanding. According to Pugalee, writing helps students organize their thinking which helps them better understand mathematics. Moreover, writing in mathematics classes helps students problem solve and improve mathematical reasoning. When students know how to use mathematical reasoning, they are less anxious about solving problems.

It is thought that children learn best when mathematics is taught in a way that is relevant to their everyday lives. To learn mathematics in any depth, students should be engaged in exploring, conjecturing, and thinking, as well as in rote learning of rules and procedures.

== See also ==
- Cognitive science of mathematics
- Dyscalculia, a specific developmental disorder
- Educational psychology
- Foreign language anxiety
- Learning theory
- Mathematics education
- Primary education
- Pygmalion effect, the phenomenon whereby higher expectations lead to an increase in performance
- Stage fright
- Test anxiety
