= Adventures of the Gummi Bears =

American animated television series

- Genre: Adventure; Comedy; High fantasy
- Created by: Jymn Magon
- Directed by: Art Vitello (seasons 1–2); Alan Zaslove (season 3); David Block (seasons 4–6)
- Voices of: Bill Scott; Paul Winchell; June Foray; Lorenzo Music; Katie Leigh; Noelle North; Rob Paulsen; Corey Burton; Jim Cummings; Michael Rye; Christian Jacobs; Brett Johnson; David Faustino; Jason Marsden; R. J. Williams; Roger C. Carmel; Brian Cummings; Bob Holt; Howard Morris; Walker Edmiston
- Theme music composer: Silversher & Silversher
- Opening theme: "Gummi Bears Theme" by Joseph Williams
- Ending theme: "Gummi Bears Theme" (Instrumental + Shortened)
- Composers: Thomas Chase; Steve Rucker
- Country of origin: United States
- Original language: English
- No. of seasons: 6
- No. of episodes: 65 (95 segments) (list of episodes)

Production
- Producers: Art Vitello (seasons 1–2); Tad Stones (season 3); Alan Zaslove (season 3); Rich Fogel (seasons 4–6); Mark Seidenberg (seasons 4–6); David Block (seasons 4–6)
- Running time: 23 minutes
- Production company: Walt Disney Television Animation (Note: Credited as Walt Disney Pictures Television Animation Group in season 1 and Walt Disney Pictures Television Animation in season 2.)

Original release
- Network: NBC
- Release: September 14, 1985 – December 17, 1988
- Network: ABC
- Release: September 9, 1989 – January 6, 1990
- Network: Syndication (The Disney Afternoon)
- Release: September 10, 1990 – February 22, 1991

Adventures of the Gummi Bears is an American animated high fantasy television series created by Jymn Magon and produced by Walt Disney Television Animation. The series, loosely inspired by gummy bear candies, takes place in a fantasy world of medieval lands and magic, and focuses on the lives of six mystical beings known as Gummi Bears. The series focuses on the exploits of the main characters, as they tackle a series of problems, as well as aid their human friends and thwart the plans of various evil characters. Episodes consisted of either a single story, or two 11-minute stories.

The lavishly budgeted series became iconic for not only spearheading the style of Disney animated series that followed, but also starting an era of artistic improvement in television animation spurred on its success with competitors forced to improve their own artistic standards to avoid unfavorable comparisons. The theme music was written by Michael and Patty Silversher and performed by Joseph Williams. The animated series first premiered in the United States, running for six seasons between 1985 and 1991, with the show later broadcast to other countries including the United Kingdom.

== Premise ==
Adventures of the Gummi Bears takes place in a medieval fairy tale world and focuses on a group of six "Gummi Bears", a race of anthropomorphic bears with great skills in magic and technology. The group lives in the underground secret settlement of Gummi Glen within the forest of the kingdom of Dunwyn. Long ago, the Gummi Bears had a powerful and highly developed civilization, but were persecuted by human armies who sought access to the Gummi Bears' knowledge and ultimately drove almost all Gummi Bears north. Most of the Gummi Bears then settled on a continent unknown to humans and were forgotten over time. They are now generally considered a legend by humans, but a few know that they still exist. Throughout the Gummi Bears' search for their heritage, old ruins and intact buildings with some high-tech devices are repeatedly discovered.

Despite their efforts to continue living free from human influence and safe from threats, the bears of Gummi Glen gradually encounter several humans. Contrary to all fears and prejudices, the encounters do not always result in confrontation and fighting; while most humans dismiss every encounter as an illusion and put it out of their mind, some humans (especially children) try to befriend the Gummi Bears. Only those who still believe in and know about the Gummi Bears and their magic try to capture them. The Gummi Bears' closest friends among humans are Princess Calla, the daughter of King Gregor and heir to Dunwyn's throne, and Cavin, the squire of Gregor's chief knight Sir Tuxford.

The Gummi Bears owe their name to a magic potion named "gummiberry juice", which allows them to bounce like a rubber ball. Gummiberry juice is made by Grammi Gummi using an ancient and secret recipe from the Gummiberries that grow in the Dunwyn forest. The gummiberry juice gives humans and monsters superhuman strength for a short time, but unlike Gummi Bears, it only works on humans once a day. The evil and power-hungry Duke Igthorn is constantly trying to obtain the formula of the potion and the remaining secrets of the Gummi Bears with his servant Toadwart and his private army of simple-minded ogres. He seeks to conquer Dunwyn, dethrone the king and establish a reign of terror. The Gummi Bears often have to intervene – albeit secretly – to protect the king, their friends and their secrets from the machinations of Igthorn and other enemies.

== Characters ==
The Gummi-Glen Bears (from left to right): Cubbi, Sunni, Gruffi, Zummi, Tummi, and Grammi.

- Zummi Gummi (voiced by Paul Winchell in Seasons 1-5 and Jim Cummings in Season 6) – An aged bear who is the Gummi Glen leader, caretaker of Gummi Bear knowledge and wisdom, and a modest magician. He is somewhat forgetful with spells, speaking occasionally with mild spoonerisms, and having a fear of heights.
- Gruffi Gummi (voiced by Bill Scott in Season 1 and Corey Burton in Seasons 2–6) – Gummi Glen's grumpy and conservative craftsman and mechanic. He is the voice of reason and a cunning strategist for the group, though his perfectionism regularly becomes his downfall.
- Grammi Gummi (voiced by June Foray) – the matriarch of Gummi Glen, responsible for cooking for the group, housework in their home, and preparing Gummiberry Juice through the secret recipe passed down to her.
- Tummi Gummi (voiced by Lorenzo Music) – An overweight teenage Gummi Bear cub, and the eldest of the three in the group. He is relaxed, laid-back and easygoing, and harbors a great love of food, but has remarkable (if mostly hidden) technical skills and good comprehension, and often behaves impartially in disputes or acts as an arbitrator.
- Sunni Gummi (voiced by Katie Leigh) – An excitable and naive preteen Gummi Bear cub who exhibits a keen interest in human culture and fashion rather than in Gummi history.
- Cubbi Gummi (voiced by Noelle North) – A young Gummi Bear cub, the youngest of the three in Gummi Glen, who dreams of becoming a knight. He is characterized as being adventurous and somewhat impetuous, but with an open-mindedness to finding solutions to problems he faces.
- Cavin (voiced by Christian Jacobs in Season 1, Brett Johnson in Season 2, David Faustino in Season 3; Jason Marsden in Seasons 4 & 5 and R.J. Williams in Season 6) – A young boy serving as a page and squire in Dunwyn Castle. He is courageous and good-hearted, is the first human to encounter the Gummi Bears, and befriends them as a result of possessing a Gummi medallion that he leaves with Zummi, becoming friends with Cubbi over time.
- Princess Calla (voiced by Noelle North) – A princess of Dunwyn, who is defiantly adventurous, capable of defending herself, despite her dislike of her circumstances and royal duties. She is friends with Cavin, and also becomes friends with Sunni after meeting the Gummi Bears during the first season.
- King Gregor (voiced by Michael Rye) – The king of Dunwyn, characterized as a benevolent, brave, and good ruler for his people. Like most humans, he believes Gummi Bears are a myth, and thus does not know of their actions helping to protect his kingdom. However, he does discover his daughter's previously hidden fighting prowess towards the end of the series and is deeply impressed by her.
- Sir Tuxford (voiced by Bill Scott in Season 1, Roger C. Carmel in Season 2 and Brian Cummings in Seasons 3–6) – The highest ranking knight of King Gregor's court and his trusted friend, as well as Cavin's superior. Tuxford is characterized as being an old, jolly man despite being somewhat past his prime for battle.
- Duke Sigmund Igthorn (voiced by Michael Rye) – A disgraced knight of Dunwyn, exiled for conspiring against King Gregor, who leads an army of ogres to attack the kingdom from his fortress of Castle Drekmore. He is characterized as a vengeful, power-crazed tyrant. A common element in stories he is involved in is his desire to find a suitable weapon for his plans, as well as capturing Gummi Bears for their Juice, especially the recipe required to produce it.
- Toadwart (voiced by Bill Scott in Season 1 and Corey Burton in Seasons 2–6) – A dwarf ogre, who serves as Igthorn's illeist lieutenant and second-in-command, often nicknamed Toadie. He is characterized as being smarter than other ogres, due to his ability to read and write. Affectionately sycophantic to the Duke, if only because associating with the Duke gives him some authority over the ogres, who otherwise casually abuse him for fun.
- Augustus "Gusto" Gummi (voiced by Rob Paulsen) – An artistic Gummi Bear, stranded on a deserted island with his friend Artie Deco, a wise-talking toucan (voiced by Jymn Magon in his debut episode, and Brian Cummings for the rest of the series), before taking residence near to Gummi Glen and aiding the other Gummi Bears when needed. He is often considered to be the seventh Gummi by the fans and the show's staff. Gusto is characterized as being an individualist with an outside-the-box problem solving ability.
- Lady Bane (voiced by Tress MacNeille) – A human sorceress of considerable power, who maintains her youth magically and desires all of Gummi Bear magic for herself. She resembles and is based on the Queen from Disney's Snow White and the Seven Dwarfs.
- Sir Thornberry (voiced by Walker Edmiston) – An aged Gummi Bear knight who acts as the caretaker of the otherwise isolated Gummi Bear city of Ursalia. His manner is eccentric by a probable combination of his extended isolation and senility, but still capable within his mental limits.
- Ursa (voiced by Pat Musick) – The statuesque female leader of the Barbics, a barbarian tribe of Gummi Bears driven from their native lands by humans and are scornful of orthodox Gummi traditions. She and her tribe take up residence in Ursalia at the Gummi Glen Gummies and Sir Thornberry's invitation.

== Episodes ==
Season	Segments	Episodes	Originally released	
Season	Segments	Episodes	First released	Last released
1	21	13	September 14, 1985	December 21, 1985
2	12	8	September 13, 1986	November 29, 1986
3	14	8	September 12, 1987	December 12, 1987
4	16	10	September 10, 1988	December 17, 1988
5	13	9	September 9, 1989	January 6, 1990
6	19	17	September 10, 1990	February 22, 1991

== Broadcast ==
The series premiered on NBC on September 14, 1985, and aired there for four seasons. The series moved to ABC (later acquired by Disney in 1996) for one season from 1989 to 1990, airing alongside The New Adventures of Winnie the Pooh as the Gummi Bears-Winnie the Pooh Hour, and concluded on September 6, 1991, as part of the syndicated programming block The Disney Afternoon. The series was later rebroadcast on the Disney Afternoon block and rerun on that block through September 1991. In later years, reruns were shown on The Disney Channel from October 7, 1991 to at least January 1997, and later on Toon Disney, with its most recent televised airing occurring on December 28, 2001.

=== Video on demand ===
The series has been on Disney+ since that service's debut on November 12, 2019.

== Home media ==
=== VHS ===
==== International releases ====
Several VHS cassettes of the series were released internationally. Of those, eight cassettes containing 32 episodes are listed below. The first four cassettes ("Welcome to Gummiglen!", "Creature Feature", "Hot Little Tot!", and "A Sky Full of Gummies!"), which contain 20 episodes, were released in English in the United Kingdom, Australia, and New Zealand. These four cassettes were also released in some European countries (including Poland, the Netherlands and Germany). The other four cassettes, as well as the ones not listed below, were released exclusively in other European countries (including the Netherlands, Poland, Finland, and Italy).

VHS name	Episode titles	Release date
Adventures of the Gummi Bears (Volume 1): Welcome to Gummiglen!	"A New Beginning" "Zummi Makes it Hot" "The Sinister Sculptor" "Someday My Prints Will Come" "Can I Keep Him?"	September 11, 1996
Adventures of the Gummi Bears (Volume 2): Creature Feature	"The Fence Sitter" "Night of the Gargoyle" "Loopy, Go Home" "A-Hunting We Will Go" "The Secret of the Juice"	September 11, 1996
Adventures of the Gummi Bears (Volume 3): Hot Little Tot!	"Sweet and Sour Gruffi" "Duel of the Wizards" "What You See is Me" "Bubble Trouble" "Toadie's Wild Ride" "Gummi in a Strange Land"	September 11, 1996
Adventures of the Gummi Bears (Volume 4): A Sky Full of Gummies!	"A Gummi in a Gilded Cage" "The Oracle" "When You Wish Upon a Stone" "A Gummi by Any Other Name"	September 11, 1996
Adventures of the Gummi Bears (Volume 5): The Crimson Avenger	"The Crimson Avenger" "You Snooze, You Loose" "Over the River and Through the Trolls"	September 10, 1997
Adventures of the Gummi Bears (Volume 6): Wild Ride	"Toadie's Wild Ride" "Sweet and Sour Gruffi" "Duel of the Wizards" "What You See is Me"	September 10, 1997
Adventures of the Gummi Bears (Volume 7): Up, Up, and Away	"Up, Up, and Away" "Faster Than a Speeding Tummi"	September 10, 1997
Adventures of the Gummi Bears (Volume 8): For Whom the Spell Holds	"For Whom the Spell Holds" "Little Bears Lost" "Guess Who's Gumming to Dinner?"	September 10, 1997

=== DVD releases ===
Seasons 1 to 3 of the series were released on a 3-disc set on November 14, 2006, when Walt Disney Home Entertainment released Disney's Adventures of the Gummi Bears: Volume 1 on DVD in Region 1. The DVD does not contain any bonus features, save for subtitles for the hearing impaired.

DVD name	Ep#	Release date
Disney's Adventures of the Gummi Bears: Volume 1	47	November 14, 2006

To date, the series has never officially been released on DVD in the UK, but since November 2016, the show has been available on the UK Disney streaming website DisneyLife.

In Australia, Disney released nine volumes, which have now long been discontinued. They are all in complete storyline production order, but the first volume starts from episode 19 in series 2. Episodes 1-18 have not been released on DVD in Australia and are only available on the USA Region 1 collection, but the Region 4 Australian DVDs do finish off the series and go right up to episode 65 of the series' final two-part double episode adventure.

== Media adaptations ==
=== Comic strip ===
Gummi Bears was adapted into a daily newspaper comic, which ran from September 1, 1986, to April 1, 1989. The strip was written by Lee Nordling and illustrated by Rich Hoover.

== Legacy ==
Disney's Adventures of the Gummi Bears was Disney's first major serialized animated television series (it was released back to back with another show, The Wuzzles, which lasted only 13 episodes), and is often credited as having helped jump start the television animation boom of the late 1980s and 1990s. Consequently, it also became the forerunner to Disney's famous Disney Afternoon timeslot, which gave way to other famous serialized Disney television series, such as DuckTales, Chip 'n Dale Rescue Rangers and Gargoyles. Although many of these subsequently-created shows exceeded Gummi Bears in budget and length, the show is often credited as a sort of prototype for all of the animation which followed it.

The show was so successful in the United Kingdom that the episodes "A New Beginning" and "Faster Than a Speeding Tummi" were released as theatrical featurettes there in 1986 and 1987, alongside The Great Mouse Detective and a re-release of Disney's Pinocchio.

Appearances of Gummi Bears in other media include one of Gruffi Gummi in a D-TV music video of the Elvis Presley song "Teddy Bear", in 1986.

The show's popularity led to a re-theming of Disneyland's Motor Boat Cruise, along with a small part of Disneyland that became known as "Disney Afternoon Avenue". The Motor Boat Cruise became the "Motor Boat Cruise to Gummi Glen" and plywood characters from the show made gummiberry juice along the waterway. The Gummi Bears have been featured as meetable characters who greet guests in Disney theme parks.

The opening title was featured in an episode of Ted, where Ted auditions for a school play by singing the theme song.

=== Cameos ===
- DuckTales (2017–2021): In the episode "From the Confidential Case Files of Agent 22!", the Gummi Bears make a cameo while gummiberry juice factors into the episode's plot.
- Characters of the series have appeared several times in the animated series Chibiverse in the episodes "Journey To The Center Of Chibiverse" and "Mystery Busters".
