= List of mayors of Fort Collins, Colorado =

The following is a list of mayors of the city of Fort Collins, Colorado, United States.

- Benjamin Whedbee, 1873-1879
- David Patton, 1880
- Jacob Welch, 1881
- George B. Brown, 1882
- Abraham L. Emigh, 1883
- John M. Davidson, 1884
- George Bristol, 1885-1887
- James C. Evans, 1888
- E. A. Lee, 1889
- Henry H. Hall, 1890
- William B. Miner, 1891-1892
- James B. Arthur, 1893-1894
- Frederick R. Baker, 1895-1902
- P. J. McHugh, 1903-1904
- Sam H. Clammer, 1905–1908, 1913-1918
- Myron H. Akin, 1909-1910
- Jesse Harris, 1911-1912
- H. M. Balmer, 1913
- Fred W. Stover, 1918-1924
- Frank R. Montgomery, 1924-1930
- Harry H. Hartman, 1930-1936
- Ray R. Mathews, 1936-1942
- William M. Bevington, 1942-1948
- Robert W. Hays, 1948-1954
- C. H. Alford, 1954-1955
- William H. Allen, 1955-1957
- Robert W. Sears, 1957-1959
- Jack A. Harvey, 1959-1961
- Eugene H. Frink, 1961-1963
- Harvey J. Johnson, 1963-1967
- Thomas Bennett, 1967-1968
- Karl Carson, 1968-1973
- Mable Preble, 1973-1974
- J.W.N. Fead, 1974-1975
- Jack Russell, 1975-1976
- Earl Wilkinson, 1976-1977
- Arvid R. Bloom, 1977-1978
- Richard M. Suinn, 1978-1979
- Chuck D.Bowling, 1979-1980
- Nancy P. Gray, 1980-1981
- Elery Wilmarth, 1981-1982
- Gary G. Cassell, 1982-1983
- John B. Knezovich, 1983-1984
- Gerry Horak, 1984-1985
- Barbara Rutstein, 1985-1986
- Kelly Ohlson, 1986-1987
- Larry Estrada, 1987-1988
- Ed Stoner, 1988-1989
- Bob Winokur, 1989-1990
- Susan Kirkpatrick, 1990-1993
- Ann Azari, 1993-1999
- Ray Martinez, 1999-2005
- Doug Hutchinson, 2005-2011
- Karen Weitkunat, 2011-2015
- Wade Troxell, 2015-2021
- Jennifer Arndt, 2021-2026
- Emily Francis, 2026-current

== See also ==
- Fort Collins history
