= Doug Hutchinson =

American mayor of Fort Collins, Colorado

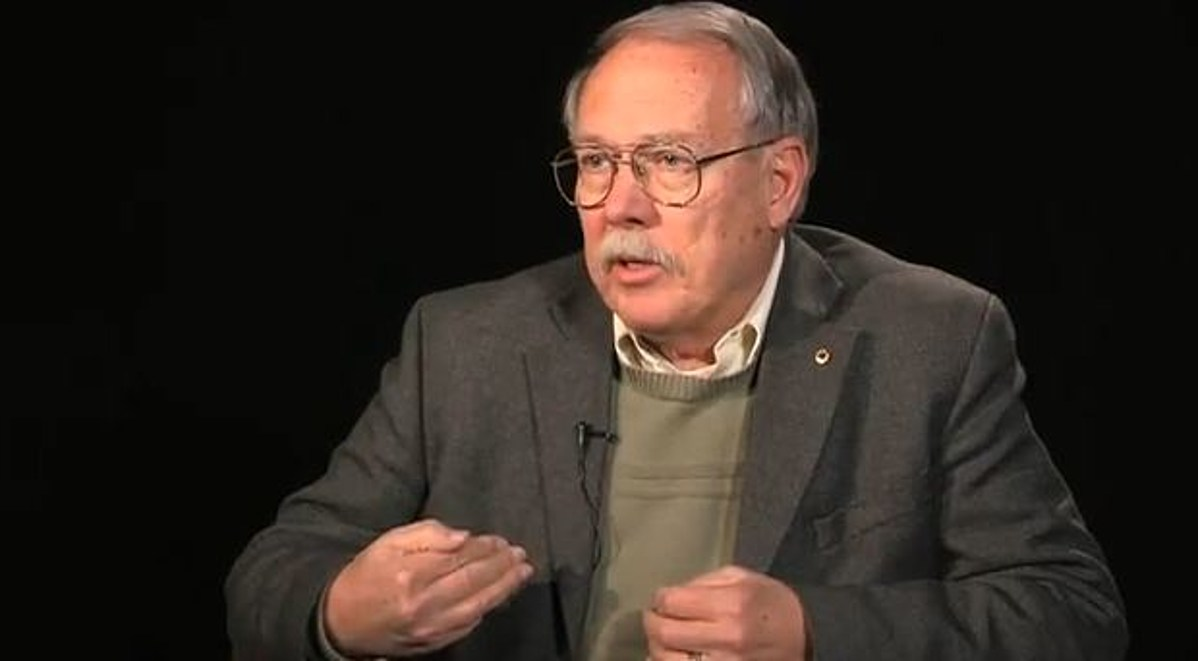

Mayor of Fort Collins, Colorado
- In office April 19, 2005 – April 12, 2011
- Preceded by: Ray Martinez
- Succeeded by: Karen Weitkunat

Personal details
- Born: March 2, 1942 (age 84) Billings, Montana
- Party: Republican
- Spouse: Catherine Thayer McKellar Hutchinson

Doug Hutchinson (born March 2, 1942) is a former mayor of the city of Fort Collins, Colorado.

== Early life and career ==
Born in Billings, Montana and raised in Fort Collins, Hutchinson graduated from Fort Collins High School and attended Colorado State University, earning a bachelor's degree in chemistry in 1965. After graduation, Hutchinson served for over twenty years in the United States Air Force. During his time in the Air Force, he earned a master's degree in systems management from the University of Southern California in 1976. He retired with the rank of lieutenant colonel in 1989 and then worked as a civilian Department of Defense employee before retiring to Fort Collins in 1999. Hutchinson and his late wife Cathy, have four children and twelve grandchildren.

== Mayor of Fort Collins ==
After returning to Fort Collins, Hutchinson became involved in politics, and wrote a column on local government for the Fort Collins Coloradoan. Hutchinson ran for mayor in 2005, defeating city council member Bill Bertschy, Libertarian Mark Brophy, and high-school teacher Scott VanTatenhove. During his campaign, he was the beneficiary of support from the Fort Collins Chamber of Commerce in their first endeavor supporting local candidates. The Chamber of Commerce again endorsed Hutchinson during his 2007 campaign for re-election.

Part of a "pro-business" conservative ideological majority during his first two years leading Fort Collins City Council, Hutchinson has expressed a personal desire to maintain balance between economic development and environmental protection. During his first term as mayor, Hutchinson introduced a new city budgeting process, and touted a healing of personal rifts between council members under his leadership. While mayor, he has also been named to the executive board of the Colorado Municipal League, and as a director of the Colorado Climate Project.

In the April 2007 municipal elections, Hutchinson again faced high school teacher Scott VanTatenhove for a second two-year term as mayor., winning re-election overwhelmingly, but facing leadership of a council which saw a shift to a more "progressive" majority.

In the April 2009 municipal elections, Hutchinson was elected to a third two-year term as mayor.

Doug has maintained his philanthropy and service throughout Northern Colorado since his term as mayor ended. Doug has served as the President of the Fort Collins Lions Club, a Community Foundation Trustee since 2012, and the chairman of the board of directors for the Ensight Skills Center which provides low vision rehabilitation to the community. Doug and his family currently reside in Fort Collins.

== See also ==
- List of mayors of Fort Collins, Colorado
