= Depression and Bipolar Support Alliance (Greater Houston) =

The Depression and Bipolar Support Alliance (DBSA) Greater Houston is a 501(c)(3) non-profit organization located in Houston, Texas. DBSA Greater Houston is a chapter of the national Depression and Bipolar Support Alliance. DBSA sponsors free support groups to assist in the recovery of individuals with depression or bipolar disorder. Support groups are also offered to family members and friends. Each support group is led by a facilitator trained by the organization. Select groups target specific populations including veterans, adolescents, and parents of adolescents, young adults, senior citizens and Spanish-speaking individuals.

== History ==
Established in 1979, the Depressive and Manic Disorder Association (DMDA) of Greater Houston sponsored up to five weekly support groups for those with depressive or manic depressive disorders. In 2003, DMDA Greater Houston changed its name to DBSA Greater Houston and formed its own 501(c) (3) corporation. Currently, DBSA Greater Houston sponsors nearly 60 weekly support groups at 33 different locations throughout the Houston metropolitan area. The Houston organization is the largest of the nation's DBSA chapters, serving over 1,000 support group participants annually.

== Affiliation ==
DBSA Greater Houston is a chapter member of the national Depression and Bipolar Support Alliance organization based in Chicago, Illinois. Additionally, the organization has developed collaborations with a number of Houston area mental health and social service providers including the Harris County Hospital District, the Texas Department of Corrections, the Harris County judicial system, the Michael DeBakey VA Hospital, Mental Health of America, National Alliance on Mental Illness and the AIDS Foundation of Houston.

== Statistics ==
DBSA Greater Houston utilizes 75 trained volunteer and professional facilitators to provide nearly 60 weekly support groups. According to an independently conducted demographics study in 2008, 64% of DBSA Greater Houston participants were female, 36% were male; 77% were diagnosed individuals while 23% were family members; 66% reported a diagnosis and/or symptoms of depression, 69% were diagnosed with bipolar disorder; 88% were prescribed psychotropic medications and 65% were in professional therapy.

In 2006 DBSA Greater received the Chapter of the Year award from the national Depression and Bipolar Support Alliance.

== Recent developments ==
In the fall of 2008, DBSA Greater Houston published an outcome study independently conducted by Dr. Ralph Culler, former Associate Dean of Research at the Hogg Foundation for Mental Health. The outcome study was designed to analyze the effectiveness of the DBSA Greater Houston support group model. The study provided tools for DBSA Greater Houston to (1) provide quantitative and qualitative evidence that its support group model is effective (2) prove DBSA Greater Houston's accountability to individuals utilizing its services and; (3) learn how the benefits of DBSA occur.

This study provided evidenced-based results that the DBSA Greater Houston support group model was effective in a number of areas. The study used an outcome questionnaire which asked a broad range of questions regarding demographics, medical data, outcome assessments and satisfaction with the support group experience. On average 89% of group participants experienced an improvement in their quality of life as a direct benefit of their participation in the DBSA groups. 93% of participants reported high or very high satisfaction with their DBSA support group experience.

== See also ==
- Depression and Bipolar Support Alliance
- International Society for Bipolar Disorders
- Outline of bipolar disorder
- Bipolar disorder
- Major depressive disorder
