= Broadway Cares/Equity Fights AIDS =

American nonprofit organization

Broadway Cares/Equity Fights AIDS, Inc.
- Predecessor: Equity Fights AIDS (formed October 1987); Broadway Cares (formed February 1988)
- Formation: May 1992 (merger of Broadway Cares and Equity Fights AIDS)
- Type: Nonprofit organization
- Purpose: AIDS-related charity
- Headquarters: 165 West 46th Street, #1300; Manhattan, New York City New York 10036; United States
- Website: broadwaycares.org

Broadway Cares/Equity Fights AIDS (BC/EFA) is an American nonprofit organization that raises funds for AIDS-related causes across the United States, headquartered in New York City. It is the theatre community's response to the HIV/AIDS epidemic. By drawing upon the talents, resources and generosity of the American theatre community, BC/EFA has raised over $300 million for critically needed services for people with AIDS, HIV, and other critical illnesses since its founding in 1988. The organization awards annual grants to over 450 AIDS and family service organizations across all 50 states, Puerto Rico and Washington, D.C., and is the single largest financial supporter of the social service programs of The Actors Fund.

== History ==
Broadway Cares/Equity Fights AIDS was originally two separate organizations. In October 1987, the Council of Actors' Equity Association founded Equity Fights AIDS, and in February 1988, The Producers' Group founded Broadway Cares, both in response to the growing AIDS epidemic. The groups merged in May 1992, to form Broadway Cares/Equity Fights AIDS. The new organization was established as a not-for-profit fundraiser and took on the missions of the previous organizations.

At the 47th Tony Awards in 1993, it was awarded a Tony Honors for Excellence in Theatre.

Tom Viola has run the organization as its executive director since 1996, but has been involved since its inception in 1988. In honor of his exceptional work at Broadway Cares, Viola was awarded a Tony Honors for Excellence in Theatre at the 64th Tony Awards in 2010. Viola attributes the growth of the leading organization to the establishment of the Phyllis Newman Women's Health Initiative in 1996.

== Grants ==
The organization's grant-making has two emphases. The first is Actors' Fund of America. Broadway Cares supports seven major social service programs at The Fund, each of which provides direct assistance to entertainment industry professionals and performing artists who are dealing with a variety of problems, including AIDS, HIV, and HIV-related issues. These seven social service programs are the HIV/AIDS Initiative, the Al Hirschfeld Free Health Clinic, the Phyllis Newman Women's Health Initiative, the Actors Health Insurance Resource Center, the Actors Fund Work Program, the Stage Managers' Project and The Dancers' Resource. Since 1988, Broadway Cares has given $101 million to The Actors Fund.

The second major grant-making effort is the National Grants Program, through which the organization makes grants twice a year to more than 450 community-based AIDS Service organizations across the country in all 50 states. These grants total more than $10 million annually. Since 1988, more than $82 million has been given by BC/EFA to AIDS and family service organizations.

These ASOs include:

- Lifelong AIDS Alliance
- Navajo AIDS Network
- Project Open Hand
- San Francisco AIDS Foundation
- ActionAIDS
- AIDS Foundation Houston
- AIDS Foundation of Chicago
- Center for HIV Law and Policy
- Treatment Action Group
- San Antonio AIDS Foundation
- Mama's Kitchen
- Special Delivery San Diego
- RAIN Charlotte
- RAIN Oklahoma City
- Equitas Health

== Fundraising ==
Broadway Cares has two major fundraising periods, The Easter Bonnet Competition (in the spring) and The Red Bucket Follies Competition (previously known as The Gypsy of the Year Competition) in the Fall. Over six weeks of fund-raising shows on and Off-Broadway engage in a friendly competition to see which show can raise the most money for BC/EFA. Awards are presented to the shows raising the most money and to the winning presentation.

During this fundraising period, actors return to the stage after bows and ask patrons to donate as they leave the theater. Some actors have objected to this, because they oppose asking patrons for more money, or because they do not wish to break character. The shows are in competition to raise funds, and use various approaches, such as auctioning signed memorabilia, to raise more than other shows.

== Easter Bonnet ==
Easter Bonnet is an annual spring fundraiser in the theatre community, produced by and benefiting Broadway Cares. For six weeks, shows fundraise in their theaters, whether they are on Broadway, Off-Broadway, or touring. Volunteers and cast members hold red buckets after each performance and collect donations. Some shows sell autographed Playbills, posters, and props. Other shows offer auctions to meet the cast backstage or win an autographed prop. At the end of the six weeks, each show is invited to participate in the two-day Easter Bonnet competition. During this competition, performers from participating shows sing and dance while wearing their shows' unique "Easter Bonnets". Guest judges then choose award recipients for best bonnet design and performance.

The 2014 judges at the 28th Annual Easter Bonnet Competition were Gregg Barnes, Christopher Hanke, Carly Rae Jepsen, Michael McKean, Jim Norton, Patrick Page, Annie Potts, Anthony Rapp, and two judges who won their spot on the panel through an auction at the 27th Annual Broadway Flea Market and Grand Auction. The judges selected The Lion King for best presentation and Once for best bonnet design. The 2014 Easter Bonnet Competition raised $4,532,129.

The 2015 judges at the 29th Annual Easter Bonnet Competition were Actors Fund of America President and CEO Joseph Benincasa, Michael Cerveris and Judy Kuhn from Fun Home, Corey Cott and Vanessa Hudgens from Gigi, Robert Fairchild and director/choreographer Christopher Wheeldon from An American in Paris, Judith Ivey and Rufus Wright from The Audience, and Nathaniel Parker from Wolf Hall Parts One & Two. Two additional judges, Jake Perlman and Peg Wendlandt, were high bidders at the 28th Annual Broadway Flea Market and Grand Auction. The company of Avenue Q won the 2015 Best Presentation Award, and the company of Jersey Boys won the 2015 Best Design Award for their bonnet. The 2015 Easter Bonnet Competition raised $4,711,386.

On April 25 and 26, 2016, the 30th Annual event raised $5,528,568. Broadway's Hamilton raised the most money of any show ($516,029). An American in Paris won the Best Bonnet Design award. Performers included Stevie Nicks, Jennifer Hudson and Jesse Tyler Ferguson, and the cast of Hamilton performing a remixed version of the opening number to Hamilton with lyrics about Sweeney Todd. of Sweeney Todd: The Demon Barber of Fleet Street.

On April 24 and 25, 2017, the 31st Annual event raised $6,379,572. Sunset Boulevard raised the most money, followed by Sunday in the Park with George and Dear Evan Hansen. Celebrities included Patti LuPone, Bette Midler, Josh Groban and Ben Platt.

The 32nd Annual edition was held April 23 and 24, 2018. Celebrity presenters included Bernadette Peters, Nathan Lane and Andrew Garfield. The show included performances by the casts of SpongeBob SquarePants: The Musical, Dear Evan Hansen and Hamilton. Hamilton raised the most money of any show and a tour of Hamilton raised the most money of any tour. The 2015 Easter Bonnet Competition raised $5,721,879, with Hamilton as highest fundraiser with $402,083.

On April 22 and 23, 2019, the 33rd Annual edition was held at the Minskoff Theatre. The fundraising total of $6,594,778 was announced by Bryan Cranston, Kelli O'Hara, Glenda Jackson and Jeff Daniels. The top fundraiser was the Hamilton – And Peggy tour, which raised $513,734. Lin-Manuel Miranda made a surprise appearance to accept the award.

After a two-year hiatus, Broadway Cares' red buckets returned to theaters for a Spring Fundraising Campaign March 18 – May 1, 2022. Among the shows fundraising are Aladdin, The Book of Mormon, Chicago, Come From Away, Company, Dear Evan Hansen, Hadestown, Hamilton, Harry Potter and the Cursed Child, The Lion King, Moulin Rouge! The Musical, The Music Man, The Phantom of the Opera, SIX, Tina, and Wicked and the Off-Broadway productions of Jersey Boys, Little Shop of Horrors, and The Play That Goes Wrong.

In 2023, the 36th Annual Easter Bonnet Competition ran from March 10–23 raising $3,601,355. Announced by Annaleigh Ashford, Jessica Chastain, Josh Groban and Lea Michele, the award for top fundraiser went to & Juliet, followed by The Phantom of the Opera, Moulin Rouge! The Musical, Wicked and Funny Girl. A Doll's House was the top Broadway Play, raising $176,480.

The fundraising was celebrated with two days of performances at Broadway's Minskoff Theatre. The award for best presentation went to the cast of The Lion King. First runner-up went to The Phantom of the Opera. The award for best bonnet design went to Chicago. Other participating shows included Parade, Bad Cinderella, Parsons Dance, Kimberly Akimbo, A Beautiful Noise, Some Like It Hot, Little Shop of Horrors, Six and Hamilton.

== Red Bucket Follies (Prev. Gypsy of the Year) ==
In 2018, the competition previously called "Gypsy of the Year" was renamed "Red Bucket Follies."

Every autumn (usually around the end of October until the first week of December), companies of Broadway, off-Broadway and national tours raise donations for Broadway Cares.

The 1st edition of the Gypsy of the Year competition was held on November 28, 1989, and was hosted by Jonathan Hadary and Tyne Daly. The first show raised $70,000.

The 21st edition of the Gypsy of the Year competition was held on December 10, 2009. Daniel Craig and Hugh Jackman participated in the Broadway Cares/Equity Fights AIDS fundraising event in New York, raising $1,549,953 from 6 weeks of curtain appeals at their hit Broadway drama, A Steady Rain. The 2009 Gypsy of the Year Competition raised $4,630,695.

The 25th edition of the Gypsy of the Year competition was held on December 9 and 10, 2013, at the Minskoff Theatre. Best Presentation was awarded to The Lion King for the second year in a row while Kinky Boots was celebrated as the top fundraiser, bringing in $377,301. The 25th annual event raised $4,343,234.

The 26th edition of the Gypsy of the Year competition was held on December 8 and 9, 2014, at the New Amsterdam Theatre. Best presentation was awarded to The Lion King for the third year in a row, while The River took the title as top fundraiser, having raised $549,725. It was followed by It's Only a Play. The event, which featured Hugh Jackman, Judith Light, Nathan Lane, and a 40th Anniversary Celebration of The Wiz, raised $5,229,611.

The 27th edition of the Gypsy of the Year competition was held on December 7 and 8, 2015, raised $4,786,239. The largest fundraiser was the "Latter Day" tour of The Book of Mormon with $344,643. The Lion King won best presentation. Wayne Brady, Lin-Manuel Miranda and Christopher Jackson performed a freestyle rap. and the cast of Hamilton performed "Wait for It".

The 28th edition of the Gypsy of the Year competition was held on December 5 and 6, 2016, and raised $4,492,636 for Broadway Cares. Celebrities who appeared onstage included Cynthia Erivo, Jessie Mueller and Javier Munoz. The cast of Jersey Boys raised the most money, followed by Hamilton and the national tour of Wicked.

The 29th edition of the Gypsy of the Year competition was held December 4 and 5, 2017, and raised $5,609,211 for Broadway Cares. The largest fundraiser was Dear Evan Hansen followed by Hello, Dolly! and the Angelica tour of Hamilton. The company of Come From Away took top honors for best onstage presentation, and the runner-up was Aladdin. Celebrity appearances included Amy Schumer, Keegan-Michael Key, Noah Galvin, and Laura Benanti.

The 30th edition of the Red Bucket Follies (formerly Gypsy of the Year) competition was held on December 3 and 4, 2018, at the New Amsterdam Theatre, and the fundraising total was $6,113,301 from 67 Broadway, off-Broadway, and touring productions. The top overall fundraiser was the "Angelica" leg of the Hamilton tour, which made $515,152. The musical was also the top fundraiser on Broadway with $414,971.

The 31st edition of the Red Bucket Follies competition was held on December 9 and 10, 2019, at the New Amsterdam Theatre, and raised a total of $5,631,888. The top overall fundraiser was the Hamilton - And Peggy Tour with $434,841. The two runners up for largest fundraising totals were the Hamilton Angelica Tour and Moulin Rouge! The Musical, respectively.

== Broadway Bares ==
Broadway Bares is an annual burlesque show fundraiser for the organization, founded by Jerry Mitchell in 1992. Broadway dancers and actors perform striptease dances for the audience at Hammerstein Ballroom in New York City for two shows only in June. To date, Broadway Bares has raised more than $22.5 million.

The 2016 edition, On Demand, raised over $1.4 million. Participants included Lesli Margherita, Michael Longoria, Billy Porter, Christopher Sieber, Frankie J. Grande, Daniel Dae Kim, Frank DiLella, Roma Torre and more than 150 dancers.

The 2017 edition, "Strip U", raised more than $1.5 million. Participants included Lesli Margherita, Randy Rainbow, Allison Janney, and Judith Light.

The 2018 edition, "Game Night", raised more than $1.8 million on June 17, 2018. Celebrity performers included Matt Bomer, Zachary Quinto, Andrew Rannells, and Kirstin Maldonado, as well as 200 other dancers from 16 Broadway shows.

The 2019 edition, "Take Off", raised more than $2 million on June 16, 2019. Performers included Alex Newell, Billy Porter, and dancers from 16 Broadway shows.

The 2020 edition, "Broadway Bares: Zoom In", was held online, due to the ongoing pandemic. Even virtually, the event was able to raise $596,504 for the organization. The stream featured favorite strips from past seasons, with choreography by Denis Jones, Al Blackstone, Kellen Stancil, and more.

The 2021 edition, "Twerk from Home", raised $771,015. Harvey Fierstein made a special appearance with J. Harrison Ghee and Jelani Remy.

The 2022 edition returned for a live 30th anniversary celebration on Sunday, June 26, 2022, at Hammerstein Ballroom. The show featured appearances by Ariana DeBose, Ramin Karimloo, Julianne Hough, Suzy Nakamura, Julie White, Michael R. Jackson with performances by Nathan Lee Graham, Lesli Margherita, Bonnie Milligan, Maulik Pancholy and Jason Tam and dancers from the companies of Broadway's Aladdin, Beetlejuice, Company, Funny Girl, Hadestown, Hamilton, The Lion King, Moulin Rouge! The Musical, The Music Man, POTUS, A Strange Loop and Tina: The Tina Turner Musical.

On June 18, 2023, Broadway Bares: Pleasure Park raised $1,887,014. A burlesque twist on theme parks, 200 stars representing 14 Broadway shows danced to numbers that recalled Tron, Pandora, Prince Charming and drag queens. Special guests included Joanna "JoJo" Levesque, J. Harrison Ghee and Alex Newell.

== Broadway Flea Market and Grand Auction ==
Another major event that Broadway Cares sponsors is the Annual Flea Market and Grand Auction in Shubert Alley each September. The theatre community sells props, costumes and autographed memorabilia to raise money for Broadway Cares. The second part of the day features a live auction where bidders can win anything from a walk-on in a Broadway show, to lunch with a star, to a visit to the set of their favorite TV show. The event raised more than $17.5 million in its 36-year history.

On September 27, 2015, the 29th edition raised $756,655. Participating shows included Hamilton, Wicked, Finding Neverland, The Phantom of the Opera and Something Rotten!

In 2016, the 30th Annual Broadway Flea Market and Grand Auction raised a record $782,081 for Broadway Cares/Equity Fights AIDS. The Flea Market took place in Shubert Alley and West 44th and 45th Streets west of Times Square in Manhattan. Shows raising the most money were Hamilton, Wicked, School of Rock – The Musical and The Color Purple. Celebrities who attended include Jenna Ushkowitz, Melanie Moore, Victoria Justice, Ben Platt and Andy Mientus.

In 2017, the 31st Annual Broadway Flea Market and Grand Auction raised over one million dollars, $1,023,309 for Broadway Cares/Equity Fights AIDS. The Flea Market took place in Shubert Alley and West 44th and 45th Streets west of Times Square in Manhattan. Shows raising the most money were Natasha, Pierre & The Great Comet of 1812, Hamilton and Dear Evan Hansen. Celebrities who attended include Christy Altomare, Reed Birney, Stephanie J. Block, Laura Dreyfuss, Kimiko Glenn, Ann Harada, Rachel Bay Jones, Derek Klena, Andrew Keenan-Bolger, Lindsay Mendez, Javier Munoz, Laura Osnes, Bernadette Peters, Billy Porter, Will Roland, and Betsy Wolfe.

On September 30, 2018, the 32nd Annual Broadway Flea Market and Grand Auction raised $906,825. Mean Girls was named the top table. The most popular item was a musical phrase from Dear Evan Hansen signed by composers Benj Pasek and Justin Paul and original star Ben Platt. Celebrities in attendance included Erich Bergen, Nicolette Robinson, George Salazar. Kyle Selig, Ethan Slater and Will Roland.

On September 22, 2019, the 33rd Annual Broadway Flea Market and Grand Auction raised $870,167. The top fundraiser was the Association of Theatrical Press Agents and Managers followed by Broadway shows Hadestown, Beetlejuice, and Wicked. The most popular live auction lot was a day in the life at The Phantom of the Opera, including an onstage walk-on role, complete with a rehearsal and a costume and wig fitting.

On September 20, 2020, the 34th Annual Broadway Flea Market and Grand Auction went virtual, due to the ongoing pandemic, and raised $316,282. Interactive Online experiences included a live auction, a silent auction, one on one VIP meet and greets, special "flea market finds" and eBay "buy it now" bundles. Top prizes from the live auction included virtual Zoom meet and greets with Jonathan Groff, Bernadette Peters, Ben Platt, Sarah Jessica Parker, and Matthew Broderick.

On October 3, 2021, the 35th Annual Broadway Flea Market and Grand Auction returned to an in-person event and raised $753,321. Among the top bids during the auctions were lighting designer Jules Fisher’s 1973 Tony Award for Pippin, a virtual meet-and-greet with Patti LuPone and tickets to Company, and the typewriter Tom Hanks used in Broadway’s Lucky Guy.

The 36th annual Broadway Flea Market & Grand Auction was held September 25, 2022, and raised $1,043,825. The top fundraising tables represented ATPAM, Beetlejuice, Hadestown, The Music Man and The Phantom of the Opera. Kristin Chenoweth hosted her own Kristin’s Kloset, full of costumes and treasures she rescued from storage. The most popular auction lots celebrated The Phantom of the Opera: two VIP house seats to attend the 35th anniversary performance and an experience to sit in the orchestra pit and conduct the musical's exit music.

The 37th annual Broadway Flea Market & Grand Auction was held on October 1, 2023, and raised a record-breaking total of $1,237,179. The top fundraising included ATPAM, the Shubert Organization, Hadestown, TDF, Sweeny Todd, and the recently-closed The Phantom of the Opera. The grand live auction also broke the record of $381,450 previously held by 2017 with $493,500. The most popular experience up for auction was a business-class trip to London to see three West End shows and meet Broadway legends Lea Salonga and Bernadette Peters, selling for $32,000.

On September 22, 2024, the 38th annual Broadway Flea Market & Grand Auction raised a record-breaking $1,421,675.

== Broadway Backwards ==
Broadway Backwards is a yearly event that benefits Broadway Cares and The Lesbian, Gay, Bisexual and Transgender Community Center. The first performance was in 2006. The benefit puts a twist on male and female character songs from Broadway and off-Broadway shows. For example, in 2014, Kyle Dean Massey and Jose Llana performed "I Have Dreamed" from The King and I.

The 2014 benefit was held at the Al Hirschfeld Theatre on March 24. Raising $423,182, it was the most successful Broadway Backwards to date, surpassing 2013's record-breaking $347,060 raised at the Palace Theatre. The 2014 benefit was hosted by Julie White and Bebe Wood and included performances by Jonathan Groff, Andrew Keenan-Bolger, Beth Leavel, Norm Lewis, Billy Porter, and Andrew Rannells.

On March 9, 2015, the 10th anniversary event raised $466,717. It featured an all-male twist on "Cell Block Tango" from Chicago. It was hosted by Rob McClure and Julie Halston, and featured performances by Tituss Burgess, Florence Henderson, Telly Leung and Brian Stokes Mitchell.

On March 21, 2016, the 11th edition raised $480,287. Performers included Nick Adams, Krysta Rodriguez, Treat Williams, Lesli Margherita, Jay Armstrong Johnson and Chita Rivera.

On March 13, 2017, the 12th edition raised $522,870. Performers included Josh Groban, Cynthia Erivo, Santino Fontana and Bruce Vilanch.

On April 2, 2018, the 13th edition raised $680,273. Performers included Betsy Wolfe, Alex Newell and Taylor Trensch singing songs from Dear Evan Hansen, The Color Purple and The Greatest Showman.

On March 11, 2019, Broadway Backwards raised $704,491. The show at the New Amsterdam Theatre featured a cast of 130 performers including Gavin Creel, Darren Criss Bebe Neuwirth and Andrew Rannells. The show was hosted by Jenn Collela.

Postponed in 2020 due to the COVID-19 pandemic, an online edition of Broadway Backwards in March 2021 featured Stephanie J. Block, Jenn Colella, Deborah Cox, Jay Armstrong Johnson and Lea Salonga raised $749,555 for Broadway Cares and The Lesbian, Gay, Bisexual & Transgender Community Center in New York City.

Broadway Backwards returned to in person performances on May 23, 2022, raising $758,582. Jenn Colella returned as host at Disney's New Amsterdam Theatre. The show featured Matt Doyle and ensemble performing "Le Jazz Hot" from Victor/Victoria, J. Harrison Ghee and Z Infante performing "Impossible" from Rodgers and Hammerstein's Cinderella, Andrew Keenan-Bolger and company performing "He Plays the Violin" from 1776, Alexandra Billings performing "Mr. Cellophane" from Chicago and Bernadette Peters performing "Nothin Like a Dame" from South Pacific.

The 2023 edition raised a record-breaking $765,069. Jenn Colella returned as host. The show included Corbin Bleu performing "Mein Herr" from Cabaret, "Love Who You Love" from A Man of No Importance performed by Lea Salonga, "Maria" from West Side Story performed by Bonnie Milligan and "One Day More" from Les Misérables.

== Bucks County Cabaret ==
This yearly event is a one-night only concert held at Bucks County Playhouse in New Hope, Bucks County, Pennsylvania. It started in 2012, starring Bebe Neuwirth and Malcolm Gets. In 2013, Alan Cumming headlined the event which raised $165,750. In 2014, Linda Eder performed on and raised $131,650 for BC/EFA. In 2015, Lillias White was the event's headliner.

== Broadway Bears ==
"Broadway Bears" was a charity auction for BC/EFA in which teddy bears representing memorable characters from plays and musicals were auctioned to the highest bidder. The auctions raised $2,048,427 from 1998 to 2012, when the last of the 643 bears was auctioned off. Each teddy bear is outfitted in an original, handmade costume by Broadway's leading costume designers and many are signed by stars who have portrayed the roles represented or the creative teams behind the productions. For example, these bears included Anything Goes, signed by Sutton Foster; Billy Elliot The Musical, signed by Sir Elton John and Gregory Jbara; and Follies, signed by Danny Burstein, Jan Maxwell, Bernadette Peters, Ron Raines and Stephen Sondheim.

== COVID-19 ==
During the COVID-19 pandemic, Broadway Cares raised a record $18.1 million in the fiscal year ending September 30, 2020.

On March 17, 2020, just days into Broadway's shutdown, Broadway Cares launched its COVID-19 Emergency Assistance Fund, with an initial $250,000. The fund, administered by Actors' Fund of America, ensures thousands who work in theater and the performing arts receive lifesaving support. Within a week, more than 20 Broadway producers offered a $1 million challenge match to double the impact of donations to the fund. When that initial match was met, another group of producers offered a second $1 million match. In May, Bette Midler personally matched donations to the emergency fund up to $100,000.

The COVID-19 Emergency Assistance Fund has provided $6.5 million to Actors' Fund of America. An additional $1 million was shared with The Actors Fund to launch the Every Artist Insured program, expanding on The Actors Fund's free and confidential health insurance counseling and enrollment support services.

These pandemic-specific grants were in addition to annual support of the vital safety net of social services of The Actors Fund, including the HIV/AIDS Initiative, the Phyllis Newman Women's Health Initiative and The Friedman Health Center for the Performing Arts. In total, Broadway Cares awarded $11.2 million to Actors' Fund of America in fiscal year 2020, up from $6.2 million in 2019.

Since March 2021, Broadway Cares has awarded $18.95 million to The Actors Fund in support of its social service programs like the COVID-19 Emergency Relief Fund, Every Artist Insured, the HIV/AIDS Initiative, and The Friedman Health Center for the Performing Arts.

In February 2022, Broadway Cares awarded a record-breaking $2,532,500 in grants to 127 food service and meal delivery programs nationwide, surpassing the amount donated in 2021 and the pre-pandemic 2020 food grants.

During the pandemic, Broadway Cares held multiple Virtual Events including:

· On August 10, 2020, "Songs from an Unmade Bed" raised $111,159 to benefit Broadway Cares. Special guest hosts for the stream are Awkwafina, John Lithgow, John Cameron Mitchell, Billy Porter, Keala Settle with featured appearances by Maulik Pancholy and Bowen Yang.

· On October 29, 2020, "I Put a Spell on You" produced by and benefiting Broadway Cares raised $239,241. Jay Armstrong Johnson headline a virtual event, with Allison Robinson and Amanda Williams Ware. Guests include Nick Rashad Burroughs, Drew Gehling, J. Harrison Ghee, Todrick Hall, Robyn Hurder, Julia Mattison, Eva Noblezada, Ahmad Simmons, and Will Swenson, as well as drag stars Bob The Drag Queen, Kizha Carr, Marti Gould Cummings, Peachez, and Alexis Michelle.

· On December 1, 2020, on World AIDS Day, "Elgies For Angels, Punks and Raging Queens" raised $82,334 benefiting Broadway Cares. The full musical featured appearances from Lena Hall, Brooks Ashmanskas, Laura Bell Bundy, Norm Lewis.

· On December 15, 2020, "Home for the Holidays" produced by and benefitting Broadway Cares raised $126,141. The show was hosted and conceived by Jelani Remy. The lineup included Lena Hall, Casey Clark, Alan Cumming, Ed Dixon, Tovah Feldshuh, Victor Garber, Heather Headley, Ramin Karimloo, Karen Olivo.

· On January 26, 2021, Virtual Reading of "Three Hotels" by Jon Robin Baitz raised $113,299 benefiting Broadway Cares. The special presentation was performed by Two-time Emmy Award winner Bobby Cannavale and Academy Award winner Marisa Tomei and directed by two-time Tony Award nominee Moisés Kaufman.

· On February 11, 2021, the streaming of "ABC Daytime: Back on Broadway" produced by and benefiting Broadway Cares raised $130,565. The online event featured Susan Lucci, Kristen Alderson, Kathy Brier, Kassie DePaiva, Bobbie Eakes, Anthony Geary, Catherine Hickland, Finola Hughes, Cameron Mathison, Hillary B. Smith, Jason Tam and Brittany Underwood.

· On April 11, 2021, the one-year anniversary of "RWQuarantunes" raised $1,309,970 benefiting Broadway Cares. The virtual show featured the original Dreamgirls- Loretta Devine, Jennifer Holliday and Sheryl Lee Ralph, and Kristin Chenoweth, Stephanie Mills, Deborah Cox, Robert Cuccioli, Lena Hall, Joshua Henry, James Monroe Iglehart, Christopher Jackson, Nathan Lane, Bernadette Peters, and Lea Salonga.

· On August 14 and 15, 2021, "Broadway Cares Virtual 5k" raised $41,879.

· On October 28, 2021, The Annual "I Put a Spell on You" produced by and benefiting Broadway Cares raised $175,543. The cast included Jay Armstrong Johnson, Amanda Williams, Gavin Creel and more.

NBC's Primetime Special "One Night Only: The Best of Broadway"

On December 10, 2020, NBC's primetime special "One Night Only: The Best of Broadway" raised $3,263,848 to benefit Broadway Cares. The two-hour special was hosted by Mean Girls creator Tina Fey. The evening included special performances from the casts of Ain't Too Proud, Chicago, Jagged Little Pill, Diana: The Musical, Jersey Boys, Mean Girls, Rent and an appearance by the cast of Harry Potter and the Cursed Child. "One Night Only: The Best of Broadway" also featured performances by Kelly Clarkson, Brett Eldredge, Patti LaBelle and appearances from Annaleigh Ashford, Antonio Banderas, Lance Bass, Kristen Bell, Jesse Tyler Ferguson, Sutton Foster, Peter Gallagher, Josh Groban, Jake Gyllenhaal, Ron Cephas Jones, Camryn Manheim, Rob McClure, Alanis Morissette, Jerry O’Connell, Leslie Odom Jr., Mary-Louise Parker, John Stamos, Aaron Tveit, Blair Underwood and Susan Kelechi Watson.

== Broadway's Masked Singer ==
"Broadway's Masked Singer" is a charity event for BC/EFA based on Fox's The Masked Singer in which celebrities compete in head-to-toe costumes with face masks that conceal their identity. Eight various costumed Broadway stars competed against each other over the course of the event. The event was produced by the Broadway-Talk Live Network and featured a celebrity panel from various aspects of the theatre industry. There were three episodes that aired on Broadway Cares' YouTube channel through the week of April 26–30, 2021. Voting was handled through donations in the name of a contestant to Broadway Cares and at the end of each round, the competitor with the least amount in donations was unmasked and eliminated. It was hosted by Michael Hull and Dylan Bustamante and the panel throughout the episodes included Abby DePhillips, Ben Cameron, Christopher Metzger-Timson, Drew Wutke, Felicia Fitzpatrick, Hayley Podschun, Jackie Cox, Kevin Metzger-Timson, Natalie Weiss, Nick Cearly, Marissa Rosen, Marty Thomas, and Patrick Goodwin. Contestants for the first episode on April 26 included the Chicken, the Dalmatian, the Flamingo, and the Whale while contestants for the second episode on April 28 included the Bee, the Elephant, the Potato, and the Shark. Contestants for the finale on April 30 included the Bee, the Chicken, the Elephant, the Potato, and the Whale. The Whale (Nic Rouleau) was declared the winner and the Bee (Jelani Remy) was the runner-up. As of the finale on April 30, $11,623 was raised for the BC/EFA'S COVID-19 Emergency Assistance Fund.

=== Episode 1 (April 26) ===
Performances on the first episode
#	Stage name	First Song	Second Song	Identity	Result
1	Whale	"Writing's on the Wall" by Sam Smith	"Lost in the Woods" by Jonathan Groff	undisclosed	SAFE
2	Flamingo	"I'm Like a Bird" by Nelly Furtado	"Just a Girl" by No Doubt	Kate Rockwell	OUT
3	Dalmatian	"Love the Way You Lie (Part II)" by Rihanna ft. Eminem	"Spotlight" by Jennifer Hudson	Adrianna Hicks	OUT
4	Chicken	"Bad Guy" by Billie Eilish	"To Love You More" by Celine Dion	undisclosed	SAFE

=== Episode 2 (April 28) ===
Performances on the second episode
#	Stage name	First Song	Second Song	Identity	Result
1	Bee	"Under the Sea" by Samuel E. Wright	"Bring Him Home" from Les Misérables	undisclosed	SAFE
2	Shark	"Believe" by Cher	"I'll Be Loving You (Forever)" by New Kids on the Block	Patti Murin	OUT
3	Elephant	"Africa" by Toto	"Drivers License" by Olivia Rodrigo	undisclosed	SAFE
4	Potato	"You're the One That I Want" by John Travolta and Olivia Newton-John	"All About That Bass" by Meghan Trainor	undisclosed	SAFE

=== Episode 3 (April 30) - Finale ===
Performances on the third episode
#	Stage name	Song	Identity	Result
Round One
1	Potato	"1, 2 Step" by Ciara ft. Missy Elliott	Isabelle McCalla	OUT
2	Elephant	"Rainbow Connection" by Kermit the Frog	Nick Cearley	OUT
3	Chicken	"Call It What You Want" by Taylor Swift	undisclosed	SAFE
4	Bee	"Roll to Me" by Del Amitri	undisclosed	SAFE
5	Whale	"Something to Hold Onto" from Between the Lines	undisclosed	SAFE
Round Two
1	Chicken	"Unconditionally" by Katy Perry	Jessica Vosk	THIRD PLACE
2	Bee	"Because You Loved Me" by Celine Dion	Jelani Remy	RUNNER-UP
3	Whale	"You'll Be Back" by Jonathan Groff	Nic Rouleau	WINNER

== See also ==
- HIV/AIDS in the United States
