= Treatment of bipolar disorder =

Detailed analysis of management techniques for bipolar disorders

- Specialty: Psychiatry

The emphasis of the treatment of bipolar disorder is on effective management of the long-term course of the illness, which can involve treatment of emergent symptoms. Treatment methods include pharmacological and psychological techniques.

Bipolar disorder is a serious and debilitating mental health disorder, which causes patients to experience extreme highs and lows, such as mania and major depression.

== Principles ==
The use of psychotherapy to treat bipolar disorder has been found to reduce the relative risk of relapse at post-treatment (risk ratio=0.66) and follow-up time points (risk ratio=0.74).

Although treatment for bipolar disorder was once centered around medications called mood stabilizers, which are used to prevent or control episodes of mania or depression, the United Nations Special Rapporteur in the right to health has said,

[...] the dominance of the biomedical model to explain emotional distress has resulted in the overuse of medicalisation and institutionalisation, while ignoring the social, political or existential contexts that contribute to manifestations of mental distress.

Although the lifetime rate of suicide attempt in bipolar disorder is high (34%), guidelines for assessment of suicide risk are supported by evidence of "low" "overall strength". Although hospitalization was once a recommended practice, the United Nations' Committee on Rights of Persons with Disabilities recommends abolishing institutionalization and involuntary treatments "such as sedatives, mood stabilizers, electro-convulsive treatment, and conversion therapy".

Mood stabilisers
Treatment	NNT for depressive relapse	NNT for manic relapse	Efficacy in Acute Mania	Efficacy in Acute Depression	Common Side Effects	Serious Side Effects	Safety during pregnancy	Routes of Administration
Aripiprazole monotherapy	50	6.2	++	-	Weight gain, nausea, vomiting, constipation, akathisia, dizziness, extrapyramidal symptoms, headache, insomnia, sedation, tremor, blurred vision, anxiety, restlessness, fatigue	Seizure (0.1-0.3%), suicidal behaviour, blood clots (<1%), agranulocytosis, leukopenia (<1%), neutropenia(<1%), pancreatitis (<0.1%), metabolic syndrome, neuroleptic malignant syndrome, tardive dyskinesia, angioedema (<1%), rhabdomyolysis	Pregnancy Category: B3 (Au); C (US)	Oral, Intramuscular
Aripiprazole adjunct to lithium/valproate	33.3	10	++	-	As above	As above	As above	As above
Lamotrigine monotherapy	20.2	50.4	-	++/+	Rash, abdominal pain, indigestion, diarrhoea, nausea, vomiting, asthenia, ataxia, coordination problem, dizziness, headache, insomnia, sedation, tremor, vertigo, blurred vision, diplopia, anxiety, depression, dysmenorrhoea, rhinitis, pain	Erythema multiforme (<0.1%), Stevens–Johnson syndrome (0.08-0.8%), toxic epidermal necrolysis (0.08-0.8%), anaemia (<0.1%), Disseminated intravascular coagulation, Eosinophilia(<0.1%), Thrombocytopenia (<0.1%), Liver failure, Drug hypersensitivity syndrome, aseptic meningitis	Pregnancy Category: D (Au); C (US); Appears to have a lower propensity than carbamazepine, lithium and valproate for causing birth defects but can still cause birth defects	Mucous membranes, oral
Lithium monotherapy	6.1	4.4	++	++/+	Acne, hypothyroidism, weight gain, gastritis, xerostomia, nausea, leukocytosis, fine tremor, Hyperreflexia, Deep tendon, Nephrotoxicity, Polyuria, Potential sign of toxicity, Increased thirst, Potential sign of toxicity	Bradyarrhythmia (Severe), Brugada syndrome, Sinus node dysfunction, Transient reduction in peripheral circulation as a whole, Erythema multiforme, Ataxia, Potential sign of toxicity, Coma, Pseudotumor cerebri, Increased intracranial pressure and papilledema, Seizure, Blurred vision, Potential sign of toxicity, Tinnitus, Potential sign of toxicity, Giddiness, Potential sign of toxicity, Renal interstitial fibrosis, Angioedema	Pregnancy Category: D (Au); D (US); Risk of Ebstein's anomaly and other congenital heart defects.	Oral
Olanzapine monotherapy	17.2	4.4	+++	++/+	Orthostatic hypotension, Peripheral edema (3% to 6%), Hypercholesterolemia (up to 24%), Hyperglycemia (0.1% to 17.4%), Increased appetite (3% to 24%), Increased prolactin level (31.2% to 61.1%), Serum triglycerides raised (up to 40%), Weight gain, Constipation, Xerostomia, Akathisia, Asthenia, Dizziness, Sedation, Tremor, Personality disorder (8%), Accidental injury (4% to 12%)	Sudden cardiac death, Diabetic coma with ketoacidosis, Diabetic ketoacidosis, Hyperglycemic hyperosmolar state, Acute hemorrhagic pancreatitis, Venous thromboembolism, Immune hypersensitivity reaction, Cerebrovascular disease, Seizure (0.9% ), Status epilepticus, Suicidal intent (0.1% to 1% ), Pulmonary embolism	Pregnancy Category: C (Au) C (US)	Oral, intramuscular
Olanzapine adjunct to lithium/valproate	6.2	11.2	+++	-	As above	As above	As above	As above
Quetiapine monotherapy	3.3	2.4	++	+++	Orthostatic Hypertension, Tachycardia (0.5% to 7%), Serum cholesterol raised (7% to 18%), Serum triglycerides raised (8% to 22%), Weight gain (3% to 23%), Abdominal pain, Constipation, Increased appetite, Indigestion, Vomiting, Xerostomia, Increased liver enzymes, Backache, Asthenia, Dizziness, Extrapyramidal signs, Headache, Insomnia, Lethargy, Sedation, Tremor, Agitation (6% to 20%), Nasal congestion, Pharyngitis (4% to 6%), Fatigue, Pain	Syncope (0.3% to 1%), Diabetic ketoacidosis, Pancreatitis, Agranulocytosis, Leukopenia, Neutropenia (0.3%), Anaphylaxis, Seizure (0.05% to 0.5%), Tardive dyskinesia (0.1% to less than 5%), Suicidal thoughts, Priapism, Neuroleptic malignant syndrome (rare )	Pregnancy Category: B3 (Au) C (US)	Oral
Quetiapine plus lithium/valproate	5.9	7.1	+++/++	+++	As above	As above	As above	As above
Risperidone	4	36.4	+++	-	Rash, hyperprolactinaemia, weight gain, constipation, diarrhoea, excessive salivation, increased appetite, indigestion, nausea, vomiting, upper abdominal pain, dry mouth, extrapyramidal side effects, dizziness, sedation, akathisia, blurred vision, anxiety, cough, nasal congestion, nasopharyngitis, pain in throat, upper respiratory tract infection, fatigue and generalised pains	Prolonged QT interval, sudden cardiac death, syncope, diabetic ketoacidosis, hypothermia, pancreatitis, Agranulocytosis, Leukopenia, Neutropenia, Thrombocytopenia, Thrombotic thrombocytopenic purpura, stroke, seizure, tardive dyskinesia, priapism, pulmonary embolism, neuroleptic malignant syndrome	Pregnancy Category: B3 (Au) C (US)	Oral, Intramuscular
Risperidone plus treatment as usual	15.8	7.9	+++	-	As above	As above	As above	As Above
Valproate monotherapy	10.5	21.3	++/+	-	Abdominal pain, diarrhoea, indigestion, loss of appetite, nausea, vomiting, asthenia, dizziness, feeling nervous, headache, insomnia, sedation, tremor, Amblyopia, Blurred vision, Diplopia, infectious disease, influenza	Palpitation, tachycardia, hyperammonaemia, pancreatitis, thrombocytopaenia, liver failure, immune hypersensitivity reaction, hyperammonaemic encephalopathy, deafness	Pregnancy Category: D (Au) D (US) Has the highest propensity of all anticonvulsants for causing birth defects. Around 6-11% of children born to mothers that used the drug during pregnancy are born with birth defects.	Oral
Ziprasidone and treatment as usual	55.1	14.1	++/+	-	Rash, weight gain, constipation, diarrhoea, indigestion, nausea, vomiting, xerostomia, akathisia, anxiety, asthenia, extrapyramidal side effects, dizziness, headache, sedation, abnormal vision, respiratory tract infection	Prolonged QT interval, syncope, torsades de pointes, diabetes mellitus, hyperglycaemia, hyperprolactinaemia, dysphagia, bone marrow depression, neuroleptic malignant syndrome, seizure, tardive dyskinesia, priapism	Pregnancy Category: B3 (Au) C (US)	Oral, intramuscular

Legend:

- negligible/very low/clinically insignificant effect

+ weak effect

++ moderate-level effect

+++ strong effect

=== Regulatory status of mood stabilisers ===
Drug	FDA approved for acute mania/mixed episodes?	FDA approved for bipolar depression?	FDA approved for bipolar maintenance?	TGA approved for acute mania/mixed episodes?	TGA approved for bipolar depression?	TGA approved for bipolar maintenance?	MHRA approved for acute mania/mixed episodes?	MHRA approved for bipolar depression	MHRA approved for bipolar maintenance
Aripiprazole	Yes	No	Yes (as an adjunct, yes)	No	No	Yes	Yes	No	Yes (for mania prevention)
Asenapine	Yes	No	No	Yes	No	Yes	Yes	No	No
Carbamazepine	Yes	No	No	No	No	Yes	No	No	Yes
Cariprazine	Yes	Yes	No						
Haloperidol	No	No	No	Yes	No	No	No	No	No
Lamotrigine	No	No	Yes	No	No	Yes	No	No	Yes (depressive episodes)
Lithium	Yes	No	Yes	Yes	No	Yes	Yes	No	Yes
Olanzapine	Yes	No (yes when in conjunction with fluoxetine)	Yes	Yes	No	Yes (as an adjunct to valproate/lithium)	Yes	No	No
Quetiapine	Yes	Yes	Yes	Yes	Yes	Yes	Yes	Yes	Yes
Lurasidone		Yes							
Risperidone	Yes	No	Yes	Yes	No	Yes	Yes	No	No
Valproate	Yes	No	No	No	No	Yes	Yes	No	Yes
Ziprasidone	Yes	No	No (yes as adjunct)	Yes	No	No	No	No	No
Zuclopenthixol	No	No	No	Yes	No	No	No	No	No

== Mood stabilizers ==
=== Lithium salts ===
Lithium salts have been used for centuries as a first-line treatment for bipolar disorder. In ancient times, doctors would send their mentally ill patients to drink from "alkali springs" as a treatment. Although they were not aware of it, they were actually prescribing lithium, which was present in high concentration within the waters. The therapeutic effect of lithium salts appears to be entirely due to the lithium ion, Li^{+}.

Its exact mechanism of action is uncertain, although there are several possibilities such as inhibition of inositol monophosphatase, modulation of G proteins or regulation of gene expression for growth factors and neuronal plasticity. There is strong evidence for its effectiveness in acute treatment and prevention of recurrence of mania. It can also be effective in bipolar depression, although the evidence is not as strong. It is also effective in reducing the risk of suicide in patients with mood disorders.

Potential side effects from lithium include gastrointestinal upset, tremor, sedation, excessive thirst, frequent urination, cognitive problems, impaired motor coordination, hair loss, and acne. Excessive levels of lithium can be harmful to the kidneys, and increase the risk of side effects in general. As a result, kidney function and blood levels of lithium are monitored in patients being treated with lithium.

For maintenance treatment of bipolar disorder with lithium, a recent review concludes that the standard lithium serum level should be 0.6–0.8 mmol/L, with optional reduction to 0.4-0.6 mmol/L in case of good response but poor tolerance or an increase to 0.8-1.0 mmol/L in case of insufficient response and good tolerance. For the elderly, slightly lower lithium levels of 0.4-0.6 mmol/L are recommended, with the option to go up to 0.7 or 0.8 mmol/L at ages 65‐79, and up to a maximum of 0.7 mmol/L over age 80.

Lithium levels of 0.8-1.0 are effective for acute mania. For a faster onset of action, it is recommended to use an antipsychotic with evidence for treating mania.

Monitoring is generally more frequent when lithium is being initiated, and the frequency can be decreased once a patient is stabilized on a given dose. Thyroid hormones should also be monitored periodically, as lithium can increase the risk of hypothyroidism. There is a high baseline risk of hypothyroidism among BD patients regardless of the treatment used, so monitoring should also be extended to those on other medication. Those on lithium or quetiapine do show a statistically significant elevated risk over others.

Lithium has also been proven in clinical trials to prevent suicide in people with bipolar disorder. In addition to its effects on suicide, lithium also decreases all-cause mortality in people with bipolar disorder.

=== Anticonvulsants ===
A number of anti-convulsant drugs are used as mood stabilizers, and the suspected mechanism is related to the theory that mania can "kindle" further mania, similar to the kindling model of seizures. Valproic acid, or valproate, was one of the first anti-convulsants tested for use in bipolar disorder. It has proven to be effective for treating acute mania. The mania prevention and antidepressant effects of valproic acid have not been well demonstrated. Valproic acid is less effective than lithium at preventing and treating depressive episodes.

Carbamazepine was the first anti-convulsant shown to be effective for treating bipolar mania. It has not been extensively studied in bipolar depression. It is generally considered a second-line agent due to its side effect profile. Lamotrigine is considered a first-line agent for the treatment of bipolar depression. It is effective in preventing the recurrence of both mania and depression, but it has not proved useful in treating acute mania.

Zonisamide (trade name Zonegran), another anti-convulsant, also may show promise in treating bipolar depression. Various other anti-convulsants have been tested in bipolar disorder, but there is little evidence of their effectiveness. Other anti-convulsants effective in some cases and being studied closer include phenytoin, levetiracetam, pregabalin and valnoctamide.

Each anti-convulsant agent has a unique side-effect profile. Valproic acid can frequently cause sedation or gastrointestinal upset, which can be minimized by giving the related drug divalproex, which is available in an enteric-coated tablet. These side effects tend to disappear over time. According to studies conducted in Finland in patients with epilepsy, valproate may increase testosterone levels in teenage girls and produce polyendocrine metabolic ovarian syndrome (PMOS) in women who began taking the medication before age 20. Increased testosterone can lead to PMOS with irregular or absent menses, obesity, and abnormal growth of hair. Therefore, young female patients taking valproate should be monitored carefully by a physician. Excessive levels of valproate can lead to impaired liver function, and liver enzymes and serum valproate level, with a target of 50–125 μg/L, should be monitored periodically.

Side effects of carbamazepine include blurred vision, double vision, ataxia, weight gain, nausea, and fatigue, as well as some rare but serious side effects such as blood dyscrasias, pancreatitis, exfoliative dermatitis, and hepatic failure. Monitoring of liver enzymes, platelets, and blood cell counts are recommended.

Lamotrigine generally has minimal side effects, but the dose must be increased slowly to avoid rashes, including Stevens-Johnson syndrome (SJS) and exfoliative dermatitis.

=== Atypical antipsychotic drugs ===
Antipsychotics work best in the manic phase of bipolar disorder. Second-generation or atypical antipsychotics (including aripiprazole, olanzapine, quetiapine, paliperidone, risperidone, and ziprasidone) have emerged as effective mood stabilizers. The evidence for this is fairly recent, as in 2003 the American Psychiatric Press noted that atypical anti-psychotics should be used as adjuncts to other anti-manic drugs because their mood stabilizing properties had not been well established. The mechanism is not well known, but may be related to effects on glutamate activity. Several studies have shown atypical antipsychotics to be effective both as single-agent and adjunctive treatments. Antidepressant effectiveness varies, which may be related to different serotonergic and dopaminergic receptor binding profiles. Quetiapine and the combination of olanzapine and fluoxetine have both demonstrated effectiveness in bipolar depression.

In light of recent evidence, olanzapine (Zyprexa) has been FDA approved as an effective monotherapy for the maintenance of bipolar disorder. A head-to-head randomized control trial in 2005 has also shown olanzapine monotherapy to be just as effective and safe as lithium in prophylaxis.

The atypical antipsychotics differ somewhat in side effect profiles, but most have some risk of sedation, weight gain, and extrapyramidal symptoms (including tremor, stiffness, and restlessness). They may also increase the risk of metabolic syndrome, so metabolic monitoring should be performed regularly, including checks of serum cholesterol, triglycerides, and glucose, weight, blood pressure, and waist circumference. Taking antipsychotics for long periods or at high doses can also cause tardive dyskinesia — a sometimes incurable neurological disorder resulting in involuntary, repetitive body movements. The risk of tardive dyskinesia appears to be lower in second-generation antipsychotics than in first-generation antipsychotics but as with first-generation drugs, increases with time spent on medications and in older patients.

=== New treatments ===
A variety of other agents have been tried in bipolar disorder, including benzodiazepines, calcium channel blockers, L-methylfolate, and thyroid hormone. Modafinil (Provigil) and pramipexole (Mirapex) have been suggested for treating cognitive dysfunction associated with bipolar depression, but evidence supporting their use is quite limited. In addition, riluzole, a glutamatergic drug used in ALS has been studied as an adjunct or monotherapy treatment in bipolar depression, with mixed and inconsistent results. The selective estrogen receptor modulator medication tamoxifen has shown rapid and robust efficacy treating acute mania in bipolar patients. This action is likely due not to tamoxifen's estrogen-modulating properties, but due to its secondary action as an inhibitor of protein Kinase C.

=== Cognitive effects of mood stabilizers ===
Bipolar patients taking antipsychotics have lower scores on tests of memory and full-scale IQ than patients taking other mood stabilisers. Use of both typical and atypical antipsychotics is associated with risk of cognitive impairment, but the risk is higher for antipsychotics with more sedating effects.

Among bipolar patients taking anticonvulsants, those on lamotrigine have a better cognitive profile than those on carbamazepine, valproate, topiramate, and zonisamide.

Although decreased verbal memory and slowed psychomotor speed are common side effects of lithium use, these side effects usually disappear after discontinuation of lithium. Lithium may be protective of cognitive function in the long term since it promotes neurogenesis in the hippocampus and increases grey matter volume in the prefrontal cortex.

== Antidepressants ==
Antidepressants are used with caution in bipolar disorder, as they may not be effective and may even induce mania. They are generally not used alone, but may be considered as an adjunct to lithium.

A recent large-scale study found that severe depression in patients with bipolar disorder responds no better to a combination of antidepressant medications and mood stabilizers than it does to mood stabilizers alone and that antidepressant use does not hasten the emergence of manic symptoms in patients with bipolar disorder.

The concurrent use of an antidepressant and a mood stabilizer, instead of mood stabilizer monotherapy, may lower the risk of further bipolar depressive episodes in patients whose most recent depressive episode has been resolved. However, some studies have also found that antidepressants pose a risk of inducing hypomania or mania, sometimes in individuals with no prior history of mania. Saint John's Wort, a naturally occurring compound, is thought to function in a fashion similar to man-made antidepressants, and there are reports that suggest that it can also induce mania. For these reasons, some psychiatrists are hesitant to prescribe antidepressants for the treatment of bipolar disorder unless mood stabilizers have failed to have an effect, however, others feel that antidepressants still have an important role to play in treatment of bipolar disorder.

Side effects vary greatly among different classes of antidepressants.

Antidepressants are helpful in preventing suicides in people with bipolar disorder when they go in for the depressive phase.

== NMDA-receptor antagonists ==
A single intravenous dose of ketamine may produce a rapid but transient antidepressant effect in bipolar depression, although the evidence is of low to very low certainty, and evidence for other glutamate receptor modulators or for sustained remission and safety remains inconclusive.

== Dopamine agonists ==
In a single controlled study of twenty one patients, the dopamine D_{3} receptor agonist pramipexole was found to be highly effective in the treatment of bipolar depression. Treatment was initiated at 0.125 mg thrice daily and increased at a rate of 0.125 mg thrice daily to a limit of 4.5 mg per day until the patients' condition satisfactorily responded to the medication or they could not abide the side effects. The final average dosage was 1.7 mg ± 0.90 mg per day. The incidence of hypomania in the treatment group was no greater than in the control group.

== Psychotherapy ==
Certain types of psychotherapy, used in combination with medication, may provide some benefit in the treatment of bipolar disorders. Psychoeducation has been shown to be effective in improving patients' compliance with their lithium treatment. Evidence of the efficacy of family therapy is not adequate to support unrestricted recommendation of its use. There is "fair support" for the utility of cognitive therapy. Evidence for the efficacy of other psychotherapies is absent or weak, often not being performed under randomized and controlled conditions. Well-designed studies have found interpersonal and social rhythm therapy to be effective.

Although medication and psychotherapy cannot cure the illness, therapy can often be valuable in helping to address the effects of disruptive manic or depressive episodes that have hurt a patient's career, relationships or self-esteem. Therapy is available not only from psychiatrists but from social workers, psychologists and other licensed counselors.

== Jungian therapy ==
Jungian authors have likened the mania and depression of bipolar disorder to the Jungian archetypes 'puer' and 'senex'. The puer archetype is defined by the behaviors of spontaneity, impulsiveness, enthusiasm or mania and is symbolized by characters such as Peter Pan or the Greek god Hermes. The senex archetype is defined by behaviors of order, systematic thought, caution, and depression and is symbolized by characters such as the Roman god Saturn or the Greek god Kronos. Jungians conceptualize the puer and senex as a coexistent bipolarity appearing in human behavior and imagination, but in neurotic manifestations appears as extreme oscillations and as unipolar manifestations. In the case of the split puer-senex bipolarity the therapeutic task is to bring the puer and senex back into correlation by working with the patient's mental imagery."

== Lifestyle changes ==
=== Sufficient sleep ===
If sleeping is disturbed, the symptoms can occur. Sleep disruption may actually exacerbate the mental illness state. Those who do not get enough sleep at night, sleep late and wake up late, or go to sleep with some disturbance (e.g. music or charging devices) have a greater chance of having the symptoms and, in addition, depression. It is highly advised by psychiatric authorities to not sleep too late and to get enough high quality sleep.

=== Self-management and self-awareness ===
Understanding the symptoms, when they occur and ways to control them using appropriate medications and psychotherapy generally helps those diagnosed with bipolar disorder to lead a psychologically healthier life. Prodrome symptom detection has been shown to be used effectively to anticipate onset of manic episodes and requires close monitoring of bipolar symptoms. Because the offset of the symptoms is often gradual, even subtle mood changes and activity levels are monitored to help avoid a relapse. Maintaining a mood chart is a specific method used by patients and doctors to identify mood, environmental and activity triggers.

=== Stress reduction ===
Forms of stress may include having too much to do, too much complexity and conflicting demands among others. There are also stresses that come from the absence of elements such as human contact, a sense of achievement, constructive creative outlets, and occasions or circumstances that will naturally elicit positive emotions. Stress reduction will involve reducing things that cause anxiety and increasing those that generate happiness. It is not enough to just reduce the anxiety.

=== Co-morbid substance use disorder ===
Co-occurring substance misuse disorders, which are extremely common in bipolar patients, can cause a significant worsening of bipolar symptomatology and can cause the emergence of affective symptoms. The treatment options and recommendations for substance use disorders is wide but may include certain pharmacological and nonpharmacological treatment options.

=== The role of cannabinoids ===
Acute cannabis intoxication transiently produces perceptual distortions, psychotic symptoms and reduction in cognitive abilities in healthy persons and in severe mental disorder, and may impair the ability to safely operate a motor vehicle.

Cannabis use is common in bipolar disorder; and is a risk factor for a more severe course of the disease by increasing frequency and duration of episodes. It is also reported to reduce age at onset.

== Other treatments ==
=== Omega-3 fatty acids ===
Omega-3 fatty acids may also be used as a treatment for bipolar disorder, particularly as a supplement to medication. An initial clinical trial by Stoll et al. produced positive results. However, since 1999, attempts to confirm this finding of beneficial effects of omega-3 fatty acids in several larger double-blind clinical trials have produced inconclusive results. It was hypothesized that the therapeutic ingredient in omega-3 fatty acid preparations is eicosapentaenoic acid (EPA) and that supplements should be high in this compound to be beneficial. A 2008 Cochrane systematic review found limited evidence to support the use of Omega-3 fatty acids to improve depression but not mania as an adjunct treatment for bipolar disorder.

Omega-3 fatty acids may be found in fish, fish oils, algae, and to a lesser degree in other foods such as flaxseed, flaxseed oil and walnuts. Although the benefits of Omega-3 fatty acids remain debated, they are readily available at drugstores and supermarkets, relatively inexpensive, and have few known side effects. (All of these oils, however, have the capacity to exacerbate GERD—food sources may be a good alternative in such cases.)

=== Exercise ===
Exercise has also been shown to have antidepressant effects, and as result it has been proposed as a treatment for bipolar disorder as well.

People with bipolar disorder generally exercise a lot less than those without, commonly falling short of the minimum healthy exercise dose recommended by the American College of Sports Medicine (150 min/week of moderate aerobic activity or 60 min/week of vigorous activity). As an intervention for bipolar disorder, exercise has clear benefits for physical comorbidities such as increased body mass and decreased cardiovascular fitness.

Results for the mental symptoms of bipolar disorder is weaker. In aggregate, studies report a positive effect on depressive symptoms, general functioning, and quality of life, though this includes many showing no effect. In some cases, exercise appears to correct brain structure abnormalities without measurably improving the symptoms.

Some literature supports a concern that vigorous exercise may provoke mania, so it is recommended to limit one to moderate exercise out of precaution. The cause-effect relationship between vigorous exercise and mania is very poorly understood: while some patients report becoming more active following exercise, others found it providing a calming effect that helps fight hypomanic symptoms.

=== Electroconvulsive therapy ===
Electroconvulsive therapy (ECT) may have some effectiveness in mixed mania states, and good effectiveness in bipolar depression, particularly in the presence of psychosis. It may also be useful in the treatment of severe mania that is non-responsive to medications.

The most frequent side effects of ECT include memory impairment, headaches, and muscle aches. In some instances, ECT can produce significant and long-lasting cognitive impairment, including anterograde amnesia, and retrograde amnesia.

=== Ketogenic diet ===
Because many of the medications that are effective in treating epilepsy are also effective as mood stabilizers, it has been suggested that the ketogenic diet—used for treating pediatric epilepsy—could have mood stabilizing effects. Ketogenic diets are diets that are high in fat and low in carbohydrates, and force the body to use fat for energy instead of sugars from carbohydrates. This causes a metabolic response similar to that seen in the body during fasting. This idea has not been tested by clinical research, and until recently, was entirely hypothetical. Recently, however, two case studies have been described where ketogenic diets were used to treat bipolar II. In each case, the patients found that the ketogenic diet was more effective for treating their disorder than medication and were able to discontinue the use of medication. The key to efficacy appears to be ketosis, which can be achieved either with a classic high-fat ketogenic diet, or with a low-carbohydrate diet similar to the induction phase of the Atkins Diet. The mechanism of action is not well understood. It is unclear whether the benefits of the diet produce a lasting improvement in symptoms (as is sometimes the case in treatment for epilepsy) or whether the diet would need to be continued indefinitely to maintain symptom remission.

== See also ==
- Depression and Bipolar Support Alliance
- Suicide prevention
- International Society for Bipolar Disorders
