= ISBD =

ISBD may stand for:

- International Society for Bipolar Disorders, a nonprofit organization for bipolar disorder
- International Standard Bibliographic Description
