= List of Sanjay and Craig episodes =

Sanjay and Craig is an American animated sitcom produced by Nickelodeon. The series premiered on May 25, 2013. The series follows the adventures of a human boy named Sanjay and his best friend, a talking snake named Craig. On a promotional webpage for the show, the network explains that Sanjay and Craig's suburban hijinks require that "no one finds out that Craig can talk."

On September 12, 2013, Sanjay and Craig was renewed for a second season by Nickelodeon and it premiered on July 12, 2014 and ended on October 9, 2015.

On June 11, 2014, Sanjay and Craig was renewed for a third and final season by Nickelodeon and it premiered on September 7, 2015 and ended on July 29, 2016.

== Series overview ==
Season	Segments	Episodes	Original air date	
Season	Segments	Episodes	First aired	Last aired
1	39	20	May 25, 2013	July 19, 2014
2	38	20	July 12, 2014	October 9, 2015
3	37	20	September 7, 2015	July 29, 2016

== Episodes ==
=== Pilot (2012) ===
Title	Directed by	Written by	Prod. code
"Sanjay and Craig: Kung-Fu Catapult"	Sean Szeles	James Dirschberger, Jay Howell, Dani Michaeli, & Andreas Trolf	SC000
During a game of Safari Food Fight with Megan Sparkles, Sanjay Patel and Craig Slithers realize they're underpowered and must find a weapon. They then ask Remington Tufflips for help, where he'll only give them his catapult if they rid his trailer of ghosts. This pilot would later be reworked the Season 1 episode "Kung-Fu Catapult". The pilot version has some differences from the overall series, such as Megan's design and Craig originally born as an ordinary snake that was given the ability to speak from being zapped by Sanjay using Vijay's ray gun. In addition, Vijay and Darlene, as well as Sandy and Scabs, make appearances in the original pilot version, with Darlene originally being voiced by Hari Leigh.

=== Season 1 (2013–14) ===
No. overall	No. in season	Title	Storyboard director(s)	Written by	Storyboard by	Original release date	Prod. code	U.S. viewers (millions)
1a	1a	"Brett Venom M.D."	Blake Lemons	Neil Graf, Blake Lemons & Chris Viscardi	Abe Audish, Neil Graf & M.J. Sandhe	May 25, 2013	SC103	3.56
Sanjay and Craig, upon hearing that Sanjay's mother is about to help in a "butt transplant", try to sneak into the hospital to view it. They disguise themselves as doctors and discover that the patient is Mr. Noodman, their neighbor who is terrified of snakes (Craig is a snake) and he then causes panic throughout the hospital before Sanjay's mother successfully completes the surgery.
1b	1b	"Laugh Quake"	Carl Faruolo	Carl Faruolo, Bryan Mann & Chris Viscardi	Bryan Mann, Jim Shellhorn & Kris Wimberly	May 25, 2013	SC101	3.56
Sanjay and Craig both find their laughs are annoying, so they go to a comedy club in an attempt to find a more pleasing laugh.
2a	2a	"Maximum Dennis"	Matt Layzell & Tom Parkinson	Matt Layzell, Tom Parkinson & Andreas Trolf	Bryan Mann	June 1, 2013	SC104	3.07
The boys disguise themselves as Maximum Dennis at the Frycade, where they intend to beat Tyson at arcade and wing-eating records.
2b	2b	"Dog Wave"	Madeline Queripel	Madeline Queripel & Chris Viscardi	Bryan Mann	June 1, 2013	SC108	3.07
The boys want a dog, but wind up with 100 dogs. Trouble then ensues when Noodman calls the pound.
3a	3a	"Heightmare"	Matt Layzell & Tom Parkinson	Jim Dirschberger, Matt Layzell & Tom Parkinson	TBA	June 8, 2013	SC112	2.46
Sanjay is finally tall enough to ride what he believes to be the scariest ride at the carnival but he feels he may not be able to go through with it.
3b	3b	"Be Like Tufflips"	Tom King Jr.	Abe Audish, Tom King Jr. & Andreas Trolf	Abe Audish & Jim Shellhorn	June 8, 2013	SC110	2.46
Sanjay is mistaken for his hero when he dresses up as Remington Tufflips, and he gets all of his advantages of being him.
4a	4a	"Stinkboy"	Ryan Crego & Tom King	Ryan Crego, Tom King, Will McRobb & M.J. Sandhe	M.J. Sandhe & Kris Wimberly	June 22, 2013	SC102	2.99
Sanjay runs away to live in the sewer when even Craig can't handle his stench.
4b	4b	"Wolfie"	Carl Faruolo	Greg Araya, Carl Faruolo & Andreas Trolf	Greg Araya	June 22, 2013	SC109	2.99
Hector's sudden fascination with wolves gets on Sanjay and Craig's nerves.
5a	5a	"Traffical Island"	Matt Layzell & Tom Parkinson	Matt Layzell, Tom Parkinson & Joe Stillman	Bryan Mann	June 29, 2013	SC114	2.91
Sanjay strands his pals on a highway median and everyone gets upset during the experience.
5b	5b	"Partybot"	Blake Lemons	Neil Graf, Blake Lemons & Joe Stillman	Neil Graf & Bryan Mann	June 29, 2013	SC106	2.91
Sanjay and Craig become party animals at the Dicksons' place when they bring an old robot invented by Vijay, but chaos ensues when the Partybot goes too far.
6a	6a	"The Giving G"	Madeline Queripel	Will McRobb & Madeline Queripel	Bryan Mann	July 13, 2013	SC105	2.96
The boys find a giant gorilla balloon at the dump that used to belong to "Big G Tires" which suddenly ends up at the Dicksons' house.
6b	6b	"Release the Craigan"	Blake Lemons	Blake Lemons & Sasha Stroman	Neil Graf & Bryan Mann	July 13, 2013	SC117	2.96
When Craig steals Megan's identity, he becomes a beauty pageant queen, making Megan depressed.
7a	7a	"Muscle C.O.P.S."	Carl Faruolo	Carl Faruolo & Andreas Trolf	Greg Araya & Bryan Mann	September 14, 2013	SC116	2.38
Sanjay and Craig grow giant muscles, join an unusual police force known as the Muscle C.O.P.S. and learn a valuable lesson on teamwork.
7b	7b	"Cold Hard Cash"	Tom Parkinson	Jim Dirschberger & Tom Parkinson	Bryan Mann	September 14, 2013	SC115	2.38
Sanjay and Craig race Baby Richard Dickson to free a 100-dollar bill frozen in ice.
8a	8a	"Unbarfable"	Sean Charmatz	Sean Charmatz & Chris Viscardi	Bryan Mann	September 21, 2013	SC120	3.06
When Sanjay and Craig learn that Hector has never barfed in his entire life, they try various attempts to make him puke.
8b	8b	"Game On"	Tom King	Tom King & Joe Stillman	Abe Audish, Bryan Mann & Jim Shellhorn	September 21, 2013	SC118	3.06
Sanjay and Craig's favorite arcade game, Tufflips Thumbs-Up Karate, is mysteriously gone from the Frycade.
9a	9a	"Laked Nake"	Blake Lemons	Neil Graf, Blake Lemons & Sasha Stroman	Neil Graf & Bryan Mann	October 5, 2013	SC121	2.85
Sanjay loses his bathing suit while at the lake and Tyson tries to humiliate him.
9b	9b	"Doom Baby"	Tom King	Abe Audish, Tom King, Bryan Mann & Will McRobb	Abe Audish & Bryan Mann	October 5, 2013	SC113	2.85
Sanjay and Craig are forced to baby-sit Richard Dickson who sneaks into Noodman's house.
10a	10a	"Blackout"	Tom Parkinson	Will McRobb & Tom Parkinson	Bryan Mann	October 19, 2013	SC122	2.79
Sanjay tries to give an electric charger to his mother during a blackout but everyone else wants it.
10b	10b	"Family Re-Noodman"	Carl Faruolo	Greg Araya, Carl Faruolo & Andreas Trolf	Greg Araya & Bryan Mann	October 19, 2013	SC119	2.79
The boys sneak into Noodman's family reunion to sample a new Frycade wing recipe.
11a	11a	"Fart Baby"	Carl Faruolo	Greg Araya, Carl Faruolo & Joe Stillman	Greg Araya & Bryan Mann	November 2, 2013	SC127	2.47
After holding a fart in to avoid farting in front of Belle, the fart bubble gets stuck inside Sanjay and he and Craig decide to be the proud parents of the bubble.
11b	11b	"Kung-Fu Catapult"	Tom King & Sean Szeles	Abe Audish, Jim Dirschberger, Jay Howell, Tom King, Dani Michaeli, Sean Szeles & Andreas Trolf	Abe Audish & Bryan Mann	November 2, 2013	SC107	2.47
After playing Safari Food Fight with Megan, Sanjay and Craig discover a haunted trailer and agree to rid Tufflip's trailer, haunted by ghosts in search for a catapult. Note: This episode is essentially the pilot, but with changes to the overall animation style and new, changed, and removed scenes, but the overall plot stayed the same.
12a	12a	"Trouble Dare"	Blake Lemons	Jim Dirschberger, Neil Graf & Blake Lemons	Neil Graf & Bryan Mann	November 16, 2013	SC124	3.24
Sanjay and Craig accidentally infest the house with an ant farm and decide to stay in a trailer. Unfortunately, the Dicksons are staying in it, so they have to play against them in a Family Double Dare game show. Special guest stars: Marc Summers and John Harvey as themselves.
12b	12b	"Road Pizza"	Tom Parkinson	George Gendi, Tom Parkinson & Joe Stillman	George Gendi & Bryan Mann	November 16, 2013	SC123	3.24
Craig gets possessed by an evil pizza demon named King Za.
13a	13a	"You're in Trouble"	Ryan Crego	Ryan Crego & Sasha Stroman	Bryan Mann, Scott O'Brien & Howie Perry	December 7, 2013	SC125	2.85
The gang go to the Tufflips camp. But Sanjay and Craig decide to not drink for the journey to avoid wetting the bed during the night.
13b	13b	"Cup O'Universe"	Mike Bell	Abe Audish, Mike Bell & Joe Stillman	Abe Audish & Bryan Mann	December 7, 2013	SC128	2.85
The kids are convinced that there is a universe in an old milkshake cup.
14a	14a	"Booger Johnson"	Carl Faruolo	Greg Araya, Carl Faroulo & Andreas Trolf	Greg Araya & Bryan Mann	February 22, 2014	SC130	2.85
Megan forces Sanjay to take care of her pet gerbil, Booger Johnson, while she's away. But since Craig has an appetite for gerbils, Sanjay tries to get him to see Booger Johnson as a friend.
14b	14b	"Dream Rangers"	Casey Alexander	Casey Alexander, Zeus Cervas, Jim Dirschberger & Chris Viscardi	Zeus Cervas & Bryan Mann	February 22, 2014	SC129	2.85
Sanjay and Craig must re-enter their dream to rescue Belle from Noodman.
15a	15a	"Prickerbeast"	Tom Parkinson	George Gendi, Will McRobb & Tom Parkinson	George Gendi & Bryan Mann	March 1, 2014	SC132	2.98
Sanjay, Craig, Hector, and Megan are lied to by their parents about the urban legend of the Prickerbeast, so they decide to get back at them by disguising themselves as the Prickerbeast.
15b	15b	"Day of the Snake"	Blake Lemons	Neil Graf, Blake Lemons & Joe Stillman	Neil Graf & Bryan Mann	March 1, 2014	SC131	2.98
Craig lies to Sanjay about what his day is like while Sanjay is away at school.
16a	16a	"Old Farts"	Toby Jones	Nick Bachman, Toby Jones & Sasha Stroman	Nick Bachman & Bryan Mann	March 8, 2014	SC134	2.76
After finding out that seniors get free wings at the Frycade, Sanjay and Craig disguise themselves as seniors.
16b	16b	"Kerplunk'd"	Mike Bell	Abe Audish, Mike Bell, Jim Dirschberger, Bryan Mann & Chris Viscardi	Abe Audish & Bryan Mann	March 8, 2014	SC133	2.76
Sanjay and Craig plan on starting a web-show where they prank others, based on Raska's hit web-show. Problems arise and a prank war breaks out between Sanjay and Craig and Raska. Special guest stars: Adam DeVine as Raska Boosh.
17a	17a	"Flip Flopas"	Blake Lemons	Neil Graf, Blake Lemons & Andreas Trolf	Neil Graf & Bryan Mann	March 15, 2014	SC135	3.26
The kids find some rare candies at Hector's house known as Flip Flopas, but when they discover a trick behind the candies, they seek an antidote. Special guest stars: Sam Lavagnino as Munchie.
17b	17b	"Chill Bill"	Carl Faruolo	Greg Araya, Carl Faruolo, Jay Howell & Chris Viscardi	Greg Araya & Bryan Mann	March 15, 2014	SC136	3.26
When the boys come across an underground convenience store known as "Eezy P-Eezy," they soon meet Chill Bill, an electric bass player. Craig soon starts hanging out with Chill Bill, making Sanjay jealous. Special guest stars: Michael-Leon Wooley as Chill Bill.
18a	18a	"Curb Dawgz"	Tom Parkinson	George Gendi, Tom Parkinson & Andreas Trolf	George Gendi & Bryan Mann	March 22, 2014	SC126	2.57
Sanjay, Craig and Hector, the "Curb Dawgz", disguise themselves as rad skateboarders named SanCraig and HotDog Everblades, hoping to join a skateboarding crew.
18b	18b	"Susan Loogie"	Mike Bell & Blake Lemons	Abe Audish, Mike Bell, Jim Dirschberger & Blake Lemons	Abe Audish, Nick Bachman & Bryan Mann	March 22, 2014	SC137	2.57
Megan disguises herself as a tomboy named Susan Loogie to convince Sanjay to be her dance partner.
19a	19a	"Pretty in Punk"	Jim Dirschberger & Jay Howell	Jim Dirschberger, Jay Howell & Sasha Stroman	Jim Dirschberger, Carl Faruolo & Jay Howell	July 12, 2014 (Note: This episode first aired on June 8, 2014 in Greece.)	SC111	N/A
The Dicksons' band is transformed into a sappy pop band by a music agent named Johnny Pounds for the worse thanks to Sanjay and Craig's desire to help them make money to replace an amplifier they accidentally broke.
19b	19b	"Hot Sauce Boss"	Tom Parkinson	George Gendi, Will McRobb, Tom Parkinson & Chris Viscardi	Nathan Bulmer, Bryan Mann & Tom Parkinson	July 19, 2014 (Note: This episode first aired on June 8, 2014 in Greece.)	SC138	2.23
When Chicken Chuck is revealed puts his own tangy sauce in the Frycade wings and is kicked out alongside Sanjay and Craig for defending him, they decide to start their own wing truck thus starting a competition with the Frycade.
20	20	"A Tail of Two Slithers"	Carl Faruolo & Blake Lemons	Greg Araya, Carl Faruolo, Neil Graf, Blake Lemons, Will McRobb & Chris Viscardi	Greg Araya, Nick Bachman, Neil Graf & Bryan Mann	May 16, 2014	SC139/140	2.67
Craig reunites with his long-lost brother, Ronnie, and decides to spend a week at his place but discovers he owns a shovel factory designed to kill snakes. Meanwhile, Ronnie uses devious methods to break-up Sanjay and Craig. When Sanjay discovers that Craig isn't happy with Ronnie and sneaks into the factory to get back Craig, Ronnie and his security try to stop them by using shovels, but when Sanjay and Craig tells Ronnie he doesn't have to be under the impression he is a human man, Ronnie admits his faults and escapes with Sanjay and Craig alone, Ronnie decides to return to the pet store to start a new life and Craig opens up to Sanjay's parents and tells them that he can talk, but they knew he could talk a long time ago.

=== Season 2 (2014–15) ===
No. overall	No. in season	Title	Storyboard director(s)	Written by	Storyboard by	Original release date	Prod. code	U.S. viewers (millions)
21a	1a	"Boatin' Down the River"	Neil Graf	Nick Bachman, Jim Dirschberger, Neil Graf & Jay Howell	Nick Bachman, Nathan Bulmer & Neil Graf	July 12, 2014	SC202	N/A
The children set off to find mysterious castaways that are stranded on an island shaped like a butt.
21b	1b	"Ghost Pool"	Abe Audish	Abe Audish, Neil Graf, Bryan Mann, Will McRobb & Chris Viscardi	Abe Audish, Nathan Bulmer, Aminder Dhaliwal & Bryan Mann	July 19, 2014	SC201	2.23
The gang sets off to find a legendary pool in the forest with Belle babysitting to prove they are not babies.
22a	2a	"Shirts Off"	Carl Faruolo	Greg Araya, Carl Faruolo, Jim Dirschberger, Jay Howell & Derek Iversen	Greg Araya, Nathan Bulmer & Carl Faruolo	July 26, 2014	SC204	1.63
Sanjay and Craig experience freedom when they are shirtless.
22b	2b	"Middle Shame"	Blake Lemons	Jim Dirschberger, Blake Lemons, Bryan Mann & Dani Michaeli	Nathan Bulmer, Blake Lemons & Bryan Mann	July 26, 2014	SC203	1.63
Craig helps Sanjay to reveal his goofy middle name.
23b	3a	"Dolled Up"	Tom Parkinson	Abe Audish, Will McRobb, Dani Michaeli & Tom Parkinson	Abe Audish & Nathan Bulmer	August 2, 2014	SC205	1.74
Sanjay goes to great lengths to conceal that he and Craig were using Darlene's makeup kit.
23a	3b	"Space Race"	Matt Layzell	Aminder Dhaliwal, Grant Falardeau & Matt Layzell	Nathan Bulmer & Aminder Dhaliwal	August 2, 2014	SC206	1.74
Sanjay takes credit on Craig's invention and Craig goes to top him off with another invention.
24a	4a	"Barfy's Babies"	Neil Graf	Nick Bachman, Neil Graf & Dani Michaeli	Nick Bachman & Nathan Bulmer	September 20, 2014	SC207	2.25
Sanjay and Craig try to find something Barfy's new baby is good at.
24b	4b	"Butts Up"	Blake Lemons	Derek Iversen, Blake Lemons & Bryan Mann	Nathan Bulmer & Bryan Mann	September 20, 2014	SC208	2.25
Sanjay meets a girl named Sam, and helps her win a "Butts Up" game against Noodman.
25a	5a	"Screamday"	Abe Audish	Abe Audish, Aminder Dhaliwal & Derek Iversen	Nathan Bulmer & Aminder Dhaliwal	September 27, 2014	SC211	1.79
Craig loses his voice while screaming too much, so Sanjay, Megan, and Hector must get it back.
25b	5b	"Enter Sandman"	Neil Graf	Nick Bachman, Jim Dirschberger, Neil Graf & Derek Iversen	Nick Bachman & Nathan Bulmer	September 27, 2014	SC212	1.79
The Dicksons invite Sanjay and Craig over, only to discover that their lives are totally different than their lives.
26	6	"Remington Tufflips' Spooky Trailer of Cartoons"	Carl Faruolo & Tom Parkinson	Greg Araya, Jim Dirschberger, Josh Engel, Carl Faruolo, Jay Howell, Will McRobb, Tom Parkinson & Chris Viscardi	Greg Araya, Josh Engel & Nathan Bulmer	October 18, 2014	SC209/210	1.82
Tufflips tells 5 Halloween stories in this episode. They are "Eye Scream", "Haus of Vings", "Haunted Milk", "Hook'd" and "Poultrygeist".
27a	7a	"Alien Craig"	Blake Lemons	Blake Lemons, Bryan Mann & Chris Viscardi	Nathan Bulmer & Bryan Mann	October 4, 2014	SC213	1.77
When Sanjay forgets to take out the garbage, a trip to the dump turns into a journey of galactic proportions.
27b	7b	"Googas"	Carl Faruolo	Greg Araya, Grant Falardeau & Carl Faruolo	Greg Araya & Nathan Bulmer	October 4, 2014	SC214	1.77
The kids are desperate to get the most popular toy in town, but their attempts are thwarted by the snobby Benji Warlin. Guest star: Paul Reubens as Benji Warlin
28a	8a	"Glory Hounds"	Abe Audish	Abe Audish, Aminder Dhaliwal, Grant Falardeau & Will McRobb	Aminder Dhaliwal & Nathan Bulmer	October 11, 2014	SC216	2.38
The boys get Megan kicked out of her prestigious club for winners.
28b	8b	"Glad to Be Sad"	Tom Parkinson	Josh Engel, Derek Iversen & Tom Parkinson	Nathan Bulmer & Josh Engel	October 11, 2014	SC215	2.38
Sanjay and Craig hear a sad song that makes them feel better.
29a	9a	"TuffCon"	Neil Graf	Nick Bachman, Grant Falardeau, Neil Graf & Derek Iversen	Aminder Dhaliwal & Nathan Bulmer	November 1, 2014	SC217	2.26
Sanjay meets his favorite movie villain, but finds the actor to be devious in reality.
29b	9b	"Pet Parents"	Blake Lemons	Aminder Dhaliwal, Grant Falardeau, Blake Lemons & Bryan Mann	Nathan Bulmer, Aminder Dhaliwal & Bryan Mann	November 1, 2014	SC218	2.26
Sanjay and Craig find a way to hypnotize Darlene and Vijay.
30a	10a	"2 Tuff 2 Watch"	Tom Parkinson	Jim Dirschberger, Josh Engel & Tom Parkinson	Nathan Bulmer & Josh Engel	November 15, 2014	SC220	1.97
The kids host an overnight Tufflips movie marathon in order to save a reptile refuge, but have trouble staying awake during it.
30b	10b	"Cuddle Buddy"	Carl Faruolo	Carl Faruolo, George Gendi, Derek Iversen & Blake Lemons	Nathan Bulmer & George Gendi	November 15, 2014	SC219	1.97
Craig longs to be cuddled after seeing the other neighborhood pets receiving affection.
31a	11a	"Ting"	Abe Audish	Abe Audish, Grant Falardeau & Jonny Van Orman	Nathan Bulmer & Jonny Van Orman	November 22, 2014	SC221	1.88
The children try to imagine the purpose of a mysterious object.
31b	11b	"Fartwerk"	Neil Graf	Nick Bachman, Neil Graf & Jay Howell	Nick Bachman & Nathan Bulmer	November 22, 2014	SC222	1.88
Sanjay and Craig seek to create a symphony of farts, and one person holds the one they desperately need: Noodman.
32a	12a	"Rash Thrash"	Bryan Mann	Aminder Dhaliwal, Blake Lemons, Bryan Mann & Sheela Shrinivas	Aminder Dhaliwal & Nathan Bulmer	April 5, 2015	SC223	1.06
Sanjay finds out to be allergic to Craig, only to find out the cure is wing sauce.
32b	12b	"Fowl Work"	Sarah Oleksyk	Gina Gress, Derek Iversen, Matt Layzell & Sarah Oleksyk	Dodge Greenley & Gina Gress	April 5, 2015	SC229	1.06
Sanjay and Craig must keep Belle's after work partying a secret from Penny.
33a	13a	"Wild Buds"	Tom Parkinson	Tom Parkinson, Grant Falardeau, Derek Iversen & Josh Engel	Josh Engel & Dodge Greenley	April 12, 2015	SC225	1.13
Sanjay and Craig make a bet about who can survive in the wild longer.
33b	13b	"Depants Tag"	Abe Audish	Abe Audish, Lauren Palmigiano & Jonny Van Orman	Dodge Greenley & Jonny Van Orman	April 12, 2015	SC226	1.13
The town plays a game involving pantsing people for a grand prize.
34a	14a	"Ew De Hector"	George Gendi	Grant Falardeau, George Gendi & Paul Layzell	Nathan Bulmer & Paul Layzell	July 18, 2015	SC224	0.87
Hector sells his sweat as cologne.
34b	14b	"King of Kids"	Tom Parkinson	Josh Engel, Will McRobb, Lauren Palmigiano & Tom Parkinson	Josh Engel & Dodge Greenley	July 18, 2015	SC230	0.87
Sanjay and Craig meet a group of young children who idolize the duo.
35a	15a	"Romper Chomper"	Abe Audish	Abe Audish, Will McRobb, Lauren Palmigiano & Jonny VanOrman	Dodge Greenley & Jonny VanOrman	May 10, 2015	SC231	0.89
Megan loses her teeth in a bicycle accident and can't find them, becoming convinced someone has stolen them.
35b	15b	"Conquistador"	Neil Graf	Nick Bachman, Jim Dirschberger, Neil Graf & Matt Layzell	Nick Bachman & Dodge Greenley	May 10, 2015	SC232	0.89
Sanjay and Craig discover a statue of a golden conquistador in Darlene's old room, but soon discover it is haunted.
36a	16a	"Chewhuahuas"	Tom Parkinson	Josh Engel, Jay Howell, Derek Iversen & Tom Parkinson	Josh Engel & Dodge Greenley	April 19, 2015	SC235	TBA
Sanjay and his friends try to stop a small group of rabid Chihuahuas from following them.
36b	16b	"Space Invaders"	Sarah Oleksyk	Jim Dirshbeger, Gina Gress, Jay Howell & Sarah Oleksyk	Dodge Greenley & Gina Gress	April 19, 2015	SC234	TBA
Sanjay, Craig, and Megan try to stop Hector's close-talking tendencies.
37a	17a	"D.I.N.K."	Aminder Dhaliwal	Aminder Dhaliwal, Jim Dirschberger, Jay Howell & Jonny VanOrman	Dodge Greenley & Jonny VanOrman	April 26, 2015	SC236	1.09
Vijay gets a new high-tech car, much to Sanjay and Craig's dismay.
37b	17b	"Dangerous Debbie"	Neil Graf	Nick Bachman, Neil Graf & Jay Howell	Nick Bachman & Dodge Greenley	April 26, 2015	SC237	1.09
A love-smitten Craig kidnaps an electric eel from the tank of a sushi restaurant.
38a	18a	"Serpentco"	Bryan Mann	Nathan Bulmer, Derek Iversen & Bryan Mann	Nathan Bulmer & Dodge Greenley	October 2, 2015 (Note: This episode first aired on August 15, 2015 in Israel.)	SC238	1.24
Sanjay and Craig find out that somebody is making bootleg DVDs of Tufflips' movies and go undercover with Tufflips to find out who the culprit is.
38b	18b	"Chrome Dome"	Bryan Mann	Aminder Dhaliwal, Jim Dirschberger, Blake Lemons & Bryan Mann	Aminder Dhaliwal & Dodge Greenley	October 9, 2015	SC233	1.06
A billboard of a giant-headed lawyer gets blown by the wind. The boys set out to look for it with the help of the lawyer whom it belongs, while at the same time they try to tolerate his loud voice.
39a	19a	"Flabyrinth"	Sarah Oleksyk	Gina Gress, Derek Iversen & Sarah Oleksyk	Dodge Greenley & Gina Gress	July 25, 2015	SC239	0.73
Sanjay and Craig win a visit to a local Tufflips Labyrinth, only to be betrayed by Android Jim.
39b	19b	"Snake Parts Unknown"	Aminder Dhaliwal	Aminder Dhaliwal, Jim Dirschberger, Josh Engel & Derek Iversen	Josh Engel & Dodge Greenley	July 25, 2015	SC240	0.73
Craig becomes obsessed over Anthony Gourmand, who hosts the TV show "Foodventurer". Sanjay and Craig find him at the Frycade, where he's looking for the "ultimate" food. They are convinced that they will find it in the town, so they eat the local cuisine. However, Anthony Gourmand thinks the "ultimate" food is Craig. Sanjay has to rescue Craig from being eaten. Guest star: Anthony Bourdain as Anthony Gourmand
40	20	"Street Dogg"	Neil Graf & Bryan Mann	Nick Bachman, Aminder Dhaliwal, Jim Dirschberger, Jay Howell, Neil Graf, Matt Layzell, Blake Lemons, Bryan Mann, Will McRobb & Chris Viscardi	Nick Bachman, Aminder Dhaliwal & Dodge Greenley	May 17, 2015	SC227/228	1.22
A rapper called Street Dogg moves next door to Sanjay and Craig to escape the stress of celebrity life. The duo later discovers that he was formerly in a rap duo with Tufflips. So the kids try to reunite them, but it all leads up to an epic rap battle. Guest star: Snoop Dogg as Street Dogg

=== Season 3 (2015–16) ===
No. overall	No. in season	Title	Storyboard director(s)	Written by	Storyboard by	Original release date	Prod. code	U.S. viewers (millions)
41a	1a	"And Justice for Durdle"	Neil Graf	Adam Aseraf, Hunter Cope, Jim Dirschberger, Neil Graf & Jonny VanOrman	Dodge Greenley & Jonny VanOrman	January 15, 2016 (Note: This episode first aired on January 4, 2016 in Latin America.)	SC301	0.89
When Noodman tries one of Farmer Larry's "Blueberry Smoobbies", he discovers that it is actually dog vomit. Due to this, Noodman files a lawsuit against Farmer Larry. If Noodman wins, Farmer Larry could lose Blueberry Farm and his dogs. Farmer Larry is offered lawyers who are actually Sanjay and Craig in disguise.
41b	1b	"Beauty and the Beard"	Tom Parkinson	Mike Bertino, Derek Iversen, Blake Lemons & Tom Parkinson	Mike Bertino & Dodge Greenley	January 22, 2016	SC302	0.99
When Penny and Belle have a plumbing problem, Sanjay offers them to stay at his house. However, Darlene and Vijay want Belle to see a video. Sanjay must keep Belle upstairs because he thinks that the video is embarrassing.
42a	2a	"Hot Heads"	Nick Bachman	Adam Aseraf, Nick Bachman, Bryan Caselli & Hunter Cope	Bryan Caselli & Dodge Greenley	September 7, 2015	SC303	1.03
The kids try to reach Heat Nirvana level to experience the coolness of Lake Lundgren.
42b	2b	"Lundgren Loner"	Sarah Oleksyk	Gina Gress, Jay Howell, Will McRobb & Sarah Oleksyk	Dodge Greenley & Gina Gress	September 7, 2015	SC304	1.03
Sanjay tries to spend a whole afternoon alone at home without Craig, Vijay, and Darlene.
43a	3a	"Bike-o Psycho"	Neil Graf	Jim Dirschberger, Neil Graf, Derek Iversen & Jonny VanOrman	Dodge Greenley & Jonny VanOrman	September 18, 2015	SC306	1.67
Sanjay and Craig find an abandoned bike, but they must deal with Chido, the original owner who wants it back.
43b	3b	"Boulder Rollers"	Aminder Dhaliwal	Adam Aseraf, Hunter Cope, Aminder Dhaliwal & Josh Engel	Josh Engel & Dodge Greenley	October 16, 2015	SC305	1.07
Sanjay, Hector, and Megan try to push a giant boulder down the lake, while Craig tries to prove that Magnetic Snakes are real.
44a	4a	"Guitar Zeroes"	Nick Bachman	Nick Bachman, Bryan Caselli, Jim Dirschberger & Chris Viscardi	Bryan Caselli & Dodge Greenley	November 13, 2015	SC308	0.92
When Sanjay and Craig are offered to play at the Punk Pit, they seek a guitar legend known as KOR.
44b	4b	"Heartyface"	Tom Parkinson	Adam Aseraf, Mike Bertino, Hunter Cope, Jim Dirschberger & Tom Parkinson	Mike Bertino & Dodge Greenley	November 20, 2015	SC307	0.77
Craig gets obsessed with gaining popularity on a social media site called "Heartyface".
45a	5a	"Galaxy Geeks"	Aminder Dhaliwal	Josh Engel, Aminder Dhaliwal, Jim Dirschberger, Jay Howell & Chris Viscardi	Josh Engel & Dodge Greenley	September 25, 2015	SC310	1.14
The epic 'Alien Craig' fantasy space adventure continues with Noodman joining the children on a new mission.
45b	5b	"Freaks + Cheeks"	Sarah Oleksyk	Gina Gress, Sarah Oleksyk & Chris Viscardi	Gina Gress & Dodge Greenley	November 6, 2015	SC309	1.17
When Sanjay and Craig petsit Sweet Cheeks, a coyote unexpectedly breaks into the house.
46a	6a	"Dude Snake Nood"	Neil Graf	Neil Graf, Jay Howell, Derek Iversen & Jonny VanOrman	Dodge Greenley & Jonny VanOrman	January 29, 2016	SC311	0.85
Sanjay and Craig are forced to go on a play date with Noodman's nephew, Randy.
46b	6b	"Barrel Boyz"	Tom Parkinson	Mike Bertino, Jim Dirschberger, Will McRobb & Tom Parkinson	Mike Bertino & Dodge Greenley	February 5, 2016	SC312	0.99
Tufflips recruits Vijay to help him pull off his greatest stunt: going over Lundgren's Butt Rock Falls in a wooden barrel.
47a	7a	"All Night Bummer Party"	Nick Bachman	Adam Aseraf, Nick Bachman, Bryan Caselli, Hunter Cope & Jim Dirschberger	Bryan Caselli & Dodge Greenley	February 19, 2016	SC313	0.97
Sanjay and Craig celebrate their "friend-iversary" at a Frycade sleepover event, but the night doesn't go as Sanjay plans. Chido then convinces Sanjay to turn against Craig.
47b	7b	"Partybot Returns"	Sarah Oleksyk	Jim Dirschberger, Gina Gress, Jay Howell, Will McRobb, Sarah Oleksyk & Chris Viscardi	Dodge Greenley & Gina Gress	February 26, 2016	SC314	1.00
Vijay reprograms Partybot into an Artybot to showcase at Bertha Van Weld's tech expo.
48	8	"Huggle Day"	Aminder Dhaliwal & Neil Graf	Josh Engel, Aminder Dhaliwal, Jim Dirschberger, Neil Graf, Jay Howell, Will McRobb, Jonny VanOrman & Chris Viscardi	Josh Engel, Dodge Greenley & Jonny VanOrman	December 4, 2015	SC315/316	1.14
After ruining Lundgren's Huggle Day celebration, Sanjay and Craig set out to right their wrong, with the help of movie hero and town founder Dolph Lundgren, as they journey to find Huggle Bunny and discover the true meaning of Huggle Day. Guest star: Dolph Lundgren as himself.
49a	9a	"Paper Pushers"	Tom Parkinson	Mike Bertino, Jim Dirschberger, Derek Iversen & Tom Parkinson	Mike Bertino & Dodge Greenley	June 21, 2016 (Note: This episode first aired on April 8, 2016 in Greece.)	SC317	1.28
Noodman tries to uncover Sanjay and Craig's racket of keeping money for newspapers they don't deliver.
49b	9b	"Bros of a Feather"	Nick Bachman	Nick Bachman, Bryan Caselli, Katie Crown & Jim Dirschberger	Bryan Caselli & Dodge Greenley	June 21, 2016	SC318	1.28
Sanjay and Craig find an orphaned baby bird and decide to care for it.
50a	10a	"Ain't No Fang"	Sarah Oleksyk	Adam Aseraf, Hunter Cope, Jay Howell, Gina Gress & Sarah Oleksyk	Dodge Greenley & Gina Gress	June 22, 2016 (Note: This episode first aired on April 15, 2016 in Greece.)	SC319	1.10
Sanjay is accidentally bitten and envenomed by Craig. Almost unable to move, he's taught how to live as a snake by Craig.
50b	10b	"Balzalderac!"	Aminder Dhaliwal	Katie Crown, Aminder Dhaliwal, Josh Engel, Derek Iversen & Matt Layzell	Josh Engel & Dodge Greenley	June 22, 2016	SC320	1.10
Sanjay and Craig actually live their roles as fantasy heroes in Season 12 foretold in "King of Kids", in order to save the world and the time continuum.
51a	11a	"Master Smashers"	Tom Parkinson	Adam Aseraf, Mike Bertino, Hunter Cope & Tom Parkinson	Mike Bertino & Dodge Greenley	June 23, 2016 (Note: This episode first aired on April 22, 2016 in Greece.)	SC322	1.02
Sanjay and Craig help Vijay with clearing his warehouse of old junk, but there's a misunderstanding.
51b	11b	"All Couped Up"	Neil Graf	Katie Crown, Jim Dirschberger, Neil Graf & Jonny VanOrman	Dodge Greenley & Jonny VanOrman	June 23, 2016	SC321	1.02
Sanjay and Craig disguise themselves as Mick Mucus in order to win a car in an endurance contest.
52	12	"The Sanjay and Craig Stunt School Special"	Nick Bachman & Sarah Oleksyk	Adam Aseraf, Nick Bachman, Bryan Caselli, Hunter Cope, Katie Crown, Jim Dirschberger, Gina Gress, Jay Howell, Derek Iversen, Will McRobb, Sarah Oleksyk & Chris Viscardi	Bryan Caselli, Dodge Greenley & Gina Gress	July 22, 2016 (Note: This episode first aired on April 25, 2016 in Germany and Poland.)	SC323/324	1.33
When Craig joins Sanjay at stuntman school, he finds that his best bud is living in the shadow of Stasi Stuntman, an academic overachiever. Craig then encourages a reluctant Sanjay to compete against Stasi for a chance to become Tufflips' new sidekick.
53a	13a	"Combo Attack"	Aminder Dhaliwal	Katie Crown, Aminder Dhaliwal & Josh Engel	Dodge Greenley & Josh Engel	June 24, 2016 (Note: This episode first aired on June 18, 2016 in Latin America.)	SC325	0.98
Megan befriends Chido and forms a band with her called "Character Select", but struggles to keep their friendship and band a secret.
53b	13b	"Stuffed Curse Pizza"	Neil Graf	Jim Dirschberger, Neil Graf, Derek Iversen & Jonny VanOrman	Dodge Greenley & Jonny VanOrman	June 24, 2016	SC326	0.98
After failing to summon King Za, Sanjay is convinced that he is cursed.
54a	14a	"Quietude Dudes"	Tom Parkinson	Mike Bertino, Derek Iversen & Tom Parkinson	Mike Bertino & Dodge Greenley	July 18, 2016 (Note: This episode first aired on June 25, 2016 in Latin America.)	SC327	1.35
When Darlene has had a bad day from work, Sanjay and Craig try to be as quiet as they can so she could get some rest.
54b	14b	"Diaper Dinks"	Nick Bachman	Nick Bachman, Bryan Caselli, Katie Crown, Jim Dirschberger & Derek Iversen	Bryan Caselli & Dodge Greenley	July 18, 2016	SC328	1.35
When Sanjay, Craig, Hector, and Megan all revert into babies after eating baby food, they join in with Baby Richard Dickson to live like a baby. They then later discover that Baby Richard is turing everybody in Lundgren into babies and making them their slaves.
55a	15a	"Halloweenies"	Sarah Oleksyk	Katie Crown, Gina Gress & Sarah Oleksyk	Dodge Greenley & Gina Gress	June 20, 2016	SC329	1.30
The gang wishes every day was Halloween, so they decide to make it happen.
55b	15b	"GUTS Busters"	Aminder Dhaliwal	Aminder Dhaliwal, Jim Dirschberger, Josh Engel, Derek Iversen & Jay Howell	Josh Engel & Dodge Greenley	June 20, 2016	SC330	1.30
Sanjay, Craig, and Sam compete in a national tour of the Nickelodeon GUTS game show. Guest stars: Mike O'Malley and Moira "Mo" Quirk as themselves.
56a	16a	"Man of Squeal"	Tom Parkinson	Adam Aseraf, Mike Bertino, Hunter Cope & Tom Parkinson	Mike Bertino & Ben Bury	July 20, 2016	SC332	1.59
When Vijay is identified as "The Pig Man", he goes back to his old pig-training days, but the obsession gets out of hand.
56b	16b	"Songjay"	Neil Graf	Neil Graf, Jay Howell, Derek Iversen & Jonny VanOrman	Ben Bury & Jonny VanOrman	July 19, 2016 (Note: This episode is the musical.)	SC331	1.53
Sanjay and Craig appeal to the people of Lundgren to watch the appearance of a rare double-comet.
57a	17a	"Friend Card"	Aminder Dhaliwal	Katie Crown, Aminder Dhaliwal, Josh Engel, Derek Iversen & Matt Layzell	Josh Engel & Dodge Greenley	July 25, 2016	SC334	1.38
An old rivalry between Darlene and Noodman is reignited when Sanjay and Craig discover a Friend Card.
57b	17b	"Beach Butts"	Nick Bachman	Adam Aseraf, Bryan Caselli, Nick Bachman & Hunter Cope	Ben Bury & Bryan Caselli	July 25, 2016	SC333	1.38
When Sanjay and Craig agree to buy a present for Vijay, they get distracted and chill at the beach.
58a	18a	"JJ and Greg"	Aminder Dhaliwal	Aminder Dhaliwal, Jim Dirschberger, Josh Engel & Jay Howell	Ben Bury & Josh Engel	July 21, 2016	SC335	1.48
Sanjay and Craig become best buds with another dude-reptile duo, until they start to take over their lives.
58b	18b	"Tuff Rider"	Gina Gress	Byron Dockins, Gina Gress & Jonny VanOrman	Ben Bury & Jonny VanOrman	July 26, 2016	SC336	1.47
The kids try to recruit Tufflips for their bicycle gang, but upon learning that he cannot ride a bike, they dedicate themselves to teaching him.
59a	19a	"Space Train to Space"	Tom Parkinson	Mike Bertino, Katie Crown, Jim Dirschberger, Jay Howell & Tom Parkinson	Mike Bertino & Ben Bury	July 27, 2016	SC337	1.20
Dillinger Softlips steals a bunch of alien dinosaur eggs and it's up to Tufflips and a baby dinosaur named Pepe to stop him.
59b	19b	"The Snake Pit"	Gina Gress	Byron Dockins, Gina Gress & Jonny VanOrman	Ben Bury & Jonny VanOrman	July 28, 2016	SC338	1.29
Sanjay and Craig's friendship gets tested when Craig turns the attic into his personal party zone.
60	20	"Booyah for Bollywood"	Aminder Dhaliwal & Sarah Oleksyk	Aminder Dhaliwal, Jim Dirschberger, Josh Engel, Dodge Greenley, Jay Howell, Will McRobb, Sarah Oleksyk & Chris Viscardi	Ben Bury, Josh Engel & Dodge Greenley	July 29, 2016	SC339/340	1.24
When the Patels take a family vacation to India, Sanjay and Craig get to star as extras in a new Tufflips movie being directed by Ronnie, who gets into a breakdown when his brother's relationship with Sanjay stresses him out. Meanwhile, Vijay tries to show Darlene his favorite childhood places in India, only to discover that most of it had changed.
