= Collaborative RESearch Team to study psychosocial issues in Bipolar Disorder =

Canadian network of researchers

The Collaborative RESearch Team to study psychosocial issues in Bipolar Disorder (CREST.BD) is a Canadian multidisciplinary network of researchers, healthcare providers and people living with bipolar disorder. Their overarching aim is to improve the quality of life of people with bipolar disorder.

The team was founded in 2007 with provincial funding from British Columbia and has since received funding from the Canadian Institutes for Health Research (CIHR). They specialize in Community Based Participatory Research and integrated knowledge translation. CREST.BD has produced research on self-management strategies, psychosocial treatments quality of life, and stigma in bipolar disorder.

CREST.BD created the QoL.BD, the most widely used quality-of-life measure for bipolar disorder, which is available for use online at bdqol.com. CREST.BD also has released the Bipolar Wellness Centre, a centralized online resource for evidence-based quality-of-life recommendations for people living with bipolar disorder.

== See also ==
- International Society for Bipolar Disorders
- Depression and Bipolar Support Alliance
- Bipolar UK
- Outline of bipolar disorder
