= DBSA =

DBSA may refer to:

- Development Bank of Southern Africa
- Depression and Bipolar Support Alliance
- De Beers Societe Anonyme
- Dodecylbenzenesulfonic acid
