= Sanjay Patel (character) =

Sanjay Patel may refer to one of the following fictional characters, both portrayed by the same actor:

- Sanjay Patel, voiced by Maulik Pancholy in the American animated television series Sanjay and Craig
- Sanjay Patel, portrayed by Maulik Pancholy in the American live-action television series Weeds
