= Bipolar UK =

British bipolar disorder charity

- Founded: 1983
- Headquarters: London
- Area served: England, Wales and Northern Ireland

Bipolar UK, formerly MDF The Bipolar Organization, was established in 1983 (as the Manic Depression Fellowship) to enable people affected by bipolar disorder to take control of their lives. It is the only national charity that specializes in supporting bipolar disorder and is one of the largest user-led organizations in the mental health sector in the UK.

The charity is based in London, Charity Number 293340, with a staff of 14 people and 200 volunteers across the United Kingdom.

MDF The Bipolar Organization was formed by Sheila Woodland and Philomena Germing in 1983, along with 41 other individuals. The society's first meeting was in January 1983 in Church House, Westminster. In 2011 the organization changed its name from MDF to Bipolar UK. The group was formed to support those affected by bipolar, including those with a formal diagnosis, their families, and friends. As of 2022, the organization runs 85 support groups across England, Wales, and Northern Ireland.

The Charity's day-to-day activities are led by CEO Simon Kitchen and Deputy CEO Rosie Phillips. Overseeing the running of the charitable entity is the 13-member Board of Trustees.

== See also ==
- Mental health in the United Kingdom
- International Society for Bipolar Disorders
- Collaborative RESearch Team to study psychosocial issues in Bipolar Disorder
- Depression and Bipolar Support Alliance
- Outline of bipolar disorder
