= Jay Howell (illustrator) =

American artist, cartoonist, illustrator (born 1979)

- Born: Jason Howell; 1979 (age 46–47); Pleasanton, California, U.S.
- Education: Academy of Art University
- Known for: Illustrator, commercial artist, cartoonist, character designer, screenwriter, muralist, tattoo artist

Jason "Jay" Howell (born 1979) is an American illustrator, cartoonist, and character designer. He has also worked as a commercial artist, muralist, and tattoo artist. Howell was a co-creator and animator on the Nickelodeon animated series Sanjay and Craig, as well as a character designer on the Fox TV series Bob’s Burgers.

== Life and career ==
Howell is from Pleasanton, California, and graduated from Amador Valley High School. He continued his studies at the Academy of Art University in San Francisco for a few months.

Howell took an interest in skateboard culture and punk music. In his early career he created DIY zines under the name "Punks Git Cut" and "Sanjay and Craig", and left them around the San Francisco Bay Area. In the early 2000s Howell worked at Atlas Cafe in the Mission District in San Francisco, where he met members of the Mission School movement, and animator and director Loren Bouchard.

The proof of concept for Bob’s Burgers (2011–present) was created by Howell, working as the character designer; and Sirron Norris, working as the background artist.

== Publications ==
- Howell, Jay (2015). Punks Git Cut Anthology. San Francisco, California: Last Gasp. ISBN 978-0-86719-806-5.
