= Bipolar Disorders (journal) =

- Discipline: Psychiatry
- Language: English
- Edited by: K.N. Roy Chengappa, Gin S. Malhi

Publication details
- History: 1999–present
- Publisher: Wiley-Blackwell on behalf of the International Society for Bipolar Disorders
- Frequency: 8/year
- Impact factor: 6.744 (2021)

Standard abbreviations
- ISO 4: Bipolar Disord.

Indexing
- CODEN: BDIIAU
- ISSN: 1398-5647 (print); 1399-5618 (web)
- LCCN: 00243059
- OCLC no.: 462826263

Links
- Journal homepage; Online access; Online archive

Bipolar Disorders is a peer-reviewed medical journal covering research on bipolar disorders. It is published 8 times a year by Wiley-Blackwell and is an official journal of the International Society for Bipolar Disorders. The journal was established in 1999 and the editors-in-chief are K.N. Roy Chengappa and Gin S. Malhi (Western Psychiatric Institute & Clinic).

== Abstracting and indexing ==
The journal is abstracted and indexed in:

- Academic Search
- CSA Biological Sciences Database
- CSA Neurosciences Abstracts
- Current Contents/Clinical Medicine
- EMBASE
- Index Medicus/MEDLINE/PubMed
- PsycINFO/Psychological Abstracts
- Science Citation Index Expanded
- Scopus

According to the Journal Citation Reports, the journal has a 2021 impact factor of 6.744.

== See also ==
- International Society for Bipolar Disorders
- Outline of bipolar disorder
