= Sanjay and Craig =

American animated sitcom (2013–2016)

- Genre: Animated sitcom; Slapstick
- Created by: Jim Dirschberger; Jay Howell; Andreas Trolf
- Creative director: Jay Howell
- Voices of: Maulik Pancholy; Chris Hardwick; Kunal Nayyar; Hari Leigh; Grey DeLisle; Nika Futterman; Matt Jones; Linda Cardellini; Tony Hale; Chris D'Elia
- Theme music composer: John Dwyer
- Opening theme: "Sanjay and Craig", performed by Chris Hardwick and Maulik Pancholy
- Ending theme: "Sanjay and Craig" (instrumental)
- Composer: Matt Mahaffey
- Country of origin: United States
- Original language: English
- No. of seasons: 3
- No. of episodes: 60 (114 segments) (list of episodes)

Production
- Executive producer: Will McRobb and Chris Viscardi
- Producer: Lisa Thibault Woods
- Editor: Steve Downs
- Running time: 22 minutes
- Production companies: Forest City Rockers; Nickelodeon Animation Studio

Original release
- Network: Nickelodeon
- Release: May 25, 2013 – July 29, 2016

Sanjay and Craig is an American animated sitcom created by Jim Dirschberger, Jay Howell, and Andreas Trolf for Nickelodeon. Produced by Will McRobb and Chris Viscardi, the series revolves around Sanjay, voiced by Maulik Pancholy, and his best friend Craig, voiced by Chris Hardwick, a talking snake.

The series was first pitched in 2009 and officially began production in June 2012, a few months after the pilot was completed. The series first aired on Nickelodeon on May 25, 2013. The series was renewed for a second season on September 12, 2013, that began airing on July 12, 2014, and for a third season on June 11, 2014, that premiered on September 7, 2015. Hardwick confirmed on Twitter on June 10, 2016, that the series had officially finished production. The series ended on July 29, 2016, with the half-hour special episode "Booyah for Bollywood", having aired three seasons and 60 episodes. Reruns were continued on Nicktoons until March 31, 2022.

== Plot ==
The series follows Sanjay Patel and Craig Slithers as they have comedic adventures around the town of Lundgren, often involving their parents Vijay and Darlene. Sanjay also helps Craig as he tries to keep his ability to talk a secret while avoiding their snake-terrified neighbor Mr. Leslie Noodman.

== Episodes ==
Season	Segments	Episodes	Original air date	
Season	Segments	Episodes	First aired	Last aired
1	39	20	May 25, 2013	July 19, 2014
2	38	20	July 12, 2014	October 9, 2015
3	37	20	September 7, 2015	July 29, 2016

== Characters ==
- Sanjay Patel (voiced by Maulik Pancholy) is a half-Indian, half-European American 12-year-old boy who goes on adventures with his best friend, Craig. He has a crush on Belle Pepper, who works at his favorite place to hang out, The Frycade. Sanjay attends Stuntman School and idolizes Remington Tufflips, a washed-up action movie star from the 1980s. Sanjay struggles to fit in most of the time and always enjoys his time with Craig, despite being annoyed by his occasional arrogance at times. Sanjay is named after the character of the same name from the Showtime dark comedy-drama series Weeds, whom Pancholy had portrayed in live-action from 2005 to 2012.
- Craig Slithers (voiced by Chris Hardwick) is Sanjay's pet snake whom he met in a pet store. Craig is a so-called "master of disguise" — whether he is a doctor, a lawyer, or a beauty pageant queen, no one ever recognizes him. Only a few people know Craig can talk; Sanjay and his close friends keep it a secret. Despite being brought from a pet store, Craig does not like to be called just a pet and sometimes gets a little arrogant and overconfident in himself, which usually never ends very well for him.
- Vijay Patel (voiced by Kunal Nayyar) is Sanjay's father and owns a clearance store in the neighborhood. He has invented various mechanicals, such as a party-obsessed, dancing robot, the Partybot. He also knows that Sanjay's pet snake Craig can talk.
- Darlene Patel (voiced by Hari Leigh in the pilot and later voiced by Grey DeLisle onwards) is Sanjay's Caucasian mother who works at a hospital as a registered nurse and a surgeon. She often tells Sanjay stories about her work. She also knows Sanjay's pet snake Craig can talk. She is rarely seen without her surgical scrubs.
- Belle Pepper (voiced by Nika Futterman) is an attractive, redheaded 16-year-old girl who works at the Frycade, Sanjay and Craig's favorite place to hang out. Sanjay has a crush on her, yet when he attempts to talk to her, it does not work out. Though she is a good friend of Sanjay, she rarely shows any signs of seeing him as her boyfriend, unlike Megan, who shows her passion constantly.
- Hector Flanagan (voiced by Matt Jones) is Sanjay and Craig's weird, eyepatch-wearing friend of Hispanic-Irish blood. He can annoy them at times and has a crush on Megan. He also has never thrown up in his life, but when Sanjay and Craig get him to look at his own butt, he eventually does vomit.
- Megan Sparkles (voiced by Linda Cardellini) is Sanjay and Craig's enthusiastic and overachieving friend who takes part in beauty pageants. Megan is a frequent beauty pageant winner who can get carried away at times, but loves helping Sanjay. She has an unrequited crush on Sanjay, although Sanjay does care about her as a friend.
- Mr. Leslie Noodman (voiced by Tony Hale) is Sanjay and Craig's psychotic neighbor who dislikes snakes. He has a pathological fear of them because of a prank his father pulled on him when he was young (his father actually pulls many pranks on him, thus, he dislikes his father). He loves his cat, Lady Butterscotch, but is Sanjay and Craig's number one enemy. He cares deeply for his award-winning blueberries and likes to use his shovel as a weapon. He seems to be aware about Craig and would go to great lengths to threaten him.
- Lady Butterscotch (vocal effects provided by Frank Welker) is Mr. Noodman's pet cat. Noodman appears to really admire her. As revealed in "Butt's Up", she was originally owned by Darlene, until Noodman took her away during a game of Butt's Up.
- Remington Tufflips (voiced by Chris D'Elia, credited as "Remington Tufflips") is a washed-up action movie star from the 1980s who Sanjay and Craig idolize. To them, he is the raddest guy to ever walk on the face of the Earth. Despite his has-been status, Tufflips' ego and arrogance have swelled over the years, along with his waistline. To Sanjay and Craig, he is still the king of cool, in their adoring eyes. Although he is Sanjay and Craig's ultimate hero, he usually fails to remember their names. In "Street Dogg", Tufflips was formerly a rapper before his movie career, and was in a band with Street Dogg (a parody of Snoop Dogg). In "Booyah for Bollywood", it is revealed that his real name was "Remington TuffFist", in which Sanjay and Craig (as well as TuffFist himself) were calling him his wrong name the whole time. His design was inspired by Elvis Presley.
- The Dicksons (Sandy (voiced by Hari Leigh in the pilot and later voiced by Grey DeLisle onwards), Scabs (voiced by Chris Hardwick in the pilot and later voiced by Grey DeLisle onwards) and Brenda voiced by Grey DeLisle, Baby Richard voiced by Nolan North) are three siblings who have a hard rock band called the "Tuff Skulls". Their names are Sandy, Scabs, and Baby Richard. Sanjay and Craig appear to really like the Dicksons' music, and although the Dicksons look like bullies, they are mostly indifferent to Sanjay and Craig's adoration and would never intentionally harm them, though they can be very aggressive at times. Their mother, Brenda, only communicates through grunting and snorting, but as revealed in "Enter Sandman", she can actually talk, but only when her children aren't around.
- Ronnie Slithers (voiced by Nolan North) is a wealthy corn snake who is revealed to be Craig's long-lost brother and first appeared in "A Tail of Two Slithers". Ronnie's cruel tendencies have led Sanjay and Craig to believe that they are no longer the best of friends. He later joins Sanjay's side by revealing to his soldiers that he is a snake, and later gets returned to the pet shop, where he formerly lived with Craig before Sanjay found him. Ronnie makes a return in the series finale, "Booyah for Bollywood", where it is revealed that after his last encounter with his brother, Ronnie decided to live in India throughout a shipping box after feeling hopeless in finding a new owner. During his life in India, Ronnie learns to control his anger by practicing Yoga and Meditation, and later becomes a movie director.
- Penny Pepper (voiced by John DiMaggio) is the owner of The Frycade and Belle's father. Penny makes the wings at the Frycade and is very good friends with the Patels. He is known for having hooks for hands and there was never an explanation on how he lost them.
- Chicken Chuck (voiced by Nolan North) is a frequent visitor to "The Frycade" and longtime friend of Penny since childhood. He was ranked #1 on the wall of wings before Tyson took his spot. He also works at a Car Wash called "Splash 'N' Dash", as shown in "Old Farts". In "Middle Shame" it's revealed that Chuck is his last name and Chicken is his first. In the same episode it is revealed that Chuck was raised by chickens in a farm and was once a guitarist rock star named "KOR" as revealed in "Guitar Zeroes". Chuck was originally a recurring background character in the first season often used for gags before his character was refined in the episode "Hot Sauce Boss" where we was established as Penny's best friend and later had more focus in the second and third seasons.
- Huggle Bunny is a carnival entertainer. He is considered to be mysterious by many. The town of Lundgren celebrates a Christmas-like holiday centered around him, which they name "Huggle Day".
- Tyson (voiced by David Hornsby) is a very rude and sarcastic young man who speaks in a British accent, and is Sanjay's primary rival for Belle's affections. He carries a scooter in his pants and often tries to ruin Sanjay's fun.
- Sam Lastnamè (voiced by Tania Gunadi) is a former member of the Butts Up Club and Sanjay's newest friend. She first appeared in the episode "Butts Up", and also appeared in "Street Dogg", "Huggle Day", "The Sanjay and Craig Stunt School Special", "JJ and Greg", and "Booyah for Bollywood" in background roles. She makes a full return in "GUTS Busters" where she to competes on the game show GUTS.
- Farmer Larry (voiced by Toby Huss) is a farmer at Blueberry Farm. He helps Sanjay and Craig make blueberry jam to keep Mr. Noodman from calling the pound in the episode "Dog Wave". He is also the current owner of Sanjay's former dog "Barfy".
- Barfy (vocal effects provided by Fred Tatasciore) is a purple barfing dog that Sanjay wants to adopt. He entered the contest to win Barfy for free 100 times; the plan was successful, but it also backfired, as Sanjay ended up winning not only Barfy but also 99 other dogs. Barfy was given to Farmer Larry because Mr. Noodman would harass the purple dog and also because Farmer Larry needed some blueberry dogs. Barfy returns in the episode "Barfy's Babies", when she gave birth the three puppies named Barfy Jr., Lil' Beef, and Puppy.
- Dolph Lundgren (voiced by himself) is the founder of the town the series takes place in. He made his first appearance on-screen in the episode "Huggle Day", where he tries to search for Huggle Bunny and reveals to Sanjay and Craig on how he really founded Lundgren and Huggle Day. Before the events of the series, he has become lost and cold in the middle of snowstorm during a hike before being saved by Huggle Bunny who gave him some shelter.
- Chido (voiced by Natasha Lyonne in "Bike-o Psycho", later voiced by Pamela Adlon) is a sarcastic and tough red-headed girl who owns a bike named "Glutte". She also makes paper hats and also plays electric guitar as a hobby. Chido made her first appearance in the episode "Bike-o Psycho". In "Combo Attack", Megan befriended her and they both formed a band together called "Character Select".
- Stasi Stuntman (voiced by Janet Varney) is an academic overachieving 12-year-old girl who attends Stuntman School, which is founded by her parents "The Flying Stuntman". While Stasi shows pride in being a stunt girl, she admits she's only one because her overbearing parents wanted her to be one and wants to live her dream of being a stand-up comedian. She made her first appearance in "The Sanjay and Craig Stunt School Special" and makes a cameo at the end of "Booyah for Bollywood".
- Maximum Dennis (voiced by Nolan North, credited as "Maximum Dennis") is a popular American Tough Guy. Sanjay and Craig once disguised as him in order to beat Tyson, and to attract Belle.
- Noodman's father (voiced by John DiMaggio) is the cold-hearted father of Leslie Noodman. He enjoys making his son's life miserable by pranking him with his fear of snakes. He has a fear of cats especially Noodman's pet cat, Lady Butterscotch.
- Noodman's grandfather (voiced by John DiMaggio) is the grandfather of Noodman's father. Like his father's son, he enjoys pranking his son with his fear of cats. He only appears in the episode "Family Re-Noodman". He also has a fear of butterflies.
- Randy Noodman (voiced by Christopher Mintz-Plasse) is Noodman's teenage nephew who seems to get along well with Sanjay and Craig. He is one of the few recurring characters who knows that Craig is a talking snake, but keeps the secret for himself. Randy made his debut in the episode "Dude Snake Nood".
- Uncle Thurop (voiced by Thurop Van Orman) is one of Noodman's relatives. He is short and has a broken leg. He appears in the episodes "Family Re-Noodman" and "Fart Baby".
- Hank Flanagan (voiced by Nolan North) is Hector's father of Irish descent. He has the tendency to refer people as "players".
- Mrs. Flanagan (voiced by Linda Cardellini in seasons 1 and 2, later voiced by Grey DeLisle in season 3) is Hector's mother of Hispanic descent and Hank's wife. Her real name was never said.
- Hector's grandmother (voiced by Grey DeLisle) is Hector's Hispanic grandmother and Mrs. Flanagan's mother. She serves as the family chef and is considered a hugger when greeting people.
- Sweet Cheeks (vocal effects provided by Fred Tatasciore) is Hector's pet dog who has very large cheeks.
- Booger Johnson (vocal effects provided by Ryan Crego) is Megan's pet gerbil. Sanjay once took care of him while Megan was out of town, and tried to get Craig to see him as a friend instead of a snack. He is also has the most hearts on a social-media site called "Heartyface".
- Debbie Jo Sparkles (voiced by Grey Griffin) is Megan's mother and a former pageant competitor.
- Grandma Wheezy (voiced by Eliza Schneider) is Sanjay's grandmother and Darlene's mother. She first appeared in the episode "Conquistador".
- PMA Guy (voiced by Carl Faruolo) is a judge and a stand-up comedian, who has an obsession with laughing. He appears as a background character associated with gags in the first season before being phased out after the episode "Glad To Be Sad".
- Elmer Raskawitz / "Raska Boosh" (voiced by Adam DeVine) is a comedic internet prank show host of a show called "Booshed", Sanjay and Craig are his biggest fans. In the climax scene of the episode, he turned out to be a college dropout to terrorize innocent people with his constant pranks for fame and his show's ratings.
- Mr. Munchie (voiced by Sam Lavagnino) is a candy store owner who has the voice of a small child and sells strange candy like Flip Flopas, which makes garbage taste good and actual food taste very terrible. He was once a member of Hector's Grandmother's book club and has a crush on her.
- Chill Bill (voiced by Michael-Leon Wooley) is a wandering Bassist who lives in a convenience store in a cavern underneath a sinkhole. He once tried to split up Sanjay and Craig.

== Production ==
Howell said that the idea began with a comic he and Dirschberger had made in 2004, where the main character was a snake charmer named Sanji and Craig was his "really crude roommate buddy who's a talking snake". Then, Nickelodeon executive Audrey Diehl recruited Howell and Dirschberger after finding an internet cartoon they had created titled "The Forest City Rockers", the namesake of Howell and Dirschberger's production company.

Sanjay and Craig was unsuccessfully pitched twice to Nickelodeon before Trolf, Dirschberger, and Howell sought advice from Loren Bouchard, whom Howell had designed characters for while creating Bob's Burgers for Fox Broadcasting Company. Dirschberger said of the meeting that "Bouchard showed us the "Bob's Burgers" pitch packet, which was, like, four pages of beautifully executed writing and art, and that was it. So we combined what we had learned from the first two pitches, put it in this really simple presentation." The series' usage of gross-out humor is based on the fact both Howell and Dirschberger have mothers who are nurses, "and they've told us a lot of gross stories over the years", which also served as the basis for the character of Darlene. Over the course of development, Dirschberger changed Sanjay to a twelve-year-old boy "without a weird quirk or affectation", and the premise during the second pitch was "four kids who lived in a garbage dump", providing the basis for Sanjay and Craig's friends Megan and Hector.

Since none of the three creators had produced a series before, Nickelodeon chose McRobb and Viscardi as executive producers; Howell said that their experience on Pete & Pete helped them add "surreal kids' stuff" to Sanjay and Craig. Unlike most animated series, Sanjay and Craig does not rely on scripting; instead the writers make an outline which is then converted to a storyboard. Thurop Van Orman, known for creating The Marvelous Misadventures of Flapjack for Cartoon Network, served as the supervising producer for the first season.

The series is notable for featuring celebrity guest stars as fictionalized versions of themselves, including Snoop Dogg, Anthony Bourdain, and Dolph Lundgren. Certain episodes are also based on past Nickelodeon game shows and similarly feature their hosts: a first-season episode based on Double Dare features Marc Summers and Harvey, while a third-season episode based on Nickelodeon Guts features Mike O'Malley and Moira Quirk. Bourdain, who voiced a character named Anthony Gourmand, claimed to be a "mega fan of Sanjay and Craig. I've seen absolutely every episode," and that "it's a little weird seeing my voice coming out of Anthony Gourmand, but my friends have been telling me that I've been a cartoon of myself for years, so really I'm kind of used to this." Other guests include Paul Reubens, Adam DeVine, and Michael-Leon Wooley, who voice original characters.

== Broadcast ==
The series aired worldwide on Nickelodeon. It premiered on August 17, 2013, on YTV in Canada, on September 6, 2013, in Southeast Asia, on November 4, 2013, in Australia and New Zealand, on November 5, 2013, in the United Kingdom and Ireland, and on February 3, 2014, in South Africa.

== Home media ==
=== DVD releases ===
Region 1
DVD title	Series(s)	Aspect ratio	Episode count	Total running time	Release date(s)
The Complete First Season	1	16:9	20	449 minutes	July 13, 2015

== Reception ==
David Weigand of the San Francisco Chronicle said that the series is "juvenile but also smart and funny" and "understands that kids are kids but also are often more sophisticated than children's television acknowledges." Giving it 3 stars out of 5, David Hinckley of New York Daily News said that the show "doesn't tiptoe around the stuff kids love most. Like gross stuff and absurd slapstick that in real life would probably get you killed." Marah Eakin of The A.V. Club gave the first two episodes an "A". The premiere episode had an estimated 3.6 million viewers. Emily Ashby of Common Sense Media gave the show 2 out of 5 stars, stating, "There's no rhyme, reason, or reality to the characters' misadventures, which can be a fun departure from real life but at the same time doesn't give them anything positive to glean from the content."

== See also ==
- Weeds
- Double Dare
- Nickelodeon Guts
