= Maulik Pancholy =

American actor (born 1974)

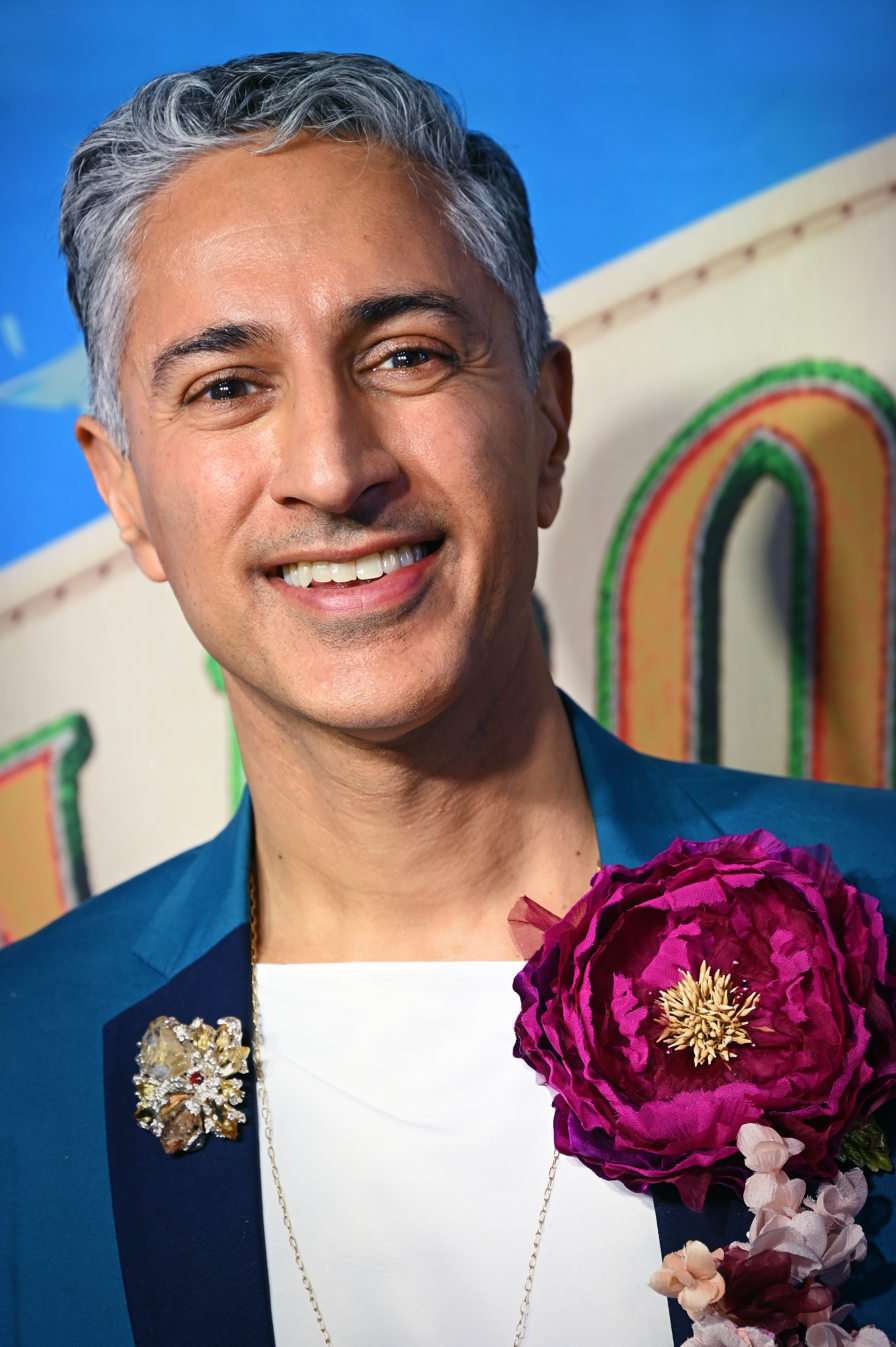
- Pancholy in 2026
- Born: Maulik Navin Pancholy; January 18, 1974 (age 52); Dayton, Ohio, U.S.
- Education: Northwestern University (BA); Yale University (MFA)
- Occupations: Actor; author
- Years active: 1998–present
- Spouse: Ryan Corvaia (m. 2014)
- Awards: Lambda Literary Award for Middle Grade Literature (2023)
- Website: www.maulikpancholy.com

Maulik Navin Pancholy (/moʊliːk nɑːvɪn pænˈtʃoʊli/, born January 18, 1974) is an American actor and author. He is best known for his roles as Jonathan on 30 Rock, Baljeet Tjinder in Phineas and Ferb, Neal in the first season of Whitney, and as characters named Sanjay Patel in both Weeds and Sanjay and Craig. His debut novel, The Best at It (from Balzer + Bray/HarperCollins), is about a gay, Indian American boy coming into his own. It was named a 2020 Stonewall Honor Book by the American Library Association. In 2022, he released Nikhil Out Loud, which tells the story of eighth grade theater kids rising up against homophobia in their community. It won the 2023 Lambda Literary Award for Middle Grade Literature.

== Early life and education ==
Pancholy was born in Dayton, Ohio, to Gujarati parents Gita Jayantilal and Navin Chimanlal Pancholy. He moved around while growing up, living in Ohio, Indiana, and Texas before his family settled in Tampa, Florida, where he attended junior high and high school at Berkeley Preparatory School. His family comes from Gujarat, and his grandparents lived in Ahmedabad. He is a 1991 graduate of the Berkeley Preparatory School in Tampa, and went on to major in theater at Northwestern University, where he received his bachelor's degree in 1995. He then attended the Yale School of Drama, where he received his Master of Fine Arts in 2003.

== Career ==
Pancholy played the character of Jonathan on the award-winning NBC series 30 Rock, Sanjay Patel on Showtime's Weeds and Nickelodeon's Sanjay & Craig, Neal on the first season of NBC's Whitney, and voiced the character of Baljeet Tjinder on Disney's Phineas & Ferb. Additional television work includes guest roles on The Good Fight, The Good Wife, Elementary, Dynasty, Friends from College, Tracey Takes On..., The Sopranos, Law & Order: Criminal Intent, and The Comeback.

On February 13, 2017, StarTrek.com stated that Pancholy would play Nambue, Chief Medical Officer of the USS Shenzhou in the upcoming TV series Star Trek: Discovery. His character appeared in the pilot episode, "The Vulcan Hello", which aired on September 24, 2017, and streamed on CBS's online service in America and Netflix abroad.

His stage credits in New York City include the Culture Project's production of Guantanamo: Honor Bound to Defend Freedom in 2004, a workshop of the play Morbidity & Mortality at the historic Cherry Lane Theatre in 2005, and the lead role in India Awaiting at the Samuel Beckett Theatre. In January 2015, he joined the cast of Terrence McNally's It's Only a Play, replacing Rupert Grint when the production's Broadway run was extended. Washington DC stage credits include Katherina in an all-male version of the Shakespeare Theatre Company's The Taming of the Shrew in 2016. He starred as 'Kevin' in the world premiere engagement of Ken Urban's The Remains at the Studio Theatre in 2018.

In 2019, Pancholy played 'Tommy' in Bess Wohl's Grand Horizons at the Williamstown Theatre Festival. It was announced that he would reprise the role in Second Stage's Broadway production of the play at the Helen Hayes Theater.

== Personal life ==
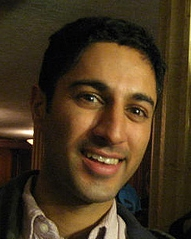
Pancholy in 2007

Pancholy came out as gay in a November 2013 interview with Out in which he discussed his partner of nine years, chef and caterer Ryan Corvaia. They were engaged at the Taj Mahal in January 2014 and were married in September that year. Pancholy and Corvaia were among the invited guests at a state dinner President Joe Biden held for Indian Prime Minister Narendra Modi.

Pancholy speaks English, Gujarati, and Spanish. He is also proficient in Hindi, which he speaks in the 30 Rock episode "Khonani".

=== Political activism ===
On April 25, 2014, Pancholy was named to President Barack Obama's Advisory Commission on Asian Americans and Pacific Islanders as part of the White House Initiative on Asian Americans and Pacific Islanders. On February 25, 2017, Pancholy and nine other members of the commission resigned from their positions, citing administrative actions by President Donald Trump that they claimed went "against the commission's principles".

Pancholy is active with several non-profit and social policy organizations including Asian Americans Advancing Justice - Los Angeles, the New York City Anti-Violence Project, and OutRight Action International, formerly known as the International Gay and Lesbian Human Rights Commission.

Pancholy is the chair and co-founder of the anti-bullying nonprofit Act To Change. He helped launch the campaign during his time serving on President Obama's Advisory Commission. Act To Change was transitioned outside of the White House after the 2016 presidential election.

== Filmography ==
=== Film ===
Year	Film	Role	Notes
1999	Pokémon Trading Card Game: Trainer Video	Adult Card Trader	
2005	Hitch	Raoul	
2006	Friends with Money	Flirtatious Waiter	
2006	Quarter Life Crisis	Neil Desai	
2006	Park	Babar	
2008	27 Dresses	Trent	
2009	Love N' Dancing	Gunmay	
2010	Love Ranch	Samir Singh	
2010	Good Sharma	Samir	
2010	Tug	Carl	
2010	See You in September	Roger	
2010	Raspberry Magic	Amrish Patil	
2011	Horrible Bosses	Gregory	Voice only
2011	Phineas and Ferb the Movie: Across the 2nd Dimension	Baljeet Tjinder / 2nd Baljeet	Voice only
2011	Scooby-Doo! Legend of the Phantosaur	Doctor	Voice only
2012	Treasure Buddies	Babi	Voice only
2013	Super Buddies	Curly the Pig	Voice only
2020	Phineas and Ferb the Movie: Candace Against the Universe	Baljeet Tjinder	Voice only
2026	The Debut	Eli	Completed
2028	Untitled Third Phineas and Ferb Movie	Baljeet Tjinder	Voice only

=== Television ===
Year	Show	Role	Notes
1998	USA High	Achmed	Episode: "Jackson Moves Out"
1998	City Guys	Rasheed	Episode: "Jamal Got His Gun"
1998	Malibu, CA	Haji	Episode: "Surf Sale"
1998	Felicity	T.A.	Episode: "Finally"
1999	Tracey Takes On...	Roberto	Episode: "Road Rage"
1999	Jack & Jill	Barto's Classmate	2 episodes
1999	Charmed	Treasure Hunter No. 1	Episode: "That Old Black Magic"
1999, 2000	The Wild Thornberrys	Kazi/Tenzin/Construction Wallah (voice)	Episodes: "Happy Campers" "You Ain't Seen Nothing Yeti"
2000	Family Law	Clerk	Episode: "Metamorphosis"
2005–2009, 2012	Weeds	Sanjay Patel	Recurring seasons 1–5, 8
2005	The Comeback	Kaveen Kahan	3 episodes
2006–2011, 2012–2013	30 Rock	Jonathan	Recurring seasons 1–2; main seasons 3–5, 7
2007	Law & Order: Criminal Intent	Aziz Gabriel/Dani Hasni	Episode: "Stress Position" "World's Fair"
2007	The Sopranos	Dr. Ajit Gupte	Episode: "Stage 5"
2007–2015, 2025–present	Phineas and Ferb	Baljeet Tjinder (voice)	130 episodes
2009	The Replacements	Kamil Sattar (voice)	Episode: "Snide and Prejudice"
2010	Running Wilde	Himself	Episode: "Mental Flaws"
2011	Web Therapy	Kamal Prakash	Recurring; season 1
2011–2012	Whitney	Neal	Main (season 1)
2013–2016	Sanjay and Craig	Sanjay Patel (voice)	Main role, 60 episodes
2014	The Good Wife	Dev Jain	Episode: "Parallel Construction, Bitches"
2016	The Muppets	Photographer	Episode: "Got Silk?"
2017	Star Trek: Discovery	Dr. Nambue	Episode: "The Vulcan Hello"
2017	Friends from College	Patel	Episode: "A Night of Surprises"
2017, 2019	Milo Murphy's Law	Neal; Baljeet Tjinder	6 episodes
2018	Elementary	Alfonse Kapoor	Episode: "Our Time Is Up"
2019	Dynasty	Kenneth Desai	Episode: "Filthy Games"
2019, 2020	American Dad!	Nudist/Improv Actor (voice)	Episodes: "Stan & Francine & Connie & Ted", "100 Years a Solid Fool"
2019	The Good Fight	Dev Jain	2 episodes
2019	Mickey Mouse Mixed-Up Adventures	Jasper (voice)	Episode: "Here, Kitty, Kitty, Kitty!"
2019–2022	Helpsters	Robbie Runner	2 episodes
2020–2022	Mira, Royal Detective	Ranjeet/Gardening Vendor/Uncle (voice)	12 episodes
2021	Q-Force	(voice)	2 episodes
2021	Only Murders in the Building	Arnav	3 episodes
2022	Would I Lie to You? (US)	Himself	Episode: "Show Goat"
2025	Goldie	Petey's Dad (voice)	Episode: "Tall Teeny/Pilroy"
2025	Leverage: Redemption	Neal Trividi	Episode: "The Swipe Right Job"
2026	Hey A.J.!	(voice)	6 episodes
2026	Max & the Midknights	Timmy (voice)	2 episodes

=== Video games ===
Year	Game	Role	Notes
2011	Phineas and Ferb: Across the 2nd Dimension	Baljeet Tjinder / 2nd Baljeet	
2013	Phineas and Ferb: Quest for Cool Stuff	Baljeet Tjinder	

=== Stage ===
Year	Title	Role	Location	Category
2003	Aunt Dan and Lemon	Marty	Acorn Theatre	Off-Broadway
2004	Guantanamo: Honor Bound to Defend Freedom	Ruhel Ahmed	Lynn Redgrave Theater	Off-Broadway
2005	Morbidity & Mortality	—N/a	Cherry Lane Theatre	Off-Broadway
2014–2015	It's Only a Play	Frank Finger	Gerald Schoenfeld Theatre and Bernard B. Jacobs Theatre	Broadway
2016	The Taming of the Shrew	Katharina Minola	Shakespeare Theatre Company at Sidney Harman Hall	Regional
2018	Good for Otto	Alex	Pershing Square Signature Center	Off-Broadway
2018	The Remains	Kevin	Studio Theatre	Regional
2019	Grand Horizons	Tommy	Hayes Theater	Broadway
2022	To My Girls	Castor	Tony Kiser Theater	Off-Broadway
2025	Right Before I Go	Performer	The Tank	Off-Off-Broadway
2026	Schmigadoon!	Reverend Howard Layton / Leprechaun	Nederlander Theatre	Broadway
