= Lifelong AIDS Alliance =

Non-profit organization in Seattle, USA

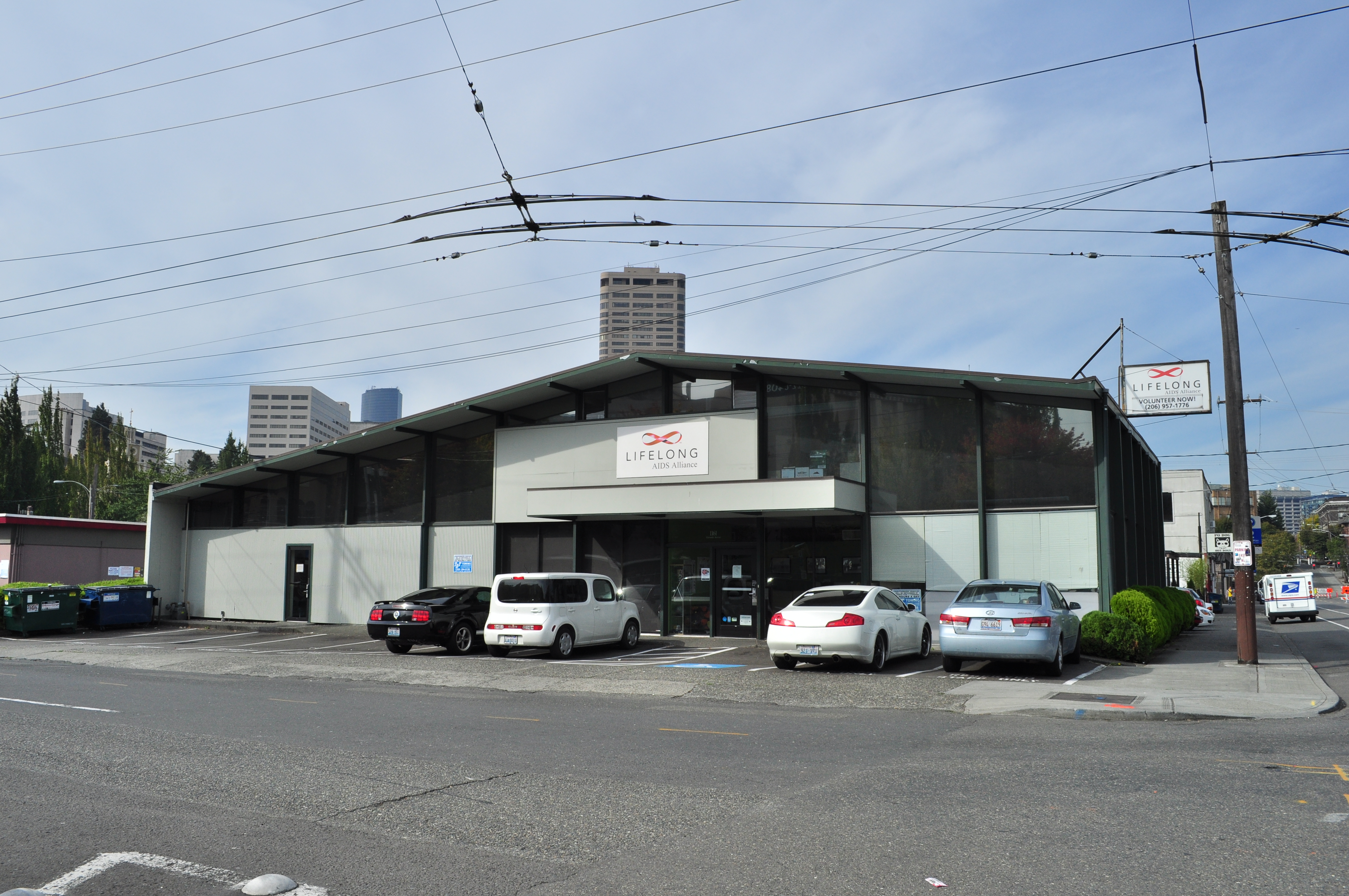
- Lifelong AIDS Alliance in Seattle
- Abbreviation: LLAA
- Type: Nonprofit
- Purpose: Humanitarian, advocacy
- Location: Capitol Hill, Seattle, United States
- Services: Care services, legal advocacy
- Website: Official website

Lifelong AIDS Alliance (LLAA) is a non-profit organization in Capitol Hill in Seattle which provides care services to local people living with HIV or AIDS and which does advocacy for HIV-related legal issues in the state government.

== History ==
In 2003 government funding cuts left less money for HIV prevention services at a time when HIV infection rates were rising in King County. LLAA participated in the statewide debate about what should be done in response to raising rates of HIV infection and less available funding. At this time LLAA started an online advertising campaign to raise awareness of HIV issues. In response to these same budget cuts, some critics called for a re-evaluation of LLAA services, such as home care. Historically people with HIV needed a lot of assistance for home care, but since the advent of HAART, fewer HIV positive people needed these services with the same frequency, and there was a proposal that funding cuts come from this budget to match the modern health landscape.

Former community resources director Sally J. Clark left LLAA to serve on the Seattle City Council.

== Seattle AIDS Walk ==
Lifelong AIDS Alliance is the host of Seattle AIDS Walk.
