= AIDS Foundation Houston =

Nonprofit organization based in Houston, Texas

AIDS Foundation Houston (AFH) is a nonprofit organization based in Houston, Texas which shares HIV prevention education to the community and provides housing, food, and counseling services to HIV-positive low-income persons.

== History ==
A group of individuals in Texas first met in 1981 to address a newly realized epidemic, Gay Related Immuno Deficiency, or GRIDS (renamed AIDS by the Centers for Disease Control in 1982). The community members gathered clothing and food to care for those affected.

The KS/AIDS Foundation Houston (later incorporated as the AIDS Foundation Houston) was officially established in June 1982, shortly after the discovery of AIDS, to improve the lives of those living with HIV and educate non-affected persons to reduce social stigma.

The AFH provides for about 7,000 people annually in the Houston area.

== Housing and care services ==
The AFH's nonprofit services include: case management, temporary and permanent housing, and food assistance. Support services are provided to those who seek to improve their lives. Housing services include essentials and allow individuals to focus on doctor's visits and personal needs to improve his or her health. Plans are individualized arranged to attend to family issues, personal needs, and substance abuse treatment.

== Prevention and community services ==
The AIDS Foundation Houston reaches out education efforts, especially to those at high risk including young adults, African Americans, and those within the LGBT community. Outreach efforts have included the Hip Hop for HIV Awareness, the T.R.U.T.H. Project, and the AFH Prison Initiative which volunteers over 1,500 trained educators who speak with 80,000 of the most at-risk population living incarcerated. Work involving the AFH Prison Initiative's Project Wall Talk has garnered accolades by the Governor's Criminal Justice Volunteer Service Award, received Thursday, April 17, 2014 in Austin, Texas.
