= International Society for Bipolar Disorders =

Medical organization

ISBD logo

The International Society for Bipolar Disorders (ISBD) is a nonprofit organization based in Pittsburgh, Pennsylvania, where it was founded June 17, 1999. The society focuses on research and education in bipolar disorders.

The society has a membership consisting of mental health professionals and patients and their family members representing 50 countries. The mission of the society is to advance the treatment of all aspects of bipolar disorder, thereby improving patient outcomes and quality of life, through fostering international collaboration in education and research. The society hosts biennial professional meetings and offers educational programs. The official journal of the society is Bipolar Disorders and a subscription is included with membership.

== History ==
The ISBD was founded at the 3rd International Conference on Bipolar Disorder, in Pittsburgh, Pennsylvania, in June 1999 by David J. Kupfer and Thomas Detre (University of Pittsburgh Medical Center). In September 1999, the official peer-reviewed society journal, Bipolar Disorders, published its first issue.

The ISBD held its first meeting in Sydney, Australia, in February 2004 with over 400 participants in attendance. The society held its second meeting in August 2006 in Edinburgh, Scotland, with over 600 attendees. As of 2013, the society has over 800 members in 50 countries with an elected board representing 15 countries. The president is Willem Nolen.

== Educational programs ==
The society supports the following educational initiatives:

- The Psychiatric Trainee Support program offers psychiatric trainees a free two-year membership in the society in order to enhance knowledge of bipolar disorder among this group, narrow the gap between bipolar research and clinical practice, and ultimately to improve diagnosis, treatment and outcomes for patients with bipolar disorder. These supported memberships are open to psychiatric residents, postgraduate students and junior faculty up to the Assistant Professor or equivalent level with less than five years as faculty in their career trajectory. The programs seek to support 70% of trainees from developing countries.
- The Samuel Gershon Awards for Junior Investigators, named in honor of Samuel Gershon, past ISBD President and pioneer of early lithium research, offer four awards for original research submissions. Awards are based on the originality of the content, as well as the significance of the findings reported, and are evaluated by an international scientific panel under the auspices of the ISBD. These awards are open to psychiatric trainees, postgraduate students and junior faculty up to the assistant professor rank from around the world. The awards are presented in conjunction with the society's biennial meeting where the winners present their research in a special session showcasing the work of junior people in the field.
- The ISBD Research Fellowship for Junior Investigators provides an opportunity for the recipient to travel to another facility to get training in a particular type of research methodology (i.e. brain imaging, genetics, clinical trials, etc.). The fellowship is intended to cover up to six months support for salary, travel, or some combination of these costs as they are incurred in pursuit of additional training. This could take the form of summer programs, participation in smaller prospective studies, or through some other opportunity.

== Conferences ==
The society organizes biennial meetings that provides updates on topics such as epidemiology, pharmacotherapy, psychotherapies, genetics, neurobiology, imaging research, and bipolar disorder in special populations.

== See also ==
- Depression and Bipolar Support Alliance (DBSA)
- Collaborative RESearch Team to study psychosocial issues in Bipolar Disorder (CREST.BD)
- Bipolar UK
- Outline of bipolar disorder
