= Depression and Bipolar Support Alliance =

Support group organization

The Depression and Bipolar Support Alliance (DBSA), formerly the National Depressive and Manic Depressive Association (NDMDA), is a nonprofit organization providing support groups for people who live with depression or bipolar disorder as well as their friends and family. DBSA's scope also includes outreach, education and advocacy regarding depression and bipolar disorder. DBSA employs a small staff and operates with the guidance of a Scientific Advisory Board.

DBSA sponsors online and "face to face" support groups. A nonrandomized study found participants in such groups reported their coping skills, medication compliance, and acceptance of their illness correlated with participation. Member hospitalization decreased by 49% (from 82% to 33%). Following an initial meeting, members were found to be 6.8 times more likely to attend subsequent meetings if accompanied by a member the first time.

DBSA is a 501(c)(3) not-for-profit organization. Each month, DBSA distributes nearly 20,000 educational materials free of charge to anyone requesting information about mood disorders. DBSA reaches nearly five million people through their educational materials and programs, exhibit materials, and media activities. DBSA has more than 200 chapters with approximately 700 support groups. DBSA is the largest patient-run organization for a specific illness in the United States.

There is an association between attendance at DBSA meetings and improvements in functioning and well-being among meeting participants.

== See also ==
- National Alliance on Mental Illness – Organizes support groups in the United States
- Bipolar UK – Organizes support groups for bipolar disorder in the United Kingdom
- International Society for Bipolar Disorders – Research and educational organization
- Major depressive disorder
- Bipolar disorder
- Outline of bipolar disorder
