= Phineas and Ferb: Day of Doofenshmirtz =

Video Game

- Developer: Virtual Toys
- Publisher: Disney Interactive Studios
- Series: Phineas and Ferb
- Platform: PlayStation Vita
- Release: PlayStation Vita: EU/NA: 4 November 2015
- Genre: Action-adventure

Phineas and Ferb: Day of Doofenshmirtz is a video game based on Phineas and Ferb. It was released for PlayStation Vita on 4 November 2015. in Europe and North America. It is the only one to be released after the series originally ended.

== Gameplay ==
Phineas and Ferb: Day of Doofenshmirtz is an Action-adventure game where players can play as Phineas, Ferb and Perry. The game is focused on exploring 3D environments and using weapons to defeat the minions of the Dr. Doofenshmirtz. The players can also play minigames and face boss encounters

== Plot ==
Dr. Doofenshmirtz created a special beam that turns inanimate objects into troops to form his army. Phineas and Ferb have to defeat the doctor and his minions to save the city of Danville..

== Reception ==
Reception

Aggregate score
Aggregator	Score
Metacritic	60/100

Review scores
Publication	Score
Push Square	"Average" 5/10
Gaming Age	C (≈5/10)

According to Push Square and Gaming Age the game is quite mediocre and, although described as fairly enjoyable to play, in particular if you're a fan of Phineas and Ferb, it is criticized for its repetitive and frustrating gameplay, mechanics and level design choices.
