= Phineas and Ferb: Star Wars =

- Phineas and Ferb episodes
- The logo used for the special
- Episode nos.: Season 4 Episodes 31/32
- Directed by: Robert F. Hughes; Sue Perrotto
- Story by: Dani Vetere; Jim Bernstein; Martin Olson; Scott Peterson
- Teleplay by: Kyle Menke; John Mathot; Mike Bell; Michael Diederich; Michael B. Singleton; Edward Rivera; Patrick O'Connor; J.G. Orrantia; Eddie Pittman
- Production code: 433–434
- Original air dates: July 26, 2014 (Disney Channel); August 4, 2014 (Disney XD)

Guest appearances
- Simon Pegg as Candace's commanding officer/C-3PO; Adam Savage and Jamie Hyneman as Office Stormtroopers

Episode chronology
← Previous "Mandace"	Next → "Lost in Danville"
- Phineas and Ferb (season 4)

"Phineas and Ferb: Star Wars" (also titled "Episode IVa: May the Ferb Be with You") is a one-hour long crossover episode of the American animated series Phineas and Ferb, featuring characters from Star Wars. The 31st and 32nd episodes, as well as the 41st broadcast episode of the fourth season, the 215th episode segment broadcast and the 131st and 132nd episodes overall of the series, it aired on July 26, 2014, on Disney Channel and later on Disney XD on August 4, 2014. The episode's plot, while not considered canon in the Star Wars timeline, is a retelling of the 1977 film Star Wars: Episode IV – A New Hope in the style of Rosencrantz and Guildenstern Are Dead, where the Phineas and Ferb characters interact with the Star Wars characters.

== Plot ==
External videos
- Star Wars S4 E40 Full Episode Phineas and Ferb @disneychannel — Official upload of the episode onto YouTube

Perry the "Rebelpus" breaks into the Imperial Corporate Offices, steals a disc containing the plans for the Death Star, and rendezvouses with Princess Leia's ship. Meanwhile, on the planet Tatooine, Phineas Flynn and Ferb Fletcher live with their parents as contented moisture farmers. Darth Vader's Star Destroyer intercepts Leia's ship, forcing her to load the disc into R2-D2, but she is observed by a trio of Imperial stormtroopers composed of Candace Flynn, Baljeet Rai, and Buford Van Stomm. Candace attempts to report the actions of the Rebels to the empire but is put down by her commanding officer. After seeing R2-D2 and C-3PO entering an escape pod, the trio decide to pursue them in a second escape pod and prove their worth by recapturing the lost plans, with Perry secretly hitching a ride with them.

Elsewhere, Darthenshmirtz arrives with his robotic underling Norm-3P0 at the Death Star. He reveals that he has a new invention that is even more evil, but that requires the Force to power it. Candace, Baljeet, and Buford are on the trail of the droids until their commander sends them into Mos Eisley. Perry continues trailing the droids as they are seized by Jawas and sold to Owen Lars, and eventually absconds with R2-D2. They run into Phineas and Ferb on their way to Obi-Wan Kenobi's, whom Phineas and Ferb are acquainted with as he has given them instruction in the Jedi arts. Despite their offer of a ride, R2-D2 continues on his own while Perry remains unseen by the duo, unaware that their collision has resulted in the Death Star disc remaining in the back seat of Phineas and Ferb's speeder.

Upon discovering the disc, Phineas and Ferb set out to return it to R2-D2, which takes them to Mos Eisley where they encounter Watto's son Blatto. With Blatto's help they discover that the disc contains the Death Star plans, and they are pursued after being spotted by Candace, Baljeet, and Buford. The brothers just miss R2-D2 departing with Luke, Obi-Wan, C-3PO, Han Solo, and Chewbacca aboard the Millennium Falcon. Determined to return the disc, the pair travel to the Mos Eisley cantina and are introduced to Isabella Garcia-Shapiro, captain of the Centennial Chihuahua and an rival of Han Solo's. Isabella agrees to transport them; meanwhile, Candace, Baljeet, and Buford return to the Death Star. Separately aboard, Darthenshmirtz learns that he can extract Force energy from Darth Vader's trash just before the planet Alderaan is destroyed. The Chihuahua catches up to the Millennium Falcon, but both end up caught in a tractor beam; the Chihuahua is freed after Phineas and Ferb modify the ship so that it can take on the appearance of a doughnut-selling spaceship.

Once aboard the Death Star, Phineas and Ferb are surprised and delighted to run into Perry, who was their pet before they discovered him to be a rebel agent, an event that initially upset them but that they have come to terms with. Perry makes his way to Darthenshmirtz's lair, only to end up encased in carbonite and left helpless as Darthenshmirtz unveils his new Sith-inator, a machine that will make him a Sith Lord even more evil than Vader. Ferb, sensing through the Force that Perry is in danger, leaves Phineas and Isabella to go to his aid, unknowingly passing Obi-Wan Kenobi on the way. He then knocks Perry's carbonite slab out of the way of a blast from the Sith-inator only to be hit himself, which begins his transformation into a Sith by giving him yellow irises (identical to Anakin Skywalker's transformation in Star Wars: Episode III – Revenge of the Sith). Elsewhere, Isabella and Phineas run into Candace, who pursues them, only to be saved from a fatal fall by Phineas, which causes her to rethink her stance on the Rebels. Darthenshmirtz is then attacked by a freed Perry, while Phineas gives Isabella the Death Star disc to take to the Rebels while he goes looking for Ferb.

Entering Darthenshmirtz's lair, Phineas discovers an upgraded Sith-inator and Ferb, who has taken on an appearance similar to that of Darth Maul. Upon learning that his brother intends to create an army of Sith and rule the dark side, Phineas reluctantly confronts him in a lightsaber duel, in which both of them upgrade their lightsabers to possess multiple blades. Isabella travels to Yavin and delivers the Death Star plans, but despite the appeals of the Firestar Girls (Rebel versions of the Fireside Girls) refuses to join the Rebel Alliance. She changes her mind after a tense conversation with Han and Chewbacca, also convincing him to return to the rebels to help Luke; back on the Death Star, Candace, Baljeet, and Buford likewise decide to join the rebellion. The battles between Perry and Darthenshmirtz and Phineas and Ferb continue and intersect, until Candace comes to Phineas' aid. Together they manage to destroy the Sith-inator, which restores Ferb to normal, and the trio—along with Baljeet and Buford—depart to get to the bus that brought the stormtroopers to the Death Star, but it leaves before they can get on it. Perry also leaves with a carbonite-encased Darthenshmirtz, while the rebels begin their attack on the Death Star.

Left stranded on the doomed battle station, Candace learns that Phineas is her baby brother and that their mother remarried, making Ferb their stepbrother. Before Phineas can expound on the subject, the Death Star detonates (a nod to the creator's decision not to touch on the history of who Phineas' father is). Fortunately, Isabella returns in the nick of time and saves the group, while the Firestar Girls rescue all of the civilian personnel from the Death Star. Darthenshmirtz escapes Perry's ship on a small escape pod, while Perry makes his way to Yavin to join the celebration attending the Death Star's destruction. The rebels then enjoy a dance party during which Isabella kisses Phineas.

== Production ==
After production on "Phineas and Ferb: Mission Marvel" was complete, the Walt Disney Company purchased Lucasfilm Ltd. for US$4.05 billion. After co-creator Dan Povenmire heard this news, he did a doodle of Doofenshmirtz dressed as Darth Vader, texted it to the head of Disney Television Animation and wrote, "I smell crossover!" Much like "Mission Marvel", this crossover episode was announced at San Diego Comic-Con in 2013. Povenmire said, "May the 'Ferb' be with you and with all of us who for decades have dreamt of a chance to work with the great characters and stories of Star Wars."

Christopher Corey Smith voiced Luke Skywalker as well as the Toydarian, Blatto, the son of Watto from Star Wars: Episode I – The Phantom Menace; Ross Marquand voiced Han Solo; April Winchell voiced Princess Leia; writer Eddie Pittman provided one line as Darth Vader; regular Perry the Platypus voice actor Dee Bradley Baker also voiced Chewbacca; comedian Simon Pegg provided the voice of C-3PO as well as the voice of Candace's unnamed commanding officer; and Mythbusters hosts Adam Savage and Jamie Hyneman cameo as the voices of two Stormtroopers.

== Soundtrack ==
Phineas and Ferb: Star Wars

Soundtrack album EP by Cast - Phineas and Ferb
- Released: July 22, 2014
- Recorded: 2013–2014
- Genre: Soundtrack
- Length: 10:42
- Label: Walt Disney

Cast - Phineas and Ferb chronology
Phineas and Ferb: Rockin' and Rollin'	Phineas and Ferb: Star Wars	Phineas and Ferb: Last Day of Summer

On July 22, 2014, a soundtrack EP containing the songs from the special was released for purchase on Amazon Music, and was later released on iTunes and Apple Music.

In addition the original Star Wars themes by John Williams were used in the special episode although they were not present in the official soundtrack.

=== Track listing ===
No.	Title	Writer(s)	Performer(s)	Length
1.	"Tatooine"	Dan Povenmire, Jeff "Swampy" Marsh, Martin Olson, Robert F. Hughes	Phineas and Ferb	2:33
2.	"In the Empire"	Povenmire, Marsh, Wayne Brady, Olson	Candace, Buford and Baljeet	2:14
3.	"I'm Feelin' So Low"	Marsh, Povenmire, Olivia Olson, Olson	Vanessa the Twi'Lek	1:42
4.	"Sith-Inator"	Hughes, Marsh, Olson, Povenmire, Randy Rogel	Darthenshmirtz	1:48
5.	"Rebel, Let's Go!"	Povenmire, Marsh, Olson, Hughes	Vanessa the Twi'Lek	2:25
Total length:				10:42

== Reception ==
=== Viewership ===
The special was viewed by 2.5 million viewers.

=== Critical reception ===
Nerdist's Amy Ratcliffe stated "The mix proves to be an amusing one, and you don't have to be familiar with Phineas and Ferb to enjoy the mash-up." Matt Blum from GeekDad called it "one of the best Star Wars cartoons ever, and a terrific episode of Phineas and Ferb as well". Rick Ellis of Allyourscreens.com wrote that the special "retains the best of Phineas and Ferb while including an impressively funny collection of Star Wars references, inside jokes and facts that only a hardcore fan might catch".

== Broadcast ==
Before the premiere, the episode was made available to verified users of the Watch Disney Channel app as well as Disney XD on Demand on July 19, 2014. The special premiered in the United States on Disney Channel on July 26, 2014 and premiered on Disney XD on August 4, 2014 and on Disney Channel Australia and New Zealand and Disney XD Australia. In Canada, the special premiered on August 8, 2014 on Family Channel and premiered on August 17, 2014 on Disney XD. In Southeast Asia, a release date of August 17, 2014 was announced.

== DVD release ==
DVD name	Ep #	Release date	Included episodes
Phineas and Ferb: Star Wars	6	November 11, 2014	"Phineas and Ferb: Star Wars"; "For Your Ice Only / Happy New Year!"; "Steampunx / It's No Picnic"; "Terrifying Tri-State Trilogy of Terror"; "Doof 101 / Father's Day"; "Tales from the Resistance: Back to the 2nd Dimension"
