= Phineas and Ferb season 4 =

Phineas and Ferb
- Season 4
- Showrunners: Dan Povenmire; Jeff "Swampy" Marsh
- No. of episodes: 37 (49 segments)

Release
- Original network: Disney Channel; Disney XD
- Original release: December 7, 2012 – June 12, 2015

Season chronology
- ← Previous; Season 3 Next → Season 5

The fourth season of Phineas and Ferb first aired on Disney Channel on December 7, 2012, and December 31, 2012, on Disney XD. The series centers on stepbrothers Phineas Flynn and Ferb Fletcher trying to make every day of their summer vacation the best ever, while their older sister Candace Flynn tries to bust them. Other main characters include secret agent Perry the Platypus (who is also Phineas and Ferb's pet) and the evil scientist Dr. Heinz Doofenshmirtz. This was the final season of the series until it was revived in 2023, when two additional seasons were ordered.

== Production ==
On August 25, 2011, the series was renewed for a fourth season as part of a deal between Dan Povenmire, Jeff "Swampy" Marsh, and Disney, along with a feature film and possible spin-off. On November 9, 2011, the season was officially picked up, with new episodes rolling out until 2014. Disney, the owner of Marvel Entertainment since 2009, announced that the Marvel heroes Spider-Man, Iron Man, Hulk, and Thor would appear on a crossover episode, which premiered on August 16, 2013. On February 15, 2014, it was announced that work on this season was complete and the show will go on an indefinite hiatus. However, Dan Povenmire mentioned the crew was now working on new episodes. In a July 2014 article on The Daily Beast, Povenmire said they were finishing up 20 episodes that have yet to air. The episode "Doof 101" was intended as a backdoor pilot for a spin-off series that focused on Dr. Doofenshmirtz becoming a high school science teacher, but was not picked up. On May 7, 2015, it was announced that the fourth season would be the series' final season and the finale, titled "Last Day of Summer", would air on June 12, 2015. A stand-alone special titled "The O.W.C.A. Files" aired on November 9, 2015, on Disney XD and on January 15, 2016, on Disney Channel. In January 2023, Disney revived the series and ordered two additional seasons. The fifth season premiered on June 5, 2025.

== Episodes ==
No. overall	No. in season	Title	Directed by	Written and storyboarded by	Story by	Original release date	Prod. code	U.S. viewers (millions)
101	1	"Fly on the Wall"	Sue Perrotto	Aliki Theofilopoulos Grafft & John Mathot	Jim Bernstein	January 11, 2013	401	3.39
101	1	"My Sweet Ride"	Robert F. Hughes	Chris Headrick & Mike Diederich	Dani Vetere	February 1, 2013	401	3.77
While Phineas and Ferb build a giant tire swing, Buford removes a crucial part, accidentally turning Candace into a fly. Meanwhile, Doofenshmirtz struggles with a serious case of "evil scientist's block" as he tries to devise a new evil scheme. Phineas and Ferb fix up a vintage car for Candace for Danville's Doo Wop Hop car show, while Doofenshmirtz tries to sabotage the event by turning the other cars to dust with his "Rust-inator".
102	2	"For Your Ice Only"	Robert F. Hughes	Eddie Pittman & Joshua Pruett	Scott Peterson	December 7, 2012	402	3.70
102	2	"Happy New Year!"	Sue Perrotto	Antoine Guilbaud & Kaz	Dani Vetere	December 7, 2012	402	3.70
Former National Hockey League star Luc Robitaille offers his assistance when Phineas and Ferb take an ice hockey game to the extreme. Meanwhile, Doofenshmirtz builds an "Abominable-inator" to make himself bigger, scarier and hairier. Phineas and Ferb plan their own New Year's Eve ball drop, complete with a customized multi-dimensional ball, while Candace makes it her resolution to refrain from busting her brothers before the clock hits midnight. Meanwhile, Doofenshmirtz tries to use a "Resolution-Changer-Inator" bow-tie to change people's resolutions to helping make him leader of the Tri-State Area.
103	3	"Bully Bust"	Sue Perrotto	Bernie Petterson & J. G. Orrantia	Jim Bernstein	January 18, 2013	403	2.99
103	3	"Backyard Hodge Podge"	Sue Perrotto	Aliki Theofilopoulos Grafft & John Mathot	Dani Vetere	April 19, 2013	403	2.59
Candace challenges Buford to keep Phineas and Ferb's invention from disappearing so that she can sweep in and casually bust her brothers. Across town, Doofenshmirtz has had one too many lattes and is experiencing an extra burst of evil energy. Phineas and Ferb create a new invention using recycled parts from past projects.
104	4	"Der Kinderlumper"	Robert F. Hughes	Michael B. Singleton & Mike Diederich	Jim Bernstein	February 15, 2013	404	3.14
104	4	"Just Desserts"	Robert F. Hughes	Kaz & Kim Roberson	Dani Vetere	July 5, 2013	404	2.64
Phineas and Ferb create Rutabega-themed vehicles when Candace is chosen to be Rutabega princess and gets to start the "Running of the Chinchillas". Across town, Doofenshmirtz plans to turn himself into a real live Kinderlumper to scare Roger into relinquishing control of the Tri-State Area over to him. Candace volunteers to help Isabella record her audio book so Phineas and Ferb can continue building their giant, recyclable, rock climbing project as planned, and get busted by their mother. Meanwhile, Doofenshmirtz creates a "Bring-Out-Dessert-Inator" which gets people to interrupt what they are doing and bring out dessert.
105	5	"Bee Day"	Sue Perrotto	Antoine Guilbaud & Kaz	Dani Vetere	April 26, 2013	405	2.44
105	5	"Bee Story"	Sue Perrotto	Bernie Petterson & J. G. Orrantia	Dani Vetere	April 26, 2013	405	2.44
After Linda reminisces about old times, Phineas and Ferb make a giant inflatable wading pool. Meanwhile, Candace reveals her "Emo" side, and Doofenshmirtz attempts to become ruler of all bees. Isabella and the Fireside Girls attempt to get their Bee Keeping patch by turning themselves into bees, and Poofenplotz tries to become Queen of the World by stealing and consuming massive amounts of royal jelly. Absent: Candace Flynn
106	6	"Sidetracked" (Note: This episode is a half-hour special.)	Robert F. Hughes & Sue Perrotto	Kaz, Kim Roberson, Aliki Theofilopoulos Grafft & John Mathot	Dani Vetere & Scott Peterson	March 1, 2013	406	2.98
Perry teams up with a human agent named Lyla, to stop a hijacked train running along the U.S./Canada border. In a past mission, they had a falling out, so Perry must decide whether or not he can trust Lyla and her unique sense of logic to get them through the mission, defeat Doofenshmirtz and save the train's passengers and Canada's national treasure – a moose named Albert.
107	7	"Knot My Problem"	Sue Perrotto	Antoine Guilbaud & Kaz	Dani Vetere	July 5, 2013	407	2.64
107	7	"Mind Share"	Robert F. Hughes	Michael B. Singleton & Mike Diederich	Martin Olson	April 5, 2013	407	3.24
Candace thinks her day will be easy when Phineas and Ferb actually ask her to get Mom if they get stuck in their gigantic reproduction of the Gordian Knot, but when Jeremy stops by and asks for her help to open his personal mini safe, she finds her day getting a little more complicated. Meanwhile, Doofenshmirtz plans to eliminate every all-you-can-eat buffet in the Tri-State Area with his "Eat-It-All-Inator". The gang switches bodies with alien tourists only to realize they were actually duped by criminals, stranded in the alien prison. Meanwhile, Doofenshmirtz tries to impress a girl named Rosie by making special boots that would make him the perfect square dancer.
108	8	"Primal Perry"	Robert F. Hughes	Joshua Pruett & Kyle Menke	Jim Bernstein, Martin Olson & Scott Peterson	March 2, 2013 (Note: This episode premiered on Disney XD prior to Disney Channel. The episode premiered on Disney Channel on May 17, 2013.)	408	N/A
Perry must escape Liam, an Australian platypus hunter who is out to destroy him, rescue Doofenshmirtz from the error of his ways and maintain the sanctity of the Danville Botanical Gardens. Meanwhile, Phineas and Ferb create an "infinite probability generator" that allows Baljeet to make as many choices as he pleases without being affected by the consequences. This proves to be disastrous for Buford as the over 30 Baljeets, each with a grudge, form a mob and begin to terrorize and bully him.
109	9	"La Candace-Cabra"	Sue Perrotto	Bernie Petterson & J. G. Orrantia	Jonathan Howard	July 12, 2013	409	2.69
109	9	"Happy Birthday, Isabella"	Robert F. Hughes	Kaz & Kim Roberson	Scott Peterson	July 12, 2013	409	2.69
Phineas and Ferb set out to prove the existence of the elusive Chupacabra to the world, but Candace cannot stand the wait and needs to first just prove it to her mother. Meanwhile, Doofenshmirtz has the brilliant idea to use his "Switch-Place-Inator" to remove hair from one person and give it to another so that he can in turn sell his hair growing tonic. Phineas, Ferb, and the gang celebrate Isabella's birthday in a big way, but all she really wants is some quiet time with Phineas. Meanwhile, Doofenshmirtz has installed his "Bugs Me-Inator" onto an evil bug bus and is driving around Danville turning all the things that bug him literally into bugs.
110	10	"Great Balls of Water"	Sue Perrotto	Aliki Theofilopoulos Grafft & John Mathot	Jim Bernstein	June 7, 2013	410	3.29
110	10	"Where's Pinky?"	Robert F. Hughes	Eddie Pittman & Joshua Pruett	Dani Vetere, Jim Bernstein & Martin Olson	June 7, 2013	410	3.29
When Candace thinks Jeremy is bored with their usual hangouts, she sets out to find something unique to do with him. Meanwhile, Phineas and Ferb power through town surfing on a giant ball of water and Doofenshmirtz plans to use his "Double-Negative-Inator" to confuse his local eatery into giving him a wintery drink that is usually not served during summer. When Pinky goes missing, Phineas and Ferb create a machine that will amplify Buford's senses to those of a dog's. However, it works so well that the animal agents' secret identities are put in jeopardy. Meanwhile, Candace tries to meet up with Jeremy for lunch at City Hall but gets stuck in a mandatory tour.
111	11	"Phineas and Ferb: Mission Marvel" (Note: This episode is a one-hour special.)	Robert F. Hughes & Sue Perrotto	Kyle Menke, Joshua Pruett, Kim Roberson, Kaz, J. G. Orrantia, Eddie Pittman, Bernie Petterson & Antoine Guilbaud	Dani Vetere, Jim Bernstein, Martin Olson & Scott Peterson	August 16, 2013	411	3.76
112	12	"Phineas and Ferb: Mission Marvel"	Robert F. Hughes & Sue Perrotto	Kyle Menke, Joshua Pruett, Kim Roberson, Kaz, J. G. Orrantia, Eddie Pittman, Bernie Petterson & Antoine Guilbaud	Dani Vetere, Jim Bernstein, Martin Olson & Scott Peterson	August 16, 2013	412	3.76
Doofenshmirtz creates an invention that accidentally de-powers Spider-Man, Iron Man, the Hulk and Thor. The powerless heroes travel to Danville to get Phineas and Ferb to help them stop Red Skull, M.O.D.O.K., Whiplash, and Venom, who have tricked Doofenshmirtz to destroy the city. Candace is thrilled, but her efforts to help the heroes cause more harm than good, while also causing a rift between her and Phineas.
113	13	"Thanks But No Thanks"	Sue Perrotto	Antoine Guilbaud & Kaz	Martin Olson	September 13, 2013	413	2.51
113	13	"Troy Story"	Robert F. Hughes	Mike Diederich & Michael B. Singleton	Jim Bernstein & Scott Peterson	September 20, 2013	413	2.55
After learning about Monty and Vanessa's secret relationship, Carl blackmails Monty into helping him get some much needed acknowledgement from Monogram. Meanwhile, Candace is ecstatic when she discovers that her neighbor Peggy McGee has witnessed all of Phineas and Ferb's summer antics and is happy to tell Linda about them. Meanwhile, Doofenshmirtz creates its "Inflator-inator" to try to silence his neighbor who plays the bagpipes every day. Inspired by Candace's book club selection, The Iliad, Phineas and Ferb reenact the Trojan War, but with their own twist. Meanwhile, Perry discovers that Doofenshmirtz has a major problem with throwing things away so he helps him find his "De-Clutter-inator".
114	14	"Love at First Byte"	Sue Perrotto	Eddie Pittman & J. G. Orrantia	Martin Olson	August 2, 2013	414	2.83
114	14	"One Good Turn"	Robert F. Hughes	Edward Rivera & Mike Diederich	Jim Bernstein	August 9, 2013	414	3.31
When Linda becomes overwhelmed for organizing a block party, she asks Phineas and Ferb for help, much to Candace's dismay. Meanwhile, Norm falls in love with Rodney's female robot. Motivated by a movie with a strong heroine, Candace and Stacy feel empowered to team up against rival groups and compete in Phineas and Ferb's Ultimate Obstacle Course. Across town, Doofenshmirtz plans to humiliate Roger by using his "90 Degree-turn-inator" on him so that he will accidentally insult the Mayor of Stumblegimp and be forced to perform the shameful "Dance of Contrition" to make amends.
115	15	"Cheers for Fears"	Sue Perrotto	Aliki Theofilopoulos Grafft, John Mathot & Kim Roberson	Dani Vetere	November 1, 2013	415	2.41
115	15	"Just Our Luck"	Sue Perrotto	Aliki Theofilopoulos Grafft & John Mathot	Dani Vetere	January 10, 2014	415	1.75
With Stacy's advice, Candace asks Phineas and Ferb to create an oversized book of her special events with Jeremy for his birthday. Also, Perry is after Doofenshmirtz, who stole every horror movie in town to create an -Inator that makes people's greatest fears appear. When Candace is accidentally zapped by Doofenshmirtz's "Stinkelkrampen-inator" (a.k.a. Good Luck-inator), she realizes she has a good chance of busting Phineas and Ferb.
116	16	"Return Policy"	Sue Perrotto	Mike Bell & Patrick O'Connor	Dani Vetere	January 24, 2014	416	2.23
116	16	"Imperfect Storm"	Robert F. Hughes	Bernie Petterson & Joshua Pruett	Martin Olson	June 11, 2014	416	0.44
Phineas and Ferb assemble an extreme batting challenge and Candace finds herself in a predicament involving extreme water sports. Meanwhile, Doofenshmirtz builds a "Back-to-the-store-inator." Phineas and Ferb test kites in the park after inventing a wind-amplification device. Linda gives a makeover to the backyard and Candace thinks she will bust the boys. Meanwhile, Doofenshmirtz builds the "Sog-Inator" to take vengeance on a childhood bully who douses him with a bucket of water.
117	17	"Steampunx"	Robert F. Hughes	Bernie Petterson & Joshua Pruett	Dani Vetere	November 15, 2013	417	1.70
117	17	"It's No Picnic"	Sue Perrotto	J. G. Orrantia & Eddie Pittman	Dani Vetere	June 23, 2014	417	0.48
When Phineas and Ferb discover a commemorative coin from the 1903 Danville World's Fair, they are immediately taken back to the festival where steam-driven devices were introduced and a set of kids who were very much like them were preparing for the highly anticipated event. Meanwhile, Sweary the Swan (Perry) must stop Professor Von Doofenshmirtz from destroying the fair. Isabella plans an impromptu picnic for Phineas when the rest of the gang have plans of their own. Meanwhile, Doofenshmirtz uses a "Teleport-inator" to send his daughter to a movie marathon.
118	18	"Terrifying Tri-State Trilogy of Terror"	Robert F. Hughes	Mike Bell, Kim Roberson, Aliki Theofilopoulos Grafft & John Mathot	Dani Vetere, Martin Olson & Scott Peterson	October 5, 2013	418	3.02
This episode features three separate tales told by a mysterious bookmobile owner: Candace accidentally conjures up a spell that brings her Ducky Momo plushie to life and stalks her.; Doofenshmirtz summons a mythological, giant floating baby head that grants cursed wishes.; Phineas, Ferb, and their friends go up against a horde of evil purple platypuses set on destroying the town.
119	19	"Druselsteinoween"	Robert F. Hughes	Kyle Menke & Mike Diederich	Dani Vetere	October 4, 2013	419	2.65
119	19	"Face Your Fear"	Robert F. Hughes	Bernie Petterson & Joshua Pruett	Martin Olson	October 11, 2013	419	2.14
When Vanessa learns that her father has inherited a Drusselsteinian castle right next door to her she seizes the opportunity to throw the biggest Halloween bash ever. The whole town is there, including Phineas and Ferb, who act as the event's party planners and DJs. Meanwhile, Doofenshmirtz enlists Perry to help him find a large, hidden treasure that his Great Aunt has placed somewhere within the castle. After studying hours of horror movies, Doofenshmirtz develops a theory that enlarging small, cute animals into giant beasts will help him take over the Tri-State Area. However, when he puts his plan into action, he soon realizes it might be too much for him to handle. Meanwhile, Phineas and Ferb make a giant revolving foam city so they can safely perform skateboarding tricks, and Candace's tour of the Danville Space Laboratory gives her an opportunity for a high-tech bust.
120	20	"The Klimpaloon Ultimatum"	Sue Perrotto	Patrick O'Connor, Zac Moncrief, Edward Rivera & Mike Diederich	Dan Povenmire, Dani Vetere, Jim Bernstein, Martin Olson & Scott Peterson	July 7, 2014	420	N/A
Phineas, Ferb, and the gang help Love Händel prove the existence of Klimpaloon, the magical old-timey bathing suit that lives in the Himalayas, to verify that their song, "The Ballad of Klimpaloon", is legitimate.
121	21	"Doof 101"	Robert F. Hughes	Kim Roberson, Zac Moncrief & Dan Povenmire	Dan Povenmire & Jeff "Swampy" Marsh	November 27, 2014 (Note: This episode was first released in Phineas and Ferb: Star Wars DVD on October 21, 2014.)	421	0.24
121	21	"Father's Day"	Sue Perrotto	Edward Rivera & Patrick O'Connor	Scott Peterson	June 10, 2014	421	0.41
Doofenshmirtz gets punished with community service for being evil, and he is forced to be a science teacher at Danville High School, much to Vanessa's dismay. Guest stars: J. K. Simmons as Napoleon, Josh Gad as Wendell, Stephen Root as Lloyd, and Gary Cole as Principal Lang Perry helps Doofenshmirtz in retrieving his father's old lawn gnome. Meanwhile, Phineas and Ferb help out their father on Father's Day.
122	22	"Operation Crumb Cake"	Robert F. Hughes	Kim Roberson & Mike Bell	Dani Vetere	July 14, 2014	422	0.48
122	22	"Mandace"	Sue Perrotto	Aliki Theofilopoulos Grafft & John Mathot	Jim Bernstein	July 14, 2014	422	0.48
Isabella unintentionally admits her feelings for Phineas in a letter, so she and the Fireside Girls have to grab the letter before Phineas reads it. Meanwhile, Doofenshmirtz invents the "Unretrograde-inator" to help change his misfortune. Candace is accidentally hit by Doofenshmirtz’s "Impersonator-inator", which changes her appearance to a pizza delivery guy, but uses this appearance to help her better understand boys.
123	23	"Tales from the Resistance: Back to the 2nd Dimension"	Robert F. Hughes	Joshua Pruett, Mike Bell, Kyle Menke & Mike Diederich	Jim Bernstein	November 25, 2014	423	0.54
Two months after the events of Across the 2nd Dimension, there is a new threat in the 2nd Dimension, and this dimension's Phineas, Ferb, Candace, and the resistance must work together to defeat this evil.
124	24	"The Return of the Rogue Rabbit"	Robert F. Hughes	Michael B. Singleton & Mike Diederich	Scott Peterson	June 16, 2014	424	0.29
124	24	"Live and Let Drive"	Sue Perrotto	Eddie Pittman & J. G. Orrantia	Jeff "Swampy" Marsh, Jim Bernstein, Martin Olson & Scott Peterson	March 1, 2014 (Note: Beginning with this episode, new episodes premiered on Disney XD prior to Disney Channel.)	424	0.41
Doofenshmirtz helps rogue O.W.C.A. agent Dennis the Bunny escape prison. Meanwhile, Phineas and Ferb make some improvements on the Fireside Girls' marionette show. Doofenshmirtz blasts the favorite to win the Montevillebad Grand Prix with his "I-Don't-Care-inator" so that he has a better chance of winning the race himself. However, he finds himself racing against Perry. Guest stars: Jeremy Clarkson, Richard Hammond, and James May as themselves
125	25	"Lost in Danville"	Sue Perrotto	Eddie Pittman & J. G. Orrantia	Damon Lindelof	September 29, 2014	425	0.54
125	25	"The Inator Method"	Sue Perrotto	Edward Rivera & Patrick O'Connor	Dani Vetere	September 29, 2014	425	0.54
Phineas and Ferb try to open a capsule that falls from the sky. Meanwhile, Doofenshmirtz gets kidnapped by an evil scientist named Professor Mystery and learns that Peter the Panda is Professor Mystery's nemesis. Guest star: Terry O'Quinn as Professor Mystery Doofenshmirtz teaches a seminar called "The -Inator Method". Meanwhile, Phineas and Ferb host an interplanetary race while Candace tries to multitask at the same time as playing an MMORPG entitled Ducky Momo's Golden Quest.
126	26	"Act Your Age"	Robert F. Hughes	Bernie Petterson & Kim Roberson	Dani Vetere	February 9, 2015	426	0.71
Set ten years in the future, a teenaged Phineas is making a decision about which college to attend when he suddenly gets some news about Isabella. Meanwhile, Doofenshmirtz suffers a midlife crisis.
127	27	"Phineas and Ferb Save Summer"	Robert F. Hughes & Sue Perrotto	J. G. Orrantia, Eddie Pittman, Aliki Theofilopoulos Grafft, Joshua Pruett, John Mathot, Mike Bell, Kyle Menke & Mike Diederich	Dani Vetere, Jim Bernstein, Martin Olson & Scott Peterson	June 9, 2014 (Note: This episode was available on Watch Disney XD and Disney XD On Demand on May 21, 2014.)	427	0.56
128	28	"Phineas and Ferb Save Summer"	Robert F. Hughes & Sue Perrotto	J. G. Orrantia, Eddie Pittman, Aliki Theofilopoulos Grafft, Joshua Pruett, John Mathot, Mike Bell, Kyle Menke & Mike Diederich	Dani Vetere, Jim Bernstein, Martin Olson & Scott Peterson	June 9, 2014	428	0.56
Doofenshmirtz’s latest -Inator changes the way the Earth moves, and it is up to Phineas, Ferb, and the gang to save summer.
129	29	"Night of the Living Pharmacists"	Sue Perrotto & Robert F. Hughes	Eddie Pittman, Kim Roberson, Bernie Petterson, Patrick O'Connor, J. G. Orrantia, Joshua Pruett, Edward Rivera, Aliki Theofilopoulos Grafft & Kyle Menke	Joshua Pruett, Scott Peterson, Jim Bernstein & Dani Vetere	October 4, 2014 (Note: This episode premiered on Disney Channel prior to Disney XD. The episode premiered on Disney XD on October 10, 2014.)	429	2.34
130	30	"Night of the Living Pharmacists"	Sue Perrotto & Robert F. Hughes	Eddie Pittman, Kim Roberson, Bernie Petterson, Patrick O'Connor, J. G. Orrantia, Joshua Pruett, Edward Rivera, Aliki Theofilopoulos Grafft & Kyle Menke	Joshua Pruett, Scott Peterson, Jim Bernstein & Dani Vetere	October 4, 2014	430	2.34
Danville is invaded by a myriad of zombie-like duplicates of Doofenshmirtz. Guest stars: Simon Pegg and Nick Frost as Shaun and Ed from Shaun of the Dead
131	31	"Phineas and Ferb: Star Wars"	Robert F. Hughes & Sue Perrotto	Kyle Menke, John Mathot, Mike Bell, Mike Diederich, Michael B. Singleton, Edward Rivera, Patrick O'Connor, J. G. Orrantia & Eddie Pittman	Dani Vetere, Jim Bernstein, Martin Olson & Scott Peterson	July 26, 2014 (Note: This episode premiered on Disney Channel prior to Disney XD. The episode premiered on Disney XD on August 4, 2014.)	431	2.48
132	32	"Phineas and Ferb: Star Wars"	Robert F. Hughes & Sue Perrotto	Kyle Menke, John Mathot, Mike Bell, Mike Diederich, Michael B. Singleton, Edward Rivera, Patrick O'Connor, J. G. Orrantia & Eddie Pittman	Dani Vetere, Jim Bernstein, Martin Olson & Scott Peterson	July 26, 2014	432	2.48
Phineas and Ferb live on Tatooine, one moisture farm away from Luke Skywalker. The Death Star plans accidentally fall into their hands, and Stormtrooper Candace (backed up by Stormtroopers Buford and Baljeet) attempts to bust them as they try to return the plans to R2-D2. Meanwhile, Darthenshmirtz, the lowest of the Darths, creates a Sith-inator to make himself more evil, but it accidentally strikes Ferb. Guest star: Simon Pegg as C-3PO
133	33	"Last Day of Summer"	Sue Perrotto & Robert F. Hughes	Aliki Theofilopoulos, Bernie Petterson, Calvin Suggs, John Mathot, Joshua Pruett, Kaz, Kim Roberson & Mike Diederich	Dani Vetere, Scott Peterson, Jim Bernstein & Martin Olson	June 12, 2015 (Note: This episode premiered on Disney Channel and Disney XD simultaneously.)	433	2.94
134	34	"Last Day of Summer"	Sue Perrotto & Robert F. Hughes	Aliki Theofilopoulos, Bernie Petterson, Calvin Suggs, John Mathot, Joshua Pruett, Kaz, Kim Roberson & Mike Diederich	Dani Vetere, Scott Peterson, Jim Bernstein & Martin Olson	June 12, 2015	434	2.94
The last day of summer approaches, and Candace has a last chance to bust Phineas and Ferb one more time. She is quickly foiled, but is presented with an opportunity to redo the day when she sets off Doofenshmirtz's "Do-Over-Inator". Note: This episode was the series finale in its original run and takes place after the events of Candace Against the Universe.
135	35	"Phineas and Ferb's Musical Cliptastic Countdown Hosted by Kelly Osbourne" (Note: This episode is a 45-minute special.)	Kim Roberson (uncredited)	Written by : Bobby Gaylor (uncredited)	-	June 28, 2013	435	3.12
Doofenshmirtz and Major Monogram have their hearts set on revealing the top 10 musical numbers from Seasons 2 and 3, but soon find out that celebrity host Kelly Osbourne has been brought in to fill the role. Unwilling to submit to playing second fiddle, Doofenshmirtz makes it his mission to thwart Kelly until Perry sets out to stop his nemesis from ruining the entire show. Note: This is the only episode that is not available on Disney+. However, it is available to purchase on Apple TV.
136	36	"O.W.C.A. Files"	Robert F. Hughes	Aliki Theofilopoulos, Bernie Petterson, Calvin Suggs, Eddie Pittman, John Mathot, Kim Roberson, Kaz, Kyle Menke, & Mike Bell	Joshua Pruett, Martin Olson & Scott Peterson	November 9, 2015	436	0.66
137	37	"O.W.C.A. Files"	Robert F. Hughes	Aliki Theofilopoulos, Bernie Petterson, Calvin Suggs, Eddie Pittman, John Mathot, Kim Roberson, Kaz, Kyle Menke, & Mike Bell	Joshua Pruett, Martin Olson & Scott Peterson	November 9, 2015	437	0.66
Perry and Doofenshmirtz team up with a few O.W.C.A. trainees to stop a new villain, Professor Parenthesis, from taking control of the organization and its agents. Meanwhile, the Bug Trio (from "Doof 101") desperately try to gain recognition so they can apply for O.W.C.A. Guest stars: J. K. Simmons as Napoleon, Josh Gad as Wendell, Stephen Root as Lloyd, and Paul Reubens as Professor Parenthesis Note: This episode was aired outside of a designated season, and is primarily labeled as a standalone special.
