= Phineas and Ferb the Movie: Candace Against the Universe =

2020 American animated adventure comedy made-for-television film

- Promotional poster
- Directed by: Bob Bowen
- Written by: Dan Povenmire; Jeff "Swampy" Marsh; Jon Colton Barry; Jim Bernstein; Joshua Pruett; Kate Kondell; Jeffrey M. Howard; Bob Bowen
- Based on: Phineas and Ferb by Dan Povenmire; Jeff "Swampy" Marsh
- Produced by: Brandi Young
- Starring: Ashley Tisdale; Vincent Martella; David Errigo Jr.; Jeff "Swampy" Marsh; Tyler Mann; Bobby Gaylor; Maulik Pancholy; Dan Povenmire; Alyson Stoner; Dee Bradley Baker; Ali Wong; Tiffany Haddish; Caroline Rhea; Richard O'Brien
- Edited by: Anne Harting
- Music by: Danny Jacob
- Production companies: Disney Television Animation; Surfing Giant Studios
- Distributed by: Disney+
- Release dates: August 27, 2020 (D23 Gold Member Advance Screening); August 28, 2020 (United States and Canada)
- Running time: 85 minutes
- Country: United States
- Language: English
- Budget: $5 million (estimated (Note: Based on what Dan Povenmire stated in his Candace Against the Universe did better than Mulan video.))

Phineas and Ferb the Movie: Candace Against the Universe is a 2020 American animated musical science fiction comedy made-for-television film based on the Phineas and Ferb television series created by Dan Povenmire and Jeff "Swampy" Marsh. Directed by Bob Bowen, who co-wrote it with Povenmire, Marsh, and several other writers, it is the second film based on the series and a standalone sequel to Across the 2nd Dimension (2011). Set at some point during the summer depicted in the original run of the series and before the fourth season finale, "Last Day of Summer", the film follows Phineas and Ferb as they rescue their sister Candace and Dr. Doofenshmirtz's daughter Vanessa from the planet Feebla-Oot. However, Candace becomes tempted to stay on the planet when she is treated with respect by its people, not knowing that they harbor a dark secret which involves her presence.

While developing Disney+, Disney approached Povenmire and Marsh for a new Phineas and Ferb film. Work on the film began at Disney Television Animation and continued remotely from home due to the COVID-19 pandemic. The entire Phineas and Ferb cast reprise their roles from the series and Across the 2nd Dimension, with the exception of Thomas Brodie-Sangster, the original voice of Ferb; David Errigo Jr. takes over for him. Much of the film's dialogue was recorded remotely. Danny Jacob returned to compose the score as with the series and the previous film; as with the voice acting, music was recorded remotely.

Produced by Disney Television Animation, Phineas and Ferb the Movie: Candace Against the Universe was released on Disney+ on August 28, 2020. The film received positive reviews from critics, with praise for its story, voice acting, humor, animation, character development, and music. A third Phineas and Ferb movie is currently in development.

== Plot ==
Candace's day is ruined when she fails to tell her mother Linda about Phineas and Ferb, who spend their time making crazy inventions. After a space pod appears and kidnaps her and Vanessa, Phineas and Ferb learn that it came from the planet Feebla-Oot. They recruit their friends Isabella, Baljeet, and Buford to build a portal to the planet. However, the portal redirects them to Doofenshmirtz Evil Inc., where they join forces with Doofenshmirtz, and they travel to Feebla-Oot using his spaceship, with Perry secretly following them.

While Vanessa escapes the spaceship, Candace is captured; both end up on Feebla-Oot. Candace meets leader Super Super Big Doctor, who sympathizes with her. She too has two younger brothers that she was tired of, so she decided to come to Feebla-Oot to rule it. Big Doctor informs Candace that she contains "Remarkalonium", which is important for their people, making Candace feel special. Upon arriving to Feebla-Oot, Phineas and Ferb try to patch things up with their sister by giving her a gift they made, but she rejects them.

The gang is imprisoned, which is what Big Doctor had done to her brothers; Perry rescues them. Candace learns that "Remarkalonium" is actually just carbon dioxide, which is what a spore plant named Mama needs so Big Doctor can use its mind-controlling spores on her subjects. Candace accidentally reveals that the people of Earth exhale carbon dioxide, and Big Doctor plots to conquer the planet. The gang teams up with the oppressed Cowards, the previous inhabitants, and attack the alien city. Big Doctor and her army flee to Earth. The kids follow Candace; Doofenshmirtz and Perry stay behind to find Vanessa.

The kids return to Earth to fight Big Doctor and her army. Phineas and Ferb free Candace, who they find crying over how she treated them. They reveal that her gift is a coffee mug that projects images of their past adventures. Candace realizes that she may not be special to the world, but she is special to them. Mama unleashes her spores on the populace. Candace manages to reach out to Big Doctor, who has an epiphany about her life just as Mama increases in size and devours her.

As the kids and Mama begin to fight, Doofenshmirtz, Vanessa, and Perry return, using the Chicken-Replace-Inator, a gadget that can swap something with either the closest or furthest chicken. Under Doofenshmirtz's direction, Candace uses the Inator to swap Mama with the furthest chicken, sending it back to Feebla-Oot. Mama shrinks and spits out Big Doctor before it is crushed to death by an alien elephant, and Big Doctor is captured by the Cowards. Candace has the chance to bust her brothers when Linda drives by, but instead steers her away from the scene, appreciating everything her brothers have done for her. As everyone celebrates their victory, Perry receives a call from Major Monogram congratulating him, which leaves everyone in confusion.

In a mid-credits scene, Lawrence discovers the portal still in the backyard and goes through it to Doofenshmirtz's building, which is still on fire from the spaceship's launch, and he goes back through the portal on fire, destroying the portal just before Linda arrives.

== Voice cast ==
- Ashley Tisdale as Candace Flynn, Phineas' fifteen-year-old biological sister and Ferb's stepsister.
- Vincent Martella as Phineas Flynn, Candace's biological brother, Ferb's stepbrother and Perry's owner.
- David Errigo Jr. as Ferb Fletcher, Phineas and Candace's intelligent British stepbrother and Perry's owner.
- Ali Wong as Super Super Big Doctor, an evil alien dictator who kidnapped Candace and plans to invade the Earth.
- Alyson Stoner as Isabella Garcia-Shapiro, a sweet friend of Phineas and Ferb's who is the leader of the Fireside Girls troop and has a crush on Phineas.
- Maulik Pancholy as Baljeet Tjinder, a friend of Phineas and Ferb's who migrated from India.
- Bobby Gaylor as Buford van Stomm, a friend of Phineas and Ferb's who is Baljeet's bully.
- Dan Povenmire as Dr. Heinz Doofenshmirtz, Vanessa's evil scientist father and Perry's nemesis. Povenmire also appeared as himself in the movie.
- Dee Bradley Baker as Perry the Platypus, Phineas and Ferb's pet platypus who is also a secret agent. Baker also voices the alien, Mama, Super Super Big Doctor's plant that emits mind-controlling spores.
- Wayne Brady as Stapler-Fist, Super Super Big Doctor's strongest henchman.
- Olivia Olson as Vanessa Doofenshmirtz, Dr. Doofenshmirtz's sarcastic sixteen-year-old daughter.
- Thomas Middleditch as Garnoz, an elder Coward who fled the planet when Super Super Big Doctor took over.
- Diedrich Bader as Borthos, a cowardly prisoner.
- Thomas Sanders as Throat-Lobster, one of Super Super Big Doctor's henchmen.
- Caroline Rhea as Linda Flynn-Fletcher, Phineas and Candace's biological mother and Ferb's stepmother.
- Richard O'Brien as Lawrence Fletcher, Ferb's biological father and Phineas and Candace's stepfather.
- Mitchel Musso as Jeremy Johnson, Candace's sixteen-year-old boyfriend. This was also the last time to date Musso voiced Jeremy in the Phineas and Ferb franchise as he was recast by David Errigo Jr. for the revival seasons.
- Kelly Hu as Stacy Hirano, a Japanese-American teenage girl who is Candace's best friend.
- Jeff "Swampy" Marsh as Major Francis Monogram, Perry's human superior and the head of O.W.C.A., Marsh also appears as himself in the movie.
- Tyler Mann as Carl Karl, Monogram's unpaid intern.
- Brock Powell as Braxington-ton, one of Super Super Big Doctor's guards, and Vlorkel, an alien monster who Vanessa befriends.
- Bill Farmer as Hermellivue, Super Super Big Doctor bulkiest henchman
- Bob Bowen as Toilet Flower, Super Super Big Doctor's inept henchman, and Trucker Ted, a truck driver from Milo Murphy's Law
- Sarah Hudson as Ernox, a cowardly prisoner
- John Viener as Norm the Robot, a robot that Doofenshmirtz created and becomes his assistant
- Corey Burton as a farmer
- Jennifer Hughes as the farmer's wife
- John O'Hurley as Roger Doofenshmirtz, Dr. Doofenshmirtz's brother and the Mayor of Danville
- Emo Philips as a Meeks servant
- "Weird Al" Yankovic as the shirt cannon guy
- Tiffany Haddish as the "Sound Someone Makes When They Explode from the Waist Up"
- Aaron Daniel Jacob and Laura Dickinson as alien dancers
- Danny Jacob as an unnamed pop trio (uncredited)

== Production ==
=== Development ===
While developing their new streaming service, Disney+, Disney approached Phineas and Ferb creators Dan Povenmire and Jeff "Swampy" Marsh and asked them to develop a new Phineas and Ferb film for the service, as they wanted the service to have "projects that would appeal both to kids and adults", stating that the "show has a multi-generational appeal", with 47% of their audience being adults. Although initially unsure about making a film, as they "thought [they] had done enough with these characters", the two eventually agreed to develop the film upon realizing they "kind of missed them", to which they "started thinking about a fun premise that would appeal to everyone, even those who weren't familiar with the show".

On April 11, 2019, it was announced that a new film titled The Phineas and Ferb Movie would be executive produced by Povenmire and Marsh, and be released on Disney+ within a year of its launch; according to Jim Bernstein, it is unrelated to a theatrical Phineas and Ferb film that was previously in the works. Like the series, the film is produced by Disney Television Animation, marking their first non-television film since Teacher's Pet (2004). The film also marks Disney's first non-television film to use 2D animation since Walt Disney Animation Studios' Winnie the Pooh (2011). The film's title was announced as Phineas and Ferb The Movie: Candace Against the Universe on August 23, 2019, during the 2019 D23 Expo. On March 27, 2020, Disney Television Animation was temporarily closed in response to the COVID-19 pandemic, but production on the film continued remotely. On July 1, 2020, it was revealed that Bob Bowen would direct the film. The film officially wrapped production on July 11, 2020.

=== Writing ===
During the first three weeks of writing, the writers came up with several different ideas for the film, but they were all discarded, as they had already been done in the series. They eventually came up with the idea of "a real rescue story" in which Candace is captured by aliens, and settled on that, as the series never had a rescue story, a story in which Candace was the main character, or a story that put the characters in "dire stakes". Povenmire and Marsh choose to make Candace the film's main character because they felt "it was about time" to focus on Candace. Povenmire and Marsh said that they "wanted to make sure [they] had something new to say" about the characters while working on the film, but that didn't "violate any of the characters' set-ups and rules of their world". Another story was considered for the film, but was discarded, as the creators felt it was "not a good way of introducing [the universe] to a new generation, which is what [they wanted] this movie to be", as it was "much more geared towards fans who'd seen every episode, or at least [are] super familiar with how these characters work. It sort of turned all that upside down, turned it on its head". Povenmire revealed that the writers first wrote a script before starting to storyboard the film, a process contrary to the TV series, which was written during the storyboard process.

Povenmire described creating the film's opening as "a tricky thing", as they wanted to depict "what a typical day was like for Phineas and Ferb and Candace", so audiences unfamiliar with the series could enjoy the film, "[s]o [they] showed Candace trying to bust them and never having been able to do it, how crazy she can get, and show a bust that doesn't work at the very beginning of the movie". During the film's appearance at Comic-Con@Home, Povenmire revealed that three different opening scenes for the film were created during its development, but they were all discarded, as they all depicted Candace in a negative light when the filmmakers "wanted people to be on her side".

At the same event, Marsh revealed that Bowen managed to find a "creative solution" to a story issue within the film, which he and Povenmire initially opposed, but eventually agreed to use in the film after he pitched it to them again as an animatic; Joshua Pruett later revealed that this is the idea of using a T-shirt cannon. One of the jokes in the film, featuring Phineas, Ferb, Isabella, Baljeet, and Buford going "back to their base elements" before transitioning to a live-action scene where Povenmire and Marsh are seen pitching the scene, was originally written by Jon Colton Barry for the unproduced theatrical film. The joke was re-purposed for this film due to it being Povenmire's favorite joke from the script. When they choose to re-use the gag, Povenmire and Barry spent at least two days looking for the unproduced film's draft that contained the scene in order to re-use the dialogue featured in that scene. Disney executives originally ordered the gag to be removed from the film, but Povenmire and Marsh refused, feeling that audiences would react to it positively.

=== Casting and recording ===
During the film's announcement, it was confirmed that Vincent Martella, Ashley Tisdale, Caroline Rhea, Dee Bradley Baker, Alyson Stoner, Maulik Pancholy, Bobby Gaylor, Olivia Olson, Tyler Mann, Povenmire, and Marsh would reprise their roles from the series, and that David Errigo Jr. would reprise his role as Ferb from Milo Murphy's Law, replacing original voice actor Thomas Brodie-Sangster. In May 2020, Povenmire revealed that Bowen would make a cameo as Trucker Ted, reprising his role from Milo Murphy's Law. On July 2, it was announced that Ali Wong, April Winchell, Wayne Brady, Diedrich Bader, and Thomas Middleditch joined the cast in roles created for the film. With the release of the film's trailer on August 5, it was revealed that John Viener would reprise his role as Norm from the series. On August 20, Bill Farmer and Tiffany Haddish were announced to be part of the cast, while Thomas Sanders joined the cast the following week. "Weird Al" Yankovic does not reprise his role as Milo Murphy from Milo Murphy's Law, but did voice one character. The character he appears as in the film is the Shirt Cannon Guy. Similarly, Jack McBrayer reprised his role as Irving in a deleted scene.

Due to the COVID-19 pandemic, many cast members had to record their lines from their homes. On June 14, 2020, Martella revealed that he had finished recording his lines. After recording their lines, voice actors sent their dialogue to the film's editors.

=== Animation ===
The film's animation was produced by three animation studios: Snipple Animation in the Philippines, Yearim Productions in South Korea and Synergy Animation Studios in Mainland China. Due to Disney Television Animation closing in response to the COVID-19 pandemic, Povenmire did additional animation fixing personally from his home. On May 28, 2020, Povenmire and Marsh said that the film's production wasn't hindered by the temporary closure, since animators "always spend a lot of time drawing at home. So most of them have a pretty full setup and most of them already have the technology to be able to link up". However, on August 24, 2020, they did say that they had to "keep moving things around", having to transfer in-between animation work between several overseas studios due to each studio being closed in response to the pandemic while still working on animation for the film.

== Music ==
The soundtrack album was released by Walt Disney Records the same day as the film's premiere on August 28, 2020. It features 11 original songs, the songs "Space Adventure" from Phineas and Ferb and "Chop Away at My Heart" from Milo Murphy's Law (which are briefly heard as gags in the film), and four cues from the film score composed by Danny Jacob. Two songs, "Such a Beautiful Day", written by Povenmire and Kirkpatrick and sung by Candace, and "We're Back", written by Povenmire and Marsh and sung by Phineas, Candace, and Doofenshmirtz, were released as singles.

== Release ==
Phineas and Ferb the Movie: Candace Against the Universe was released on August 28, 2020, exclusively on Disney+. A day earlier, on August 27, 2020, the film premiered exclusively to D23 Gold Members. It later made its linear premiere on Disney Channel in the United States on April 8, 2023, and on Disney XD on April 24 that same year.

== Reception ==
=== Audience viewership ===
According to ScreenEngine/ASI, Phineas and Ferb the Movie: Candace Against the Universe was the 5th-most-watched straight-to-streaming title of 2020, as of November 2020.

=== Critical response ===
On the review aggregation website Rotten Tomatoes, the film has an approval rating of 100% based on 19 reviews, with an average rating of 7.1/10. On Metacritic, the film has a weighted average score of 77 out of 100, based on six critics, indicating "generally favorable reviews".

Petrana Radulovic of Polygon praised the humor of the film, and complimented the development of Candace, writing, "Candace Against the Universe does everything Phineas and Ferb does and then some. It's a natural evolution of the show for Disney Plus, relishing in the series' perfectly timed humor, updating reference points for the fun of it, and adding an emotional layer that resonates." Jen Chaney of Vulture also gave the film a positive review, calling it a "kid- and grown-up-friendly work of cartoon comedy that's as consistently delightful and clever as the series always was". Dan Koi of Slate noted the original series' multi-generational appeal, and praised the film's focus on Candace, saying, "These zany heroes never grow up, but their new movie is perfect for an audience that has."

Jennifer Green of Common Sense Media rated the movie 4 out of 5 stars, stating, "Phineas and Ferb the Movie: Candace Against the Universe is another series adventure for all ages. There are positive messages about family, friendship, teamwork, and courage as well as valuing one's own worth. Scientific knowledge and innovation not only provide the usual doses of fun for the stepbrothers and their gang, but also save Candace and Vanessa when they're abducted by aliens. Even Dr. Doofenshmirtz is on the kids' side this time. Kids could be drawn to more Phineas and Ferb episodes and even merchandising after watching this movie." David Ehrlich of IndieWire gave the film a "B" grade, saying, "The Disney+ Phineas and Ferb movie reeks of content for content's sake, but it's still smart, funny, and full of life." Gwen Ihnat of The A.V. Club gave the film a "B" grade and reviewed it positively, despite noting some flaws, writing, "Candace Against the Universe is the high bar that Phineas and Ferb continually set for itself over the course of those hundred-plus episodes [...] That said, after a five-year absence, even an average Phineas and Ferb movie is a welcome one [...] Tisdale has been killing it with her portrayal of Candace for years, so a chance for her character to take center stage and prove that she's just as cool as Phineas and Ferb is long overdue."

=== Awards and nominations ===
Year	Award	Category	Nominee(s)	Result	Ref.
2021	Kids' Choice Awards	Favorite Animated Movie	"Phineas and Ferb the Movie: Candace Against the Universe"	Nominated	
2021	Annie Awards	Outstanding Achievement for Voice Acting in an Animated Television / Broadcast Production	Ashley Tisdale	Nominated	
2021	Daytime Emmy Award	Outstanding Writing Team for a Daytime Animated Program	Dan Povenmire, Jeff "Swampy" Marsh, Jon Colton Barry, Jim Bernstein, Joshua Pruett, Kate Kondell, Jeffrey M. Howard and Bob Bowen	Won	
2021	Daytime Emmy Award	Outstanding Original Song for a Preschool, Children's or Animated Program	"Such a Beautiful Day" (Written by Dan Povenmire and Karey Kirkpatrick)	Nominated	

== Series revival and followup film ==
On August 20, 2020, Povenmire and Marsh rumoured that they were in discussions with Disney for a potential third Phineas and Ferb film.

In January 2023, it was announced that Phineas and Ferb would be revived with 40 episodes over two seasons. The fifth season premiered in June 2025 and the sixth season in October 2026.

In January 2026, it was announced that a third film was in the works. The plot will involve Doof accidentally causing a rift in the timeline so Mom and Dad never meet and Phineas and Ferb never become stepbrothers and it is up to the duo to fix the timeline.
