= Phineas and Ferb season 5 =

Phineas and Ferb
- Season 5
- Promotional poster, featuring the main characters performing on stage. Doofenshmirtz and Perry are fighting in the background.
- Showrunners: Dan Povenmire; Jeff "Swampy" Marsh
- No. of episodes: 20 (38 segments)

Release
- Original network: Disney Channel; Disney+
- Original release: June 5, 2025 – January 16, 2026

Season chronology
- ← Previous; Season 4 Next → Season 6

The fifth season of Phineas and Ferb premiered on Disney Channel on June 5, 2025, with the first ten episodes released on Disney+ the following day, before concluding on January 16, 2026, with 20 episodes aired in total. Created by Dan Povenmire and Jeff "Swampy" Marsh, the series centers on stepbrothers Phineas Flynn and Ferb Fletcher (voiced by Vincent Martella and David Errigo Jr.), who spend their summer vacation building elaborate inventions, while their older sister, Candace (Ashley Tisdale), repeatedly attempts to expose their antics to their mother. Meanwhile, their pet platypus, Perry (Dee Bradley Baker), secretly leads a double life as a spy, regularly thwarting the schemes of the inept evil scientist Dr. Heinz Doofenshmirtz (Povenmire). Returning cast members include Caroline Rhea as Linda Flynn-Fletcher, Richard O'Brien as Lawrence Fletcher, Alyson Stoner as Isabella Garcia-Shapiro, Bobby Gaylor as Buford Van Stomm, Maulik Pancholy as Baljeet Tjinder, and Marsh as Major Monogram.

Phineas and Ferb originally ended its original run with its fourth season in 2015, with Povenmire and Marsh continuing to do other work until Povenmire signed a deal with Disney Branded Television at the start of 2023 for a fifth and sixth season. Development began in May, with voice recording commencing by September. The writers' room featured both new and returning writers, and notably saw Vanessa Doofenshmirtz's actress Olivia Olson join her father Martin as a writer. The season has received praise for its return to form, entertainment value, cast performances and characters, although some criticised its lack of reinvention.

== Premise ==
"The new season of Phineas and Ferb will follow the inventive stepbrothers as they tackle another 104 days of summer. Candace is more determined than ever to finally bust her little brothers while their pet platypus, Perry, continues to lead a double life as the suave Agent P, whose sole mission is to thwart Dr. Doofenshmirtz from taking over the Tri-State area."

— Disney

== Voice cast ==
- Vincent Martella as Phineas Flynn
- Ashley Tisdale as Candace Flynn
- David Errigo Jr. as Ferb Fletcher and Jeremy Johnson
- Caroline Rhea as Linda Flynn-Fletcher
- Richard O'Brien as Lawrence Fletcher
- Dee Bradley Baker as Perry the Platypus
- Alyson Stoner as Isabella Garcia-Shapiro
- Bobby Gaylor as Buford Van Stomm
- Maulik Pancholy as Baljeet Tjinder
- Dan Povenmire as Dr. Heinz Doofenshmirtz
- Jeff "Swampy" Marsh as Major Francis Monogram
- Tyler Alexander Mann as Carl Karl
- Seth Green as Monty Monogram
- Kelly Hu as Stacy Hirano
- Olivia Olson as Vanessa Doofenshmirtz
- Jack McBrayer as Irving Du Bois
- Kari Wahlgren as Suzy Johnson
- John Viener as Norm

Mitchel Musso, who voices Jeremy Johnson in the series run, was discharged by Disney and replaced by David Errigo Jr. to voice the character as Jeremy's appearance is reduced. Thomas Brodie-Sangster, who voiced Ferb in the series' run, is also replaced by David Errigo Jr., who previously voiced the character in Milo Murphy's Law and Phineas and Ferb the Movie: Candace Against the Universe. Guest stars include Brendan Hunt, Michael Bublé, Alan Cumming, Lake Bell, John Stamos, Leslie Jones, Anna Faris, Cristo Fernández, Megan Rapinoe, Meghan Trainor, Jonathan Banks, Rhys Darby, Ruth Negga, Diane Morgan, Zach Kornfeld, and Kwesi James.

== Episodes ==
No. overall	No. in season	Title	Directed by	Written by	Storyboarded by	Original release date	Prod. code	U.S. viewers (millions) (Note: These ratings combine the amount of viewers watching the premieres of episodes on Disney Channel and Disney XD, which simulcasts the premieres.)
138	1	"Summer Block Buster" (Part 1)	Amber Tornquist Hollinger	Scott Peterson	Bryan L. Francis & Sang Young Ha	May 26, 2025 (Note: This episode premiered as a sneak peek. It made its official premiere on June 5, 2025.)	501	0.17
138	1	"Cloudy With a Chance of Mom" (Part 2)	Chris Ybarra	Scott Peterson	Dodo Kitcharoen, Ryann Shannon & Kyle Menke	June 5, 2025	501	0.27
As summer vacation begins, Phineas, Ferb, and their friends create five elaborate attractions for the annual Start of Summer Block Party, while Candace tries to bust them. Meanwhile, Perry learns that Dr. Doofenshmirtz has resumed his evil ways and intends to use a "Vaporize-inator" to destroy anything he finds annoying. After Linda is accidentally turned into a living cloud by Doofenshmirtz's Vaporize-inator, Phineas, Ferb, Candace, and their friends race to save her before she dissipates. Meanwhile, Doofenshmirtz turns the cloud into a storm that endangers the neighborhood block party.
139	2	"Submarine Sandwich Submarine"	James Kim	Oscar Lemus & Joshua Pruett	Samir Barrett & Wendy Grieb	June 5, 2025	502	0.28
139	2	"License to Bust"	Amber Tornquist Hollinger	Kim Roberson	Deena Beck & King Pecora	June 5, 2025	502	0.28
Phineas and Ferb build a giant submarine sandwich submarine from real food and travel with their friends to the bottom of the Mariana Trench. Candace tags along, neglecting her obligation to compete in a sandcastle contest. Meanwhile, Doofenshmirtz creates a food-stealing-inator while stuck at home waiting for his oven repairman. Phineas and Ferb develop gecko-inspired climbing gear to explore Danville as Candace takes her driving test and tries to bust them. Meanwhile, Doofenshmirtz uses his "Red/Green Shift-inator" to manipulate traffic lights and rush home before his groceries spoil. Guest star: Jonathan Banks as Driving Instructor
140	3	"Dry Another Day"	Chris Ybarra	Sunny Karnan	HyeonJeong Chozon & Nadine Promes García	June 14, 2025 (Note: This episode was first released on Disney+ on June 6, 2025.)	503	0.15
140	3	"Deconstructing Doof"	James Kim	Olivia Olson & Martin Olson	Bryan L. Francis & Sang Young Ha	June 14, 2025	503	0.15
Phineas and Ferb build a giant circular ice pathway on a hot summer day, riding it on luges across Danville with their friends. Meanwhile, Doofenshmirtz uses a "Dry-Off-inator" to replace a water park's water with oil made from Doonkleberries. Candace and Doofenshmirtz unknowingly share a therapist, Dr. Mosley Shamai, who suspects a link between their experiences through Perry. After investigating and compiling evidence, Shamai attempts a public exposé to reveal his findings. Guest star: Brendan Hunt as Dr. Shamai
141	4	"Tropey McTropeface"	Amber Tornquist Hollinger	Scott Peterson	Dodo Kitcharoen & Ryann Shannon	June 14, 2025	504	0.17
141	4	"Biblio-Blast!"	Chris Ybarra	Joshua Pruett	Samir Barrett & Wendy Grieb	June 14, 2025	504	0.17
Phineas and friends create a giant zoetrope called "Tropey McTropeface", which rolls away after Doofenshmirtz's plan to tip City Hall misfires. The zoetrope goes on its own journey across the city, inadvertently captures the "Mother Mugger", while Perry stops Doofenshmirtz in time for his bath with Candace. Guest star: Michael Bublé as himself Phineas and Ferb build a massive, intricate bookcase for Lawrence after his collapses, but must defend it from an army of anthropomorphic plants created by Doofenshmirtz's "Face-Plant-inator." Meanwhile, Candace attempts to bust the boys by using psychological tactics on Linda.
142	5	"A Chip to the Vet"	James Kim	Kim Roberson	Deena Beck & King Pecora	June 21, 2025	505	0.17
142	5	"More Than an Intern"	Amber Tornquist Hollinger	Sunny Karnan	HyeonJeong Chozon & Nadine Promes García	June 21, 2025	505	0.17
Phineas and Ferb take Perry to the veterinarian for his checkup. While the boys build a pet grooming contraption, Perry tries to avoid being microchipped at all costs, with Doofenshmirtz attempting to chip Perry himself. Guest stars: Kelly Dempsey as Receptionist, Mindy Sterling as Veterinarian Carl is forced by Monogram into helping Perry deal with a late night plot from Doofenshmirtz, who keeps stumbling into his series of part-time jobs. Meanwhile, the kids have a game of rocket-powered lacrosse by sending a ball between Danville and Africa with a giant racquet.
143	6	"The Aurora Perry-Alis"	Chris Ybarra	Olivia Olson & Martin Olson	Bryan L. Francis, Derek Lee Thompson & Sang Young Ha	June 21, 2025	506	0.17
143	6	"Lord of the Firesides"	James Kim	Oscar Lemus	Dodo Kitcharoen & Ryann Shannon	June 21, 2025	506	0.17
The Flynn-Fletchers take a cruise to see the Tri-State Aurora, but when cloud cover threatens to ruin the spectacle, Phineas and Ferb use clown balloons full of helium to lift the ship above them. Meanwhile, Doofensmhirtz brings Vanessa there as his supposed "break from evil", where Vanessa reunites with Monogram's son, Monty. Isabella leads a Fireside Girls meeting to determine what cupcake flavor to bring for the Annual Fireside Cupcake Jamboree, however when they reach an impasse over whether to bring vanilla or red velvet cupcakes, and they descend into chaotic disarray. Meanwhile, Perry has to ensure that Doofenshmirtz renews his license to conduct evil business in the proper fashion, and O.W.C.A.'s business license too.
144	7	"The Candace Suit"	Chris Ybarra	Kim Roberson	Deena Beck & King Pecora	June 28, 2025	507	0.40
144	7	"Agent T (for Teen)"	Amber Tornquist Hollinger	Scott Peterson	Samir Barrett & Wendy Grieb	June 28, 2025	507	0.40
As Phineas and Ferb take Isabella for a ride on a space-faring giant pogo stick, Candace gets suits of herself made from Buford's collection of life-sized molds, aiming to disguise Linda to confuse the "mysterious force" that ruins her busting plans. Meanwhile, Doofenshmirtz's "Leftover-Revive-inator" has made his potato salad sentient and hostile, so Perry works to help him stop this. As Stacy learned of Perry's dual identity secret last summer, Perry shows her an instructional video on how to deal with the knowledge. When Perry is captured by Doofenshmirtz and Dr. Diminutive, Stacy must give chase, and break into L.O.V.E.M.U.F.F.I.N. headquarters.
145	8	"The Haberdasher"	James Kim	Joshua Pruett	HyeonJeong Chozon & Nadine Promes García	June 28, 2025	508	0.48
145	8	"Out of Character"	Amber Tornquist Hollinger	Sunny Karnan	Bryan L. Francis & Sang Young Ha	June 28, 2025	508	0.48
Phineas and Ferb leave Isabella, Baljeet, and Buford to build something cool while they are with Linda; Candace decides to try and bust them. Meanwhile, Doofenshmirtz turns himself into a hideous moth, damaging Perry's hat such that he seeks a haberdasher to fix the microchip inside to avert an O.W.C.A. security breach. Guest star: Alan Cumming as The Haberdasher Baljeet is invited to audition for the next Space Adventure film but does not know how to act so the other kids build him an immersive set. Meanwhile, Doofenshmirtz plans to zap his brother Roger with a "Deface-inator" to make his face instantly forgettable. Guest star: Lake Bell as Katherine Marshall
146	9	"Meap Me in St. Louis" (Note: This episode is a half-hour special.)	James Kim & Chris Ybarra	Jon Colton Barry	Samir Barrett, Wendy Grieb, Dodo Kitcharoen & Derek Lee Thompson	July 5, 2025	509	N/A
Meap believes that Big Mitch has been running fake tours as a front to obtain funds in search of the "Lost Treasure of Zachariah Yore" to fund his criminal empire. When his Alliance does not believe him, he goes rogue and reunites with the Flynn-Fletcher kids and their friends for assistance. While the kids create "Stabby Barf Pain", a combination of all four seasons, to lure Mitch to Earth, Candace and Meap investigate the location of the treasure, tracking it to the Gateway Arch in St. Louis, Missouri. Guest stars: John Stamos as Meap, Leslie Jones as The Alliance Commander, and David Mitchell as "Big Mitch"
147	10	"No Slumber Party"	Amber Tornquist Hollinger	Kim Roberson	Deena Beck & King Pecora	July 12, 2025	510	0.22
147	10	"The Ballad of Bubba Doof"	Chris Ybarra	Olivia Olson & Martin Olson	HyeonJeong Chozon & Nadine Promes García	July 12, 2025	510	0.22
Phineas, Ferb, and their friends have a slumber party at the same time Candace is having one with Stacy and Vanessa. Meanwhile, in a bid to one-up his neighbor who spoils all TV shows, Doofenshmirtz plans to watch the finale of the series Acquaintances and spoil it to the entire Tri-State Area with a giant megaphone. Phineas and Ferb build a "forced perspective" old west styled town in the backyard to convince Baljeet to like western movies. While Doofenshmirtz is out of town, Major Monogram and Carl get lost while on an excursion in the swamp, so Perry goes after them, with the three encountering Doofenshmirtz's cousin, Bubba.
148	11	"Attack of the Candace Suit"	James Kim	Scott Peterson	Bryan L. Francis & Sang Young Ha	July 19, 2025	511	0.14
148	11	"Book Flub"	Amber Tornquist Hollinger	Kim Roberson	Dodo Kitcharoen & Derek Lee Thompson	July 19, 2025	511	0.14
The Candace Suit brought to life by Doofenshmirtz's leftover-revive-inator returns, attempting to eat Jeremy, and later Candace herself, as the kids give chase and try to stop it. Linda suspects that Samantha Sweetwater, a friend from her book club and mother of Fireside Girl Adyson, does not actually read the books, so seeks Candace's help in order to bust her. Guest star: Anna Faris as Samantha Sweetwater
149	12	"The Bad Old Days"	Chris Ybarra	Oscar Lemus & Olivia Olson	Samir Barrett, Wendy Grieb & Deena Beck	July 26, 2025	512	0.20
149	12	"Mantis Fact!"	James Kim	Sunny Karnan	Deena Beck & King Pecora	July 26, 2025	512	0.20
Doofenshmirtz brings Vanessa to Drusselstein to take her citizenship test, being surprised and disappointed by how modernized the town has become. Meanwhile, Linda loses her wedding ring in the sink pipes, which fall deep below the house, so the kids build a massive drill to head underground looking for it. Phineas and the gang create a giant birdhouse on top of their tree in order to attract the Mockmacaw, a bird with the capability to shapeshift into anything and anyone, hoping to get a picture of it. Meanwhile, Perry discovers Doofenshmirtz's lab has been taken over by giant mantises he had made bigger after being inspired by a "Mantis Facts" book.
150	13	"The Nightmare-Inator"	Amber Tornquist Hollinger	Scott Peterson & Joshua Pruett	HyeonJeong Chozon & Nadine Promes García	August 2, 2025	513	0.13
150	13	"Doof in Retrograde"	Chris Ybarra	Joshua Pruett	Bryan L. Francis, Sang Young Ha & Deena Beck	August 2, 2025	513	0.13
Doofenshmirtz creates an inator that projects people's dreams so he doesn't have to hear them poorly described. After initially hitting both Perry and Vanessa, it begins to misfire throughout the city, hitting Buford, Baljeet, Candace, Ferb, Isabella, Linda, and finally Doofenshmirtz himself. While Phineas, Ferb, Isabella, and Buford ride floating dandelions with Baljeet observes from below, Irving appears, wanting help to create an invention to impress Phineas and Ferb, so Baljeet agrees to do so. Candace decides to go for a different approach and act "casual" to trick the "mysterious force" in her effort to bust the boys. Meanwhile, Doofenshmirtz has created and is wearing a device that makes him "the centre of his own universe", causing makeshift planets to orbit around him at an increasingly dangerous rate.
151	14	"Bend It Like Doof"	James Kim	Oscar Lemus	Dodo Kitcharoen & Derek Lee Thompson	October 18, 2025	514	0.12
151	14	"Dooflicated"	Amber Tornquist Hollinger	Olivia Olson & Martin Olson	Sofia Alexander, Wendy Grieb, Deena Beck & King Pecora	October 18, 2025	514	0.12
After an argument between Doofenshmirtz and Major Monogram on a livestream, they decide to have L.O.V.E.M.U.F.F.I.N. square off in a soccer match against O.W.C.A. Meanwhile, Buford has trouble when playing "Can You Hit That Thing with a Stick", so the others try to help his aim by creating a practice arena. Guest stars: Cristo Fernández and Megan Rapinoe as themselves It is Danville Day, and Phineas and Ferb plan to spruce up the festivities by building a city-wide carnival ride. Doofenshmirtz creates a Dooflicate-inator, to fire at his brother-turned-mayor Roger, however the beam reflects and instead hits Phineas, Ferb, and the other kids, turning them evil in front of Candace's eyes.
152	15	"Space Adventure"	Bob Bowen	Bob Bowen	Bob Bowen	October 25, 2025	515	N/A
152	15	"Droogenfest"	James Kim	Sunny Karnan	HyeonJeong Chozon, Nadine Promes García, Ram Patel & King Pecora	October 25, 2025	515	N/A
Against a sick Buford's wishes, Baljeet shows him an episode of his favorite show, Space Adventure, titled "Gauntlet of Death". The crew of the U.S.S. Minotaur - captain Dirk Mortensen, lieutenant Zarna, cadet Sophia Sharkboard, pilot Nosh, security guard Lomond, and robot DSL-4 - steal the secret plans for the Spiky Ring, a new superweapon being constructed by the Honey Badger Empire and find out their next target is Earth. The annual Tri-State Area Droogenfest, which revolves around the signature dish of droogen strudel, is being held, and the Fireside Girls are tasked with creating an authentic droogen strudel to appease Drusselsteinian emissaries, who are planning to strike a trade deal with the Tri-State Area should the dish be perfect. Doofenshmirtz's failed attempt to assist in the strudel baking causes him and Isabella to have a bitter reunion after their shared space adventure. When Doofenshmirtz's scheme succeeds, but causes the emissaries to threaten to cancel their trade deal, he must work together with Isabella and the Fireside Girls to bake another strudel.
153	16	"Doofercise"	Amber Tornquist Hollinger	Kim Roberson	Bryan L. Francis, Sang Young Ha & Ram Patel	November 1, 2025	516	0.14
153	16	"Croquet Y-8"	Chris Ybarra	Joshua Pruett	Dodo Kitcharoen & Derek Lee Thompson	November 1, 2025	516	0.14
Doofenshmirtz has created the End-All-Be-All-inator, which turns out to be so powerful, the entire building goes out. Seeing a man powering a treadmill solely by running gives him an idea: using kinetic energy generated by humans to power his inator. An infomercial Doofenshmirtz has made promises free workouts; Perry goes to the new gym, titled the Doofnasium, to investigate. Meanwhile, Phineas and Ferb have created a land boat that works by temporarily altering the molecules of asphalt on the road, changing them to liquid, to allow movement. Phineas and Ferb showcase Croquet Y-8, a giant-sized intermediary between Football X-7 and Hockey Z-9 that uses quantum portals to hit goals placed around the world. Meanwhile, Candace, wanting to take up multitasking, is working with Jeremy on a video about Perry for college credit. Perry deploys a robotic Perry as a decoy, though is warned due to it being faulty, he only has three hours to deal with Doofenshmirtz before it explodes. Doofenshmirtz, who has been wrangling sheep, has created the Go-to-Sheep-inator to help everyone in Danville go to sleep in order to take over the Tri-State Area.
154	17	"Dinner Reservations"	James Kim	Olivia Olson & Martin Olson	Sofia Alexander, Wendy Grieb, Ram Patel & King Pecora	November 8, 2025	517	0.09
154	17	"Bread Bowl Hot Tub"	Amber Tornquist Hollinger	Sunny Karnan	Deena Beck, King Pecora & Ram Patel	November 8, 2025	517	0.09
Buford asks Phineas and Ferb for help with a big ball of Christmas lights and the two use a pair of drones to put on a light show. Meanwhile, Vanessa and Monty arrange a dinner date with their fathers, who soon learn about their respective children dating each other, leading to increasingly childish arguments, and Perry stuck as the mediator. Phineas and Ferb unveil the Bread Bowl Hot Tub, an invention long-desired by Buford ever since the summer began. Finally getting his big break, Buford spends time in the hot tub, only to find himself stuck on a remote island, as a result of it being hit by Doofenshmirtz's Carb-Away-inator. Now stranded and unable to procure food, Buford's isolation makes him hallucinate the voice of the hot tub, which he names "Chowdina".
155	18	"Entrance Exam"	Chris Ybarra	Kim Roberson	HyeonJeong Chozon & Nadine Promes García	November 15, 2025	518	0.10
155	18	"Dungeons & Dating"	James Kim	Oscar Lemus	Bryan L. Francis & Sang Young Ha	November 15, 2025	518	0.10
With Doofenshmirtz away, Major Monogram has decided to conduct a routine test of Perry's lair entrances with Carl as his lab rat. Meanwhile, the gang decides to conduct an activity of trying to find the perfect mix for an Arnold Palmer. At the same time, Candace overhears Monogram, believing him to be the "Mysterious Force" and seeks his advice. A shocked Buford and Baljeet inform Phineas and Ferb that their favorite TV series, Stumbleberry Finklebat, has been cancelled due to unresolved contract negotiations. They decide to build a dungeon-crawling experience inside a dodecahedron die and write their own concluision, one that Candace reluctantly joins as she dislikes LARP. Meanwhile, Doofenshmirtz is on the lookout for love and decides to join the cast of a reality dating show titled Passion Villa.
156	19	"Elevator Irritator"	Amber Tornquist Hollinger	Scott Peterson	Dodo Kitcharoen, Derek Lee Thompson & Sang Young Ha	January 16, 2026	519	0.16
156	19	"Master of Fate"	Chris Ybarra	Shane Lincoln	Sofia Alexander & Wendy Grieb	January 16, 2026	519	0.16
Candace drives to the mall to look for new earrings for a concert with Jeremy, with Phineas and Ferb tagging along. However, thanks to Doofenshmirtz's new De-power-inator, the three end up trapped in an elevator, while Doofenshmirtz and Perry are stuck in the other. A neighbour's Engeron Collider accidentally opens up a rift in space time. The "Master of Fate", who looks just like Baljeet, has arrived to try and close the rift by pulling off a "near impossible" feat; Phineas and Ferb agree to help by creating the ultimate trickshot. Meanwhile, Perry is threatened to lose his top spot as O.W.C.A.'s Number 1 agent to Agent O, due to his poor ability of evading traps, so takes part in a training regime with Doofenshmirtz to improve.
157	20	"Vendpocalypse: The Musical"	Amber Tornquist Hollinger & James Kim	Joshua Pruett	Deena Beck, Ram Patel, King Pecora, HyeonJeong Chozon, Kyle Menke & Nadine Promes García	January 16, 2026	520	0.14
Doofenshmirtz builds sentient machines called "Coin-collect-inators", realizing too late he created sentient vending machines as his worst fear comes to pass: the vending machines rise up and enact the "Vendpocalypse", kidnapping all the citizens in the Tri-State Area. Meanwhile, Norm finds himself tempted over to the vending machines' side, feeling insecure about not being appreciated and treated as part of the family with Doofenshmirtz.

== Production ==
=== Background and development ===
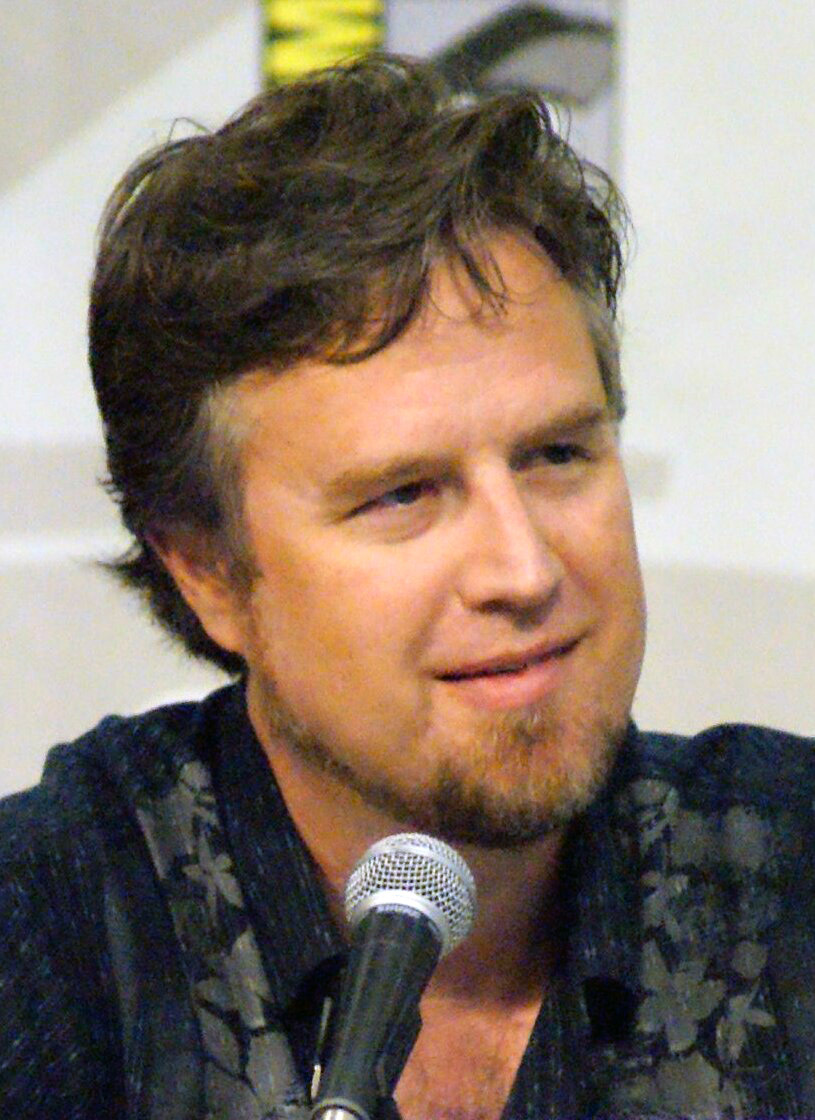
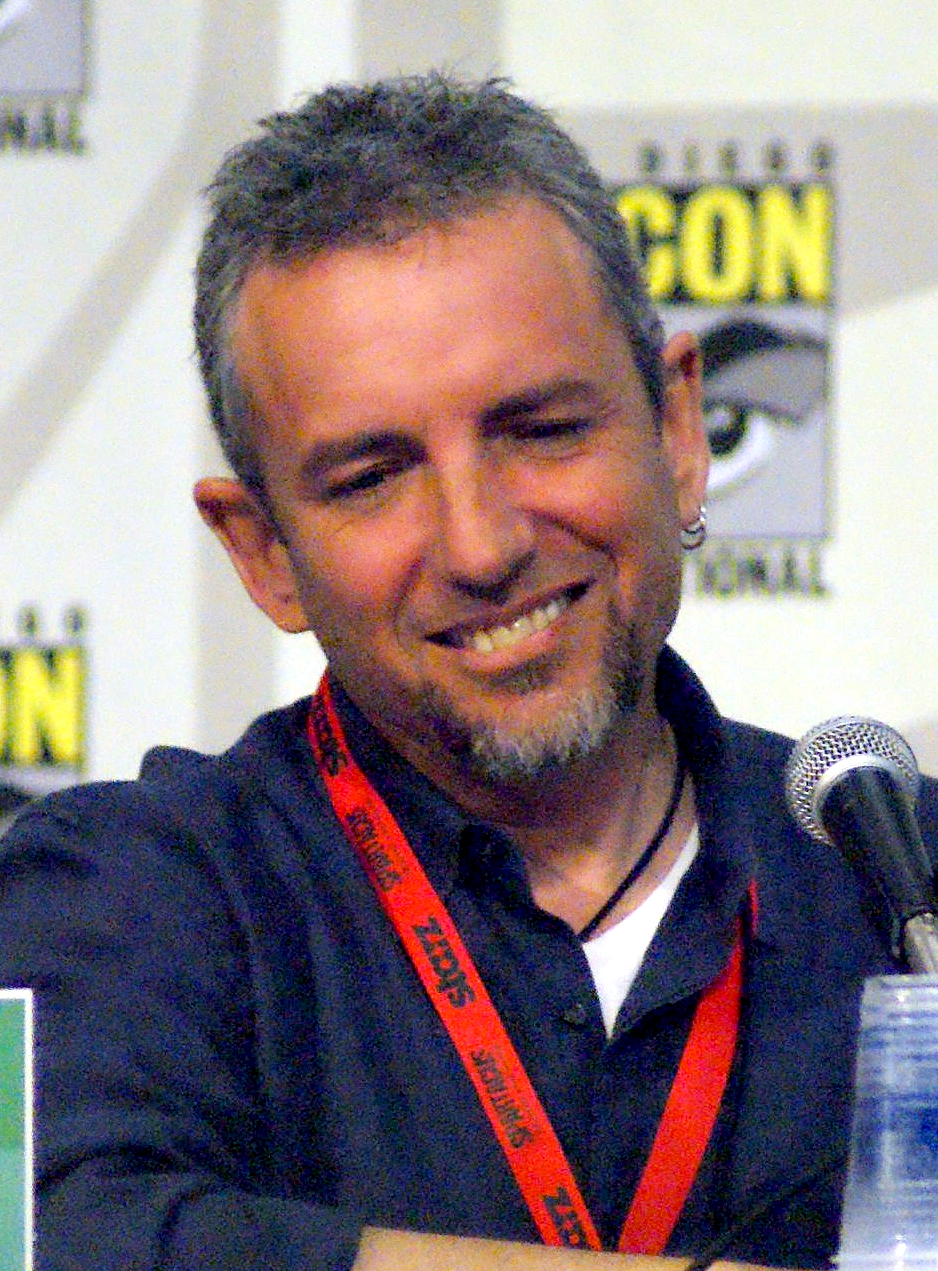
Series creators Dan Povenmire (left) and Jeff "Swampy" Marsh (right) returned for the fifth season.

Phineas and Ferb was renewed for a fourth season in August 2011. Originally set to be the final season, it concluded with an hour-long finale, "Last Day of Summer", on June 12, 2015. Povenmire and Marsh remained with the network and together created the series Milo Murphy's Law (2016–2019), after which Povenmire solely created the series Hamster & Gretel (2022–2025). In April 2019, Disney announced a one-off film, Phineas and Ferb the Movie: Candace Against the Universe, and that it would be released on its then-new streaming service Disney+; the film premiered on August 28, 2020. On January 13, 2023, it was announced that a deal between Povenmire and Disney Branded Television would renew Hamster & Gretel for a second season, and revive Phineas and Ferb for two new seasons with 20 episodes each. In March 2023, it was revealed that Marsh would also return as executive producer and voice director for the revival.

=== Writing ===
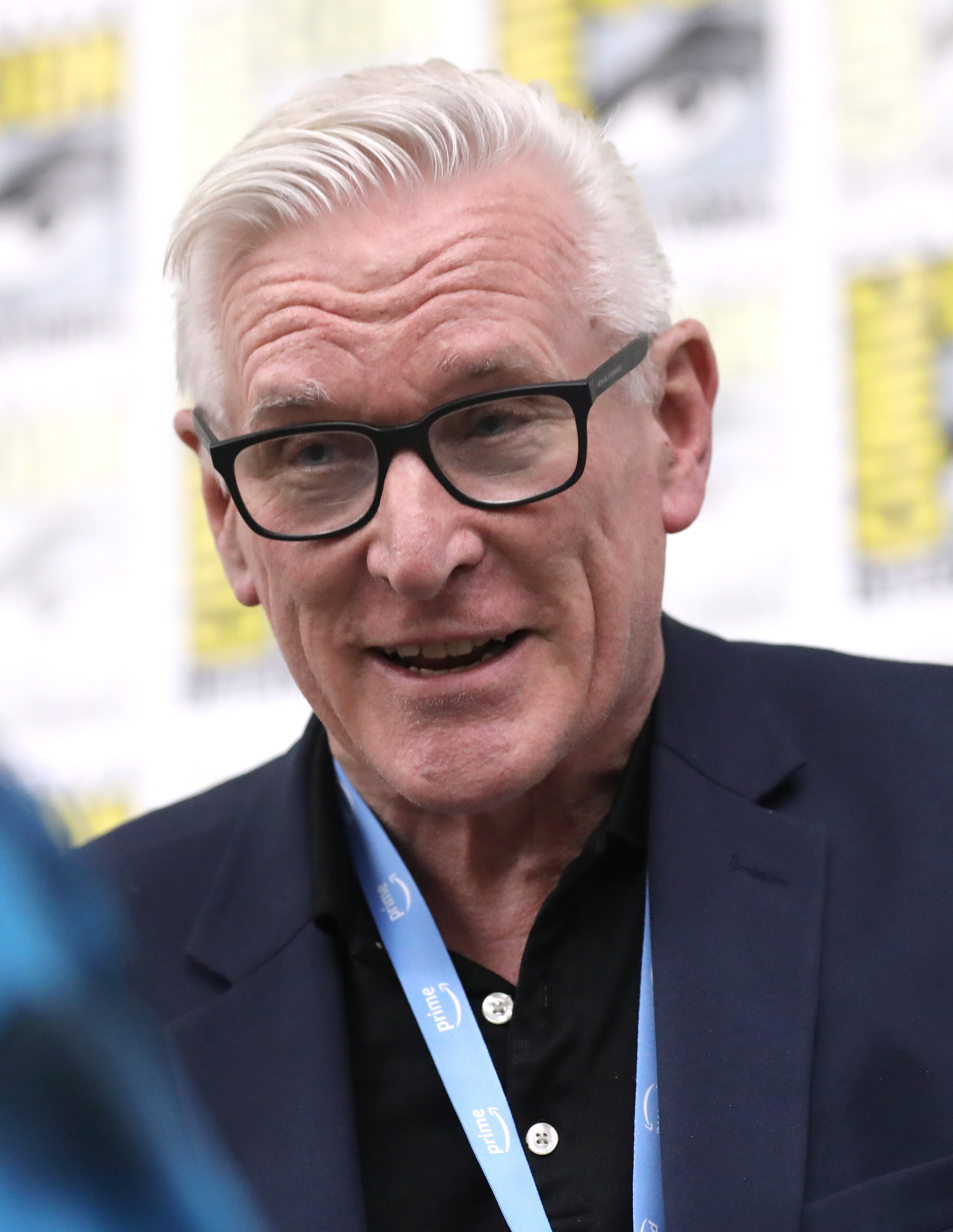
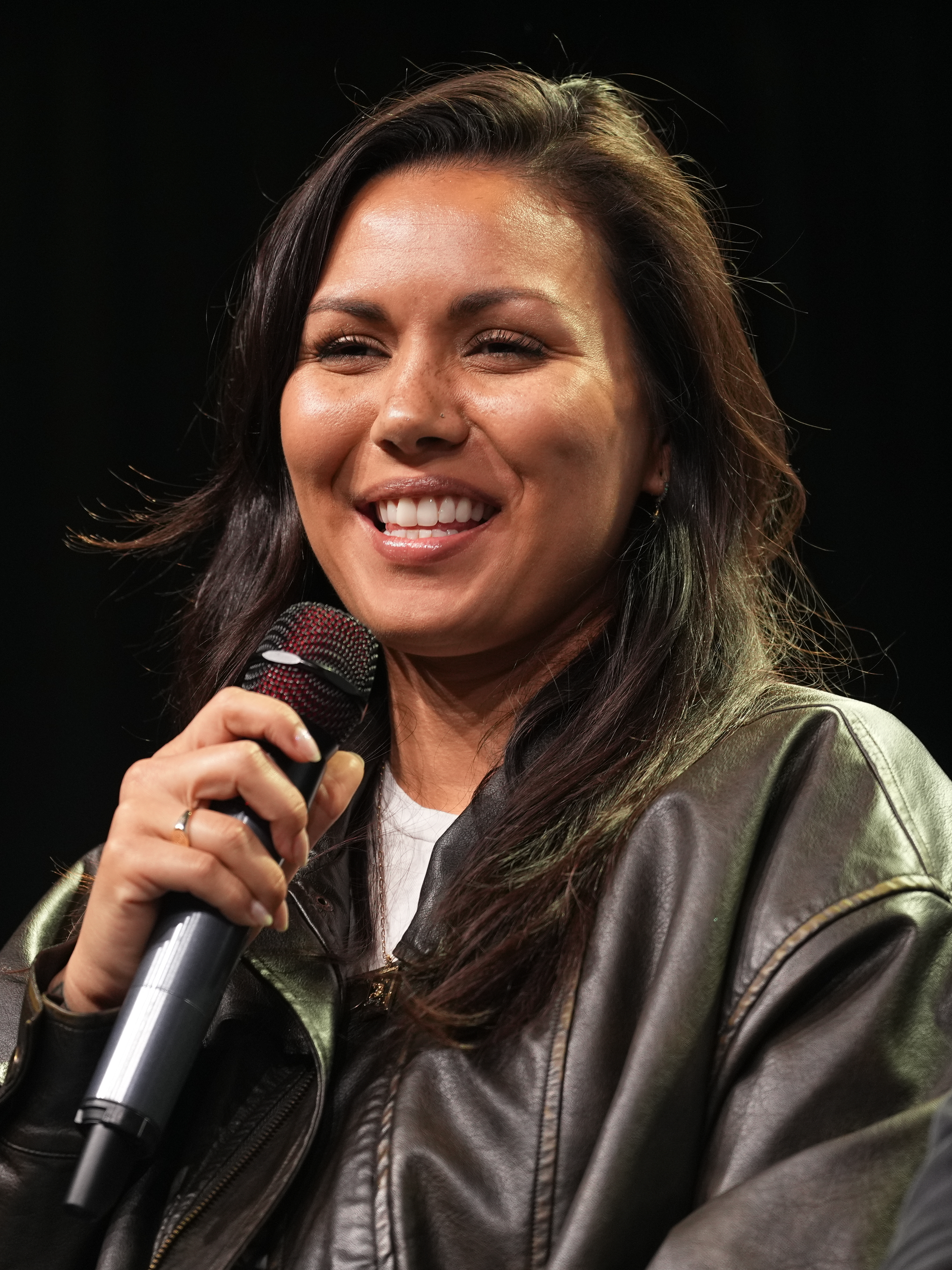
In the writers' room, returning writer Martin Olson (left) was joined by his daughter Olivia (right) as a writing team.

Development on the fifth season of Phineas and Ferb began in May 2023, at which point Povenmire confirmed the then-ongoing Writers Guild of America strike would not affect its production. Povenmire and Marsh admitted their concerns that they would have trouble coming up with new ideas for the revival, but explained those concerns were alleviated due to their confidence in the writers' room, which contained both returning and new writers. They cited seven episodes in particular as standouts which they felt would appeal most to the returning audience. Marsh said that the returning animators had the benefit of the time to conceive many ideas they had wished were done in the original run, while the new animators brought "energy" to the writers' room with their appreciation of the show's run during their childhoods. Vanessa Doofenshmirtz voice actress Olivia Olson joined the writers' room this season, after shadowing under her father Martin Olson—who wrote for the original run—as a writing team with him.

Among the biggest changes to the series was that episodes were script-driven rather than storyboard-driven, reflected in the narratives of episodes like "Deconstructing Doof" and "Lord of the Firesides". Povenmire stipulated that the storyboard artists were still given creative freedom, just that they were given more information and flexibility with the creative process. Povenmire pointed out the challenge of writing "Meap Me in St. Louis", based around the incorporated scenes in a fake movie trailer shown in a previous episode, with most shots being entirely recontextualized beyond expectation.

=== Animation ===
This season sees the debut of new art director Nadia Vurbenova, and workflow with animation is managed via the Storyboard Pro digital program used on Cintiq tablets. Having previously worked on Candace Against the Universe and Hamster & Gretel, Filipino animation studio Snipple Animation works on the season. Main poses are done by local animators while Snipple handles the inbetweening.

=== Recording ===
Voice recording began by September 2023, and was not affected by the then-ongoing 2023 SAG-AFTRA strike. Candace Flynn actress Ashley Tisdale was concurrently pregnant during voice recording and refused to record new screams, feeling it would "scare the baby"; she suggested the producers use any of her "17 years" worth of archive audio instead.

The opening credits theme has undergone slight changes for the new season; the first line was changed to "There's another 104 days of summer vacation" (for episodes 2 to 6 only), and Phineas Flynn actor Vincent Martella re-recorded his lines for consistency with how Phineas sounds temporally.

== Release ==
=== Broadcast and streaming ===
The fifth season premiered in summer 2025, with the first two episodes airing on June 5 on Disney Channel, and the first ten episodes streaming on Disney+ starting June 6 in the United States and select international markets. A sneak peek of the new season premiered on May 26, 2025. A sneak peek of the first episode was released on May 21. The season concluded on January 16, 2026, and the final ten episodes became available to stream on Disney+ the following day.

=== Promotion ===
In April 2023, a press release commemorating the 40th anniversary of Disney Channel confirmed that the revival will air on the network. The revival was originally scheduled to be released in 2024. At Disney Television Animation's presentation during the Annecy International Animation Film Festival in June 2024, Povenmire and Marsh made an appearance to promote the series and give details on the production. They specified the revival was being treated as "Phineas and Ferb season 5", and that it would take place in the following year after the events of the season 4 finale, "Last Day of Summer", during a new summer vacation. The duo also previewed a musical animatic which introduces the first episode.

== Reception ==
On Rotten Tomatoes, 100% of 9 critics gave the season a positive review. Rolling Stone's Alan Sepinwall declared his relief at the return of something as "funny, optimistic, joyous, and inventive" as Phineas and Ferb". Collider's Aidan Kelley wrote the season retained the same "vibrant animation, well-written characters, and infectious sense of humor", and remarked it did not need to differentiate itself from past seasons in order to "spread its infectious positivity"; The Seattle Times's Chase Hutchinson wrote it was "plenty silly, with knowing gags galore and plenty of ridiculous musical numbers", without losing its ability to derive enjoyment from a solid forumula. ComicsBeat's Tim Rooney wrote that Phineas and Ferb "reclaim[s] its throne as the most fun family friendly entertainment on TV".

Screen Rant's Abigail Stevens and Collider's Kelley both felt the first two episodes were only just adequate enough as a premiere, describing them as "just big enough" to serve as a return so that the series could get on with its formula, and "just a little too safe"; Rolling Stone's Sepinwall noted the series addressed the "high bar" the earlier episodes set for itself by having Doofenshmirtz admit he was "starting slow" with his -inators and the titular duo insisting they could top themselves this time around; and The Seattle Times's Hutchinson wrote that the season "settles back into comfortable comedic rhythms", while "playfully" acknowledging it has a "lot to live up to". ComicsBeat's Rooney felt the first half of the premiere was a show of confidence while the second was a bold display of emotion and drama reflective of the collective confidence of the series's staff. Collider's Kelley and Rolling Stone's Sepinwall both noted the 2015 ending of the series's story as the characters embarked to college, and agreed the series needed to be innovative to justify its existence in the time between then.

Stevens felt Doofenshmirtz's return to evil was the worst character regression, ComicsBeat's Rooney recognized the writing's self-reflexive-ness in returning the villain to his hero, Perry, while Collider's Kelley hailed him as the standout, praising what they guessed was "stellar improvisational humor" from Povenmire and opining his dynamic with Perry was the best amongst the series's dynamics. Rolling Stone's Sepinwall compared the focus on the series's supporting characters to that of the fourth season, and pointed out episodes that expanded upon previously established plot points, such as Stacy's knowledge of Perry being a secret agent and Buford having life-size molds of the main cast; ComicsBeat's Rooney praised the cast for "effortlessly" returning to their roles, singling out Martella for sounding the same in his 30s as he did during the original run.

Stevens noted the signs of Phineas, Ferb, and Candace growing up despite the "debatable" idea of the series having character development during its floating timeline. She further opined the subsequent episodes were slightly inferior in quality to the original run, nonetheless praising the inventions, and the "snappy" and "dynamic" musical numbers. Rolling Stone's Sepinwall admitted he saw nothing save one exception in the five episode sampler he watched that he felt could stand up to the original run's best, but lauded the series's ability to return after so long and still feel like itself as a "remarkable achievement". The Seattle Times's Hutchinson wrote despite it not breaking much new ground, it still was "breath of fresh air" and its message of creativity was an amiable effort towards young people. Stevens praised the lessons about family, friendship, and creativity amongst the "small bits of growth very subtly laid out" she could see the makings of.
