= Phineas and Ferb season 6 =

Phineas and Ferb
- Season 6
- Showrunners: Dan Povenmire; Jeff "Swampy" Marsh
- No. of episodes: 1 (2 segments)

Release
- Original network: Disney Channel; Disney+
- Original release: October 6, 2026 – present

Season chronology
- ← Previous; Season 5

The sixth season of Phineas and Ferb premiered on Disney Channel on October 6, 2026, with the first episode released on Disney+ the following day. Created by Dan Povenmire and Jeff "Swampy" Marsh, the series centers on stepbrothers Phineas Flynn and Ferb Fletcher (voiced by Vincent Martella and David Errigo Jr.), who spend their summer vacation building elaborate inventions, while their older sister, Candace (Ashley Tisdale), repeatedly attempts to expose their antics to their mother. Meanwhile, their pet platypus, Perry (Dee Bradley Baker), secretly leads a double life as a spy, regularly thwarting the schemes of the inept evil scientist Dr. Heinz Doofenshmirtz (Povenmire).

== Production ==
On January 13, 2023, it was announced that a deal between Povenmire and Disney Branded Television would renew the series Hamster & Gretel for a second season, and revive Phineas and Ferb for two new seasons, both consisting of 20 half-hour episodes each. In March 2023, it was revealed that Marsh would also return as executive producer and voice director for the revival. The season began with a special stand-alone Halloween episode, premiering on Disney Channel on October 6, 2026, and was released on Disney+ the following day.

== Episodes ==
No. overall	No. in season	Title	Directed by	Written by	Storyboarded by	Original release date	Prod. code	U.S. viewers (millions) (Note: These ratings combine the amount of viewers watching the premieres of episodes on Disney Channel and Disney XD, which simulcasts the premieres.)
158	1	"Night of the Living Candace Suits"	James Kim	Scott Peterson	Sang Young Ha & Nadine Promes García	October 6, 2026	607	N/A
158	1	"Terrors of the AltSpace"	Chris Ybarra	Joshua Pruett	HyeonJeong Chozon & Derek Lee Thompson	October 6, 2026	607	N/A
On Halloween, Candace puts the Candace Suit in charge of handing out candy at home so she can attend a party, but the Candace Suit makes more Suits so she can also attend. Dr. Doofenshmirtz reuses his All-You-Can-Eat-inator so he can have dinner with Vanessa, but it misfires during a fight with Perry, causing the Suits to become ravenous. Meanwhile, Phineas, Ferb, and friends use a mecha to trick-or-treat faster, but are interrupted when the rapidly-duplicating Suits form a ball and consume Jeremy. Professor Lem Enall builds a device to travel to the liminal AltSpace where inexplicably lost items go, but becomes trapped there. Baljeet acquires the device, but he and Buford are also sucked in, where they are hunted by a monster covered in objects. Phineas, Ferb, and Isabella build a vehicle to rescue them, learning that the monster was Lem Enall. Meanwhile, Dr. Doofenshmirtz tries to use his Gravestone-inator to distract people with mourning so he can take over the Tri-State Area, while Candace and Stacy try to watch a horror movie to the end to become "final girls".
159	2	"Doofenclaus and the Curse of Pirate Santa"	TBA	TBA	TBA	December 1, 2026	TBA	TBD
