= Phineas and Ferb the Movie: Across the 2nd Dimension =

2011 television film directed by Dan Povenmire and Robert F. Hughes

- Promotional poster
- Based on: Phineas and Ferb by Dan Povenmire; Jeff "Swampy" Marsh
- Written by: Jon Colton Barry; Dan Povenmire; Jeff "Swampy" Marsh
- Directed by: Dan Povenmire; Robert F. Hughes
- Starring: Vincent Martella; Thomas Sangster; Ashley Tisdale; Dee Bradley Baker; Dan Povenmire; Caroline Rhea; Jeff "Swampy" Marsh; John Viener; Alyson Stoner; Maulik Pancholy; Bobby Gaylor
- Music by: Danny Jacob
- Country of origin: United States
- Original language: English

Production
- Executive producers: Dan Povenmire; Jeff "Swampy" Marsh
- Running time: 78 minutes
- Production company: Walt Disney Television Animation

Original release
- Network: Disney Channel
- Release: August 5, 2011

Phineas and Ferb the Movie: Across the 2nd Dimension is a 2011 American animated musical science fantasy television film based on the animated TV series Phineas and Ferb. The film premiered on Disney Channel on August 5, 2011, in the United States. It was first announced by Jeff "Swampy" Marsh during a January 2010 interview with the Daily Telegraph. The events of the film take place during the third season of Phineas and Ferb. It is the first feature-length film of the Phineas and Ferb series, and the third animated Disney Channel Original Movie, following Kim Possible Movie: So the Drama and The Proud Family Movie.

The film's premiere averaged 7.6 million viewers, which makes it one of the highest-rated animated programs on cable in more than three years. It later gained over 3 million viewers to become the second most watched animated basic cable telecast ever among kids 6–11 and teens 9–14, and cable's fifth highest viewership movie ever in total viewers. A standalone sequel, Phineas and Ferb the Movie: Candace Against the Universe, was released on August 28, 2020, on Disney+, while a third film is in development.

== Plot ==
To celebrate the five-year anniversary of Perry becoming their pet, Phineas and Ferb create an enormous shuttlecock to play giant badminton. When Perry's hovercraft accidentally collides with their shuttlecock, the boys crash into Dr. Doofenshmirtz’s lab and destroy his "Other-Dimension-inator", which creates portals to parallel dimensions. Intrigued, the two help Doofenshmirtz rebuild the machine. Perry arrives to stop Doofenshmirtz, but, unwilling to reveal his secret identity to the boys, is forced to revert to pet mode and is unable to stop them from helping Doofenshmirtz.

The group travels to an alternate dimension where an evil Doofenshmirtz rules the Tri-State Area with his army of Norm-Bots. The second Perry (known as Platyborg) was converted into an evil cyborg by Doofenshmirtz-2 and programmed to serve as his second-in-command. Doofenshmirtz-2 tries to reveal Perry's secret by having Platyborg attack Perry but he stays in pet mode. Doofenshmirtz-2 then orders Platyborg to attack the boys, forcing Perry to reveal his secret identity, much to the boys' shock. Perry and the boys escape, but Phineas is furious with Perry for his long-term deception.

With the remote for their portal broken, the boys seek out their alternate selves, who have grown up without knowing about summer. Doofenshmirtz-2 decides to use the Other-Dimension-inator to invade the original Tri-State Area. In order to keep Perry off track, Doofenshmirtz-2 announces he will spare Phineas and Ferb if Perry surrenders. Perry agrees to the deal, but before he leaves, he is disowned by an angry Phineas. When Doofenshmirtz-2 learns that only the boys can fix the Other-Dimension-inator, he backs down on the deal.

Phineas and Ferb ask the alternate Isabella for help and find that she and alternate versions of Baljeet, Buford, and the Fireside Girls are part of the resistance movement, led by the alternate Candace. Baljeet-2 is able to open the portal to the original dimension, but upon learning about Perry's capture, Phineas and Ferb decide to free Perry before they can leave. In the original dimension, Candace spots the portal and jumps through, causing it to close.

The kids set off to free Perry, but are trapped by Doofenshmirtz-2 and his forces. They escape with Perry when he provides a distraction, but during the chase, Platyborg disables one of the minecarts, slowing them down. Unwilling to endanger her brothers, Candace-2 abandons Phineas, Ferb, Candace, and Perry. The boys refuse to fix the machine, but inadvertently remind Doofenshmirtz how they fixed his machine by removing the self-destruct button. After Doofenshmirtz powers up the machine, Doofenshmirtz-2 orders Phineas, Ferb, Candace, and Perry to be fed to a monster called the Goozim; when Doofenshmirtz annoys him again, Doofenshmirtz-2 orders him to be fed as well.

Before the five can be eaten, Candace-2 helps them escape and gives them the remote, allowing Phineas, Ferb, Candace, Perry, and Doofenshmirtz to travel through other dimensions until they reach their home dimension. Despite this, Candace-2 is captured by the Norm-Bots. Doofenshmirtz-2 arrives at the first dimension and releases the Norm-Bots into Danville. Perry gives Phineas and Ferb the locket off his collar, which leads them to Perry's lair. Inside, they find replicas of all their previous inventions. With the help of their friends, the children of Danville, and the O.W.C.A. agents, Phineas and Ferb use the inventions to defeat the Norm-Bots, while Candace-2 is freed by Phineas-2, Ferb-2, and Jeremy-2, and Perry defeats Platyborg. Doofenshmirtz arrives and gives Doofenshmirtz-2 a toy train that he lost when he was a kid, which was the reason for his turn to evil. With his tragic backstory resolved, Doofenshmirtz-2 self-destructs his Norm-Bots and returns to his own dimension, where he is arrested upon arrival. Platyborg, freed from his evil programming, reverts to his original self, and Phineas-2 and Ferb-2 take him home.

The kids are distraught to learn that Perry will be relocated since his cover is blown, but Carl proposes using Doofenshmirtz's Amnesia-inator to erase the kids and their friends' memories so they can keep Perry. Before they forget, Phineas and Ferb say their goodbyes to Perry, and Isabella seizes the opportunity to kiss Phineas. Perry enters his lair and uploads photos from the day onto his computer.

== Cast ==
- Vincent Martella as Phineas Flynn / Phineas-2, Candace's biological brother, Ferb's stepbrother and Perry's owner
- Thomas Brodie-Sangster as Ferb Fletcher, Phineas and Candace's intelligent British stepbrother and Perry's owner
  - Danny Jacob as the singing voice of Ferb and Ferb-2
- Dee Bradley Baker as Perry the Platypus / Perry the Platyborg, Phineas and Ferb's pet anthropomorphic platypus who is also a secret agent
  - Baker also voices Pinky the Chihuahua, Isabella's pet chihuahua, and the Goozim, a giant hairy monster
- Dan Povenmire as Dr. Heinz Doofenshmirtz / Doofenshmirtz-2, Perry's archnemesis and an evil scientist. Povenmire also voices an allergy-affected Candace-2.
- Ashley Tisdale as Candace Flynn / Candace-2, Phineas's older bratty biological sister and Ferb's stepsister
- Jeff "Swampy" Marsh as Major Monogram / Monogram-2, Perry's human superior and the head of O.W.C.A.
- Tyler Alexander Mann as Carl, Monogram's unpaid young intern.
- Mitchel Musso as Jeremy Johnson / Jeremy-2, Candace's boyfriend
- Alyson Stoner as Isabella Garcia-Shapiro / Isabella-2, a young girl who is the leader of the Fireside Girls troop and has a crush on Phineas
- Caroline Rhea as Linda Flynn-Fletcher / Linda-2, Phineas and Candace's biological mother and Ferb's stepmother
- Richard O'Brien as Lawrence Fletcher / Lawrence-2, Ferb's biological father and Phineas and Candace's stepfather
- John Viener as Norm and the Normbots, humanoid robots who were created by Doofensmhmirtz
  - Kevin Michael Richardson as the Normbots' deep voice
- Kelly Hu as Stacy Hirano, a Japanese-American teenage girl and Candace's best friend
- Maulik Pancholy as Baljeet Tijinder / Baljeet-2, a nerdy member of the gang who migrated from India
- Bobby Gaylor as Buford Van Stomm / Buford-2, A member of the gang who is Baljeet's bully
- Jack McBrayer as Irving Du Bois, a bespectacled friend of the boys who is a big fan of them
- Jaret Reddick as Danny, the lead singer and guitarist of the band, Love Händel
- Doris Roberts as Mrs. Thompson, Doofenshmirtz's senile neighbor
- Slash as himself
- Loni Love as Carl's saleswoman disguise
- Ariel Winter as Gretchen-2, one of the member of the Fireside Girls troop
- Todd Stashwick as Mr. Johnson, Jeremy's father

== Music ==
The soundtrack album for Phineas and Ferb the Movie: Across the 2nd Dimension, including eight songs heard in the film and 14 songs from the series, was released on August 4, 2011. Guns N' Roses guitarist Slash co-wrote and performed a song for the soundtrack titled "Kick It Up a Notch", while the song "I Walk Away", which is heard in the film, is not included in the soundtrack. A song cut from the film, "Mysterious Force", is included.

Walmart sells a version of the soundtrack with 10 extra songs.

== Release ==
=== Disney Channel ===
The film premiered on August 5, 2011, in Canada and Hong Kong, on August 27, 2011, in Singapore, the Philippines, and Malaysia, on September 25, 2011, in India, on September 30, 2011, in the United Kingdom, Ireland, Australia, and New Zealand, and on November 5, 2011, in South Africa. In Spain, the movie premiered on December 2, 2011, as the film already had a theatrical release in this country on August 31.

=== Disney XD ===
The film premiered on August 20, 2011, in Canada, on October 2, 2011, in India, and on October 6, 2011, in the United Kingdom and Ireland.

=== Theatrical release ===
The film premiered in Spanish theatres on August 31, 2011, making a total of €3.3 million in the box office. The film was also released theatrically in the Netherlands.

=== Home media ===
The film was released on DVD on August 23, 2011. It includes eight deleted scenes, interactive menus with easter eggs, an "Animation" music video, a "Perry-oke" sing along feature, "Dr. D's Jukebox-inator", "Prance Askance Execution", and the episode "Attack of the 50 Foot Sister" with character and creator commentary. The digital copy also bundled includes the film and 8 digital music tracks. For a limited time, a free In-Pack Platypult Kit was included with the set. Toys R Us sells a version of the DVD with a bonus disc containing the season three episodes "Ask a Foolish Question" and "Misperceived Monotreme". The film was released on Blu-ray exclusively in Japan on July 18, 2012.

A change is made to the credits of the film: the full version of "Takin' Care of Things" is heard, replacing "Kick It Up a Notch", and instead of the background being black, it features a dark blue background with several triangles. This edit was also in the television premieres of the film in some countries. The film was released in the UK on March 5, 2012, with the same bonus features, as well as the bonus episode "Attack of the 50 Foot Sister". As of November 12, 2019, the film, along with the series, has been available to stream on Disney+ in its original broadcast version instead of the edited version on DVD.

== Reception ==
=== Critical reception ===
On the review aggregator website Rotten Tomatoes, 100% of 6 critics' reviews are positive, with an average rating of 8/10.

Matt Blum of the Wired.com website claims that "this is truly an instant classic, right up there with some of the best cartoons ever made".

Los Angeles Times television critic Robert Lloyd enjoyed Phineas and Ferb: Across the 2nd Dimension as well, noting "a hint of emotional depth, regarding the love between animals and the people who live with them". Both reviewers highlighted the film's employment of adult-oriented humor that makes it equally enjoyable for viewers of all ages.

Noel Murray of The A.V. Club gave it a B+. Murray said that the action theme of the movie was a deviation of what the series does best, but that the movie still had enough to satisfy its fans, including a charming dialogue.

=== Ratings ===
Phineas and Ferb the Movie: Across the 2nd Dimension averaged 7.6 million viewers, the film soared to become TV's #1 scripted telecast of 2011 to date among Kids 6–11 (3.4 million/13.8 rating), TV's #1 movie among 'Tweens' 9–14 (2.6 million/10.8 rating) and cable's #1 movie of the year in Total Viewers.

Moreover, the film ranked as cable's #1 animated telecast in more than 3 years among Kids 6–11 and 'Tweens' 9–14 (since 2/18/08 – "Fairly OddBaby" from The Fairly OddParents), and ranks #4 among all animated cable telecasts in the 'Tween' demo.

In Australia, the movie had 122,000 viewers and in the United Kingdom, there were 533,000 viewers. In Canada, the film delivered 915,000 viewers on Family Channel.

=== Box office ===
Phineas and Ferb the Movie: Across the 2nd Dimension was released theatrically in Spain, being the third Disney Channel series to be released in theaters after Hannah Montana and Lizzie McGuire. On its opening weekend, the film grossed $1,259,632 with an average of $4,467 from 282 theaters, earning the #4 spot in the country. The film lost 49% of its gross on its second weekend, earning $646,145. The movie has grossed $5,689,121 in Spain as of December 11.

== Post-release ==
=== Television follow-up ===
A 22-minute episode titled "Tales from the Resistance: Back to the 2nd Dimension" was produced for the fourth season of the television series. It aired on November 25, 2014, on Disney XD and January 9, 2015, on Disney Channel. Olivia Olson voices Vanessa-2 in the episode, while recurring guest star Allison Janney voices Charlene-2, the 'ex-wife' of Doofenshmirtz-2.

=== Sequels ===
On April 11, 2019, it was announced that a standalone sequel titled Phineas and Ferb the Movie: Candace Against the Universe, would be released on Disney+ within a year of its launch. Most of the series' cast reprised their roles, with the exception of Thomas Sangster as Ferb, who was replaced by David Errigo Jr., who previously voiced the character in Milo Murphy's Law. It was released on August 28, 2020.

On January 15, 2026, it was announced that a third Phineas and Ferb movie had been greenlit, with the series' main cast all reprising their roles.

== See also ==
- Phineas and Ferb: Across the 2nd Dimension (video game)
