= Dr. Doofenshmirtz =

Fictional character from Phineas and Ferb

Dr. Heinz Doofenshmirtz
- Phineas and Ferb and Milo Murphy's Law character
- First appearance: "Rollercoaster" (2007, Phineas and Ferb)
- Created by: Dan Povenmire; Jeff "Swampy" Marsh
- Voiced by: Dan Povenmire

In-universe information
- Full name: Heinz Doofenshmirtz
- Aliases: Doof; Professor Time (in Milo Murphy’s Law)
- Gender: Male
- Occupation: Evil scientist
- Affiliation: Doofenshmirtz Evil Incorporated, L.O.V.E.M.U.F.F.I.N
- Family: Unnamed parents Roger Doofenshmirtz (brother)
- Spouse: Charlene Doofenshmirtz (divorced)
- Children: Vanessa Doofenshmirtz (daughter)
- Nationality: Drusselsteinian-American

Dr. Heinz Doofenshmirtz, often called "Doof" or "Dr. D" for short, is a fictional character from the American animated television series Phineas and Ferb and Milo Murphy's Law. He was created by Dan Povenmire and Jeff "Swampy" Marsh, and is voiced by Povenmire. Doofenshmirtz is a cartoonishly evil scientist intent on conquering the Tri-State Area using his inventions. Much of the humor associated with Doofenshmirtz comes from the combination of his archetypal megalomania juxtaposed with his affable personality. Doofenshmirtz speaks with a caricature of a German accent and is from the fictional European country Drusselstein.

Doofenshmirtz appears in several merchandise pieces, including a book series and a video game. After first appearing in Milo Murphy's Law in a guest role in the first-season finale, he becomes a major supporting character throughout the rest of the series, moving into the Murphy's house after his building is destroyed and before it is later rebuilt.

== Role in Phineas and Ferb ==
Doofenshmirtz in the show is a bumbling evil genius. His goal throughout most of the show is to take over the "entire tri-state area" from his brother Roger, who is the mayor.

A typical episode features Doofenshmirtz hatching a mischievous scheme or invention that he often links to a "back story" from his youth in the fictional village of Gimmelshtump, Drusselstein. Drusselstein is loosely based on countries in Western-Central Europe such as Germany, Austria, Bohemia, Hungary, Transylvania, and Switzerland, evidenced by buildings with Fachwerkhäuser architecture, the citizens speaking German in grammatical form or how the food, dresses and carnivals are similar to that of Fasching or even Oktoberfest. As a child, his parents were abusive and neglectful to him in many ways, including forcing him to be a lawn gnome, forcing him to dress as a girl, favoring his brother Roger over him, sending him to boarding school, and both failing to attend his birth. Doofenshmirtz monologues and often and displays acts of "cartoonish" physical violence towards Perry the Platypus, his nemesis. Often his inventions achieve a single successful shot before being destroyed. This shot usually serves to get rid of Phineas and Ferb's invention for that episode, preventing their sister, Candace, from "busting" them by showing their creations to their mother. According to his own life story, he was a bratwurst salesman, before being ruined by the hot dog industry; only then did he become an evil scientist.

Despite nearly failing in almost all of his schemes, there are a few times when Doofenshmirtz actually succeeds. For example, in the made-for-TV film Across the 2nd Dimension, when he built an Other-Dimension-Inator that involves traveling to alternate dimensions; this is done with help from Phineas and Ferb, much to Perry's distress. A more intelligent and successful version of Dr. Doofenshmirtz (from an alternate reality) appears as the film's main antagonist, with the regular Dr. Doofenshmirtz serving as a supporting character. In the 2014 special "Phineas and Ferb Save Summer", Doofenshmirtz builds an -inator that uses the mass of the planet Jupiter to move the Earth away from the Sun into an early autumn. Despite being beaten by Perry with a mop, Doofenshmirtz manages to succeed in moving the Earth anyway, much to Perry's dismay. It also may have allowed him to briefly take over the Tri-State Area, as the change in weather caused civil unrest and allowed Doofenshmirtz and his fellow villains to take over City Hall.

In the fourth season finale "Last Day of Summer", Doofenshmirtz built an -inator that involves building a Tri-Governor's Mansion in Danville so that he can be elected as the first Tri-Governor of the Tri-State Area. Through a series of time loops (caused by his Do-Over-Inator, which was activated by Candace), Doofenshmirtz anticipates Perry's every move and defeats him in a series of traps before proceeding with his scheme, which became a complete success. He even took the opportunity to write up a law forbidding Perry and his agents from thwarting him until his term is over, which left Perry very depressed and admitting defeat. Despite succeeding in his lifelong goal, Doofenshmirtz learns that Vanessa wants to have an internship at O.W.C.A. (“Organization Without a Cool Acronym” which fights evil in the tri-state area) and that his job as Tri-Governor is preventing her from joining the internship, leaving her depressed as well. Deciding that her happiness is more important than his evil ways, Doofenshmirtz decides to give them up, change for the better and allow Vanessa to have the internship. Following this, Doofenshmirtz also becomes a member of O.W.C.A. Despite all of this, he becomes evil again at the start of the following summer in the fifth season premiere "Summer Block Buster".

== Role in Milo Murphy's Law ==
Dr. Doofenshmirtz makes a cameo appearance in the ending cliffhanger of the first-season finale of Milo Murphy's Law, and becomes a regular character throughout the second season. In the episode "The Phineas and Ferb Effect", he and the other characters had a mission to stop the Pistachions. After all turns back to normal, the Murphy's Law causes Doofenshmirtz's building to collapse before being rebuilt later on, leaving Doofenshmirtz to become Milo's houseguest, as he is somehow no longer a member of O.W.C.A., living ever since in the shed in the Murphys' garden.

Leaving his evil days behind before later returning to them in the following summer, he often tries to be a good guy, but usually causing trouble, mainly with his Inators. After "Sick Day", when he discovers that the O.W.C.A. paid Perry to watch over him, Doofenshmirtz felt hurt, saying occasionally that he is angry with him, and losing his relationship with Perry, he searches for a new adventure buddy, bonding with Dakota in "Look at This Ship" after he too lost his partner Cavendish, and investigating his disappearance together ever since. Cavendish thinks that Lucca Farberoff is a very influential figure and admirers his work, but Dr. Doofenshmirtz doesn't agree with that view until the season ends.

== Other media ==
In January 2013, Disney launched the webseries Doof's Daily Dirt on YouTube. In it, the character comments on various Internet memes and pop culture trends, usually long after the subject is no longer of interest or relevance. Subjects have included Facebook, internet acronyms, Lolcatz, bacon-infused products, Psy's "Gangnam Style", One Direction, Carly Rae Jepsen's "Call Me Maybe", Honey Boo Boo, the Kardashians and the Mayan apocalypse. The webisode series had an original run of 13 episodes and was renewed for a second season, but ultimately ended along with the end of the original run of the main series. Disney also started a Twitter account that posts frequently in the character's voice.

The character also appeared in the fourth season finale for the reality television series Shark Tank to "pitch his latest invention".

He also made a cameo appearance in the Hamster & Gretel episode "Strawberry Fest Forever", with Dan Povenmire reprising his voice role.

Dr. Doofenshmirtz appeared as a playable character in the mobile game Disney Heroes: Battle Mode.

In April 2026, he was added to the video game Fortnite as a purchasable skin.

== Creation and design ==
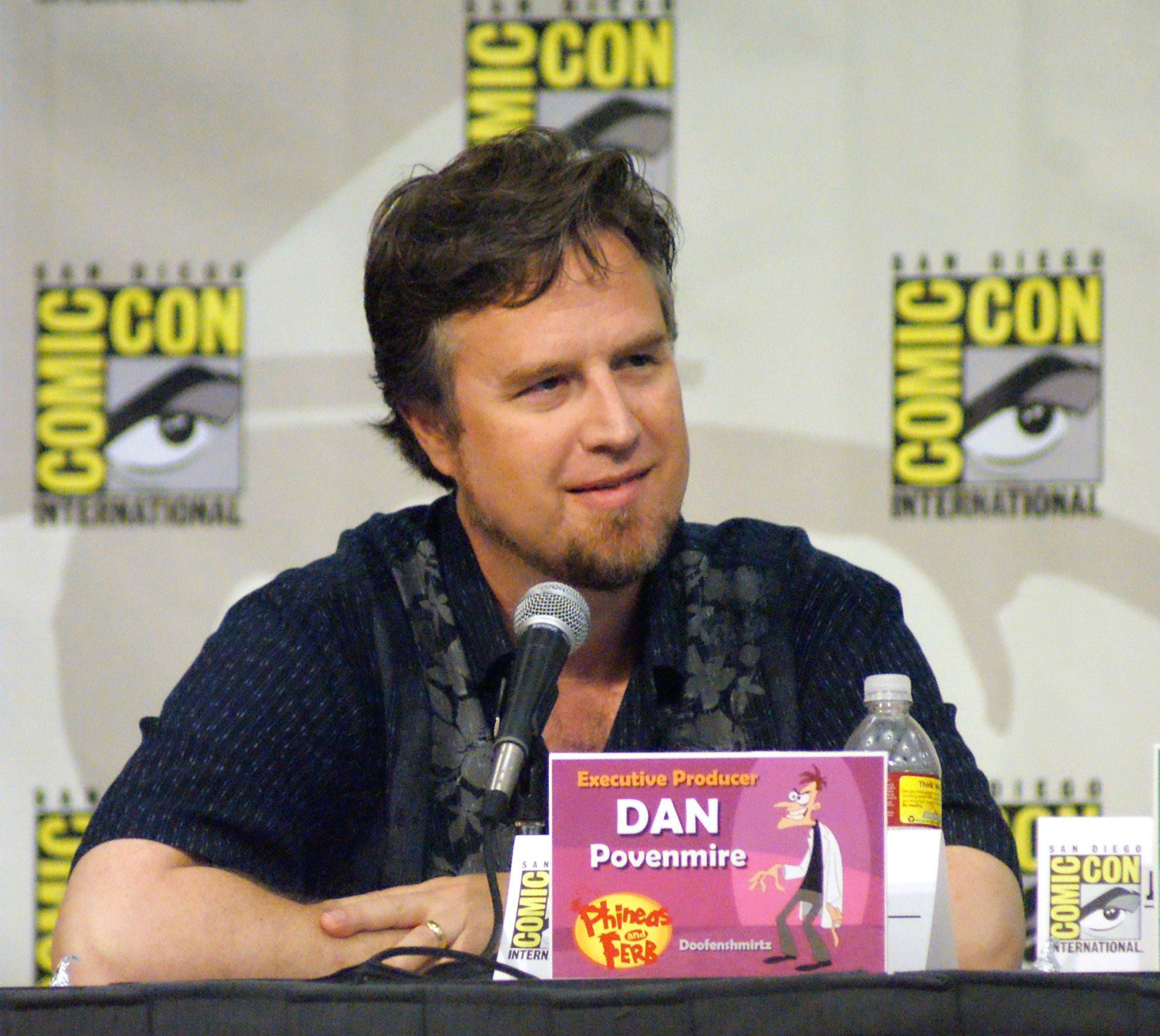
Doofenshmirtz is voiced by Phineas and Ferb co-creator Dan Povenmire.

When Jeff "Swampy" Marsh and Dan Povenmire worked on the Nickelodeon animated series Rocko's Modern Life, they always included a song/musical number and an action/chase scene. They wanted to incorporate this trait in Phineas and Ferb, and used a platypus secret agent, due to its interesting appearance and role as a continuous nemesis that viewers could become familiar with. "Dr. Meddleshmirtz", which later changed to Doofenshmirtz, was created in the same vein.

Every main character of the series was designed using the geometric shapes of Tex Avery's Looney Tunes graphic style in mind — Doofenshmirtz appears to be an oval. The simplicity of the drawings were intended to allow child viewers to copy them easily. Each one was designed to be recognizable from a distance or, as Povenmire notes as a reference to Matt Groening and The Simpsons, by silhouette.

=== Voice ===
Co-creator and executive producer Dan Povenmire voices Doofenshmirtz. He describes the voice he uses as "Eastern European" and is one he used at the age of fifteen while having pillow fights with his five-year-old sister. To this day, his sister recognizes the voice and asks him to do it frequently. During recording sessions, Povenmire is easily able to ad lib and improvise; the writers can change his lines without throwing him off. Povenmire is usually asked to perform the voice in interviews.

== Reception ==
Dr. Doofenshmirtz received positive reviews from critics. In 2009, Josh Jackson, editor-in-chief for Paste magazine, wrote in a blog that Phineas and Ferb was "the best kids show on TV" and gave Doofenshmirtz a large amount of praise. Jackson calls his inventions "awesomely designated devices of pure evil" and his complex relationship with his nemesis Perry the Platypus as "pitch-perfect."

Despite a negative review of Phineas and Ferb on Toon Zone, Maxie Zeus notes that Povenmire's performance as Doofenshmirtz is a strong point of the series. Zeus writes, "Dan Povenmire voices him with such energy, and with such perfect timing, that you'll laugh out loud even at the stuff that isn't even supposed to be funny." Zeus also says that the Doofenshmirtz subplot would have made a "fine bit of sketch writing" if trimmed down.

In 2022, Austin Allison of Collider called Doofenshmirtz "TV's most human villain", citing his attempts at being a good father to his daughter Vanessa and his "many-times-over tragic childhood" as nuances which make him a "likable 'not-so-bad' villain".
