= Perry the Platypus =

Fictional character from Phineas and Ferb

- Phineas and Ferb character
- Perry as "Agent P"
- First appearance: "Rollercoaster" (2007)
- Created by: Dan Povenmire; Jeff "Swampy" Marsh
- Voiced by: Dee Bradley Baker (vocal effects); Ashley Tisdale (switched bodies with Candace in Does This Duckbill Make Me Look Fat?); Rhys Darby (Chibiverse, speaking voice)

In-universe information
- Aliases: Agent P Bartholomew (original name in Phineas and Ferb the Movie: Across the 2nd Dimension)
- Species: Platypus
- Gender: Male
- Occupation: Espionage
- Affiliation: O.W.C.A. (Organization Without a Cool Acronym)
- Relatives: Phineas Flynn and Ferb Fletcher (owners)

Perry the Platypus, also known by his codename Agent P, is a fictional anthropomorphic bipedal platypus from the American animated series Phineas and Ferb, Milo Murphy's Law and Agent P, Under C. Perry was created by Dan Povenmire and Jeff "Swampy" Marsh. Perry is featured as the star of the B-plot for every episode of the series, alongside his nemesis Dr. Heinz Doofenshmirtz. A mostly silent character, his lone vocal characteristic (a rattling of his beak) is provided by Dee Bradley Baker.

Perry is the pet of the Flynn-Fletcher family and is perceived by his owners as mindless and domesticated. In secret, he lives a double life as a member of an all-animal espionage organization referred to as the O.W.C.A. (Organization Without a Cool Acronym). Many secret entrances to his underground lair exist all around the Flynn-Fletcher residence, such as the side of the house, most notably the tree that Phineas and Ferb sit under in the backyard, and several other everyday objects that seem to elude the family's attention, such as a potted plant and a secret elevator hidden in the lawn. He engages in daily battles with Dr. Heinz Doofenshmirtz, an evil scientist who desires to take over the tri-state area with obscure contraptions, or "-inators", that work perfectly according to his intended function but fail in his application of them every time.

Perry was made a platypus because of the animal's striking appearance and the lack of public knowledge of the animal, which allowed the writers to make things up about the species. Critical reception for the character from both professionals and fans have been considerably positive. Merchandising of the character include plush toys, t-shirts, wooden toys, onesies, glasses, and coloring books, along with appearances in literature and multiple video games. In 2026, Perry was the lead in his own short-form series spin-off Agent P, Under C, which follows Agent P as he infiltrates rival agency the Alliance of Nefarious Animals That Has an Exceptionally Memorable Acronym (A.N.A.T.H.E.M.A.).

== Role in Phineas and Ferb ==
Perry in his pet state

Perry is the docile pet platypus of the blended Flynn-Fletcher family, who adopted him because his unfocused gaze made it seem as if he were looking at both Phineas and Ferb at the same time, as shown in the 2011 movie, Phineas and Ferb the Movie: Across the 2nd Dimension. Unbeknownst to them, Perry lives a double life as a crime-fighting spy working for the "Organization Without a Cool Acronym"/The O.W.C.A, going by the codename "Agent P". He reports to his superior, Major Monogram, via telecast in his large, high-tech, underground hideout. Every day, he engages in battles with the evil scientist Dr. Heinz Doofenshmirtz, who tries using inventions to try to take over the tri-state area. Perry is always able to foil Doofenshmirtz's plans in a way that accidentally causes the destruction of whatever form of contraption his owners, Phineas Flynn and Ferb Fletcher, are building in order to make summer better. Phineas and Ferb are aware that something happens to get rid of their scheme for the day, but do not know that Perry is the cause behind it and are largely dismissive of it. Their sister, Candace, also does not know that Perry is behind the destruction and is driven to near insanity trying to figure it out.

Perry and Doofenshmirtz at first seem to loathe each other in the beginning of the series, and have been arch-nemeses since the day they met. However, they are often cordial and friendly towards one another and it is said by Doofenshmirtz that Perry is his best friend in the episode "The Chronicles of Meap", and Perry will often act to save Doofenshmirtz's life when his plot inevitably blows up in his face. Doofenshmirtz also went out of his way in one episode to become closer to Perry after he is assigned to a new villain. Habitually, their daily brawls involve Doofenshmirtz devising a scheme, which Perry goes to stop after being briefed by Major Monogram. He is trapped by Doofenshmirtz while trying to do so and is told of the doctor's scheme, usually pertaining to some backstory or pet peeve. He then escapes and the two fight, Perry coming out victorious with Doofenshmirtz yelling "Curse you, Perry the Platypus!". The two rely on this daily structure, Doofenshmirtz even specifically mentioning it in "Journey to the Center of Candace" and in episodes such as "It's About Time!" in which Doofenshmirtz temporarily replaces Perry with secret agent Peter the Panda and they become depressed about not having each other to fight. When this happens, Perry realizes he misses Doofenshmirtz too. When Perry does not arrive on the scene of Doofenshmirtz's evil plan, the doctor hesitates to execute his plans and fears for where Perry has gone, though he notes that he "hopes something terrible has happened to him." Sometimes, they decided not to fight and have fun, as shown in "Happy New Year!" and "Candace Disconnected".

In Phineas and Ferb the Movie: Across the 2nd Dimension, an alternate reality (yet more evil and ruthless) version of Perry (known as Platyborg) appears. Platyborg would later return in the episode sequel, Tales from the Resistance: Back to the 2nd Dimension. Perry's secret would be revealed to Phineas, Ferb, their friends, and Dr. Doofenshmirtz and got their memories erased in order for Phineas and Ferb to keep Perry as a pet.

In Milo Murphy's Law, Perry becomes a recurring character. Over the course of the second season, he is tasked with watching over Dr. Doofenshmirtz as he attempts (and fails) to do good around Danville. Doofenshmirtz is at first oblivious to this mission and assumes Perry is being his friend, and so pushes him away upon finding out. They eventually reconcile and Perry reveals his intentions to donate his earnings towards Doofenshmirtz's cause. He also appears in Phineas and Ferb the Movie: Candace Against the Universe.

In April 2025, a new short-form series spin-off was announced; Agent P, Under C, which follows Agent P as he infiltrates rival agency the Alliance of Nefarious Animals That Has an Exceptionally Memorable Acronym (A.N.A.T.H.E.M.A.). The short series released on January 16th, 2026.

=== In other media ===
In addition to the main television series, Perry has appeared in several pieces of Phineas and Ferb merchandise. To date, he has appeared in all Phineas and Ferb novelizations, published by Disney Press. The character has been adapted into a 20-inch plush toy, released by Disney Consumer Products. The plush has a button on its hand that allows it to emit Perry's signature chattering noise. Certain t-shirts based on the series released by both Disney and the online retail website Zazzle also display Perry and the phrase "Hey, where's Perry?" which most characters like Phineas, Isabella, Stacy, Irving, Ferb, and Lawrence utter when Perry goes to Major Monogram in his secret lair in almost every episode. There also is a T-shirt with Perry's face. Perry appears in the Nintendo DS video game based on the series, simply titled Phineas and Ferb, where a mini-game involves Perry stopping Doofenshmirtz's latest evil scheme. As of June 28, 2012, Perry appeared in the video game Where's My Perry?. On April 1, 2014, Perry is also a playable character in the video game Disney Infinity, and was added to Fortnite as a purchasable skin in 2026.

== Character ==
=== Creation and conception ===
Original storyboard artwork for Perry in the pilot episode "Rollercoaster."

While working on the animated television series Rocko's Modern Life, Phineas and Ferb creators Dan Povenmire and Jeff "Swampy" Marsh utilized several recurring elements in the episodes that they wrote. Among these were actions sequences and chase scenes. Povenmire and Marsh wanted to reuse these elements in their series and chose Perry to execute it. The pair gave him a consistent and continuous nemesis in the form of Doofenshmirtz as a means of allowing viewers to get to know him.

While choosing a species for Perry, Povenmire and Marsh wanted to keep in mind selecting one that was uncommon, an animal that kids could not "pick out at a pet store and beg [their parents] for". They chose a platypus because of the animal's obscure and striking appearance. The animal was scarcely used in American animated programs, so the pair opined that Perry "would not have to compete with preconceived notions that viewers might bring to a more conventional critter". The blank storyboard they were given allowed them to "make stuff up" since "no one knows very much about [them]".

Perry has a theme song tentatively entitled "Perry", performed by Randy Crenshaw and Laura Dickinson, and written by Povenmire and Marsh, who write the majority of songs in the series. The song, along with the number "Gitchee Gitchee Goo" from the episode "Flop Starz," was the first musical composition Povenmire and Marsh pitched to The Walt Disney Company. They were nervous doing so, because, as Povenmire explained, "Disney has a big history of music -- what if they hate it?" Their reaction, however, was considerably positive and the pair was asked to write a song for each episode, which they vehemently agreed to. The opening lyrics for the song describe Perry as a standard textbook definition of a platypus: "He's a semi-aquatic, egg-laying mammal of action!"

=== Design ===
Like the other characters of the series, Perry was structured in a simple style to allow young viewers to easily draw him. In keeping with the show's general design scheme, Perry is constructed of geometric shapes in a style reminiscent of Tex Avery's. Povenmire uses different design styles for drawing Perry depending on how he is portrayed. When Perry is portrayed as a domesticated and mindless pet, Povenmire begins with a square shaped like a loaf of bread. He then draws his front legs and feet before drawing his bill, which is set at a certain angle. Povenmire then draws his eyeballs, which are never focused and look in opposing directions in a daze. He concludes the figure by adding his hind legs, tail, hair, and finally color. When designing Perry, Povenmire stated that he chose to color Perry teal because he thought "it looked cool", though it was discovered in 2020 that platypuses coincidentally glow a very similar color when under ultraviolet light.

When portrayed as a secret agent, Povenmire starts with a similar bread loaf square design but draws it standing up vertically and places a fedora on the top of his head, which is combined with the square torso. In contrast to his mindless and wild-eyed expression as a pet, the secret agent version of Perry is detailed with eyes "full of steely blue resolve". Povenmire proceeds by drawing his arms, with bare hands that are open and prepared for fighting or any danger. His legs are bent, as well prepared for an act of danger or action needed. Povenmire finishes the design by adding his beaver tail and color.

=== Personality ===
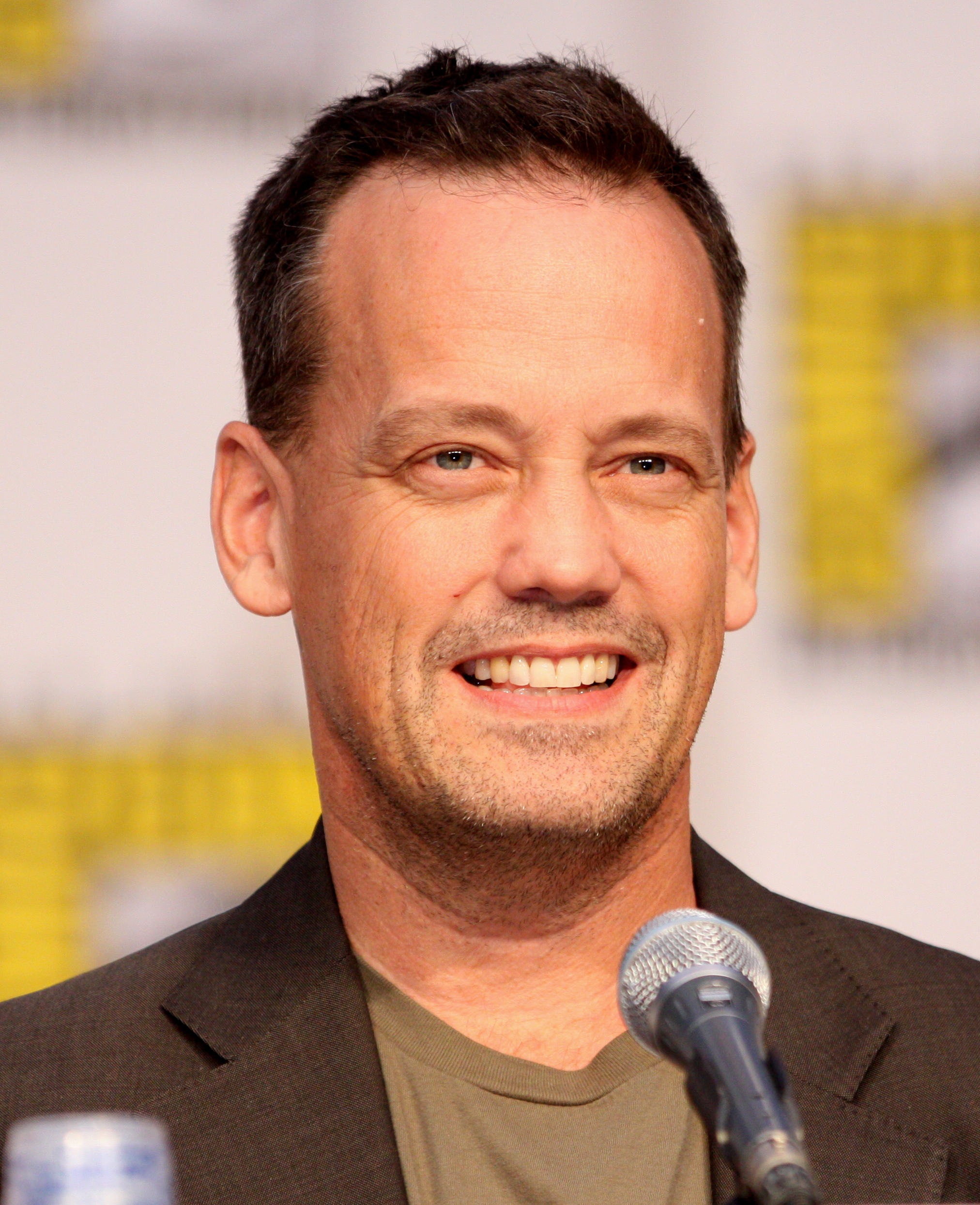
Dee Bradley Baker voices Perry.

Perry's undercover identity as a pet leads to characters throughout the series to deem him as a "mindless domestic pet" that "doesn't do much". This definition of the character led to Phineas and Ferb spearheading production of a new toyline based on Perry called "Perry the Inaction Figure," whose tagline revolved around it not doing anything but allowing the customer to make it whatever they desire it to be. In all actuality, Perry is a skilled fighter who is able to perform several implausible judo fighting moves and escapes. He has access to several different types of technology and inventions provided to him by The O.W.C.A., including a hover craft dubbed the "Platypusmobile," a jet ski, and a whistle set that allows him to summon different types of animals.

Although his appearance as a domestic pet is mostly a cover, Perry has nonetheless expressed care and devotion for the Flynn-Fletcher family. In the episode "The Ballad of Bad Beard", Perry managed to drag Candace out of the Dark Cave before it caved in because of Dr. Doofenshmirtz's "self-destruction button" which Candace had accidentally pressed while under the orange moss hallucination, thinking it was a vending machine. He did this even though he knew that Candace saw that Perry was a secret agent talking to Agent E (Eagle) and to Major Monogram in a cracked egg. Candace thought she was just hallucinating because of the orange moss she accidentally touched earlier in the episode. Also, when an invention of Doofenshmirtz's in the episode "Journey to the Center of Candace" might cause severe harm to Phineas and Ferb, Perry thoroughly beats up Doofenshmirtz and quickly handcuffs him. He then ties him to a pipe and, instead of just leaving him like he usually does in the series, calls for special forces from the O.W.C.A. to come and arrest the doctor, though they never show up. In "Oh, There You Are, Perry," Doofenshmirtz is downgraded to a low threat level and Perry is reassigned to a new nemesis. This causes him to have to leave his home with the Flynn-Fletchers, which makes him sad and he does not enjoy his new villain. Phineas and Ferb are fearful about where Perry could have gone to and put up several flyers around town for people to find him. They decide to throw a concert on the roof of a building, singing a song about how much they love Perry and want him to come home. Concurrently, Perry is reassigned to Doofenshmirtz again and returns to the brothers once more.

Though Perry is anthropomorphic, he cannot speak; only communicating through an "aggravated purr" type of noise made by flapping his bill. This noise is provided by actor Dee Bradley Baker; to this day, Povenmire and Marsh do not understand how Baker produces the noise. Thomas Sangster, who voiced Ferb, is good at making the noise and is considered second only to Baker himself. In one episode, Phineas and Ferb make an animal translating machine, and when it is Perry's turn, the machine's translation is the same thing Perry just said. When in his "Agent P" persona, Perry is almost completely silent and communicates only by body language, facial expressions, hand gestures and occasionally pantomime, on rare occasions he speaks his natural platypus language in his Agent P persona. Povenmire also revealed that he did not actually know what a platypus sounded like when choosing the noise Baker would make, and that its resemblance to an actual platypus's noises were coincidental.

== Reception ==
Cynthia Littleton of Variety magazine described Perry as the show's "breakout star", suggesting that the character's popularity is due to his "plain funny-looking" appearance. while The New York Times writer Susan Stewart called him "intrepid". Jean Yoo, a press member for Disney Channel, said that Perry is "suave" and "makes James Bond look like a rank amateur." Aaron H. Bynum of Animator Insider opined that he is "indubitably confident". Josh Jackson, editor of Paste, described Perry and Doofenshmirtz's relationship as "pitch-perfect". Zarin Rezwana of The Daily Star claimed that Perry was an "amazing mammal" and stated that everyone can be like him.

Certain reviewers have also commented negatively about Perry and his subplot, which Sherry Robinson of the St. Petersburg Times considers "pretty trippy." Kevin McDonough of Sun Coast Today described it as "complicated" and "loosely connected" to the rest of the series, writing that he is "not sure what this accomplishes except to add the noise of explosions to the already constant din of singing and screaming". Ed Liu of Toon Zone feels it is "truly puzzling what Perry the secret agent is doing in this show in the first place". Liu considers his subplot to be a type of "throw everything against the wall and see what sticks" element and writes that "many of the earlier episodes of the show don't manage to do a very good job of balancing the subplot and the main one".

Perry was nominated for a Nickelodeon Kids' Choice Award in 2014 under the category of Favorite Animated Animal Sidekick.
