= Danny Jacob =

American songwriter and musician

- Born: Los Angeles, California, U.S.
- Occupations: Songwriter; musician
- Instruments: Guitar; keyboards; vocals
- Years active: 1984–present
- Spouse: Marylata Elton
- Website: dannyjacobmusic.com

Danny Jacob is an American songwriter and musician. His credits include composing the score for the television series Phineas and Ferb, and co-producing the music for the series Sofia the First. He is a three-time Emmy-nominated composer. He also wrote the theme songs for Lilo & Stitch: The Series, The Emperor's New School, Kim Possible, Sonny with a Chance, and Jackie Chan Adventures. As a featured guitarist, Jacob has performed on Shrek, the Bette Midler HBO concert Diva Las Vegas, and on Ray Charles and Aretha Franklin's "Heaven Help Us".

== Career ==
Jacob started playing guitar at 13 years old, honing his skills in acoustic, electric, R&B, and jazz playing styles. At 16 years old he formed his own bands, performing in local bars and clubs in Los Angeles. Jacob has played and toured with recording artists: Bette Midler, George Michael, and Tower of Power, and said he has been inspired by Hans Zimmer, John Powell, and Harry Gregson-Williams. During DreamWorks' founding years, Zimmer and Jacob worked together on the soundtracks for The Road to El Dorado and Antz. This led to his work as a featured guitarist with score composers Harry Gregson-Williams and John Powell on Shrek. Jacob arranged and co-produced the musical DVD sequence "Shrek in the Swamp Karaoke Dance Party" along with Eddie Murphy's cover of "I'm a Believer" from the soundtrack album. He also composed the instrumental score for Ringling Bros. and Barnum & Bailey Circus presents Zing Zang Zoom in 2009.

He began working on various Disney TV Animation series, producing and writing theme songs for Lilo & Stitch: The Series and The Emperor's New School. Ultimately, he was brought on to revamp the theme song for Phineas and Ferb before being hired as the show's composer and song producer. He continued to work with creators Dan Povenmire and Jeff "Swampy" Marsh on their next series, Milo Murphy's Law, two Phineas and Ferb feature films (Phineas and Ferb: Across the 2nd Dimension and Phineas and Ferb: Candace Against the Universe) and various specials, and again with Povenmire on the new series Hamster & Gretel. He co-composed the score for the Amazon Kids+ series ARPO: Robot Babysitter with his son, Aaron.

== Personal life ==
He was married to Grammy-nominated film music producer Marylata Elton. They have one child: composer, musician, and filmmaker Aaron Daniel Jacob.

In 2011, Jacob and Marylata established an endowment for the Teenage Drama Workshop at California State University, Northridge. He is a native of San Fernando Valley, California.

== Discography ==
Year	Artist	Title	Notes
1984	Matthew Wilder	Bouncin' Off the Walls	guitarist
1987	Tuesday Knight	Tuesday Knight	guitarist
1988	Sheena Easton	The Lover in Me	guitarist
1989	Signal	Loud & Clear	guitarist/arranger
1990	George Michael	Listen Without Prejudice Vol. 1	guitarist
1993	Elton John	Duets	guitarist
1995	Sheena Easton	My Cherie	guitarist
1995	Carlene Carter	Little Acts of Treason	guitarist
1995	Bette Midler	Bette of Roses	guitarist
1996	George Michael	Older	guitarist
1997	Sheena Easton	Freedom	producer/arranger/guitarist
2006	various	Lilo & Stitch Hawaiian Album	composer
2009	various	Phineas and Ferb	composer/performer
2010	various	Phineas and Ferb: Summer Belongs to You	composer/performer
2010	various	Phineas and Ferb Holiday Favorites	composer
2011	various	Phineas and Ferb: Across the 1st and 2nd Dimensions	composer/performer
2011	various	Phineas and Ferb-ulous: The Ultimate Album	composer/performer
2013	various	Phineas and Ferb: Rockin' and Rollin	composer/performer
2014	various	Phineas and Ferb: Star Wars (Music From The TV Series)	composer
2014	Laura Dickinson	One For My Baby - To Frank Sinatra With Love	guitarist/arranger
2015	various	Phineas and Ferb: Last Day of Summer	composer
2020	various	Phineas and Ferb: Candace Against the Universe	composer
2022	various	Hamster & Gretel	composer

== Filmography ==
=== Film ===
Year	Title	Notes
1998	Antz	arranger: I Can See Clearly Now
2000	The Road to El Dorado	arranger: El Dorado
2000	Almost Famous	guitar coach
2001	Shrek	musician: guitars
2003	Stitch! The Movie	co-writer: "Aloha, E Komo Mai"
2006	Brother Bear 2	arranger: "Welcome to This Day"
2006	Leroy & Stitch	co-writer: "Aloha, E Komo Mai", arranger: "Aloha Oe"
2011	Phineas and Ferb the Movie: Across the 2nd Dimension	composer/singing voice of Ferb
2013	Planes	producer: Love Machine
2014	Planes: Fire & Rescue	co-writer: Runaway Romance
2020	Phineas and Ferb the Movie: Candace Against the Universe	composer

=== Television ===
Year	Title	Notes
2003-06	Lilo & Stitch: The Series	theme music composer/songwriter
2006–08	The Emperor's New School	theme music composer/songwriter
2007–15, 2025–present	Phineas and Ferb	composer/songwriter/performer/singing voice of Ferb
2008–13	Sid the Science Kid	songwriter
2009–11	Sonny with a Chance	composer
2013	Sofia the First	co-music producer
2016–19	Milo Murphy's Law	composer
2018–19	Beyblade Burst Turbo	composer
2019	The Lion Guard	singing Voice
2021, 2024	Monsters at Work	songwriter ("I'm Not Gonna Sing You a Song")
2022–24	Alice's Wonderland Bakery	song producer
2022–25	Hamster & Gretel	composer/song producer

=== Internet ===
Year	Title	Notes
2021–22	ARPO: Robot Babysitter	co-composer (with Aaron Daniel Jacob)
