= Phineas and Ferb the Movie: Candace Against the Universe (soundtrack) =

Phineas and Ferb The Movie: Candace Against the Universe (Original Soundtrack)

Soundtrack album by Cast – Phineas and Ferb
- Released: August 28, 2020
- Recorded: 2019–2020
- Genre: Soundtrack
- Length: 32:44
- Label: Walt Disney
- Producer: Danny Jacob

Cast – Phineas and Ferb chronology
| Phineas and Ferb: Last Day of Summer (2015) | Phineas and Ferb The Movie: Candace Against the Universe (2020) |

Phineas and Ferb The Movie: Candace Against the Universe (Original Soundtrack) is the soundtrack album accompanying the 2020 film Phineas and Ferb the Movie: Candace Against the Universe, released on August 28, 2020, in conjunction with the film's Disney+ release. The film is based on the Disney Channel and Disney XD animated television series Phineas and Ferb created by Dan Povenmire and Jeff "Swampy" Marsh, the second feature-length film of the Phineas and Ferb series, and a standalone sequel to Phineas and Ferb the Movie: Across the 2nd Dimension (2011). The album featured several original songs performed by the cast members, and few tracks from the original score composed by Danny Jacob.

== Background ==
During the 2019 D23 Expo, the original show creators Dan Povenmire and Jeff "Swampy" Marsh said that the film would feature nine or ten original songs performed by the cast members. The recording of the songs began during November 2019, but production interrupted due to COVID-19 pandemic, where part of the film's music had to be recorded remotely in their own houses, and the crew interacted with iTunes and FaceTime. In May 2020, Povenmire and Marsh revealed that Karey Kirkpatrick and Kate Micucci wrote new songs for the film, while on that July, Emanuel Kiriakou announced that he and Povenmire co-wrote a new song for the film. The same month, composer Danny Jacob, who scored for the original show was confirmed to be composing the film's score.

A single from the film titled "Such a Beautiful Day", written by Povenmire and Kirkpatrick, and sung by Ashley Tisdale as Candace Flynn, was released at the "Comic-Con@Home" event (the first of a virtual edition of San Diego Comic-Con held due to COVID-19 pandemic) on July 24, 2020, The song was added late in production, as the filmmakers felt that the original opening, in which Candace tried to bust Phineas and Ferb, was "too harsh" for audiences unfamiliar with the original series, making them unable to sympathize with the character. On August 14, 2020, the second single from the soundtrack, "We're Back", written by Povenmire and Marsh, and sung by Phineas, Candace, and Doofenshmirtz, was released.

The soundtrack album was released by Walt Disney Records, the same day as the film. It features 11 original songs, in addition to "Space Adventure" from the original show, "Chop Away at My Heart" from Milo Murphy's Law (which are briefly heard as gags in the film), and four score cues composed by Jacob.

== Track listing ==
| No. | Title | Writer(s) | Performer(s) | Length |
|---|---|---|---|---|
| 1. | "Such a Beautiful Day" | Dan Povenmire; Karey Kirkpatrick | Ashley Tisdale | 2:07 |
| 2. | "The Universe Is Against Me" | Povenmire | Tisdale | 2:22 |
| 3. | "Meet Our Leader" | Povenmire; Kate Micucci; Martin Olson | Aaron Daniel Jacob; Laura Dickinson | 1:10 |
| 4. | "Unsung Hero" | Povenmire; Jeff "Swampy" Marsh | Beverly Staunton | 1:09 |
| 5. | "Adulting" | Povenmire; Olson; Michael Culross Jr. | Povenmire; Alyson Stoner | 1:52 |
| 6. | "Girls Day Out" | Povenmire; Emanuel Kiriakou | Sarah Hudson | 1:08 |
| 7. | "This Is Our Battle Song" | Povenmire; Joshua Pruett; Olson; Robert F. Hughes | Cast | 1:18 |
| 8. | "Us Against the Universe" | Povenmire; Jeff "Swampy" Marsh | Tisdale; Vincent Martella; Cast | 2:36 |
| 9. | "Silhouettes" | Povenmire; Jacob | Robbie Wyckoff | 1:11 |
| 10. | "We're Back" | Povenmire; Marsh | Tisdale; Martella; Povenmire | 1:53 |
| 11. | "Space Adventure" | Povenmire; Marsh; Jacob; Olson; Bobby Gaylor | Jacob | 0:30 |
| 12. | "Chop Away at My Heart" | Andrew Novak; Povenmire; Madison Scheckel; Scott Heiner | Aaron Daniel Jacob | 2:29 |
| 13. | "Step into the Great Unknown" | Povenmire; Olson | Martella; Stoner; Maulik Pancholy; Gaylor | 2:34 |
| 14. | "Candace Against the Universe" | Jacob | Jacob | 1:33 |
| 15. | "Cowardly Story/Fall Out of Ship" | Jacob | Jacob | 2:54 |
| 16. | "Candace Rocks/Showdown" | Jacob | Jacob | 3:11 |
| 17. | "Heartstrings to Hero" | Jacob | Jacob | 2:47 |
| Total length: | | | | 32:52 |

== Reception ==
Alex Reif of Laughing Place wrote "Phineas & Ferb was always known for having really fun (and funny) music and the soundtrack to Candace Against the Universe is no exception. With most of the songs written by Dan Povenmire and Jeff “Swampy” Marsh, the stay true to the spirit of the show while giving fans something new, fresh, and catchy." Navein Darshan of Cinema Express felt that he was "pleasantly surprised by the effective usage of songs in the film" adding that "For this film that runs around 90 minutes, the soundtrack lasts almost one-third of its runtime. The hilarious lyrics and the catchy tunes keep any restlessness at bay."

== Credits and personnel ==
Credits adapted from AllMusic

- Album producer – Danny Jacob
- Mixing – Carl Dito, Danny Jacob, Gabe Moffat
- Featuring artists – Laura Dickinson, Bobby Gaylor, Sarah Hudson, Maulik Pancholy, Dan Povenmire, Vincent Martella, Alyson Stoner, Ashley Tisdale, Beverley Staunton, Robbie Wyckoff
- Writers – Michael Culross, Bobby Gaylor, Scott Heiner, Robert F. Hughes, Danny Jacob, Emanuel Kiriakou, Karey Kirkpatrick, Jeff "Swampy" Marsh, Kate Micucci, Andrew Novak, Martin Olson, Dan Povenmire, Joshua Pruett, Madison Scheckel
- Vocalists – David Errigo, Jr., Wayne Brady, Kelly Hu, Olivia Olson, Ali Wong, Mitchel Musso

== Chart performance ==
| Chart (2016) | Peak position |
|---|---|
| Canadian Albums (Billboard) | 13 |
| UK Compilation Albums (OCC) | 61 |
| UK Soundtrack Albums (OCC) | 31 |
| US Kids Albums (Billboard) | 22 |
| US Soundtrack Albums (Billboard) | 18 |
