= Come Fly with Me (1958 song) =

Song by Frank Sinatra

from the album Come Fly with Me
- Released: 1958
- Recorded: 10 October 1957
- Genre: Traditional pop
- Length: 3:19
- Label: Capitol
- Composers: Sammy Cahn, Jimmy Van Heusen
- Producers: Voyle Gilmore, Billy May

"Come Fly with Me" is a 1958 popular song composed by Jimmy Van Heusen, with lyrics by Sammy Cahn.

"Come Fly with Me" was written for Frank Sinatra, and was the title track of his 1958 album of the same name. Billy May arranged and conducted the swingin' pop setting in his first collaboration with Sinatra. The song sets the tone for the rest of the album, describing adventures in exotic locales, such as Bombay, Peru, and Acapulco Bay, as the Jet Age began.

It subsequently became part of Sinatra's concert repertoire, and would feature in numerous performances.

Sinatra performed the song on his album Duets II (1994) as a duet with Luis Miguel. To date, it is Miguel's only English-language song that he has released commercially.

== Certifications ==
Region	Certification	Certified units/sales
United Kingdom (BPI)	Silver	200,000^{‡}
^{‡} Sales+streaming figures based on certification alone.

== Recordings ==
- Frank Sinatra:
  - Come Fly with Me — (1958)
  - A Man And His Music — (1965)
  - Sinatra at the Sands — (1966)
  - Duets II — (1994) — (with Luis Miguel)
  - Sinatra & Sextet: Live in Paris — (1994)
  - With Red Norvo Quintet: Live in Australia, 1959 — (1997)
  - Nothing But the Best — (2008)

(numerous compilation albums)

- Frankie Avalon - (1963 single, title track from the 1963 feature film Come Fly with Me)
- Pinky and Perky - Summer Holiday EP — (1967)
- Shirley Horn - Close Enough for Love — (1989)
- The Four Freshmen - Voices In Standards — (1996)
- Barry Manilow - Manilow Sings Sinatra (1998)
- James Darren - This One's from the Heart — (1999)
- Robbie Williams - Hooves of Fire (non-album song, with music video) — (1999)
- Michael Bublé - Michael Bublé — (2003)
- Westlife - Allow Us to Be Frank — (2004)
- Annette Sanders with Bob Florence - You Will Be My Music — (2007)
- Kurt Elling - 1619 Broadway: The Brill Building Project — (2012)
- Gian Marco - Versiones — (2013)
- Cherry Poppin' Daddies - Please Return the Evening — (2014)
- Laura Dickinson - One For My Baby - To Frank Sinatra With Love — (2014)
- Trisha Yearwood - Let's Be Frank — (2018)
- Eliane Elias - Love Stories (2019)

== Usage in media ==
The song is featured prominently in the 1963 feature film Come Fly with Me sung by Frankie Avalon. The song was also used as the theme tune to the 1998 television series Airline, sung by Tina May, and it also appears in numerous films, including Raging Bull (1980), Dear Mr. Wonderful (1982), Betsy's Wedding (1990), Air America (1990), Vegas Vacation (1997), Little Voice (1998), Heartbreakers (2001), Catch Me If You Can (2002), Two Weeks Notice (2002), Looney Tunes: Back in Action (2003), and PanAm (2011), and in two television bio-pics about Sinatra; the 1992 mini-series Sinatra and 1997's The Rat Pack. It is also used in the 2019 film, Doctor Sleep. In 2026, former basketball player Carmelo Anthony selected the song to be used in a playlist for NBA 2K26.
