= All the Way (Frank Sinatra song) =

Single by Frank Sinatra
- B-side: "Chicago"
- Released: September 1957
- Recorded: August 13, 1957
- Studio: Capitol, Hollywood, California
- Genre: Pop
- Length: 2:50
- Label: Capitol
- Composer: Jimmy Van Heusen
- Lyricist: Sammy Cahn

Frank Sinatra singles chronology
| "Something Wonderful Happens in Summer" (1957) | "All the Way" (1957) | "Mistletoe and Holly" (1957) |

"All the Way" is a song published in 1957 by Maraville Music Corporation. The music was written by Jimmy Van Heusen with lyrics by Sammy Cahn.

== Frank Sinatra recording ==
In 1957, a recording of "All the Way" was made famous by Frank Sinatra. It was introduced in the film The Joker Is Wild. Sinatra's recording is the best-selling version of the song. Aside from this song, he also sang "Chicago (That Toddlin' Town)" for the film. It wound up as the flipside of "All the Way" when Capitol Records released the song as a single. The single reached No. 15 in sales and No. 2 in airplay on the Billboard charts. The song peaked at No. 3 on the UK Singles Chart. The song in its orchestral arrangement by Nelson Riddle received the 1957 Academy Award for Best Original Song. Sinatra rerecorded the song, with a Nelson Riddle arrangement, for his 1963 album Sinatra's Sinatra.

== Translations ==
Mina performed "Si, amor", the Italian version of the song, in Canzonissima, a 1968 RAI musical variety series. Neil Sedaka also recorded "Si, amor" in the mid-1960s.

Tito Rodríguez performed "Dime Que Me Quieres", a Spanish version of this song, in his 25th Anniversary Performance with the Lucho Macedo orchestra.

Juan Carlos Coronel recorded "Hasta El Fin", a Spanish version of this song, as part of his Lenguaje Universal album released in 2017, arranged by Jorge Calandrelli.

== Cover versions ==
After the Frank Sinatra recording, "All the Way" has been covered since by many musicians, including:

- Bing Crosby - recorded the song for his radio show in 1957 and it was subsequently released on CD.
- Pianist Herbie Nichols played an instrumental version of the song on the album Love, Gloom, Cash, Love, which was recorded in November 1957.
- Keely Smith - 1958 album Politely!
- Trumpeter Lee Morgan played an instrumental version of the song on the album Candy, which was released November 1958.
- Billie Holiday recorded a version of the song in March 1959, four months before her death, which is available on the album Last Recording.
- Etta Jones - 1960 album Don't Go to Strangers.
- King Curtis and Nat Adderley recorded a version for Curtis's 1960 album, Soul Meeting.
- Brenda Lee - 1961 album All the Way.
- Neil Sedaka recorded the song for his big band album Circulate in 1961. This song has since appeared on other compilation albums of his.
- Sam Cooke - 1963 album Mr. Soul.
- Marty Robbins - 1962 album Marty After Midnight.
- Canadian band leader Robert Farnon included an instrumental version on his 1965 album Robert Farnon and His Orchestra Play the Hits of Sinatra.
- A cover by James Brown & the Dee Felice Trio was released on their album Gettin' Down to It, in 1969.
- Glen Campbell recorded the song for his album Try a Little Kindness in 1970.
- New Birth recorded the song for their 1970 eponymous debut album as well as their Coming Together album in 1972.
- Lou Rawls released a version of the song on his 1977 album Unmistakably Lou.
- A cover by Ray Price peaked at number 73 on the Billboard Hot Country Singles chart in 1986.
- This song was covered by punk rocker Richard Hell & the Voidoids as a track on their first album Blank Generation in 1977, but was not released until the album was re-issued in 1990.
- Jeffrey Osborne recorded a version of "All the Way" which was featured in the 1991 motion picture (and soundtrack) Dying Young, starring Julia Roberts. The soundtrack from Dying Young was composed and produced by James Newton Howard.
- Jimmy Scott recorded the song in his distinctive singing style on his album All the Way in 1992.
- Iva Davies and his band Icehouse recorded it as part of the 1995 release of The Berlin Tapes.
- Nicholas Lyndhurst, as time traveller Gary Sparrow, sang it on a 1995 episode of the BBC sitcom Goodnight Sweetheart, claiming that he had written the song himself.
- Jazz saxophonist Joe Lovano included the song in his 1996 album Celebrating Sinatra.
- James Darren, playing a hologram of a Vegas lounge singer, sang it on the Star Trek: Deep Space Nine 1998 episode titled "Image in the Sand".
- Céline Dion performed "All The Way" in 1998-1999 as the final part of an acoustic medley during her Let's Talk About Love World Tour. She also recorded "All the Way" as a virtual duet with Sinatra (using the vocals from his 1963 Reprise recording) on her 1999 compilation album All the Way... A Decade of Song and also performed the virtual duet version in her Las Vegas show, A New Day.... This version of the song was nominated for a Grammy Award for Best Collaboration. She sang the song at the "Sinatra 100 — An All-Star GRAMMY Concert" in Las Vegas on December 6, 2015.
- James Darren recorded the song in 1999 for his album This One's From The Heart
- Bobby Darin recorded the song in the 1960s, but it was not released until the 2004 album Aces Back to Back.
- The Italian singer Mina covered the song (in English) on the album-tribute to Frank Sinatra, L'allieva, in 2005.
- Harry Connick, Jr. recorded the song for his 2009 album Your Songs.
- Laura Dickinson recorded the song for her debut album One For My Baby - To Frank Sinatra With Love, which released on December 12, 2014, in celebration of Sinatra's 99th birthday.
- Bob Dylan recorded the song as a country waltz for his 2016 album Fallen Angels.
- Katharine McPhee recorded the song in 2017 for her album I Fall In Love Too Easily
- Trisha Yearwood covered the song as part of her 2018 Frank Sinatra tribute album Let's Be Frank
