= Cinderella III: A Twist in Time (soundtrack) =

Soundtrack album by Walt Disney Records
- Released: March 2, 2007
- Length: 16:55
- Label: Walt Disney Records

Singles from Cinderella III: A Twist in Time
- 1. "I Still Believe" Released: March 2, 2007

Cinderella III: A Twist in Time is the soundtrack to the 2007 animated musical fantasy film of the same name released through Walt Disney Records on March 2, 2007. The album accompanied seven songs written by Michael Weiner and Alan Zachary, and performed by the cast members, along with two songs performed by Hayden Panettiere and Laura Dickinson. It also includes a theme song composed by Joel McNeely who underscored the film.

== Background ==
Michael Weiner and Alan Zachary wrote original songs for A Twist in Time, having previously written the book, music and lyrics for Twice Charmed. Composer Joel McNeely, who had worked on several Disney direct-to-video sequels, underscored the incidental music. Cast as Cinderella's singing voice, Broadway performer Tami Tappan recorded several songs for the film. Actress Hayden Panettiere recorded the film's theme song, "I Still Believe", one of her earliest attempts to establish a music career. Panettiere's music video was heavily rotated on Disney Channel at the time and was included as a bonus feature on the film's DVD. A soundtrack released March 2, 2007, and featuring a cover by singer Laura Dickinson, is available for digital download on Apple Music.

== Reception ==
Film critic and historian Joe Leydon considered the soundtrack having "pleasant (albeit forgettable) original tunes". BBC Online wrote "All the songs are good, but you can't beat the talking-singing-all-entertaining mice's numbers". John Lasser of Blogcritics wrote "In true Disney fashion this movie is a musical, but the vast majority of the songs are uninspired, and definitely the weak spot in the production. They tend to be overly sappy, and seem to exist solely so that the film can be a musical, and not as an intrinsic part of the movie itself. The one bright spot in the songs is the number sung by Jaq and Gus, it is funny, charming, and just over the top enough to be a good time." Ed Perkis of CinemaBlend called the songs "mediocre" but comparatively better to other direct-to-video Disney sequels.

== Track listing ==
No.	Title	Artist(s)	Length
1.	"Perfectly Perfect"	Rob Paulsen; Corey Burton; Russi Taylor; Tami Tappan; Lesli Margherita; Tress MacNeille	4:03
2.	"More Than a Dream"	Tappan	2:09
3.	"At the Ball"	Paulsen; Burton	1:31
4.	"At the Ball" (Reprise)	Paulsen; Burton	0:18
5.	"I Still Believe"	Hayden Panettiere	3:27
6.	"More Than a Dream" (Pop version)	Laura Dickinson	2:45
7.	"A Love for All Time" (Love theme from Cinderella III: A Twist in Time)	Joel McNeely	2:42
Total length:			16:55

== Personnel ==
Credits adapted from liner notes:

- Original music and lyrics: Michael Weiner, Alan Zachary
- Original score composed and produced by: Joel McNeely
- Musical arrangements: Alan Silva
- Chorus: Jennifer Barnes, Cindy Bourquin, Amick Byram, Tim Davis, Scottie Haskell, Teri Koide, Susie Stevens-Logan, Bobbi Page
- Music supervisor: Steven Gizicki
- Supervising music editor: Dominick Certo
- Recording and mixing: Rich Breen
- Orchestration: Joel McNeely, David Slonaker, Don Nemitz and Conrad Pope
- Score recorded at: The Newman Scoring Stage, Twentieth Century Fox Studios
- Vocal recording: Cary Butler, Gabriel Mann
- Music contractors: Sandy DeCrescent, Isobel Griffiths
- Vocal contractor: Bobbi Page
- Music production coordinator: A.J. Lara
- Administrator of music production: Jason Henkel
- Supervising copyist: Booker White

== Charts ==
Chart performance for Cinderella III: A Twist in Time
Chart (2007)	Peak position
US Soundtrack Albums (Billboard)	18
