= Roxi Drive =

British singer-songwriter and actress

- Occupations: Singer-songwriter, actress
- Years active: 2017–present
- Musical career
- Origin: London, United Kingdom
- Genre: Synthwave
- Label: Roxi Record Corp
- Website: roxidrive.bandcamp.com

Roxi Drive is a British singer-songwriter and actress. In 2017, she began writing and recording 1980s-influenced synth-pop, synth-rock and synthwave songs, having always had a passion for 1980s music. Her first song, "Run All Night (Chase This Dream)", was released in June 2017 as a collaboration with producer Sellorekt/LA Dreams. Later that year, she released her first extended play, Girl on the TV. She worked with several producers for her first studio album, Strangers of the Night, which was released in October 2018. She released several more singles, including "Dangerous" with Juno Dreams and "Polybius (Arcade Killer)", and her second album, Electric Heart, was released in October 2020. Her music has been received positively, with praise towards her songwriting and production.

== Career ==
As a child, Roxi Drive regularly performed in school choirs, plays, and theatre groups. She often watched Top of the Pops and was "entranced" by artists like Tiffany, Madonna, and the Pet Shop Boys. When she was 10, she asked her teacher if she could perform "Eternal Flame" by the Bangles in front of the class. Her original background is acting, though she felt a lack of enthusiasm for the roles for which she auditioned, preferring writing and recording music. She was involved in musical theatre, having always enjoyed singing. She was part of a 1940s-style harmony group, The Morellas, which toured around the United Kingdom. As a fan of 1980s music, she finds her synthwave music more fulfilling to create. Some of her influences include Kim Wilde, Tuesday Knight, Cyndi Lauper, and Tears for Fears. She specifically cited the colour and fashion as some of the highlights of the 1980s.

Sellorekt/LA Dreams reworked his song "Run All Night" with vocals by Roxi Drive; they originally used full verse–chorus form and more lyrics, but cut it down with a main chorus. It was released as "Run All Night (Chase This Dream) in 2017. Roxi Drive released an extended play (EP), Girl on the TV in 2017. Roxi Drive worked with several producers for her first full album, Strangers of the Night, including TAKTA, with whom she had worked on her EP; they both wanted to work on an Italo disco song, which led to "Walking Out of Love". Roxi Drive wanted the album to tell a story, akin to a film, with different emotions and genres; she "wanted it to be fun and nostalgic" and display the "roller coaster of emotions" of humans. The album was received positively; Michael Marotta of Vanyaland praised the writing and timing of the tracks, and Vehlinggo's Andrew B. White lauded the production and arrangement.

The song "Night Waves" was recorded to promote the horror novel of the same name by David Irons. "Dangerous", released as a single in May 2019, was produced by Juno Dreams; the track was almost complete when Roxi Drive joined it, and she provided lyrics and vocals. Her lyrics were inspired by Fright Night (1985), one of her favourite horror films. She later considered "Dangerous" to be her favourite of her songs. "Breathe You", released as a single in January 2020, was inspired by the film Starman (1984); the song is based around an extra-terrestrial being who struggles to return home as he has fallen in love. "Breathe You" was named among the best synth songs of March 2020 by Magnetic Magazine's Chris Rohn.

Roxi Drive worked with several producers for her second album, Electric Heart. She wanted to achieve an authentic style with the songs, exploring more pop rock tracks with electric guitars. Some of her favourite songs from the album include: "All My Dreams", as she felt that her voice synergised well with Kidburn, who wrote the track; "Breakdown" and "Video Fantasy", which she described as "real food stomping feel good tunes"; and "Electricity", as it is enjoyable to perform on stage. For the cover of Electric Heart, Roxi Drive was inspired by covers from the 1980s, including Pat Benatar and Laura Brannigan. Her friend and band member Glen Jevon took the photographs at her house in an afternoon. The album was received positively; Forever Synth praised "the passion and immense work that went into this alluring album", and Raymond Garcia of Synth Zone scored the album 8/10, calling Roxi Drive "soulfully beautiful inside and out".

In 2020, Roxi Drive wrote the song "Polybius (Arcade Killer)", which was her first collaboration with Glen Jevon as producer, to promote Irons's horror novel Polybius. She released a music video for the song "Video Fantasy" in 2020, for which she enlisted the help of a community of 1980s music fans on Instagram; due to the COVID-19 pandemic, they filmed themselves dancing in their homes dressed in 1980s-inspired outfits and hairstyles. In July 2020, Roxi Drive was featured on the compilation album Hot Summer Synth Vol. 1, by Future 80's Records. She released a single, "1985", in October 2020. The song is a collaboration with Sellorekt/LA Dreams and saxophonist Josh Wakeham. In the future, Roxi Drive intends to release a VHS tape consisting of her music videos, with interviews in between.

In February 2022, Roxi Drive and Jevon collaborated on the single "Make Me Scream", with Roxi Drive writing and Jevon composing and producing. This was followed by "Don't Mess With My Heart" in September, and "Obsession" in July 2023; the latter is the lead single of Roxi Drive's forthcoming album, tentatively titled Obsession.

== Discography ==
=== Albums and EPs ===
Title	Release date	Label
Girl on the TV (EP)	9 November 2017	Roxi Record Corp
Strangers of the Night	18 October 2018	Roxi Record Corp
Electric Heart	24 April 2020	Roxi Record Corp

=== Singles ===
Title	Release date	Label	Album
"Run All Night (Chase This Dream)"	29 June 2017	Self-released	Girl on the TV and Strangers of the Night
"See It In Your Eyes"	19 September 2017	Self-released	Girl on the TV
"Dangerous" (with Juno Dreams)	31 May 2019	Self-released	Electric Heart
"Night Waves"	9 June 2019	Self-released	Non-album single
"Breathe You"	10 January 2020	Self-released	Electric Heart
"Polybius (Arcade Killer)"	8 May 2020	Self-released	Non-album single
"Never Find Another"	14 August 2020	Self-released	Non-album single
"1985"	2 October 2020	Self-released	Non-album single
"Come to Me" (with Voynich)	30 October 2020	Self-released	Non-album single
"Hot Night (Outrun Version)"	26 December 2020	Roxi Records	Non-album single
"Make Me Scream"	18 February 2022	Roxi Records	Non-album single
"Don't Mess With My Heart"	09 September 2022	Roxi Records	Non-album single
"Obsession"	28 July 2023	Roxi Records	Obsession

=== As featured artist ===
Title	Release date	Label	Album
"Focus Every Scene" (Spectral Knight featuring Roxi Drive)	30 September 2020	TW1 Records; RetroSynth Records	Non-album single
