= Nightmare (Tuesday Knight song) =

Single by Tuesday Knight

from the album Faith, Nightmare
- Released: August 19, 1988 (film), September 2012 (album release), 2015 (official single release)
- Recorded: 1988; Los Angeles, California
- Genre: AOR, pop rock
- Length: 2:10 (Faith version)
- Label: Knight and Day Records
- Songwriters: Tuesday Knight, Michael Egizi
- Producers: Tuesday Knight, Michael Egizi

Tuesday Knight singles chronology
"Out of Control" (1987)	"Nightmare" (1988)	"Ivory Tower" (1989)

"Nightmare", also known as "(Running From This) Nightmare", is a song by American recording artist and actress Tuesday Knight. The song serves as the opening song for the fourth installment of the Nightmare on Elm Street franchise, A Nightmare on Elm Street 4: The Dream Master, in which Knight co-starred. Although not officially released as a single or included on the original soundtrack for the film at the time, "Nightmare" has become a cult hit among horror fans and is one of Knight's most well-known and signature songs. It was released officially as a single in 2015.

== Background ==
In 1987, Tuesday Knight released her self-titled debut album. The following year, she was chosen to replace Patricia Arquette in the role of Kristen Parker in the film A Nightmare on Elm Street 4: The Dream Master. Before production wrapped on The Dream Master, Knight met with director Renny Harlin and pitched the idea of writing a song for the film. She and her writing partner Michael Egizi recorded the song within two days, before playing the tape for Harlin in his car. Impressed, he handed the tape over to the music department without any further involvement from Knight. Unaware if the song would be used, she was surprised to find it serving as the film's introductory theme.

The song starts just as the revitalized 1988 New Line Cinema logo fades out (the first Elm Street to feature said logo), and plays over the opening credits, featuring a girl on a sidewalk, drawing with chalk. The camera pulls back from the Elm Street house to introduce Knight's character, and the song fades into Charles Bernstein's score from the original film.

== Release ==
Due to licensing issues, the song did not originally receive an official single release or appear on the original soundtrack for the film, and Knight was never compensated for her contribution. Aside from the film, the song wasn't publicly accessible for years. An audio recording was later ripped from the film and featured on Knight's 2012 compilation album, Faith, the song's first official release.

In 2015, it was announced that the song had been remastered, remixed, and rerecorded, and is expected to receive an official extended play CD and digital download release before the end of the year. The album is produced by Tuesday Knight, Michael Perez and is designed by Dakota Thomas.

== Track listing ==
Nightmare EP
No.	Title	Length
1.	"Nightmare (1988 Movie Version)"	2:25
2.	"Nightmare (1988 Movie HQ Mix)"	2:37
3.	"Nightmare (Studio Version)"	2:38
4.	"Nightmare (DJ Sasha Remix)"	3:06
5.	"Nightmare (Instrumental)"	2:38
6.	"Nightmare (The Flight Away Version)"	4:38
7.	"Nightmare (The Flight Away Instrumental)"	4:38

Bonus Tracks
No.	Title	Length
8.	"Every Breath You Take (From The Profiler (TV series))"	4:14
9.	"Ivory Tower (From The Motion Picture "Mad About You")"	2:54
10.	"Maria (Acoustic Dub)"	3:38
11.	"Why You Wanna Treat Me So Bad?"	4:04
12.	"25 Cent Girl"	4:03
13.	"The Harder You Love"	4:30
14.	"Out Of Control (Tuesday Morning Mix)"	6:46

== Personnel ==
2015 Release:

- Executive Producer: Michael Perez
- Producer: Tuesday Knight, Michael Perez
- Design: Dakota Thomas
