= One for My Baby – To Frank Sinatra with Love =

Studio album by Laura Dickinson
- Released: December 12, 2014
- Genre: Jazz
- Labels: Music & Mirror Records

One for my Baby – To Frank Sinatra With Love is American jazz singer Laura Dickinson's debut album, which was released by Music & Mirror Records on December 12, 2014 in celebration of Frank Sinatra's 99th birthday and centennial year.

== Track listing ==
1. "Come Fly With Me" (Jimmy Van Heusen, Sammy Cahn) – 3:34
2. "Learnin' The Blues" (Dolores Vicki Silvers) – 3:05
3. "(Love Is) The Tender Trap" (Jimmy Van Heusen, Sammy Cahn) – 2:33
4. "Guess I'll Hang My Tears Out To Dry" (Jule Styne, Sammy Cahn) – 4:34
5. "You're Getting To Be A Habit With Me" (Harry Warren, Al Dubin) – 3:13
6. "Here's To The Losers" (Robert Wells, Jack Segal) – 2:45
7. "Indian Summer" (Victor Herbert, Al Dubin) – 3:36
8. "You Go To My Head" (J. Fred Coots, Haven Gillespie) – 5:07
9. "How About You?" (Burton Lane, Ralph Freed) – 3:08
10. "The Best Is Yet to Come" (Cy Coleman, Carolyn Leigh) – 3:15
11. "I Only Have Eyes For You" (featuring Danny Jacob) (Harry Warren, Al Dubin) – 3:56
12. "My Funny Valentine" (featuring Neil Stubenhaus) (Richard Rodgers, Lorenz Hart) – 5:09
13. "I'm Gonna Live Till I Die" (Curtis/Hoffman/Kent) – 2:52
14. "All The Way" (Jimmy Van Heusen, Sammy Cahn) – 4:05
15. "One For My Baby" (featuring Vince di Mura) (Harold Arlen, Johnny Mercer) – 4:29

== Selected personnel ==
- Laura Dickinson – vocals
- Gordon Goodwin – arranger
- Quincy Jones – arranger
- John Clayton (bassist) – arranger
- Sammy Nestico – arranger
- Marty Paich – arranger
- Neil Stubenhaus – bass guitar
- Randy Kerber – piano
- Danny Jacob – guitar
- Chuck Findley – trumpet
- Wayne Bergeron – trumpet
