= Goodbye Cruel World (James Darren song) =

Single by James Darren

from the album Sings for All Sizes
- B-side: "Valerie"
- Released: October 1961
- Length: 2:27
- Label: Colpix
- Songwriter: Gloria Shayne

James Darren singles chronology
"Because They're Young" (1960)	"Goodbye Cruel World" (1961)	"Her Royal Majesty" (1961)

"Goodbye Cruel World" is a song written by Gloria Shayne Baker and recorded by James Darren in 1961.

== Background ==
The song is about a man whose heart was broken by a "mean fickle woman", and his plan to join the circus as a brokenhearted clown. He does not mind being shot out of a cannon, and plans to tell the world that she "made a crying clown" out of him. According to disc jockeys at the time the song was released, the calliope-like riff used in the song based on the "Entrance of the Gladiators" theme, was a synthesized recording of a woman's voice rather than a musical instrument.

== Chart history ==
Darren scored his first top ten hit on the U.S. Billboard Hot 100, at number three. On the Cash Box Top 100, it spent two weeks at number two. It would prove the biggest hit of his career on this chart, as well as on the UK Singles Chart (no. 28).

Chart (1961–62)	Peak position
Canada (CHUM)	1
New Zealand (Lever)	3
UK (OCC)	28
US Billboard Hot 100	3
US Cash Box Top 100	2
