= Let's Be Frank =

Studio album by Trisha Yearwood
- Released: December 20, 2018 (Williams-Sonoma); February 14, 2019 (Wide)
- Recorded: Summer 2018
- Studio: Capitol (Hollywood, California)
- Genre: Jazz
- Length: 47:03
- Label: Gwendolyn
- Producer: Don Was

Trisha Yearwood chronology
Christmas Together (2016)	Let's Be Frank (2018)	Every Girl (2019)

Let's Be Frank is the fourteenth studio album by American country artist Trisha Yearwood. It was first released through Williams Sonoma stores on December 20, 2018 and was widely released on February 14, 2019 via Gwendolyn Records. The project was produced by Don Was and arranged by Vincent Mendoza. The album pays tribute to Frank Sinatra, whom Yearwood had always admired. It was a record that Yearwood had always wanted to create but never got around to doing so. Let's Be Frank includes covers of songs notably performed by Sinatra and also features one original composition.

== Background and production ==
According to Yearwood, she had always wanted to record album of traditional pop songs. She was originally approached by producer Don Was following her televised performance at Frank Sinatra's 2015 "100th Birthday" tribute. The album was recorded in summer 2018 in four days at Capitol Studios in Hollywood, California. She performed the tracks with Sinatra's original microphone and was accompanied by a 55-piece orchestra. Let's Be Frank was arranged by Vincent Mendoza. Yearwood called the collaboration with Mendoza something she "couldn't be more proud of". She also noted his previous work with Tony Bennett, Ray Charles and Barbra Streisand.

Yearwood drew inspiration for Let's Be Frank from her childhood. In an interview with iHeart Radio, Yearwood explained that her mother was fond of Frank Sinatra and for that reason, she "grew up" listening to him. She also mentioned that many of the songs Sinatra recorded were covered by other artists. These songs also appeared in films and television shows that she watched as a young child.

== Content ==
According to Yearwood, the material for Let's Be Frank originated from the Great American Songbook catalog. While many of these songs had been recorded by Frank Sinatra, their original versions by other artists may be more memorable. Two notable recordings she covered by Sinatra included "Come Fly with Me" and "One for My Baby (and One More for the Road)". Yearwood also noted that "Come Fly with Me" was one of the most challenging songs to record because of its rhythm. The track "I'll Be Seeing You" was an especially emotional song to sing, according to Yearwood. She commented in 2019 that the song made her think of her mother, Gwen.

The track "For the Last Time" originally was a line that Yearwood had thought of. Her husband Garth Brooks assisted by composing a melody to accompany her idea. It is the only original composition to appear on the album. Yearwood commented in 2019 that she not want the song to appear on Let's Be Frank because she feared it would disrespect the music of Sinatra. She was encouraged to play the song to her producer Don Was. Was enjoyed the song and arranged for the track to be recorded for the project.

== Critical reception ==
Let's Be Frank received critical acclaim upon its major release to stores. Stephen Thomas Erlewine of AllMusic called the album not exactly "the kind of comeback most observers would've expected from Trisha Yearwood." Erlewine went on to call the record a "well-balanced songbook" that included diverse arrangements and song choices. Kevin John Coyne of Country Universe gave Let's Be Frank four of five possible stars in his review. Coyne highlighted tracks such as "One for My Baby (and One More for the Road)" and "For the Last Time". He also compared Yearwood's song selection to that of Emmylou Harris and Linda Ronstadt. Coyne later concluded his review of the album by saying, "Let's Be Frank is a delightful detour, and while it doesn't curb the hunger for more country music from the greatest female artist of the greatest generation of female artists, it is chock full of reminders of how she earned that distinction in the first place."

== Commercial performance ==
Let's Be Frank was first issued on December 20, 2018 exclusively through Williams-Sonoma retailers. It was officially released to all major retailers on February 14, 2019. Both of these releases were distributed through Gwendolyn Records. Upon its initial release, the album would peak at number 2 on the Billboard Jazz Albums chart and number 7 on the Billboard Top Independent Albums chart. Let's Be Frank marked Yearwood's first solo album since 2007's Heaven, Heartache and the Power of Love and first to chart as well. Yearwood made numerous promotional appearances to support the album. She made her first appearance when launching songs off the album at the Rainbow Room in New York City. This included a performance of "For the First Time" on The Today Show in early 2019.

== Track listing ==
Standard edition
No.	Title	Writer(s)	Length
1.	"Witchcraft"	Cy Coleman; Carolyn Leigh	4:14
2.	"Drinking Again"	Johnny Mercer; Doris Tauber	2:55
3.	"All the Way"	Sammy Cahn; Jimmy Van Heusen	4:36
4.	"Come Fly with Me"	Cahn; Van Heusen	3:10
5.	"Over the Rainbow"	Harold Arlen; E.Y. Harburg	4:32
6.	"One for My Baby (and One More for the Road)"	Arlen; Mercer	4:29
7.	"They All Laughed"	George Gershwin; Ira Gershwin	3:13
8.	"If I Loved You"	Oscar Hammerstein II; Richard Rodgers	4:07
9.	"The Man That Got Away"	Arlen; I. Gershwin	4:15
10.	"The Lady Is a Tramp"	Lorenz Hart; Rogers	3:35
11.	"For the Last Time"	Garth Brooks; Trisha Yearwood	3:51
12.	"I'll Be Seeing You"	Sammy Fain; Irving Kahal	4:06
Total length:			47:03

== Personnel ==
All credits are adapted from AllMusic.

Musical personnel

- Trisha Yearwood – vocals
- Alan Pasqua – grand piano
- Chuck Berghofer – bass
- Peter Erskine – drums
- Vince Mendoza – arrangements and conductor
- Bruce Dukov – concertmaster

Brass and Woodwinds

- Gene Cipriano – tenor saxophone
- Rose Coorigan – bassoon
- Jeff Driskill – clarinet, flute, tenor saxophone
- Dan Higgins – clarinet, flute, alto saxophone
- Greg Huckins – clarinet, flute, alto saxophone, baritone saxophone
- Damian Montano – bassoon
- Adam Schroeder – bass clarinet, baritone saxophone
- Bob Sheppard – clarinet, alto flute, tenor saxophone
- Lara Wickes – oboe
- Ryan Dragon – trombone, tenor trombone
- Julianne Gralle – trombone
- Andrew Martin – bass trombone
- Bob McChesney – trombone
- Charlie Morillas – tenor trombone
- Wayne Bergeron – trumpet
- Gary Grant – trumpet
- Larry Hall – trumpet
- Michael Rocha – trumpet
- Bob Schaer – trumpet
- Jim Self – tuba
- Annie Bosler – French horn
- Laura Brenes – French horn
- Dylan Hart – French horn

String Section

- Jacob Braun, Stephen Erdody, Ross Gasworth, Dennis Karmazyn, Michael Kaufman, Armen Ksajikian, Laszlo Mezo, Cecilla Tsan and Charles Tyler – cello
- Ed Beares and Milke Valerio – contrabass
- Marcia Dickstein – harp
- Rob Brophy, Zach Dellinger, Brian Dembrow, Andrew Duckles, Alma Fernandez, Shawn Mann, Luke Maurer and Darrin McCann – viola
- Armen Anassian, Charlie Bisharat, Roberto Cani, David Ewart, Pam Gates, Julie Gigante, Jessica E. Gudieri, Tamara Hatwan, Ana Landauer, Songa Lee, Natalie Leggett, Phillip Levy, Lisa Liu, Helen Nightengale, Grace Oh, Carol Pool, Irina Voloshina, Amy Wickman and Leah Zeger – violin

== Production ==
- Don Was – producer
- Jeff Fitzpatrick – engineer
- Steve Genewick – engineer
- Al Schmitt – engineer, mixing
- Eric Boulanger – mastering
- Ivy Skoff – production coordinator
- Rachel Jones – production assistant
- Jo Ann Kane – music copyist
- Josef Zimmerman – music librarian
- Russ Harrington – photography

== Charts ==
Chart (2019)	Peak position
US Top Jazz Albums (Billboard)	2
US Independent Albums (Billboard)	7
