= The Man from the 25th Century =

- Genre: Science fiction
- Screenplay by: Irwin Allen
- Story by: Irwin Allen
- Directed by: Irwin Allen
- Starring: James Darren; John Crawford; Patrick Culliton; John Napier; Ford Rainey
- Country of origin: United States
- Original language: English

Production
- Producer: Irwin Allen
- Running time: 17 min
- Production companies: CBS; Irwin Allen Productions; The Man From the 25th Century Company; 20th Century Fox

Original release
- Network: CBS
- Release: 1968

Related
- Lost in Space

The Man from the 25th Century is a 1968 American short film written, directed and produced by Irwin Allen. It was intended as a pilot for a new TV series, a spin-off of Lost in Space, but the series never sold.

== Synopsis ==
As a child, Robert Prentiss was abducted from 20th-century Topeka, Kansas, by aliens who claim to be 500 years more advanced than humans. After years of training and conditioning, the adult Prentiss is sent back to Earth with a mission: To destroy Project Delphi and their system that prevents alien invasions. Prentiss, however, finds that he cannot allow the aliens to attack Earth, so he tries to help Delphi to repel them.

== Cast ==
- James Darren as Tomo / Robert Prentiss
- John Crawford as Bonti
- John Napier as Karl Baldwin
- Ford Rainey as General George Atwood
- Patrick Culliton
