= Out of Control (Tuesday Knight song) =

Single by Tuesday Knight

from the album Tuesday Knight
- Released: August 20, 1987
- Recorded: 1987; Los Angeles, California
- Length: 4:45 (album version)
- Label: CBS Records
- Songwriter(s): Frank Wildhorn, Bob Marlette
- Producer(s): Frank Wildhorn, Karl Richardson, Bob Marlette

Tuesday Knight singles chronology
"Out of Control" (1987)	"Nightmare" (1988)

"Out of Control" is the opening track and lead single of the eponymous debut album of American recording artist and actress Tuesday Knight. The song was released by Parc/CBS Records on August 20, 1987.

== Background ==
"Out of Control" was written by Bob Marlette and album producer, Frank Wildhorn, who had yet to become well known for his Broadway musical Jekyll & Hyde, of which Knight appeared on the original demo.

The song received decent exposure in dance clubs, and was promoted with a music video. The song was later featured on Knight's 2012 compilation album, Faith.

== Track listings ==
12" Vinyl
No.	Title	Length
1.	"Out of Control (12" Club Mix)"	7:15
2.	"Out of Control (Power Mix)"	6:03
3.	"Out of Control (12" Dub Club Mix)"	6:46
4.	"Out of Control (Tuesday Morning Mix)"	5:59

7" Vinyl promo
No.	Title	Length
1.	"Out of Control"	4:45
2.	"Out of Control"	4:45

7" Vinyl
No.	Title	Length
1.	"Out of Control"	4:45
2.	"You're Gonna Need Somebody"	3:56
