= Small Town Girl (1953 film) =

1953 musical film

- Theatrical release poster
- Directed by: László Kardos
- Screenplay by: Dorothy Cooper; Dorothy Kingsley
- Story by: Dorothy Cooper
- Produced by: Joe Pasternak
- Starring: Jane Powell; Farley Granger; Ann Miller; S. Z. Sakall; Robert Keith; Nat King Cole; Billie Burke; Bobby Van
- Cinematography: Joseph Ruttenberg
- Edited by: Albert Akst
- Music by: Nicholas Brodszky; André Previn; Albert Sendrey
- Production company: Metro-Goldwyn-Mayer
- Distributed by: Loew's Inc.
- Release date: April 10, 1953
- Running time: 92 minutes
- Country: United States
- Language: English
- Budget: $1,438,000
- Box office: $2,127,000

Small Town Girl is a 1953 American Technicolor musical film directed by László Kardos and starring Jane Powell, Farley Granger and Ann Miller, with Busby Berkeley as choreographer. The film's soundtrack features performances by Bobby Van and Nat King Cole. The film was nominated for the Academy Award for Best Original Song, "My Flaming Heart", with music by Nicholas Brodszky and lyrics by Leo Robin. The film is not related to the 1936 MGM film of the same title.

== Plot ==
Rick Belrow Livingston, on his way to elope with self-obsessed Broadway star Lisa Bellmount, is sentenced to 30 days in jail for speeding through a small town. He meets the judge's daughter Cindy Kimbell and persuades her to free him for one night by claiming that he wants to see his sick mother, but Rick instead visits Lisa. Cindy spends a night out with Rick and starts to fall for him, but Papa Schlemmer wants her to marry his son, who aspires to perform on Broadway.

== Cast ==
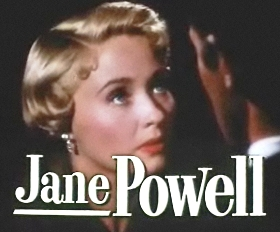
Jane Powell as Cindy Kimbell

- Jane Powell as Cindy Kimbell
- Farley Granger as Rick Belrow Livingston
- Ann Miller as Lisa Bellmount
- S. Z. Sakall as "Papa" Eric Schlemmer
- Robert Keith as Judge Gordon Kimbell
- Bobby Van as Ludwig Schlemmer
- Billie Burke as Mrs. Livingston
- Fay Wray as Mrs. Gordon Kimbell
- Chill Wills as Happy
- Nat King Cole as himself
- Dean Miller as Mac
- William Campbell as Ted
- Philip Tonge as Hemmingway
- Jonathan Cott as Jim
- Bobby Yatt as Dennis
- Rudy Lee as Jimmy
- Beverly Wills as Deidre
- Gloria Noble as Patsy
- Jane Liddell as Betty
- Nancy Valentine as Mary
- Janet Stewart as Sandra
- Peggy McIntyre as Susie
- Virginia Hall as "girlfriend"

== Production ==
Country music star Hank Williams was reportedly offered the small role of the sheriff by MGM producer Joe Pasternak but declined.

== Reception ==
In a contemporary review for The New York Times, critic Howard Thompson wrote: "[T]hat seasoned impresario, Joseph Pasternak, the producer, has mechanized a dandy array of talent along wholesome but standard lines. Minus, we might add, the two most important ingredients of any musical, originality and pace. ... [T]he two lady scenarists, Dorothy Cooper and Dorothy Kingsley, have whipped up an unsurprising batter of folksy, more often plain slick and generally redundant gags. ... Fortunately, the musical sequences that unfurl at the drop of a cliché are performed and staged with shiny competence."

According to MGM records, the film earned $1,365,000 in the U.S. and Canada and $762,000 elsewhere, resulting in a loss of $287,000.

== Legacy ==
Early in the film, Bobby Van as Ludwig Schlemmer performs “Take Me to Broadway”, a spectacular song and dance number in which Ludwig, dressed in top hat, white tie and tails and twirling a cane, dances in the store, leaping from counters to railings and back. When Cindy later refuses his proposal, he leaves her house and begins jumping for joy, hopping all over town to a perky refrain, ending with the line “Take me to Broadway”, delivered to the camera. The "Jumping Song" has been referenced in commercials and music videos, including that for Goldfrapp's song "Happiness". Peter Wolf also recreated the scene in the music video for his 1987 song "Come as You Are". At the 2014 Tony Awards, Hugh Jackman hopped in his intro and viewed Van's dance on a television set backstage. The number was featured in Jack Haley Jr.'s 1985 film That's Dancing!, a celebration of dance in American film.
