= I Still Believe (Hayden Panettiere song) =

Single by Hayden Panettiere

from the album Cinderella III: A Twist in Time
- Released: 2 March 2007
- Recorded: 2007
- Genre: Folk-pop; pop rock; country pop
- Length: 3:27
- Label: Walt Disney
- Songwriters: Matthew Gerrard; Bridget Benenate
- Producer: Matthew Gerrard

Hayden Panettiere singles chronology
"Your New Girlfriend" (2006)	"I Still Believe" (2007)	"Wake Up Call" (2008)

"I Still Believe" is a song composed and written by Matthew Gerrard and Bridget Benenate, and performed by Hayden Panettiere for the Disney 2007 animated direct-to-video American animated musical fantasy film Cinderella III: A Twist in Time. It is a ballad which explores the enduring belief in love and destiny. The lyrics convey a sense of resilience and determination to hold onto the belief that love can conquer obstacles and lead to a brighter future. It was the fourth song she sang and recorded for Disney after "Cruella De Vil" for Disneymania 5.

The song is played during the end credits of the film, which showcases pictures of the characters in the Cinderella franchise living their new happily ever after.

== Background ==
Actress Hayden Panettiere, having provided the voice of Princess Dot in A Bug's Life and Suri in Dinosaur, as well Dot in the A Bug's Life video game and Kairi and Xion in the Kingdom Hearts video game series, recorded the film's theme song, "I Still Believe", one of her earliest attempts to establish a music career.

== Music video ==
The music video features Hayden Panettiere sitting amid a field of flowers, walking in a black and white world, coloring it with each step as she walks, eventually meeting her boyfriend, and the video also uses clips from the movie. The music video was heavily rotated on Disney Channel at the time and was included as a bonus feature on the film's DVD.

== Release ==
It was released on the Cinderella III: A Twist in Time soundtrack on March 2, 2007.

== Reception ==
The song received mixed reviews from the critics.

Prior to the song's release, as well as that of the film and the soundtrack, Michael Slezak, of Entertainment Weekly, wrote, "Hayden Panettiere, 'I Still Believe': Alas, this isn’t a cover of Brenda K. Starr’s delicious, cheese-flavored late-’80s ballad (later covered by Mariah Carey in 1999), but rather an inspirational ditty from the soundtrack to Cinderella III: A Twist in Time. I warn you, PopWatchers, Heroes‘ cheerleader’s song (streaming at her MySpace page) begins with this lyrical nugget: 'Somehow I know I will find a way/ To a brighter day/ In the sun…' And as for that brutally wonky finishing note? If HRG wanted to kill Sylar, he should’ve just put it on repeatloop. C’mon, Hayden, you’re not earning enough fun money with that Neutrogena gig?"

Ben Simon, writing for Animated Views, wrote, "Performed by Hayden Panettiere, another of the Mouse House’s seemingly inexhaustible supply of teenage songstresses, this 3:30 minute version of the movie’s end credit song, a pretty decent pop anthem, is your standard promo clip, with a dash of Pleasantville about it as Hayden spreads color throughout the land as she sings. Presented in 4×3 and cut in with scenes from Cinders III this is as well produced and catchy as it needs to be".

David Cornelius of DVD Talk wrote, "The film's theme song, 'I Still Believe,' gets the music video treatment with a performance by Hayden Panettiere. Considering Disney's penchant for using and reusing their own in-house line-up, I'm somewhat surprised to find somebody who isn't Raven-Symone or Ashley Tisdale here".

Ed Perkis, writer and critic for CinemaBlend, wrote, "' Heroes ' star Hayden Panettiere has a music video for 'I Still Believe.' The video is in heavy rotation on the Disney Channel and is the type of innocuous pop fluff that turned Hilary Duff into a hit machine for the pre-teen set. Despite the fact that it is only about 3 minutes long and isn't particularly interesting, it is the most substantial extra on the disc".

Lisa Perkis, writing for MousePlanet, wrote about the music video, "As expected, the extras are pretty scarce. 'I Still Believe,' the music video of the song which plays over the closing credits is included and features the very golden and very pretty Hayden Panettiere from the current TV show Heroes and from past Disney movies such as Ice Princess and Tiger Cruise. This video is getting a lot of play on the Disney Channel right now, so it will likely be old news by the time your kids get around to playing this on the DVD".

Aaron Wallace wrote, "The music video (3:38) is for a pop song called 'I Still Believe' (no, it's not a Mariah Carey cover) by Hayden Panettiere, a teenaged veteran of Disney fare who sings and is part of the cast of NBC's freshman hit 'Heroes.' Intermixed with clips from the movie, the music video is a pretty standard one. The song itself is likable if unexceptional".
