= The Tijuana Story =

1957 film by Leslie Kardos

- Film poster
- Directed by: László Kardos (as Leslie Kardos)
- Written by: Lou Morheim
- Produced by: Sam Katzman
- Cinematography: Benjamin H. Kline
- Edited by: Edwin H. Bryant
- Production company: Clover Productions
- Distributed by: Columbia Pictures
- Release date: October 1957
- Running time: 73 minutes
- Country: United States
- Language: English

The Tijuana Story is a 1957 American film noir crime film directed by László Kardos (credited as Leslie Kardos). It stars Rodolfo Acosta as Manuel Acosta Mesa, a Mexican journalist who confronts a powerful crime syndicate in Tijuana. The film draws inspiration from the true story of Manuel Acosta Meza, a Tijuana journalist assassinated in 1956 for his efforts to expose organized crime and corruption.

== Plot ==
In April 1956, schoolteacher Alberto Rodriguez arrives at the office of the El Sol newspaper in Tijuana, Mexico, seeking help from its editor, Manuel Acosta Mesa. Alberto has been severely beaten by members of a local crime syndicate after reporting that one of their operatives, Miguel Fuentes, was selling drugs near a school. After collapsing and being rushed to the hospital, Alberto's plight drives Manuel to confront Peron Diaz, a notorious crime boss operating out of a nightclub managed by an American, Eddie March. During the confrontation, Manuel demands that Peron cover Alberto's medical expenses but is instead attacked by Peron's enforcers. Eddie, grappling with his conscience, helps Manuel escape.

Peron tries to neutralize Manuel's anti-crime campaign by offering a lucrative advertising deal to Reuben Galindo, the owner of El Sol, on the condition that Manuel tones down his editorials. When Galindo informs Peron that Manuel's contract grants him full editorial control, Peron resorts to threatening Galindo's family. Meanwhile, a group of American teenagers visits Tijuana seeking adventure. One of them, Mitch, makes an inappropriate advance toward Linda Alvarez, Manuel's secretary, but she firmly rebuffs him. Later, Mitch encounters a bar girl at Eddie's nightclub, who persuades him to buy marijuana. Angered by the drug trade happening at his club, Eddie objects to Peron's men, but they dismiss his concerns.

Struggling with his involvement in Peron's operations, Eddie confides in his pregnant wife, Liz, that he feels trapped by financial dependency on the syndicate. Simultaneously, Galindo, worried about his family's safety, asks Manuel to soften his criticism of the syndicate. Manuel temporarily complies, but after Alberto dies from his injuries, he renews his efforts to expose Peron. Mitch, now remorseful, returns to Tijuana to apologize to Linda, and the two begin a relationship. However, when police find marijuana residue in Mitch's car, they attempt to arrest him. Panicking, Mitch flees and drowns. Deeply affected by Mitch's death, Manuel vows to take down Peron.

Using funds from buying out his contract at El Sol, Manuel launches a new reform-focused newspaper, El Imparcial, with his son Enrique as co-editor. Despite intimidation tactics from the syndicate, Manuel gains support from California newspapers. Fearing wider exposure, a crime syndicate in California orders Peron to kill Manuel. Peron enlists Miguel, who is imprisoned for drug offenses, to carry out the assassination. Miguel is temporarily released from jail through a bribe, but his drug cravings lead him to Eddie's club. There, Eddie discovers the plot and alerts the police, who apprehend Miguel before he can harm Manuel.

Peron's men, realizing Eddie has betrayed them, pursue him and Liz. After being forced off the road, Eddie fights back while Liz retrieves a gun and scares the attackers away. Determined to expose the syndicate, Eddie resolves to testify. However, before Manuel can present evidence at a legislative hearing, he is killed outside his home. At his funeral, Galindo rallies the community to stand against the syndicate, while Enrique continues his father's mission through El Imparcial.

== Cast ==
- Rodolfo Acosta as Manuel Acosta Mesa
- James Darren as Mitch
- Robert McQueeney as Eddie March
- Jean Willes as Liz March
- Joy Stoner as Linda
- Paul Newlan as Peron Diaz
- George E. Stone as Pino
- Michael Fox as Reuben Galindo
- Robert Blake as Enrique Acosta Mesa
- William Fawcett as Alberto Rodriguez
- Paul Coates as himself - the Narrator

== History ==
The film is based on the life and death of Manuel Acosta Meza, editor of El Imparcial, who was known for his investigative reporting on organized crime in Tijuana. On July 26, 1956, Acosta Meza was murdered at his home, a crime attributed to his fearless exposés on the criminal syndicates in the city. The following year, Manuel Duenas was sentenced to six years in prison for his involvement, though other suspected individuals were not identified or prosecuted publicly.

Journalist Paul Coates narrated the film, as he had broken the original story on Acosta Meza's death. The production was shot on location in Mexico to capture the original atmosphere of Tijuana.

A bust of Acosta Meza now stands in Tijuana, near a local monument to freedom of speech, honoring his commitment to exposing corruption. The film, though produced with modest resources, continues to serve as a cinematic reflection on press freedom and the dangers faced by journalists.

== See also ==
- List of American films of 1957
