= This One's from the Heart =

Studio album by James Darren
- Released: August 24, 1999
- Recorded: June 1999
- Studio: Capitol Studios, Los Angeles, California
- Genre: Standards
- Length: 52:40
- Label: Concord
- Producer: John Burk

James Darren chronology
The Best of James Darren (1994)	This One's from the Heart (1999)	Because of You (2001)

Professional ratings
Review scores
Source	Rating
All About Jazz	2/5 stars
AllMusic	3/5 stars
JazzTimes	(unfavorable)

This One's from the Heart is a collection of songs which James Darren sang on Star Trek: Deep Space Nine as the hologram Vic Fontaine. One song he performed on the show was "The Alamo", which was written specially for the show by Jay Chattaway, and does not appear on the CD.

== Track listing ==
1. "The Best Is Yet to Come" (from "Badda-Bing Badda-Bang")
2. "Come Fly with Me" (from "His Way")
3. "That Old Black Magic"
4. "All the Way (from "Image in the Sand")
5. "It's Only a Paper Moon" (from "It's Only a Paper Moon")
6. "I've Got the World on a String" (from "It's Only a Paper Moon")
7. "You'd Better Love Me"
8. "Sophisticated Lady"
9. "Just in Time" (from "It's Only a Paper Moon")
10. "I've Got You Under My Skin" (from "His Way")
11. "The Way You Look Tonight" (from "What You Leave Behind")
12. "Here's to the Losers" (from "Tears of the Prophets")
13. "You're Nobody till Somebody Loves You" (from "His Way")
14. "Dancing in the Dark"
15. "Night and Day"
16. "I'll Be Seeing You" (from "The Siege of AR-558" & "It's Only a Paper Moon")
17. "Satin Doll"

== Charts ==
Chart	Peak position
US Top Jazz Albums (Billboard)	25
