= Because of You (James Darren album) =

Studio album by James Darren
- Released: July 10, 2001
- Recorded: March 2001
- Studio: Capitol Studios, Los Angeles, California; G Studio Digital, Los Angeles
- Length: 50:47
- Label: Concord

James Darren chronology
| This One's from the Heart (1999) | Because of You (2001) | Live! For the First Time (2019) |

Professional ratings
Review scores
| Source | Rating |
|---|---|
| AllMusic | 4/5 stars |

Because of You is an album released by James Darren in 2001.

== Track listing ==
| No. | Title | Writer(s) | Length |
|---|---|---|---|
| 1. | "Just One of Those Things" | Cole Porter | 3:12 |
| 2. | "My Kind of Girl" | Leslie Bricusse | 3:10 |
| 3. | "Can't Take My Eyes Off You" | Bob Crewe, Bob Gaudio | 4:46 |
| 4. | "A Nightingale Sang In Berkeley Square" | Eric Maschwitz, Manning Sherwin | 2:44 |
| 5. | "More Today Than Yesterday" | Pat Upton | 2:57 |
| 6. | "Blame It On My Youth" | Edward Heyman, Oscar Levant | 4:54 |
| 7. | "Because of You" | Arthur Hammerstein, Dudley Wilkinson | 2:19 |
| 8. | "Good Life" | Sacha Distel, Jean Broussolle | 3:07 |
| 9. | "I'm a Fool to Want You" | Joel Herron, Frank Sinatra, Jack Wolf | 5:14 |
| 10. | "Boulevard of Broken Dreams" | Al Dubin, Harry Warren | 4:04 |
| 11. | "Our Day Will Come" | Mort Garson, Bob Hilliard | 2:32 |
| 12. | "I Can't Give You Anything But Love" | Dorothy Fields, Jimmy McHugh | 2:39 |
| 13. | "My Old Flame" | Sam Coslow, Arthur Johnston | 4:42 |
| 14. | "Dream a Little Dream of Me" | Fabian Andre, Gus Kahn, Wilbur Schwandt | 4:27 |
| Total length: | | | 50:47 |

== Charts ==
| Chart | Peak position |
|---|---|
| US Top Jazz Albums (Billboard) | 13 |
