= 2000 Malibu Road =

American soap opera

- Promotional image
- Genre: Soap opera
- Created by: Terry Louise Fisher
- Written by: Kimberly Costello; Terry Louise Fisher
- Directed by: Joel Schumacher
- Starring: Drew Barrymore; Jennifer Beals; Brian Bloom; Scott Bryce; Lisa Hartman; Tuesday Knight; Michael T. Weiss
- Theme music composer: James Newton Howard
- Composer: Marty Davich
- Country of origin: United States
- Original language: English
- No. of seasons: 1
- No. of episodes: 6

Production
- Executive producers: Terry Louise Fisher; Joel Schumacher; Aaron Spelling; E. Duke Vincent
- Producer: Darren Frankel
- Production companies: Fisher Entertainment; Joel Schumacher Productions; Spelling Television

Original release
- Network: CBS
- Release: August 23 – September 9, 1992

2000 Malibu Road is an American prime time soap opera television series that aired on CBS from August 23 to September 9, 1992. The series stars Drew Barrymore, Jennifer Beals, Brian Bloom, Scott Bryce, Lisa Hartman, Tuesday Knight and Michael T. Weiss.

== Series overview ==
The show deals with four women living together at a beach house located at 2000 Malibu Road. Lisa Hartman plays Jade, a former prostitute trying to get out of the profession. Jennifer Beals plays Perry, a young lawyer also escaping from her past (a slain fiancé police officer and a serious drinking problem). Drew Barrymore plays Lindsay, a would-be actress trying to get the right break. Tuesday Knight plays Joy, Lindsay's overweight, overprotective, two-faced, manipulative sister, who also serves as her agent. Jade is the owner of the beach house. In order to leave her profession as a high priced prostitute, she takes in roommates to help her pay the rent.

The series ends with several unresolved cliffhangers. Jade discovers her stepfather Porter was working with her former client Hal (Robert Foxworth), and had been trying to kill her. After arguing with Lindsay upon discovering she was sleeping with Eric (Brian Bloom), Joy is struck by lightning. The final scene shows Perry being raped and beaten by Roger (Michael T. Weiss) in a stairwell.

=== International ending ===
When the series was screened overseas, two scenes were added to the finale. One with Porter's men shooting Hal dead (and making it look like a suicide) after writing a confession blaming him for the murder of which Jade is accused, and another of Sgt. Muñoz breaking the news to Jade in bed that all charges against her had been dropped. This was followed by a montage of archive footage with a closing narration from Lisa Hartman to provide a perfunctory resolution for the characters. Jade married Muñoz and had a child, and Joy survived being struck by lightning and went back to Chicago to teach astrology at a local college. Lindsay became a world famous actress, while Perry had a breakdown after her rape and ended up institutionalised.

== Cast ==
=== Main ===
- Drew Barrymore as Lindsay Rule, aspiring actress
- Jennifer Beals as Perry Quinn, criminal lawyer struggling with alcoholism
- Lisa Hartman Black as Jade O'Keefe, also known as Victoria "Vicki" Paige Tremont and Sandra Holmes, prostitute and owner of the beach house
- Brian Bloom as Eric Adler, aspiring filmmaker from an industry family
- Scott Bryce as Scott Sterling, television executive and former client of Jade's, who gets blackmailed by Joy
- Tuesday Knight as Joy Rule, Lindsay's manipulative sister and manager
- Ron Marquette as Sgt. Ron Muñoz, cop investigating the murder tied to Jade, most promotional materials give him the first name "Joe", however onscreen he identifies as "Ron" or "Ronny"
- Michael T. Weiss as Roger Tabor, Perry's crush from high school who works at a restaurant and has multiple personality disorder

=== Recurring ===
- Robert Foxworth as Hal Lanford, Jade's client, an alleged lawyer who has a secret agenda
- Mitchell Ryan as Porter Tremont, Jade's stepfather and aspiring political candidate, who molested Jade as a teenager
- Constance Towers as Camilla Tremont, Jade's mother
- Sally Kellerman as Jessica Rolley, neurotic aging actress and Lindsay's potential co-star, who is struggling with sobriety

== Production ==
2000 Malibu Road was created by Terry Louise Fisher. The series was executive produced by Aaron Spelling, E. Duke Vincent, Fisher, and Joel Schumacher, who also served as director.

Drew Barrymore was initially hesitant to star in the series, being "closed off to the idea of [television]"; however, she changed her mind once Schumacher showed her the scripts for the first two episodes. Impressed with her character's development and the numerous plot twists, Barrymore signed onto the series.

According to executive producer Aaron Spelling, producers could not come to terms on license fees with CBS, though Lisa Hartman Black theorized that the premiere of Melrose Place on Fox two months prior was intentionally placed in the same timeslot as 2000 Malibu Road's timeslot on CBS. Spelling thus saw more upside — and fewer issues with Fox standards and practices — with Melrose Place than Malibu, and chose the former instead going forward.

== Episodes ==
Joel Schumaker directed at least the first five of the series' episodes.

List of 2000 Malibu Road episodes
No.	Title	Original release date	Prod. code
1	"Episode 1" "Pilot"	August 23, 1992	2709-001
2	"Episode 2"	August 23, 1992	2709-002
3	"Episode 3"	August 26, 1992	2709-003
4	"Episode 4"	September 2, 1992	2709-004
5	"Episode 5"	September 9, 1992	2709-005
6	"Episode 6"	September 9, 1992	2709-006

== Release and reception ==
"2000 Malibu Road" aired during the summer of 1992. The series' premiere episode earned decent ratings, but ratings fell from there and it was canceled after six episodes.

Sometime in 2008, international sales rights holder ITV Studios released all 6 episodes on DVD in Region 2, using the European transfer from Granada International that was done back in 2005, unlike the American version. as of 2025, is not available to stream on Paramount+ in the United States.
