= László Kardos =

Hungarian film director (1905–1962)

- Born: October 8, 1905; Budapest, Austria-Hungary
- Died: April 11, 1962 (aged 56); Los Angeles, California, U.S.
- Resting place: Hillside Memorial Park Cemetery
- Other name: Leslie Kardos
- Occupations: Film director, screenwriter, editor
- Years active: 1934–1957

László Kardos (October 8, 1905 – April 11, 1962) was a Hungarian film director, screenwriter and editor. He spent the latter part of his film career in the United States where he worked under the pseudonym Leslie Kardos.

He was the son of the printing house owner Gábor Kardos (1860–1929) and Fanni Löbl (1866–1934). His paternal grandparents were Lipót Klein and Rozália Donáth, his maternal grandparents were Mór Löbl and Amália Ebenspanger. His sister was Erzsébet Kardos, a vaudeville actress and the second wife of fellow Hungarian actor S. Z. Sakall.

His wife was Mária "Lenke" Paszternák, sister of the Hungarian-born American film producer Joe Pasternak. They were married on 24 March 1935 in Budapest.

== Filmography ==
=== As director ===
- Viereinhalb Musketiere (1935)
- Barátságos arcot kérek (1936)
- Sportszerelem (1936)
- 120 Kilometres an Hour (1937)
- Dark Streets of Cairo (1940)
- The Strip (1951)
- Small Town Girl (1953)
- The Man Who Turned to Stone (1956)
- The Tijuana Story (1957)

=== As writer ===
- No Leave, No Love (1946), directed by Charles Martin
- Dance with Me, Henry (1956), directed by Charles Barton
