= Her Royal Majesty (song) =

Single by James Darren
- B-side: "If I Could Only Tell You"
- Released: January 1962
- Genre: Rock and roll
- Length: 2:08
- Label: Colpix
- Songwriters: Gerry Goffin, Carole King
- Producer: Stu Phillips

James Darren singles chronology
"Goodbye Cruel World" (1961)	"Her Royal Majesty" (1962)	"Conscience" (1962)

"Her Royal Majesty" is a song written by Gerry Goffin and Carole King and performed by James Darren. The song was arranged and produced by Stu Phillips.

It reached #6 on the U.S. pop chart and #36 on the UK Singles Chart in 1962. The song ranked #80 on Billboard magazine's Top 100 singles of 1962.

== Background ==
This song is considered a sequel to Darren's previous hit song "Goodbye Cruel World" (1961). It's about a sad man, who had lost his love, becoming the king of fools, to her royal majesty. The Music is in the style of a British music Hall number, with a brass and wind section, plus a snare drum rhythm, playing royal coronation music. The song begins with a drum roll, with Darren announcing: "Ladies and Gentlemen: Presenting her Royal Majesty".

== Chart performance ==
Chart (1962)	Peak position
Canada (CHUM)	8
UK Singles (The Official Charts Company)	36
US Billboard Hot 100	6
