= Tuesday Knight (album) =

Studio album by Tuesday Knight
- Released: 1987
- Recorded: Smoketree Ranch Studios (Los Angeles, California); Parc Studios (Orlando, Florida)
- Genres: AOR, pop rock, teen pop, freestyle
- Length: 40:27
- Label: Parc/CBS Records
- Producers: Frank Wildhorn; Karl Richardson; Charles Rice; Michael Egizi

Tuesday Knight chronology
Tuesday Knight (1987)	Here It Comes (2000)

Singles from Tuesday Knight
- 1. "Out of Control" Released: August 20, 1987

Tuesday Knight is the third album by American recording artist and actress Tuesday Knight. The album was released by Parc/CBS Records in August 1987 on Vinyl and cassette, and was accompanied by the lead single "Out of Control".

== Background ==
After providing background vocals on Quiet Riot's 1983 album, Metal Health, Knight was signed by Vanity Records in 1984. She was later bought out of her contract and signed to CBS Records, after which, she began recording her debut album.

Almost all tracks were written and produced by Frank Wildhorn, who would go on to become known for the Broadway musical Jekyll & Hyde, of which Knight appeared on the original demo for. The album was also produced by Karl Richardson (The Bee Gees, Diana Ross, Barbra Streisand) and JD Nicholas (of the Commodores), who performed alongside Knight on the track "Celebrate Love". Knight also co-wrote two of the tracks, "Temporary Obsession" and "You're Gonna Need Somebody". Also included is a cover of Prince's "Why You Wanna Treat Me So Bad?".

The opening track, "Out of Control", was released as the album's sole single on August 20, 1987, with an accompanying music video filmed. The song received decent exposure in dance clubs, and was remixed several times with different single releases. In order to promote the album, Knight made a series of mall appearances and also performed at such venues as Madame Wong's West and The Palace.

== Track listing ==
No.	Title	Writer(s)	Length
1.	"Out of Control"	F. Wildhorn, B. Marlette	4:45
2.	"Temporary Obsession"	F. Wildhorn, T. Knight	4:04
3.	"The Harder You Love"	F. Wildhorn	4:28
4.	"You're Gonna Need Somebody"	F. Wildhorn, T. Knight	3:56
5.	"Celebrate Love (feat. JD Nicholas)"	F. Wildhorn	4:03
6.	"After the Night is Gone"	F. Wildhorn	3:53
7.	"Little by Little"	F. Wildhorn	4:43
8.	"Why You Wanna Treat Me So Bad?"	Prince	4:08
9.	"Never Too Late"	F. Wildhorn, S. Shifrin	4:28
10.	"Knowing You're There"	F. Wildhorn	1:53

== Personnel ==
- Chuck Barth: Programming
- Amanda Bearde: Background vocals
- Marissa Benedict: Horn
- Michael Benedict: Horn
- Lynn Davis: Arranger, background vocals
- Michael Egizi: Producer, songwriter
- Danny Jacob: Guitar
- Holly Knight: Songwriter
- Tuesday Knight: Main performer, background vocals, songwriter
- Bob Marlette: Songwriter, guitar, drums, keyboards, synthesizer
- James Dean "J.D." Nicholas: Vocals, background vocals
- Prince: Songwriter
- Sue Shifrin: Songwriter
- Charles Rice: Producer
- Karl Richardson: Producer, engineer
- Duane Roland: Guitar
- Joe Torano: Background vocals
- Frank Wildhorn: Producer, songwriter, piano
