= James Darren =

American actor (1936–2024)

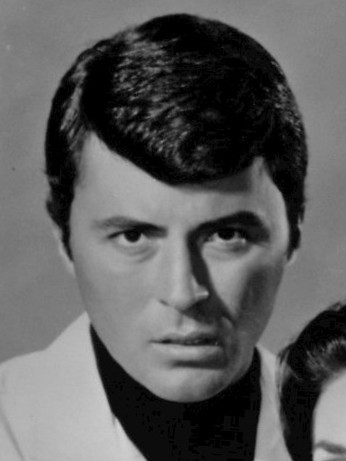
- Darren in The Time Tunnel (1966)
- Born: James William Ercolani; June 8, 1936; Philadelphia, Pennsylvania, U.S.
- Died: September 2, 2024 (aged 88); Los Angeles, California, U.S.
- Years active: 1956–2017
- Known for: Actor, singer, director
- Notable work: Moondoggie in Gidget; Tony Newman in The Time Tunnel; James Corrigan in T. J. Hooker; Vic Fontaine in Star Trek: Deep Space Nine
- Spouses: Gloria Terlitsky (m. 1955; div. 1958); Evy Norlund (m. 1960)
- Children: 3, including Jim Moret
- Musical career
- Genres: Pop; easy listening; jazz; swing
- Instrument: Vocals
- Labels: Colpix; Warner; Kirshner; Concord Jazz
- Website: www.jamesdarren.com

James William Ercolani (June 8, 1936 – September 2, 2024), known by his stage name James Darren, was an American actor, singer, and television director. During the late 1950s and early 1960s, he had notable starring and supporting roles in films including the youth and beach-culture film Gidget (1959) and its sequels. He also appeared in The Gene Krupa Story (1959), All the Young Men (1960), The Guns of Navarone (1961), and Diamond Head (1962).

As a teen pop singer, he sang hit singles including "Goodbye Cruel World" in 1961. He later became more active in television, starring as Dr. Anthony Newman on the science fiction series The Time Tunnel (1966–67). He had the regular role of Officer James Corrigan on the police drama T. J. Hooker (1982–86) and had a recurring role as Vic Fontaine on Star Trek: Deep Space Nine (1998–99).

== Early life ==
James William Ercolani was born in Philadelphia, on June 8, 1936. He was of Italian descent and grew up in South Philadelphia near where Fabian and Frankie Avalon lived. In an interview with the News Press of Fort Myers, Florida he said that the area where he lived was "a real neighborhood. It made you feel that you could be successful, too." He mentioned that Al Martino and Eddie Fisher were from the neighborhood.

Darren wanted to be an actor and studied in New York City with Stella Adler for a number of years. He also occasionally sang although he later said "I wasn't really a singer. I was a kid in Philly whose dad would take him to bars and nightclubs and I would get up and sing two songs."

== Career ==
Darren was discovered by talent agent and casting director Joyce Selznick after he got some photographs taken by Maurice Seymour to show potential agents:

His secretary, a woman by the name of Yvonne Bouvier, asked me if I was interested in getting into film. I said yeah, I was. She said I know someone you should meet. She set up a meeting between me and Joyce Selznick, who worked for Screen Gems. I went down to 1650 Broadway, the Brill Building. On my way to a meeting with Joyce, we just happened to get on the elevator at the same time. She kept staring at me. I never met her. She never met me. We got off at the same floor and walked to the same office. That was our meeting. Joyce brought me over to Columbia Pictures about a week later and got me a contract there.

=== Columbia ===
Columbia signed Darren to a long-term contract in July 1956. A few weeks later he was filming his first film, Rumble on the Docks (1956), a low-budget "B" movie produced by Sam Katzman, where Darren played the lead. Darren's appearance was well received and he got a lot of fan mail–second at the studio only to Kim Novak. He guest starred on an episode of TV's The Web ("Kill and Run") and then Columbia gave him a support role in an "A" picture, the comedy Operation Mad Ball (1957), starring Jack Lemmon and Ernie Kovacs.

He had support roles in two films directed by Phil Karlson: The Brothers Rico (1957), a film noir, playing the brother of Richard Conte; and Gunman's Walk (1958), a Western with Van Heflin and Tab Hunter. In between he was second billed in another movie for Katzman, The Tijuana Story (1957), although his role was relatively small.

=== Gidget and singing ===
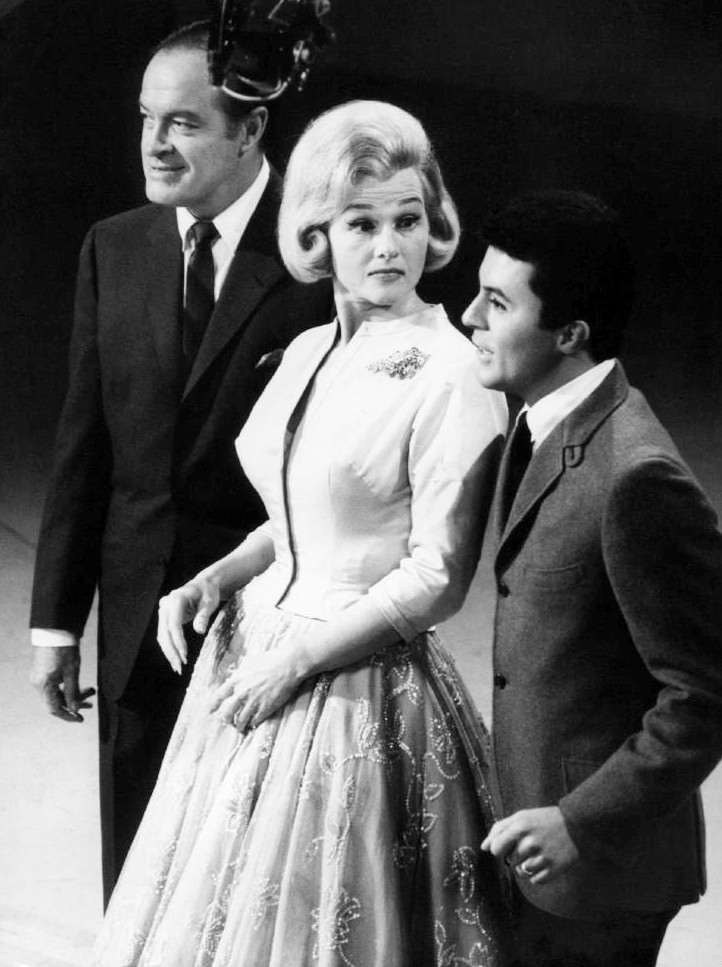
With Bob Hope and Jo Stafford, 1961

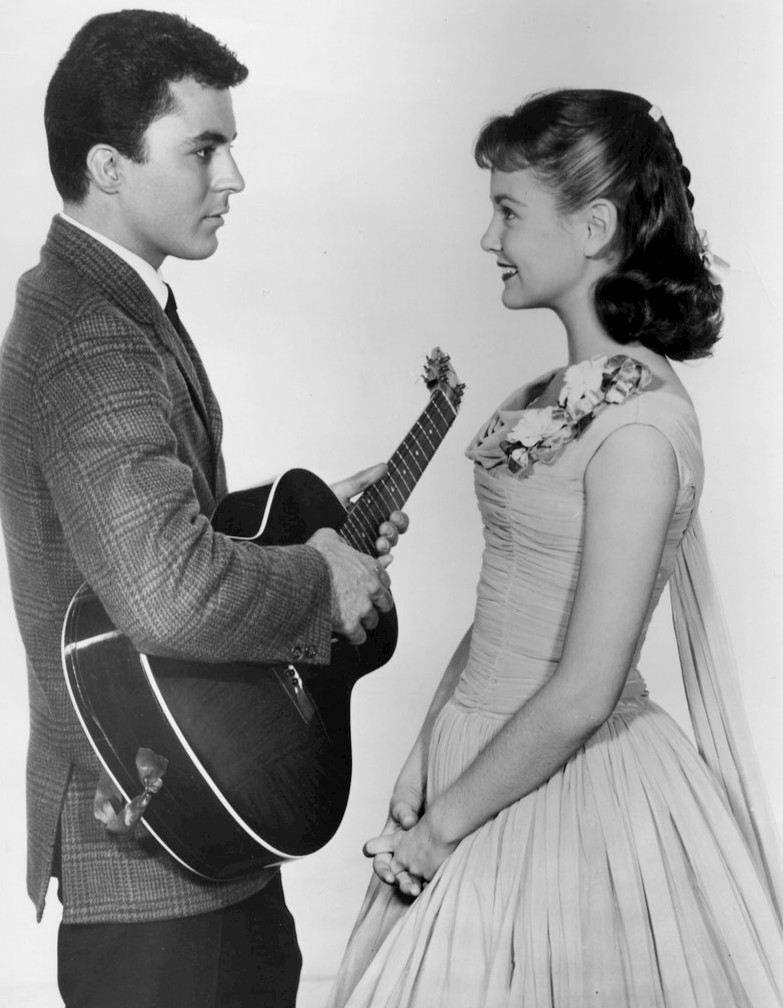
With Shelley Fabares in The Donna Reed Show, 1959

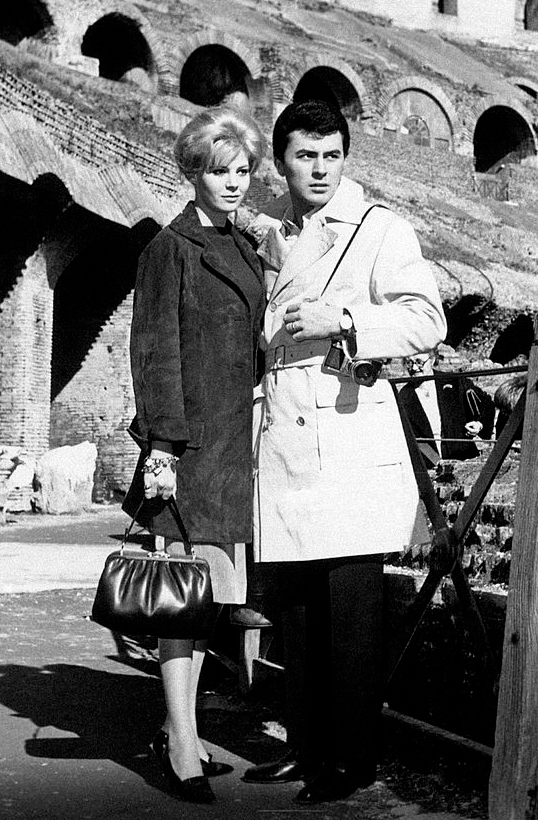
Evy Norlund and James Darren on their honeymoon in Rome in 1960

Darren was third billed in the surf film, Gidget (1959), starring Sandra Dee and Cliff Robertson, playing Moondoggie, essentially the film's leading man. He also sang the title track. "They were thinking about having someone do the vocal and I would lip sync", he recalled. "I told them I could do it. So we went into one of the sound stages and I sang 'Gidget'. They said, 'He sings fine,' then I did all the other songs."

The film was a hit with teen audiences and so was the song. Darren wound up recording a string of pop hits for Colpix Records, the biggest of which was "Goodbye Cruel World" (No. 3 on the Billboard Hot 100 in 1961). It sold over one million copies, and was awarded a gold disc. He also recorded this song in Italian, as "Addio Mondo Crudele", which was very successful in Europe. His follow-ups also became hits: "Her Royal Majesty" (No. 6 on the Billboard Hot 100 in 1962) and "Conscience" (No. 11, 1962). He is also featured in one of the Scopitone series of pop-music video jukebox films ("Because You're Mine").

Twice, in 1959 and 1961, Darren played teen idols on episodes of The Donna Reed Show. He did an episode of The Lineup (1959). He was third billed in a series of films for Columbia: The Gene Krupa Story (1959), a biopic with Sal Mineo; All the Young Men (1960), a Korean War movie with Alan Ladd and Sidney Poitier; and Let No Man Write My Epitaph (1960) with Burl Ives and Shelley Winters, which was a sequel to Knock on Any Door (1949). He had a cameo as himself in a teen film, Because They're Young (1960), singing the title track.

Darren had a supporting role in the World War II film The Guns of Navarone (1961), a huge hit at the box office. However, he later said "The people handling my career at that point didn't really take advantage of it." Also popular was Gidget Goes Hawaiian (1961) where Darren reprised his role as Moondoggie; he had a new Gidget (Deborah Walley) and was given top billing.

Darren had a good support role in a melodrama, Diamond Head (1962) with Charlton Heston. He played Moondoggie a third time in Gidget Goes to Rome (1962) which he later said he "hated... I didn't want to do it. I thought that I'd be doing those for the rest of my life." He told Entertainment Weekly in 2024, "They (Columbia Pictures) had me under contract; I was a prisoner. But with those young ladies (Sandra Dee, Deborah Walley, and Cindy Carol), it was the best prison I think I'll ever be in."

He sang the title track for Under the Yum Yum Tree (1963). He also did voice-over work for Screen Gems' Hanna-Barbera animation unit. He was caricatured as teen idol "Jimmy Darrock" on an episode of The Flintstones, and was the singing voice of Yogi Bear in the theatrical feature, Hey There, It's Yogi Bear! (released 1964), on the song "Ven-e, Ven-o, Ven-a". Darren's seven-year contract with Columbia expired in 1963, and he did not renew it. His recording agreement with Colpix remained in force, and Colpix issued new records into 1965. In the same year he changed labels, signing with Warner Bros. Records where he had a Top-40 hit ("All", No. 35, 1967).

=== Universal ===
In 1963 Darren signed a seven-picture deal with Universal, starting with The Lively Set (1963). That teamed him with Pamela Tiffin, who was also in For Those Who Think Young (1964), a teen film Darren made for United Artists. Nancy Sinatra appeared in the movie as well. Darren was the godfather of Nancy's daughter, AJ Lambert.

=== Irwin Allen ===
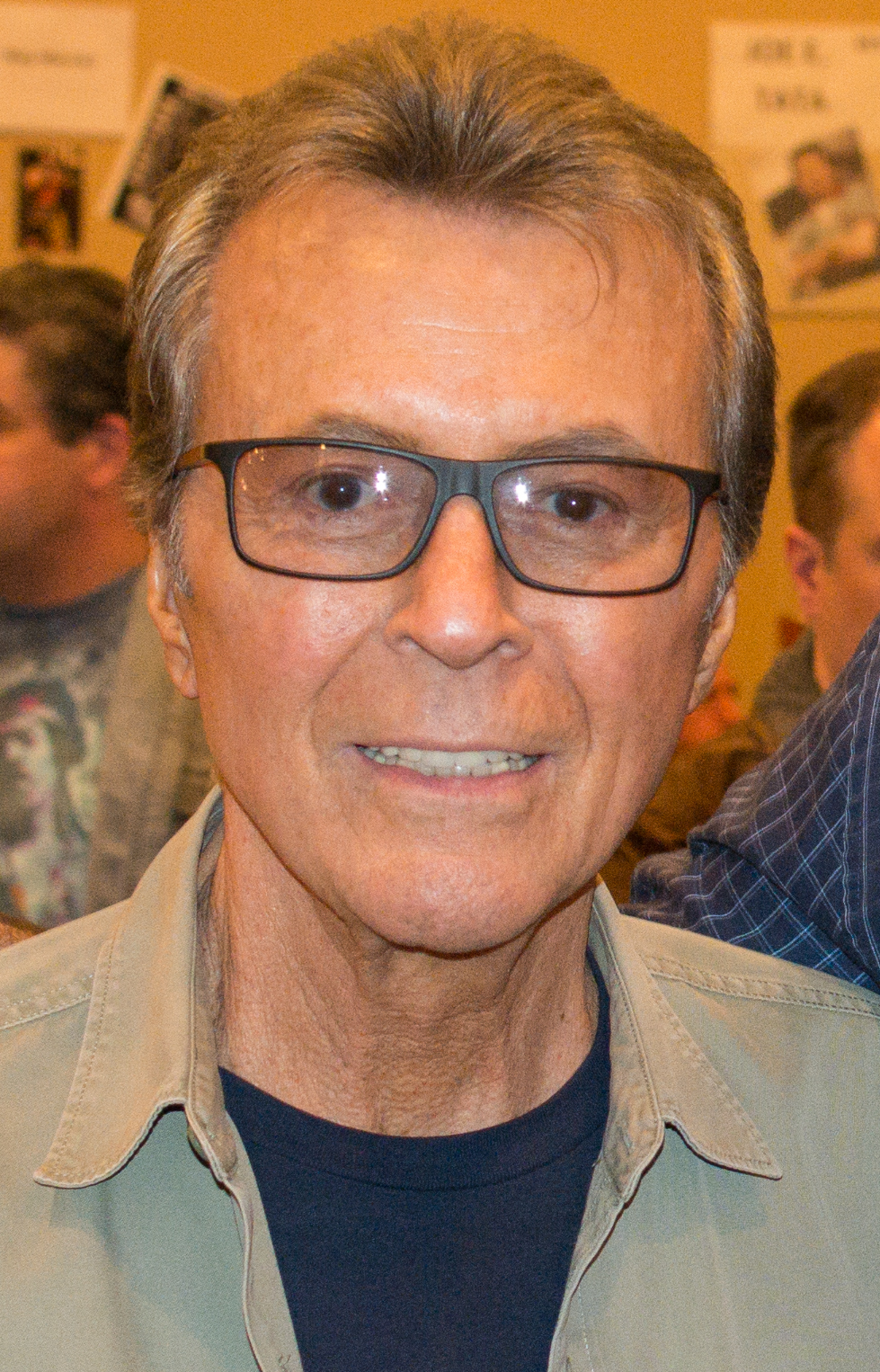
Darren in 2015

Darren guest-starred on an episode of Irwin Allen's Voyage to the Bottom of the Sea. Allen then cast Darren in the lead of a series, as impulsive scientist and adventurer Tony Newman on the science fiction series The Time Tunnel (1966–1967) with Robert Colbert and Lee Meriwether. When the series ended, Allen shot a pilot for a new series starring Darren, The Man from the 25th Century, but it was not picked up.

Darren went to Europe to make Venus in Furs (1969) for Jess Franco and was reunited with Allen in City Beneath the Sea (1971).

=== TV guest star ===
In the 1970s, Darren performed regularly in night clubs. He focused on guest starring on TV series, such as Love, American Style; S.W.A.T.; Police Woman; Baa Baa Black Sheep; The Feather & Father Gang; Charlie's Angels; Police Story; Hawaii Five-O; Vegas; The Love Boat; and Fantasy Island.

He had a role in the TV movie The Lives of Jenny Dolan (1975) and the film The Boss' Son (1978). In the early 1980s Darren appeared on Scruples (1981) and One Day at a Time.

=== Portrait of a Legend ===
In the late 1970s and early 1980s, Darren was the host of Portrait of a Legend, a weekly show in which he conducted an interview with a popular musician about their career interspersed with classic performance footage of that artist. Artists who appeared included Jerry Lee Lewis, Little Richard, Sly Stone, and Herb Alpert. The show appeared mostly on PBS.

=== T. J. Hooker and directing ===
From 1983 to 1986 Darren had a regular role as Officer James Corrigan on the television police drama T. J. Hooker. "Every career has its hills and valleys", Darren said in 1983. "The most important thing is that you are happy with you. Not anybody's career, no one that I know of, has always been climbing. It always levels out and you want to make sure you have good investments and financial security and bread on the table. If projects aren't coming to you, then you seek them out and you try to develop and put projects together."

He directed some episodes and launched a career as a director, notably of action-based series, including Hunter, The A-Team, Silk Stalkings, Renegade, and Nowhere Man as well as dramas such as Beverly Hills, 90210 and Melrose Place. He continued to act on such shows as Raven.

=== Deep Space Nine ===
In 1998, Darren achieved popularity anew as a singer through his appearances on Star Trek: Deep Space Nine in the role of holographic crooner and adviser Vic Fontaine. His role in Deep Space Nine inspired his return to singing. Many of his vocal performances on the show were re-recorded for the album This One's from the Heart (1999). The album shows Darren, a close friend of Frank Sinatra, singing in the Sinatra style. The 2001 follow-up Because of You showed similar inspiration from Tony Bennett.

Darren's later appearances include Random Acts (2001) and Lucky (2017).

== Personal life ==
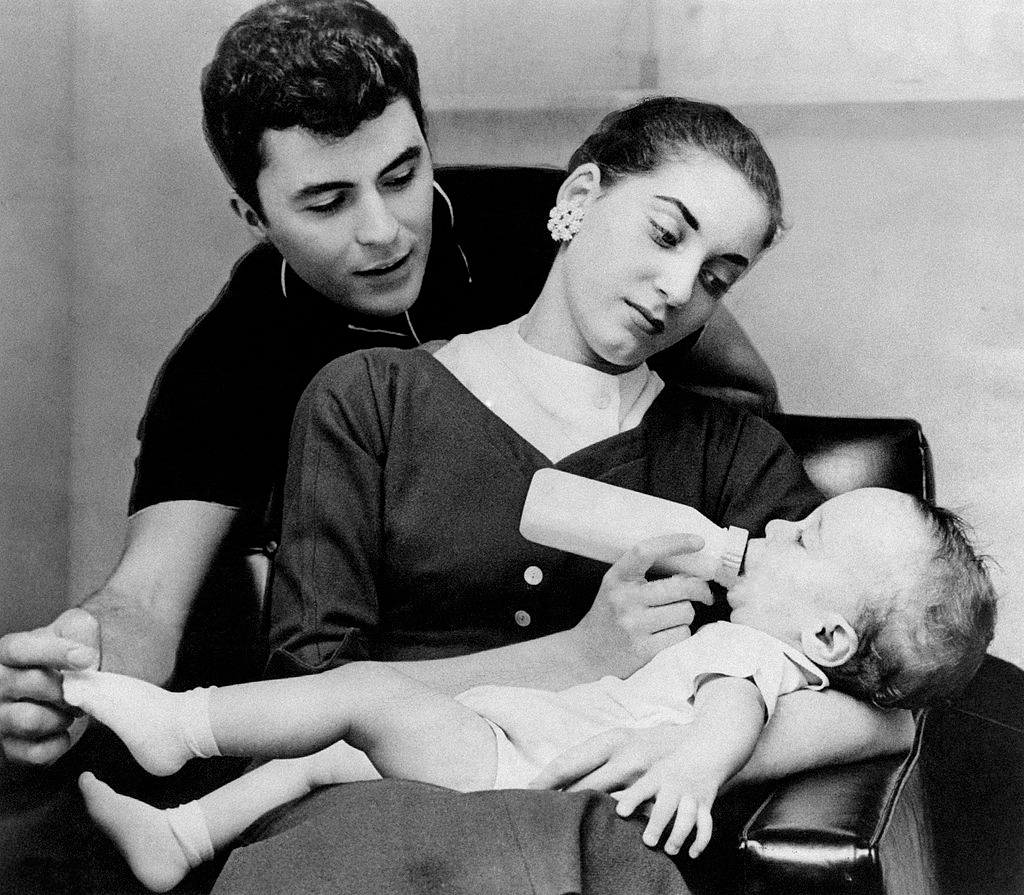
James Darren with Gloria Terlitsky and son James Jr.

In 1955, Darren married Gloria Terlitsky, his sweetheart since 1953. Her father opposed their marriage because Terlitsky was Jewish while Darren was Roman Catholic. Darren and Terlitsky had a son, James Jr. ("Jimmy"), and divorced in 1958. Jimmy was adopted by Gloria's third husband and is now known as Jim Moret, a journalist and television commentator.

Two years after the divorce, Darren married Evy Norlund, Miss Denmark 1958. They had two sons.

=== Death ===
Darren died from congestive heart failure in his sleep, at Cedars-Sinai Medical Center in Los Angeles, on September 2, 2024. He was 88. In the weeks before his death, Darren was experiencing issues relating to the function of his aortic valve. His doctors judged his condition too fragile to undergo surgery and repair it.

== Filmography ==
=== Film ===
Film
Year	Title	Role	Notes
1956	Rumble on the Docks	Jimmy Smigelski	
1957	Operation Mad Ball	Pvt. Widowskas	
1957	The Brothers Rico	Johnny Rico	
1957	The Tijuana Story	Mitch	
1958	Gunman's Walk	Davy Hackett	
1959	Gidget	Jeffrey "Moondoggie" Matthews	
1959	The Gene Krupa Story	Eddie Sirota	
1960	Because They're Young	Himself	
1960	All the Young Men	Pvt. Cotton	
1960	Let No Man Write My Epitaph	Nick Romano	
1961	The Guns of Navarone	Pvt. Spyro Pappadimos	
1961	Gidget Goes Hawaiian	Jeffrey "Moondoggie" Matthews	
1962	Diamond Head	Paul Kahana	
1963	Gidget Goes to Rome	Jeffrey "Moondoggie" Matthews	
1963	Under the Yum Yum Tree	Himself	
1964	Hey There, It's Yogi Bear!	Yogi Bear (singing voice)	
1964	For Those Who Think Young	Gardner 'Ding' Pruitt III	
1964	The Lively Set	Casey Owens	
1968	The Man from the 25th Century	Tomo / Robert Prentiss	
1969	Venus in Furs	Jimmy Logan	
1978	The Boss' Son	Buddy Weistein	
1979	That's Life		Unfinished
2001	Random Acts	Allen	
2017	Lucky	Paulie	

=== Television ===
Television
Year	Title	Role	Notes
1957	The Web	Tony Roberts	Episode: "Kill and Run"
1959	Kovacs on Music	Various	TV movie
1959	The Lineup	Vezey	Episode: "Vengeful Knife"
1959–61	The Donna Reed Show	Kip Dennis / Jim Bryce / Buzz Berry	2 episodes
1965	The Flintstones	Jimmy Darrock (singing voice)	S5.E26 - “Surfin' Fred” aired Mar 12, 1965
1966	Voyage to the Bottom of the Sea	Omir	Episode: "The Mechanical Man"
1966–67	The Time Tunnel	Dr. Tony Newman	30 episodes
1971	City Beneath the Sea	Dr. Talty	TV movie
1971	Love, American Style	Roger Barnes (segment "Love and the Monsters")	Episode: "Love and the Anniversary Crisis/Love and the Conjugal Visit/Love and the Dream Burglar/Love and the Hotel Caper/Love and the Monsters"
1974	Match Game	Himself	5 episodes
1975	The Lives of Jenny Dolan	Orlando	TV movie
1976	S.W.A.T.	Joey Wade	Episodes: "The Running Man: Part 1" and "The Running Man: Part 2"
1976	Police Woman	Rick Matteo	Episodes: "The Task Force" (2 Parts)
1977	Baa Baa Black Sheep	Lt. Col. Rod Towers	Episode: "The War Biz Warrior"
1977	The Feather and Father Gang	Praeger	Episode: "For the Love of Sheila"
1977	Charlie's Angels	David Barzak	Episode: "Circus of Terror"
1977	Police Story	Roger Lewis	Episode: "Stigma"
1978–79	Hawaii Five-O	Johnny Munroe	Episode: "Number One with a Bullet Part 1 and 2"
1980	Vega$	Paul Bracken	Episode: "Consortium"
1980	Turnover Smith	Georgie Green	TV movie
1981	The Love Boat	Tony Steeter	Episode: "Lose One, Win One/The $10,000 Lover/Mind My Wife"
1981	Scruples	Vito	TV movie
1979–82	Fantasy Island	Claude Duvalle, Brian Holmes, Michael Duvall	3 episodes
1983	One Day at a Time	Roger Alexander	Episode: "The Cruise"
1982–85	T. J. Hooker	Officer Jim Corrigan	66 episodes
1992	Raven	Billy Sharp	Episode: "Is Someone Crazy in Here or Is It Me"
1992	Renegade	Lou Delgado	Episode: "Second Chance"
1994	Silk Stalkings		Episode: "Natural Selection: Part 1"
1997	Diagnosis: Murder	Councilman Matthew Watson	Episode: "Murder Blues"
1999	Melrose Place	Tony Marlin	5 episodes
1998–99	Star Trek: Deep Space Nine	Vic Fontaine	8 episodes

== Partial discography ==
=== Singles ===
Year	Titles (A-side, B-side) Both sides from same album except where indicated	Peak chart positions				Album
Year	Titles (A-side, B-side) Both sides from same album except where indicated	US Billboard	US AC	Canada CHUM/RPM	UK	Album
1958	"Mighty Pretty Territory" b/w "There's No Such Thing"	—	—	—	—	Album No. 1
1959	"Gidget" b/w "You" (from James Darren Sings for All Sizes)	41	—	33	—	Album No. 1
1959	"Angel Face" b/w "I Don't Wanna Lose Ya"	47	—	30	—	James Darren Sings for All Sizes
1959	"I Ain't Sharin Sharon" b/w "Love Among the Young" (from Album No. 1)	—	—	—	—	non-album track
1959	"Teenage Tears" b/w "Let There Be Love" (Non-album track)	—	—	—	—	James Darren Sings for All Sizes
1960	"You Are My Dream" b/w "Your Smile"	—	—	—	—	Gidget Goes Hawaiian – James Darren Sings the Movies
1960	"Because They're Young" b/w "Tears in My Eyes" (from James Darren Sings for All Sizes)	—	—	—	29	Gidget Goes Hawaiian – James Darren Sings the Movies
1960	"Traveling Down a Lonely Road" b/w "P.S. I Love You"	—	—	—	—	Gidget Goes Hawaiian – James Darren Sings the Movies
1960	"All the Young Men" b/w "How Sweet You Are" (from James Darren Sings for All Sizes)	—	—	—	—	non-album track
1960	"Come On My Love" b/w "Man About Town" (from James Darren Sings for All Sizes)	—	—	—	—	Gidget Goes Hawaiian – James Darren Sings the Movies
1961	"Goodbye My Lady Love" b/w "Walkin' My Baby Back Home" (Non-album track)	—	—	—	—	Gidget Goes Hawaiian – James Darren Sings the Movies
1961	"Gotta Have Love" b/w "Fool's Paradise" (Non-album track)	—	—	—	—	James Darren Sings for All Sizes
1961	"Gidget Goes Hawaiian" b/w "Wild About That Girl"	—	—	—	—	Gidget Goes Hawaiian – James Darren Sings the Movies
1961	"You Are My Dream" b/w "Hand In Hand"	—	—	—	—	Gidget Goes Hawaiian – James Darren Sings the Movies
1961	"Goodbye Cruel World" b/w "Valerie"	3	—	1	28	James Darren Sings For All Sizes
1962	"Her Royal Majesty" b/w "If I Could Only Tell You" (from James Darren Sings for All Sizes)	6	—	8	36	Teenage Triangle
1962	"Conscience" b/w "Dream Big" (from James Darren Sings for All Sizes)	11	—	10	30	Teenage Triangle
1962	"Mary's Little Lamb" b/w "The Life of the Party"	39	—	23	—	Non-album tracks
1962	"Hail to the Conquering Hero" b/w "Too Young to Go Steady" (from Love Among the Young)	97	—	—	—	Non-album tracks
1962	"Hear What I Wanna Hear" b/w "I'll Be Loving You"	—	—	—	—	Non-album tracks
1963	"Pin a Medal On Joey" b/w "Diamond Head"	54	—	29	—	Non-album tracks
1963	"They Should Have Given You the Oscar" b/w "Blame It On My Youth" (from Love Among the Young)	—	—	—	—	Non-album tracks
1963	"Gegetta" b/w "Grande Luna Italiana"	—	—	—	—	More Teenage Triangle
1963	"Back Stage" b/w "Under the Yum Yum Tree"	—	—	—	—	Non-album tracks
1964	"Punch and Judy" b/w "Just Think of Tonight"	—	—	—	—	Non-album tracks
1965	"Baby, Talk to Me" b/w "A Married Man" (Non-album track)	—	—	—	—	More Teenage Triangle
1965	"Because You're Mine" b/w "Millions of Roses"	—	30	—	—	Non-album tracks
1966	"Tom Hawk" b/w "I Want to Be Lonely"	—	—	—	—	Non-album tracks
1966	"Where Did We Go Wrong" b/w "Counting the Cracks"	—	—	—	—	Non-album tracks
1966	"Crazy Me" b/w "They Don't Know"	—	—	—	—	Non-album tracks
1966	"Tomorrow Tomorrow" b/w "Love Is Where You Find It"	—	—	—	—	Non-album tracks
1967	"All" b/w "Misty Morning Eyes" (Non-album track)	35	5	37	—	All
1967	"Since I Don't Have You" b/w "I Miss You So"	123	—	—	—	All
1967	"Didn't We" b/w "Counting the Cracks"	—	36	—	—	non-album tracks
1967	"They Don't Know" b/w "The House Song"	—	—	—	—	non-album tracks
1968	"Cherie" b/w "Wait Until Dark"	—	—	—	—	non-album tracks
1968	"Each and Every Part of Me" b/w "A Little Bit of Heaven"	—	—	—	—	non-album tracks
1970	"Wheeling, West Virginia" b/w "That's My World"	—	—	—	—	non-album tracks
1971	"Bring Me Down Slow" b/w "More and More"	—	—	—	—	Mammy Blue
1971	"Mammy Blue" b/w "As Long As You Love Me"	107	—	—	—	Mammy Blue
1972	"Ain't Been Home In a Long Time" b/w "I Think Somebody Loves Me"	—	—	—	—	
1972	"Brian's Song" b/w "Thank Heaven for Little Girls"	—	—	—	—	Love Songs from the Movies
1973	"Let the Heartaches Begin" b/w "Sad Song"	—	—	—	—	non-album tracks
1973	"Stay" b/w "Sad Eyed Romany Woman"	—	—	—	—	non-album tracks
1975	"Love On the Screen" b/w "Losing You"	—	—	—	—	non-album tracks
1976	"Sleepin' in a Bed of Lies" b/w "One Has My Name, the Other Has My Heart"	—	—	—	—	non-album tracks
1977	"You Take My Heart Away" b/w Disco version of A-side	52	—	—	—	non-album tracks
1978	"Only a Dream Away" b/w "Losing You"	—	—	—	—	non-album tracks
1978	"Let Me Take You in My Arms Again" b/w "California"	—	—	—	—	non-album tracks
1978	"The Next Time" b/w "Something Like Nothing Before"	—	—	—	—	non-album tracks

=== Albums ===
- 1960 Album No. 1 (reissued 2004)
- 1961 Sings the Movies (Gidget Goes Hawaiian) (No. 132 US)
- 1962 Love Among the Young (reissued 2004)
- 1962 Sings for All Sizes
- 1963 Bye Bye Birdie (with The Marcels, Paul Petersen and Shelley Fabares)
- 1963 Teenage Triangle (with Paul Petersen and Shelley Fabares) (No. 48 US)
- 1964 More Teenage Triangle (with Paul Petersen and Shelley Fabares)
- 1967 All (reissued 2005) (No. 187 US)
- 1971 Mammy Blue
- 1972 Love Songs from the Movies
- 1994 The Best of James Darren
- 1999 This One's from the Heart
- 2001 Because of You
- 2019 Live! For The First Time

Many compilation albums also exist.
