= Tuesday Knight =

American actress, singer and designer (born 1969)

- Born: February 17, 1961 (age 65); Los Angeles, California, U.S.
- Occupations: Actress; singer; jewelry designer
- Years active: 1983–present
- Musical career
- Genres: AOR; pop rock; teen pop; freestyle; adult contemporary
- Labels: Parc; Knight and Day

Tuesday Lynn Knight (born February 17, 1961) is an American actress, singer and designer. She is best known for her role as Kristen Parker in the 1988 film A Nightmare on Elm Street 4: The Dream Master, replacing Patricia Arquette in the sequel to A Nightmare on Elm Street 3: Dream Warriors (1987). Her other film roles include Mistress (1992), The Fan (1996), Daddy and Them (2001), and How to Be Single (2016). Knight has had guest appearances on several television series, such as Profiler (1996) and The X-Files (1999), as well as a starring role on 2000 Malibu Road (1992). Outside of acting, her self-titled debut album was released in 1987 and her jewelry line was launched in 2001.

== Career ==
=== Never Sleep Again: The Elm Street Legacy ===
Knight, along with most of the Elm Street franchise alumni, is featured in a documentary, Never Sleep Again: The Elm Street Legacy, about New Line Cinema's hit movie series. The documentary is directed by Daniel Farrands and Andrew Kasch, produced by Thommy Hutson, and was hosted by Elm Street veteran Heather Langenkamp. The documentary wove the tale of how one of the most successful horror genre franchises came to be. It came out in May 2010.

=== Music ===
Knight has been on the music scene since 1985 with her debut album Little Things. She later signed a recording deal with Vanity Records. She released her album Don’t Talk Back in 1986. In 1986, she appeared on the original demo for the production that would become Jekyll & Hyde for Frank Wildhorn.

After working on the Quiet Riot album Metal Health as backing vocals, Knight was bought out of her contract by CBS/PARC Records where she then recorded what would be a self-titled album Tuesday Knight in 1987 on Parc/CBS Records. It contained a cover version of Prince's "Why You Wanna Treat Me So Bad?" The album's sole single was called "Out of Control." Her fourth album Here it Comes, released in 2000, had more of a commercial success than her previous attempt.

In 1990 she sang the song "Ivory Tower" on the Mad About You soundtrack. In 1996, she sang a cover of The Police's song "Every Breath You Take" in an episode of Profiler entitled "I'll Be Watching You". In 2001, Tuesday provided her voice for the song "If It Takes All Night" in the film The Theory of the Leisure Class. She later watched a performance by the David Bowie Tribute Band Space Oddity and joined them as Keyboardist and Backing vocals. On September 17, 2012, Knight released Faith, an 18-track album featuring a collection of songs recorded over the past 25 years. In September 2017, Knight returned with a new album called Uncovered.

Her song "Nightmare" is heard in the opening credits of 1988's A Nightmare on Elm Street 4: The Dream Master. The song was never released on the official soundtrack, but has since been released by Knight on CD and MP3 formats.

== Filmography ==
=== Film ===
Year	Film	Role	Notes
1988	Promised a Miracle	Roberta Palmer	Television film
1988	A Nightmare on Elm Street 4: The Dream Master	Kristen Parker	
1989	The Preppie Murder	Shawn Kovell	Television film
1990	Teach 109	Technician	Television short
1992	Who Killed Baby Jesus?	Eve Cody	
1992	The Prom	Porn Girl in Waiting Room	
1992	Mistress	Peggy	
1993	Calendar Girl	Nude Woman / Marilyn Monroe	
1993	Cover Story	Tracy / Reen	
1994	Wes Craven's New Nightmare	Herself	
1994	Cool and the Crazy	Brenda	Television film
1995	The Babysitter	Waitress	
1995	Star Witness	Anna	Television film
1995	Strike Back	Anna	
1996	The Fan	Nurse	
1996	The Hindsight	Karen	
1996	The Cottonwood	Ruby	
1997	Telling Lies in America	WHK Receptionist	
2000	Brother	Prostitute	
2001	The Theory of the Leisure Class	Callie	
2001	Daddy and Them	Billy Montgomery	
2004	Sweet Underground	Frances	
2005	Diamond Zero a.k.a. IceMaker	Lil	
2010	Never Sleep Again: The Elm Street Legacy	Herself	Documentary
2014	Opening Night	Victoria Lawson	
2016	How to Be Single	Actress	Uncredited
2020	The Bloody Man	Kim Harris	
2021	Sitting Duck	Camille Henderson	
2021	The Amityville Moon	Sister Ruth	

=== Television ===
Year	Series	Role	Notes
1984	Fame	Suzi Detroit	Episode: "The Monster That Devoured Las Vegas"
1987	General Hospital	Val	
1988	The Facts of Life	Amy	Episode: "Let's Face the Music"
1989	Matlock	Abby Smith	Episode: "The Starlet"
1990–1992	Sunset Beat	Lucy	6 episodes
1992	2000 Malibu Road	Joy Rule	6 episodes
1995	Law & Order	Candy	Episode: "Humiliation"
1996	Profiler	Morissa	Episode: "I'll Be Watching You"
1997	The Perfect Mother	Made for T.V movie	
1997	Spicy City	Virus	Episode: "Love is a Download"
1999	The X-Files	Jackie Gurwitch	Episode: "Trevor"

== Discography ==
=== Studio albums ===
- Little Things (1985)
- Don't Talk Back (1986)
- Tuesday Knight (1987)
- Here It Comes (2000)
- Uncovered (2017)

=== Compilation albums ===
- Faith (2012)
