= Laura Elsie Dickinson =

American actor and musician

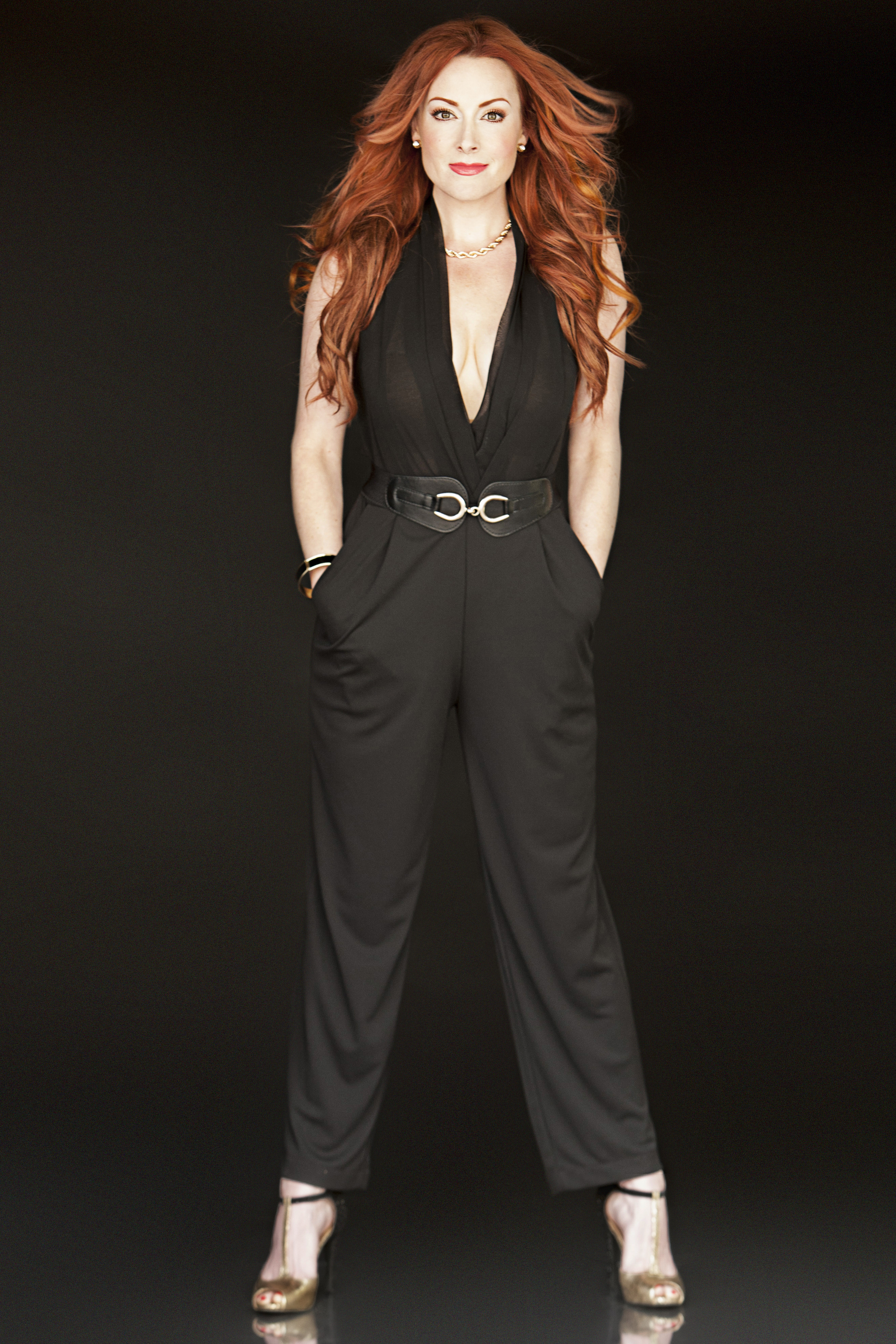
- Born: Laura Elsie Dickinson
- Occupations: Actor; musician
- Years active: 1985–present
- Website: lcpowell.me

Laura Elsie Dickinson, who currently goes by LC Powell, is an American actress and musician from California who is best known for her work on the Disney Channel's programs Phineas and Ferb, Sofia the First, and Jake and the Never Land Pirates as a voice actor, music arranger and contractor, and voice director.

== Career ==
Dickinson grew up in Los Angeles. Dickinson is a voice actor and music arranger for the original four seasons and upcoming fifth season of Phineas and Ferb.

In 2019, Dickinson performed on the Emmy-nominated track "The Way It Used to Be" from the Watchmen.
